= Vollmer M35 =

Series of German experimental automatic rifles

The Vollmer M 35 (also known as Vollmer-Maschinenkarabiner or MKb 35) consisted of a series of experimental automatic rifles developed by Heinrich Vollmer in the 1930s. The Vollmer rifles were chambered in an intermediate cartridge that was co-developed with Gustav Genschow and Co. (GECO) starting in 1934, under a Heereswaffenamt contract.

== Design ==
The M 35 was a gas-operated design, reminiscent of an earlier semi-automatic design of Vollmer—the 7.92×57mm Selbstladegewehr 29 (SG 29). Trials with Vollmer's Maschinenkarabine were conducted as early as 1935 at Biberach and later at Kummersdorf. The early version had a 20-round detachable box magazine and could fire at a rate of about 1,000 rpm. Development continued with the improved versions M 35A, M 35/II (1937) and M 35/III through 1938. The later versions had intentionally reduced rate of fire to only about 300–400rpm. It weighed about 9.5 pounds (4.3 kg) and was about 38 inches (97 cm) long. About 25 prototypes were manufactured for testing. The gun was apparently very expensive to manufacture, costing 4000 Reichsmarks, although this was the unit cost for the prototype series.

The cartridge developed also had several variants including 7.75×40.5 mm, 7.75×39.5mm, and possibly a 7.62mm version as well, and had a total length of approximately 55 mm. (The actual calibre was apparently 7.9mm, with a bullet 8.05mm in diameter.) Muzzle velocity was about 700 m/s (2,280 feet per second). The boat-tailed bullet weighted 140 grains (9 grams).

Ultimately, Nazi Germany would adopt a different intermediate cartridge and service assault rifle: the MKB 42 series leading to the Sturmgewehr 44. The later Soviet 7.62×39mm M43 cartridge bore more dimensional similarity to the GECO M 35 cartridge than it did to the German 7.92×33mm Kurz that was used in the Sturmgewehr.

== See also ==
- Fedorov Avtomat
- Ribeyrolles 1918 automatic carbine
