= List of 7.92×33mm Kurz firearms =

The below table gives a list of firearms that can fire the 7.92×33mm Kurz cartridge.

This table is sortable for every column.

Name	Type	Country	Image	Years of service	Notes
AMT pistol	Semi-automatic pistol	United States		2010	Rechambered variants, limited
Calzada Bayo CB-57	Assault rifle	Spain		1957	CB-51 variant
EM-2 rifle	Assault rifle	United Kingdom		1951	Jesieranski EM-2 and Metcalf EM-3 prototypes
FG 42	Automatic rifle	Germany		1944-1945	Tested on first model FG 42
FN Universal Carbine	Assault rifle	Belgium		1947	FN FAL prototype
Gewehr 43	Semi-automatic rifle	Germany		1943-1945	Rechambered variants
Grossfuss Sturmgewehr	Assault rifle	Germany		1945	
Gustloff Volkssturmgewehr	Semi-automatic rifle	Germany		1944-1945	
HIW VSK	Semi-automatic rifle	Germany		1944-1945	Carbine variant
Karabiner 98k	Bolt-action rifle	Germany		1945-	Post 1945 by collectors with "NUR FÜR KURZ PATRONE" stamped on barrels
Koucky KP 5	Light machine gun	Czechoslovakia		1947	
Maschinenkarabiner 42(H)	Assault rifle	Germany		1942-1945	
Maschinenkarabiner 42(W)	Assault rifle	Germany		1942-1945	
Mauser 98	Bolt-action rifle	Germany		1945-	Post 1945 Lothar-Walther barrels
PB AK pattern rifles	Semi-automatic rifle Assault rifle	Pakistan		19??-	Chambered in "Prohibited Bore" for civilians
Remington XP-100	Bullpup bolt-action pistol	United States		1961	Rechambered variants, limited
Schwaben Arms K98	Bolt-action rifle	Germany		1945-	Newly made K98 by Schwaben Arms GmbH
Spz	Assault rifle	Germany		1944-1945	
StG 44	Assault rifle	Germany		1944-1945	
StG 45(M)	Assault rifle	Germany		1945	
Volksgewehr (VG3, VG4, VG5)	Bolt-action rifle	Germany		1945	Later VG3, VG4, VG5 variants
ZK 423	Light machine gun	Bohemia and Moravia		1943	

== See also ==
- List of assault rifles
- List of 7.62×39mm firearms
