= Grossfuss Sturmgewehr =

Großfuß Sturmgewehr
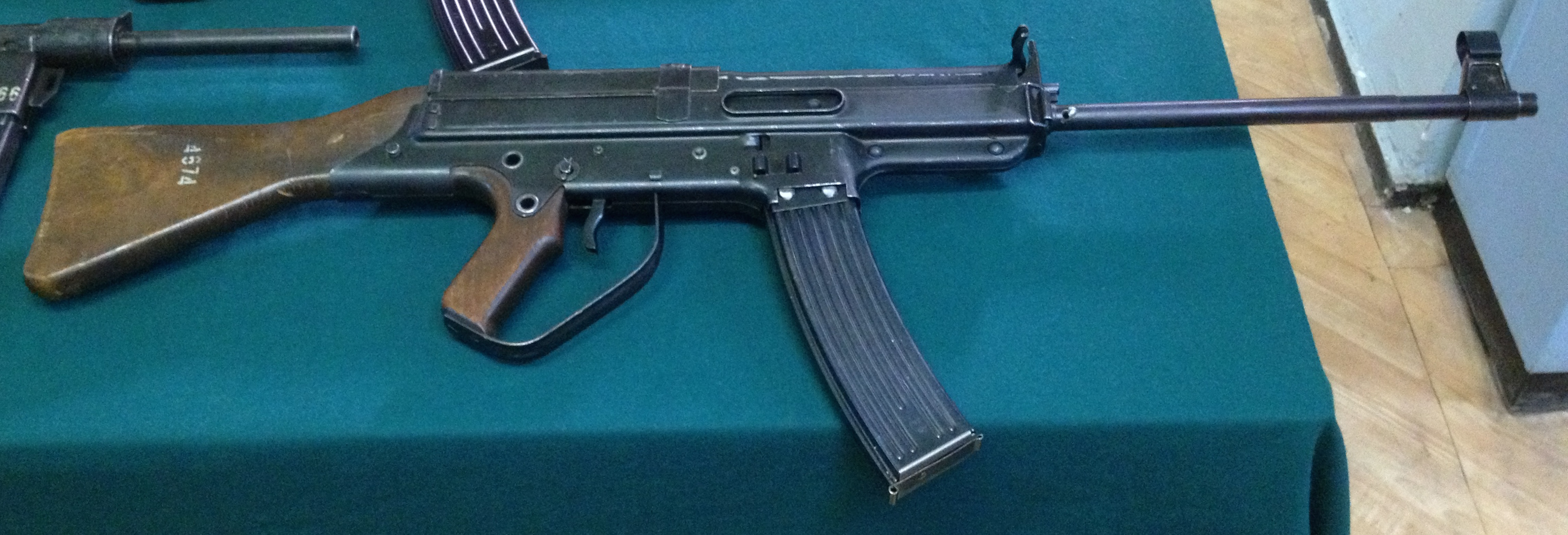
- Late war German prototype named Grossfuss Sturmgewehr (or Horn Stg)
- Type: Assault rifle
- Place of origin: Nazi Germany

Service history
- Used by: Nazi Germany
- Wars: World War II

Production history
- No. built: 9

Specifications
- Mass: 4.7 kg (10.4 lb)
- Length: 930 mm (36.6 in)
- Barrel length: 410 mm (16.1 in)
- Cartridge: 7.92×33mm Kurz
- Caliber: 7.9mm
- Action: Gas-delayed blowback
- Rate of fire: 500–550 rpm
- Muzzle velocity: 633 m/s
- Feed system: 30-round detachable StG 44 box magazine
- Sights: Iron, fixed to 300 m

Grossfuss Sturmgewehr was a prototype assault rifle designed during World War II by Kurt Horn at the Grossfuss company better known for their contribution to the German arsenal made with the MG 42.

== History ==
In the closing stage of the war, nine of the Grossfuss Sturmgewehr prototypes were captured by the advancing Red Army; five of these were found at the Kummersdorf testing site. These guns were given the name "Avtomat Horn" (Horn assault rifle) in the Soviet documents analyzing them. The Soviets also captured schematics for the gun and the designer himself. (Horn spent most of his time in the USSR at factory Number 74, later known as Izmash, where other famous German weapons designers were held, including Hugo Schmeisser, etc.)

Although the total number of Grossfuss Sturmgewehrs manufactured is not known, the numerous differences (noted by the Soviets) in part dimensions between the blueprints and the captured exemplars pointed to the experimental nature of the guns, suggesting that design adjustments were still being made.

According to the personal notes of Horn, the Heereswaffenamt requirements for this gun were as follows: it had to use the blowback principle of operation, use the ammunition and magazines of the MKb 42(H), have a cyclic rate of fire of 500 rounds per minute, a mass of 4 kg, and have the same barrel and overall length as the MKb 42(H). The requirement to use blowback as principle of operation was interpreted as asking for a gun that was cheap to build, because it translated in a simple design with few parts. The 7.92×33mm Kurz cartridge was however considerably more powerful than the pistol rounds used in submachine guns, so it would have normally required a bolt weighing about 1.5 kg, which was difficult to reconcile with the target weight for the gun.

Kurt Horn found an innovative solution to this problem, the gas delayed blowback (German: Gasdruckverschluss). The idea was relatively simple: part of the gases escaping from the chamber were redirected in the direction opposite to the rearward movement of the bolt; their pressure pushed against a piston connected to the bolt itself, thus decelerating the rearward movement of the latter. This method of operation allowed Horn to reduce the weight of the bolt to about 0.8–0.9 kg.

More or less the same idea was employed by Karl Barnitzke in the design of the better known Gustloff Volksturmgewehr (MP 507). However Barnitzke's design was far less efficient. Whereas Horn's design captured gas escaping from the breech, in Barnitzke's the gas was collected through four small holes near the muzzle, far too late to have much impact on the initial rearward acceleration of the bolt, which in the VG 1-5 weighted 1.4 kg.

Kinematics of the Grossfuß Sturmgewehr's operating system

In Horn's gun, one end of the piston is connected to the bolt by a joint and the other end is connected to the receiver by a small spring. The piston also exhibits an interesting sideways motion. As the bolt moves further backward, the piston moved slightly sideways as well, allowing most of the gas to escape without exercising further pressure. The role of the small spring was to ensure the return of the piston's head into position on the counter-recoil.

The gun's sights are fixed to 300 meters. It has a three-way selector between single, automatic fire, and safe position. The bolt has two handles, one on each side and these resemble horns. They were found rather unergonomical by the Soviet testers because they could hit the hand on automatic fire. The length of the draw for the bolt in order to cock the gun was also found to be unpleasantly long, especially from the prone position. The weapon would have been cheap to manufacture en masse. The only milled parts were the barrel and the bolt head.

One of captured Grossfuss Sturmgewehrs was tested by the GAU. It fired about 1,900 rounds without stoppages. Its accuracy was basically on par with the MP 43, even though the length of its sighting line was considerably shorter (266 vs. 418 mm).

Although the existence of the Grossfuss Sturmgewehr and its basic principle of operation became known in the West in the decade following the end of the war, hardly anything else transpired from behind the Iron Curtain. According to a 1958 book of the Army Ordnance Corps:

The firm of Grossfuss in Dobelin produced a unique retarded blowback gas-actuated system, no specimens of which has ever been seen. The Grossfuss weapon was reported exhibited to the Spree [sic] Ministry Waffenkommission, but apparently never reached WaPruf 2 [Dept. for Development and Testing of the Heereswaffenamt]. Development was dated late 1944 or early 1945.

A single, slightly incomplete exemplar remains in existence at the Military Historical Museum of Artillery, Engineers and Signal Corps in Saint Petersburg.

Immediately after the war, the gas-delayed blowback principle was used by some Soviet prototypes, for example the TKB-454 made by the Tula designer German A. Korobov.

== See also ==
- List of 7.92×33mm Kurz firearms
- Gas-delayed blowback firearms
- List of assault rifles
