= MKb-42 =

MKb-42 is an abbreviation for Maschinenkarabiner 42, one of two German assault rifles:

- the Haenel Maschinenkarabiner 42(H)
- the Walther Maschinenkarabiner 42(W)
