= Maschinenkarabiner 42 =

Maschinenkarabiner 42 can refer to either of two German World War II automatic rifles:

- Maschinenkarabiner 42(H) - produced by Haenel
- Maschinenkarabiner 42(W) - produced by Walther
