= AS-44 =

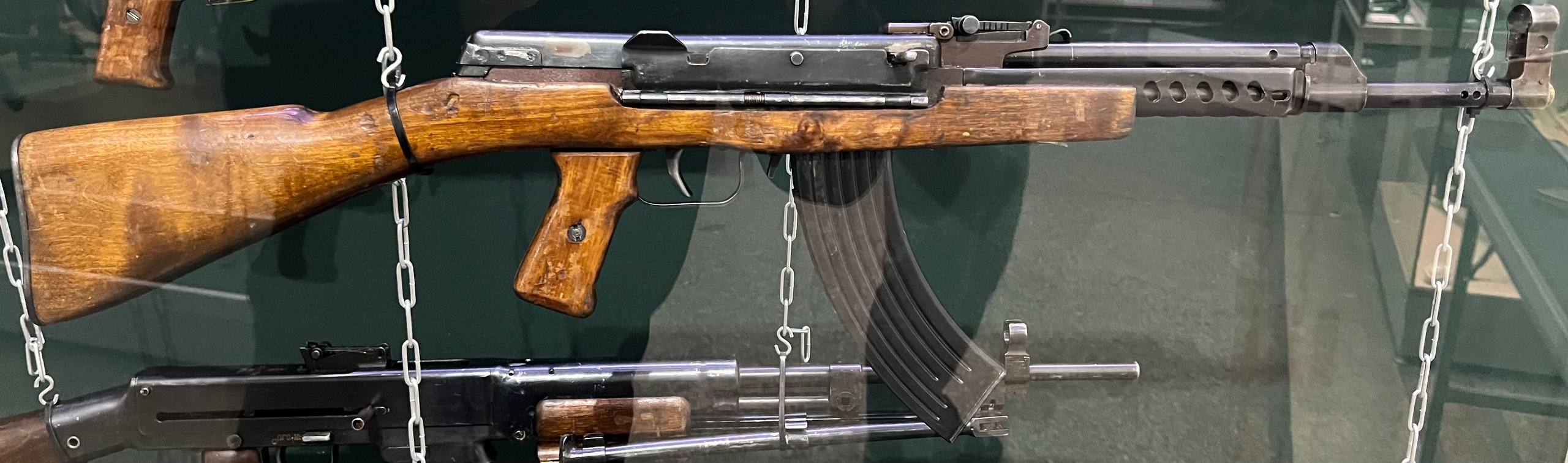
- AS-44 assault rifle
- Type: Assault rifle
- Place of origin: Soviet Union

Service history
- In service: 1944–1945 (limited)
- Used by: Soviet Union
- Wars: World War II

Production history
- Designer: Alexey Sudayev
- Designed: 1944–1945
- Produced: 1944–1945
- Variants: Seven different prototypes

Specifications
- Mass: 5.6 kg (12 lb)
- Length: 1,000 mm (39 in)
- Barrel length: 505 mm (20 in)
- Cartridge: 7.62×41mm
- Action: Gas-operated open tilting bolt (First six prototypes) Gas-delayed blowback (Seventh prototype)
- Rate of fire: 520 rounds per minute
- Effective firing range: 800 m (875 yd)
- Feed system: 30 round detachable box magazine
- Sights: Hooded front post and adjustable tangent notch rear iron sights graduated from 100 – 800 meters

The AS-44 (Avtomat Sudayeva, Russian: Автома́т Суда́ева, АС-44) is a series of prototype Soviet assault rifles designed and developed by Alexey Sudayev in 1944–1945, they were produced in limited numbers and tested in 1944–1945, but its development ended in 1946 due to the death of its designer.

== History ==
In 1942 Soviet forces began encountering the new German Mkb-42(H) assault rifle being used by German forces on the battlefield and captured them. The Soviets were impressed by this new weapon that they wanted to make their own. In the summer of 1943, the Soviets began development of a new intermediate cartridge and the Soviet M43 7.62×41mm intermediate cartridge was developed and provided to Soviet small arms design bureaus to design a series of new weapons around this new cartridge which included a semi-automatic carbine, an automatic rifle, and a squad automatic weapon for the Soviet military. Design competitions were announced and designs for an automatic carbine were submitted for testing from various designers including Sudayev, Tokarev, Korovin, Shpagin, Bulkin, Fedorov, Simonov, Dementiev, Korobov, and Kalashnikov which lasted up to 3 trials before Kalashnikov's rifle was chosen for adoption in 1947. In May 1944, Alexey Sudayev who had already designed the successful PPS submachine gun delivered the first and fourth models of his AS-44 for tests. The AS-44 successfully met the competition's requirements and in the spring of 1945 an experimental batch of them were manufactured at the Tula Arms Factory. During the summer of 1945, these were sent for testing in the Moscow, Leningrad, Central Asian, and Transcaucasian military districts. The tests determined the AS-44 was reliable, but not as accurate, or long ranged as the Mosin-Nagant rifle currently in service. When fired from its integrated bipod its range and accuracy were judged to be superior to that of sub-machine guns in Soviet service. However, the AS-44 was overweight at 5.6 kg (12 lb) and its accuracy, when fired without its bipod was considered inferior. In spite of positive evaluations, the AS-44 was not approved for mass production at that time. The next set of modifications and trials would have started in early 1946 but Sudayev became ill and died on August 17, 1946, which prevented this from occurring.

== Description ==
Sudayev built seven different prototypes with each having slightly different features, barrel length, and weight for the Soviet assault rifle design competition that would result in the adopted winning design becoming the standard issue assault rifle for the Soviet military. The layout of the AS-44 is similar to what would be the AK-47 with a fixed wood stock, wood handguard, wood pistol grip, curved detachable 30-round magazine, hooded post front sight and tangent notch rear sight, dust cover, and bayonet mount with other features including a heat shield, flash suppressor, and metal bipod. The AS-44 made use of stamped components to reduce production costs and speed production.

- The first prototype was a self-loading, selective fire weapon capable of both single or multiple-shots, the cocking handle and combination safety/selector switch were on the left hand side of the receiver towards the rear. The first six prototypes used a tilting bolt which was pioneered by the Czechoslovaks in the ZB vz. 26 machine gun, and also used in the StG 44.
- The second prototype had a revised gas chamber and the cocking handle was moved to the right hand side above the magazine. There was a collapsible wooden pistol grip and the fire selector switch and safety were moved inside the front of the trigger guard. The gun weighed 4.7 kg (10.4 lb), had an overall length of 990 mm (3 ft 3 in), and had a barrel length of 485 mm (1 ft 7 in).
- The third prototype was a fully automatic weapon without a fire selector. The dust cover on the right hand side was modified with two notches to provide a safety catch for the cocking handle while on the march. The barrel lacked a flash suppressor but it had three ports per side of the barrel in front of the front sight to act as a muzzle brake and there was no bayonet mount. The gun weighed 4.5 kg (9.9 lb), had an overall length of 900 mm (2 ft 11 in), and had a barrel length of 400 mm (1 ft 4 in).
- The fourth, fifth, and sixth prototypes differed from the third in that there was no muzzle brake, the safety and fire selector switches were moved to the left hand side of the receiver above the trigger guard. There were also bi-pod and bayonet mounts. The gun weighed 5.4 kg (11.9 lb), had an overall length of 1,030 mm (3 ft 5 in), and had a barrel length of 490–500 mm (1 ft 7 in – 1 ft 8 in).
- In October 1945, Sudayev presented a lightened version based on his fourth model called the OAS (Russian: облегчённый автомат Судаева, ОАС) for testing. The seventh prototype used a gas-delayed blowback action. Although lighter due to the deletion of its bi-pod its recoil, accuracy, and durability were negatively affected. The gun weighed 5.4 kg (11.9 lb), had an overall length of 1,030 mm (3 ft 5 in), and had a barrel length of 495 mm (1 ft 7 in).

== See also ==
- 7.62×39mm
- AK-47
- Assault rifle
- List of Russian inventions
- List of Russian weaponry
- MKb 42(H)
- MKb 42(W)
- PPS submachine gun
- StG 44
- Table of handgun and rifle cartridges

== Bibliography ==
- Болотин, Д. Н. (1995). История советского стрелкового оружия и патронов (PDF). Полигон. ISBN 5-85503-072-5.
- Попенкер, Максим; Марин, Милчев (2009). Вторая мировая: Война оружейников. Яуза, Эксмо. ISBN 978-5-699-33094-2.
- Попенкер, Максим; Марин, Милчев (2014). Стрелковое оружие Второй мировой: коллекционное издание. Яуза, Эксмо. ISBN 978-5-699-62535-2.
- Чумак, Р. Н. (2021). АК-47. История создания и принятия на вооружение Советской армии. Атлант. ISBN 978-5-60-443236-5.
