= StG 45(M) =

German assault rifle

Sturmgewehr 45(M)
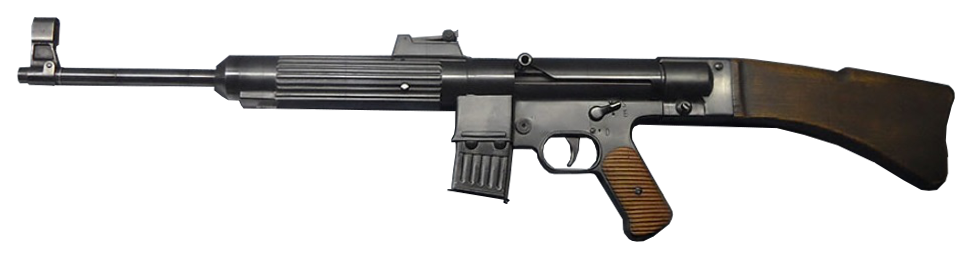
- The Sturmgewehr 45(M) with a 10-round magazine inserted
- Type: Assault rifle
- Place of origin: Nazi Germany

Service history
- In service: Never entered service
- Used by: Germany
- Wars: World War II

Production history
- Designer: Wilhelm Stähle
- Designed: 1944
- Manufacturer: Mauser
- Unit cost: 45 ℛ︁ℳ︁ (1945 estimate); €350 current equivalent
- Produced: 1945
- No. built: 30

Specifications
- Mass: 4 kg (8.8 lb) (with empty magazine)
- Length: 900 mm (35.4 in)
- Barrel length: 400 mm (16 in)
- Cartridge: 7.92×33mm Kurz (Pistolenpatrone 7.9mm M43)
- Action: Roller-delayed blowback
- Rate of fire: ≈450 rounds/min
- Muzzle velocity: ≈650 m/s (2,133 ft/s)
- Effective firing range: 300 m
- Maximum firing range: 800 m
- Feed system: 10 or 30-round detachable box magazine
- Sights: Rear: V-notch; front: hooded post

The StG 45(M) (abbreviation of Sturmgewehr 45, "Assault Rifle 45") sometimes referred to as the MP 45(M), was a prototype assault rifle developed by Mauser for the Wehrmacht at the end of World War II, using an innovative roller-delayed blowback operating system. It fired the 7.92×33mm Kurz (or "Pistolenpatrone 7.9mm") intermediate cartridge at a cyclic rate of around 450 rounds per minute.

== Overview ==
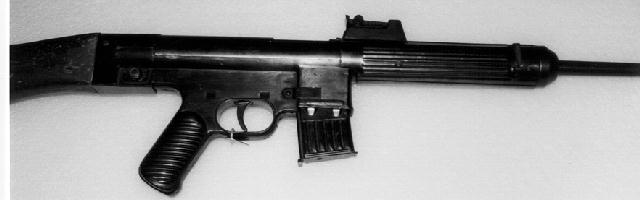
The early Mauser Gerät 06H prototype assault rifle

fluted (below) chamber in a blowback firearm prevents breaking of the cartridge.

The origin of this rifle can be traced back to the final years of World War II when Mauser engineers at the Light Weapon Development Group (Abteilung 37) at Oberndorf am Neckar designed the MKb Gerät 06 (Maschinenkarabiner Gerät 06 or "machine carbine device 06") prototype assault rifle chambered for the intermediate 7.92×33mm Kurz cartridge, first with the Gerät 06 model using a roller-locked mechanism which was unique for being gas operated, as opposed to recoil operation, originally adapted from the MG 42 machine gun, but with a fixed barrel and conventional gas-actuated piston rod. After observing bolt-bounce during firing trials of the roller locked Gerät 03 prototype semi-automatic rifle Dr. Karl Maier, one of Mauser's scientists at the time, realized that with careful attention to the mechanical ratios, the gas system could be omitted. The resultant weapon, the Gerät 06H (the "H" suffix is an abbreviation for halbverriegelt or "half-locked") was assigned the designation StG 45(M) (Sturmgewehr 45(M)).

Though appearing simple, developing the roller-delayed blowback firearm action was a hard technical and personal effort, as German engineering, mathematical and other scientists had to work together on a like-it-or-not basis led by Ott-Helmuth von Lossnitzer, the director of Mauser Werke's Weapons Research Institute and Weapons Development Group. Experiments showed roller-delayed blowback firearms exhibited bolt-bounce. To counter bolt- bounce the perfect angle choice on the nose of the bolt head had to be found. Mathematician Dr. Karl Maier provided analysis of the components, assemblies in the development project. In December 1943 Maier came up with an equation that engineers used to change the angles in the receiver to 45° and 27° on the locking piece relative to the longitudinal axis solving the bolt-bounce problem. With these angles the geometrical transmission ratio of the bolt carrier to the bolt head became 3:1, so the rear bolt carrier was forced to move three times faster than the bolt head. The rearward forces on the bolt carrier and receiver were 2:1. The force and impulse transmitted to the receiver increases with the force and impulse transmitted to the bolt carrier. Making the bolt carrier heavier lessens the recoil velocity. For Mausers Gerät 06H/StG 45(M) project Maier assumed a 120 g bolt head and 360 g bolt carrier (1 to 3 ratio). However, the design required that the bolt started moving while the bullet was still in the barrel and the spent case fully pressurized. Using traditionally cut chambers resulted in separated cartridge case heads during testing. This problem was solved by cutting 18 longitudinal gas relief flutes in the chamber. Fluting the end of the chamber allowed combustion gasses to float the neck and front of the cartridge case providing pressure equalization between the front outer surface of the cartridge case and its interior. During the process, the front cartridge case would typically show blackened, longitudinal scorch marks around the diameter of the case which was characteristic for later roller-delayed blowback-operated small arms, which also used the fluted chamber principle.

The roller-delayed blowback firearm action was patented by Mauser’s Wilhelm Stähle and Ludwig Vorgrimler.

Like the German FG 42 battle rifle/automatic rifle and the Sturmgewehr 44 assault rifle, the StG 45(M) was one of the first inline firearms incorporating a "straight-line" recoil configuration. This layout places both the center of gravity and the position of the shoulder stock nearly in line with the longitudinal axis of the barrel bore, a feature increasing controllability by reducing muzzle rise during burst or automatic fire. The elevated sight line over the bore axis layout was also adopted from these designs as it helps to extend the "battle zero" range. The current trend for elevated sights and flatter shooting higher-velocity intermediate cartridges in assault rifles is in part due to a desire to further extend the maximum point-blank range, which makes such a rifle easier to use.

The StG 45(M) was intended to replace the Sturmgewehr 44 assault rifle, because the latter was rather expensive and time-consuming to produce. Compared to the StG44's cost of 70 ℛ︁ℳ︁, the StG45(M)'s calculated cost was 45 ℛ︁ℳ︁. Like the Sturmgewehr 44 the weapon made extensive use of (for the 1940s) advanced cost-saving pressed and stamped steel components rather than machined parts. Parts kits for only 30 complete rifles were produced before the war ended. The StG 45(M) had an elevated iron sights line over the bore axis in part to optimize the maximum point-blank range of the compared to full-power rifle cartridges modest external ballistic performance of the 7.92×33mm Kurz cartridge, ergonomics and recoil management.

While the StG45(M) was intended to use the same 30-round magazine as its predecessor, the rifle is commonly pictured with the 10-round magazine designed for the Volkssturmgewehr. The shorter magazine was used by Mauser engineers during testing, as its lower profile was easier to use when test-firing at the Mauser facility range.

The Bundeswehr Museum of German Defense Technology in Koblenz has one of these specimen in its collection.

== Post–World War II developments ==
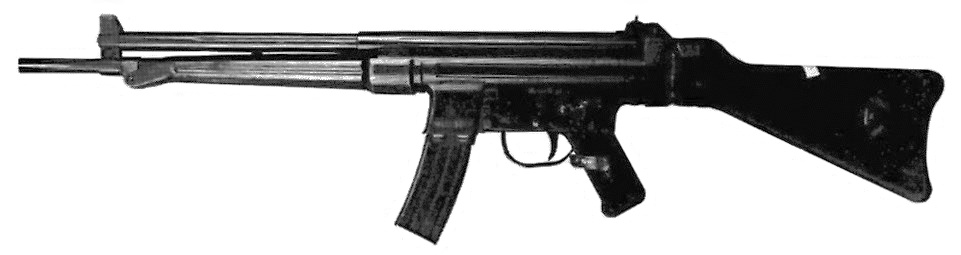
The CEAM Modèle 1950, a French effort to put the StG 45(M) concept into mass production. Chambered in .30 Carbine.

The German technicians involved in developing the Sturmgewehr 45 continued their research in France at CEAM. The StG45 mechanism was modified by Ludwig Vorgrimler and Theodor Löffler at the Mulhouse facility between 1946 and 1949. Three versions were made, chambered in .30 Carbine, 7.92×33mm Kurz as well as the 7.65×35mm cartridge developed by Cartoucherie de Valence and adopted in 1948. A 7.5×38mm cartridge using a partial aluminium bullet was abandoned in 1947. Löffler's design, designated the Carabine Mitrailleuse Modèle 1950, was retained for trials among 12 different prototypes designed by CEAM, MAC, and MAS. Vorgrimler later went to work at CETME in Spain and developed the line of CETME automatic rifles.

Germany eventually purchased the licence for the CETME design and manufactured the Heckler & Koch G3 as well as an entire line of weapons built on the same system, one of the most famous being the MP5.

A few other post–World War II weapons used the roller-delayed locking system, such as the SIG SG 510.

== See also ==
- StG 44
- HIW VSK carbine
- Wimmersperg Spz-kr
- List of 7.92×33mm Kurz firearms
- List of assault rifles
