= Tilting bolt =

Locking mechanism used in self-reloading firearms and straight-pull repeating rifles

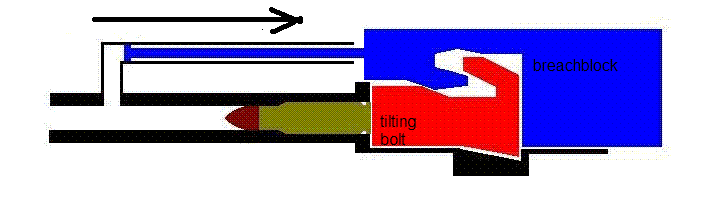
The bolt drops down into receiver recess and locks on bolt closing.

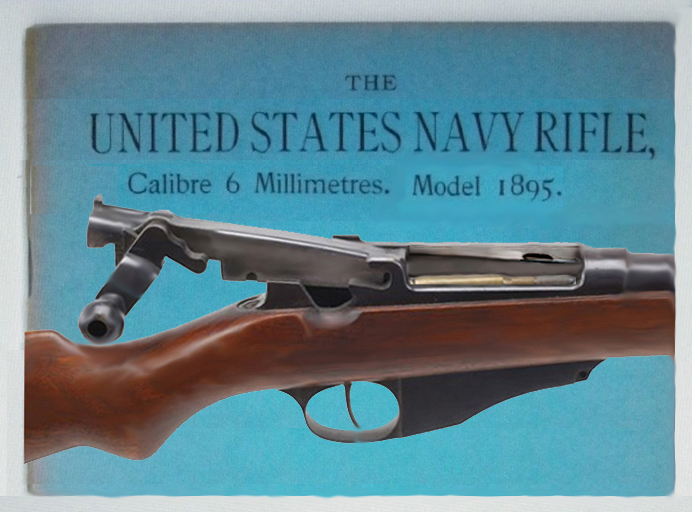
M1895 Lee Navy with an open bolt, demonstrating its vertical locking surface on its bottom in front of the handle

Tilting bolt action is a type of locking mechanism often used in self-loading firearms and, rarely, in straight-pull repeating rifles. Essentially, the design consists of a moving bolt driven by some mechanism, most often a piston with gas pressure from the gas port behind the muzzle. The bolt drops down into receiver recess and locks on bolt closing. Tilting the bolt up and down locks-unlocks in the breech. This tilting allows gas pressure in the barrel from firing the gun to lower to safe levels before the cartridge case is ejected.

For handgun design, the tilting barrel as used in the Browning, is a similar operating mechanism. The tilting bolt has lost favor in contemporary firearm design of rifle caliber to locking systems such as the rotating bolt due to reasons such as complexity in manufacture and expense in resources, increased wearing of the surfaces acted on, higher demands on the receiver due to transfer of locking stresses to it (e. g., it can't be made from aluminium or stamped sheet steel) & better potential accuracy of rotating bolt. Yet it is widespread in vintage firearms listed below.

== Examples ==
- FN Model 1949, semi-automatic rifle
- FN FAL, select-fire battle rifle
- Howa Type 64, select-fire battle rifle
- SKS, semi-automatic carbine
- SVT-40, semi-automatic rifle
- Kbsp wz. 1938M, prototype semi-automatic rifle
- AS-44, prototype select-fire assault rifle
- ZH-29, semi-automatic rifle
- vz. 52 rifle, semi-automatic rifle
- MAS-49, semi-automatic rifle
- Pauza P-50, semi-automatic anti-material rifle
- PTRS-41, semi-automatic anti-tank rifle
- StG 44 & MKb 42(H), select-fire assault rifle
- Ag m/42, semi-automatic rifle
- ZB vz. 26, light machine gun
- Bren light machine gun, light machine gun
- Uk vz. 59, general purpose machine gun
- Rudd Arms AR-180, assault rifle; uniquely tilts upwards to lock and uses Delayed Blowback for action.
- M50 Reising, submachine gun; uniquely tilts upwards to lock and uses Delayed Blowback for action.
- SIG MKMO, submachine gun; uniquely tilts upwards to lock and uses Delayed Blowback for action.
- LS-26, light machine gun; uniquely uses recoil operation for action.
- Savage Model 99, lever action rifle
- Olin-Winchester SALVO rifle, prototype twin-barrel assault rifle
- AO-36, prototype twin-barrel assault rifle
- SK-46, prototype semi-automatic rifle
- SIG Model U, prototype semi-automatic rifle
- CZ-38, prototype semi-automatic rifle
- Marlin Levermatic lever-action rifle
- Stevens model 425 lever-action rifle
- Winchester model 30

== See also ==
- Falling-block action
- Locked breech
- Rolling block
- Break action
- Bolt action
- Rotating bolt
- Glossary of firearms terms
