= Alexey Sudayev =

Soviet firearm designer

- Sudayev c. 1943-1946
- Born: 23 August [O.S. 10 August] 1912; Alatyr, Alatyrsky Uyezd, Simbirsk Governorate, Russian Empire
- Died: 17 August 1946 (aged 32); Moscow, Soviet Union
- Burial place: Vagankovo Cemetery, Moscow
- Education: Gorky Industrial Institute; Dzerzhinsky Artillery Academy
- Military career
- Allegiance: Soviet Union
- Branch: Red Army
- Service years: 1934-1935; 1941-1946
- Rank: Lieutenant
- Conflicts: Great Patriotic War
- Awards: Order of Lenin

Alexey Ivanovich Sudayev (Russian: Алексе́й Ива́нович Суда́ев; 23 August 1912 – 17 August 1946) was a Soviet firearm designer.

== Biography ==
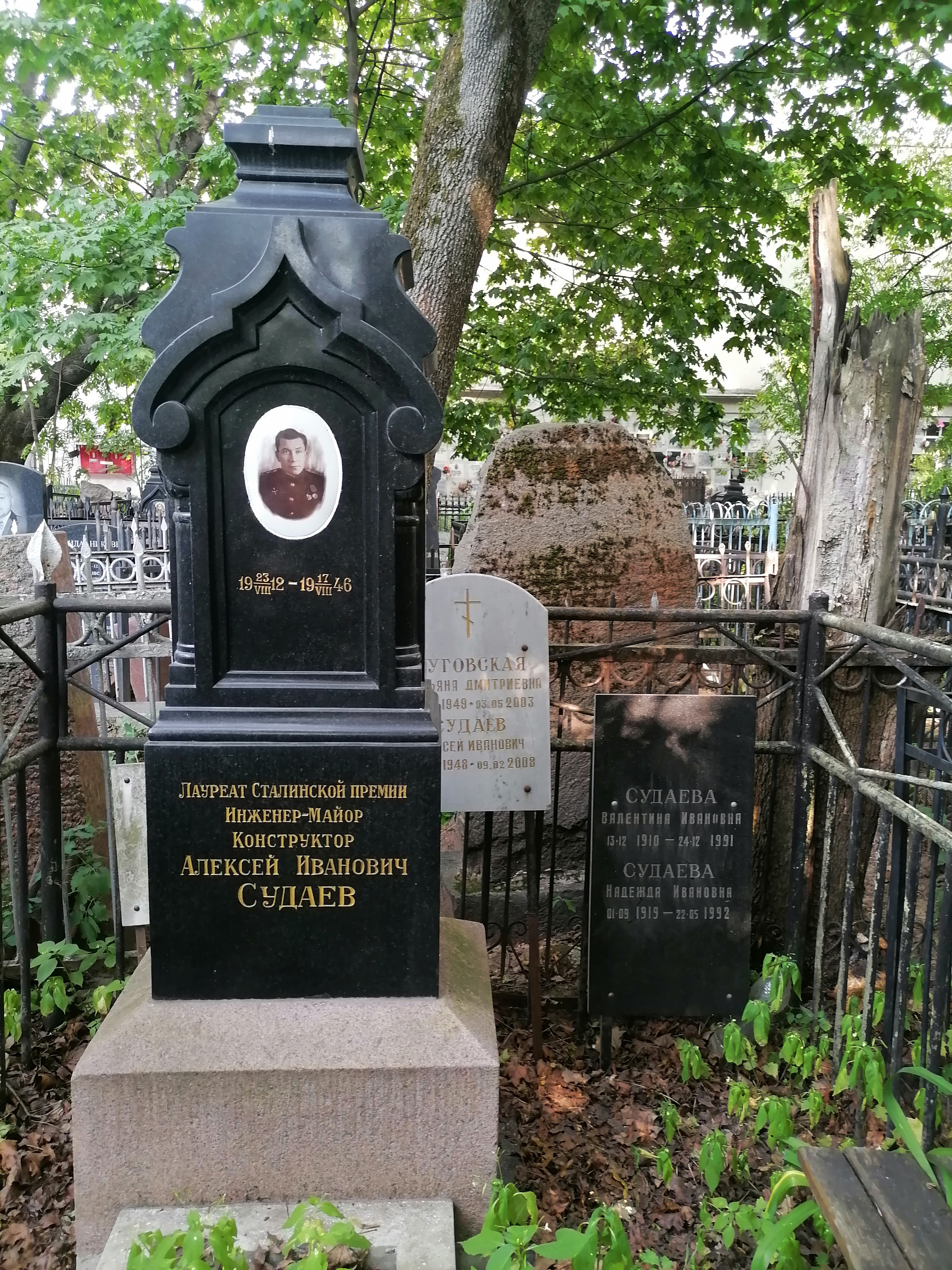
Sudayev's grave

He was born on 23 August 1912 in the city of Alatyr.

His father Ivan Nilovich Sudayev, a telegraph mechanic for the postal and telegraphic district in Kazan, died in 1924, leaving his mother dependent on 12-year-old Alexei and his two sisters.

In 1929 Sudayev graduated from a vocational school and began working as a locksmith. After graduating in 1932 from the Gorky Construction Technical School (Department of Industrial Transport), he worked in "Soyuztransstroi" as a site technician in the village of Rudnichnoye of Satka District in the Ural Region (now the Chelyabinsk Region). During this period (1933–1934) appeared his first inventions "Automatic firing from a machine gun through the action of infrared rays" and "Gasometer".

In the autumn of 1934, Sudayev served in the Red Army, in the railway troops, where he showed great interest in weapons. Following his discharge, he entered the Gorky Industrial Institute where he studied from 1936 to 1938. During his studies he showed considerable creative abilities. He joined the Communist Party of the Soviet Union in 1940.

At this time, the Dzerzhinsky Artillery Academy created a school of gunsmiths, which recruited students from various universities who had a tendency to invent and design. In 1941, Lieutenant Sudayev defended his diploma project (7.62 mm machine gun) with honors in German language, majoring as an engineer. He was then recalled into the Red Army following Operation Barbarossa.

He died in 1946 of a gastric ulcer and was buried at the Vagankovo Cemetery in Moscow.

== Awards ==
- USSR State Prize (1946)
- Order of Lenin
- Order of the Patriotic War 1st class
- Order of the Red Star
- Medal "For the Defence of Leningrad"
- Medal "For the Victory over Germany in the Great Patriotic War 1941–1945"

== Inventions ==
- anti-aircraft machine gun mount (1941)
- PPS submachine gun
- AS-44 assault rifle

== Sources ==
- Д. Н. Болотин. Советское стрелковое оружие. М., Воениздат, 1983
- Судаев Ал. Ив. (1912–46) // Большой энциклопедический словарь (в 2-х тт.). / редколл., гл. ред. А. М. Прохоров. том 2. М., "Советская энциклопедия", 1991. стр.425
