= Maschinenkarabiner 42(W) =

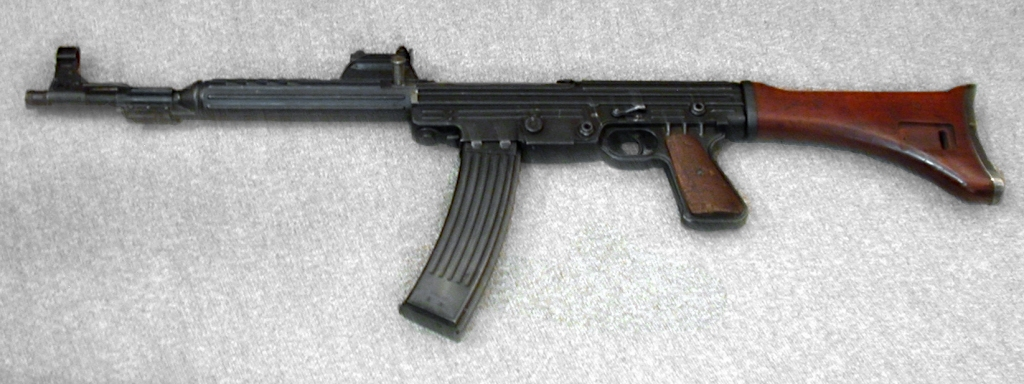
- The Walther MKb 42(W)
- Type: Assault rifle
- Place of origin: Germany

Service history
- In service: 1942 – 1945
- Used by: Germany

Production history
- Designer: Walther
- Designed: 1940 – 1941
- Manufacturer: Walther
- Produced: 1942
- No. built: 200

Specifications
- Mass: 4.4 kg (9.7 lb) empty
- Length: 933 mm (37 in)
- Barrel length: 409 mm (16 in)
- Cartridge: 7.92×33mm Kurz
- Action: Gas-operated, rotating bolt, selective-fire
- Rate of fire: 600 rpm
- Muzzle velocity: 650 m/s (2,100 ft/s)
- Effective firing range: 600 m (660 yd) single fire 300 m (330 yd) burst 200 m (220 yd) continuous
- Maximum firing range: 800 m (870 yd) sighted
- Feed system: 30 round detachable box magazine
- Sights: Adjustable iron sights, rear: V-notch; front: hooded post

The Maschinenkarabiner 42(W) or MKb 42(W) (Machine carbine model of 1942 (Walther)) is an early German assault rifle designed in 1940 – 1941 by Walther during World War II. The Mkb 42(W), and the more successful Maschinenkarabiner 42(H) (MKb 42(H)) designed by Haenel, were predecessors of the Sturmgewehr 44 (StG 44) assault rifle.

== History ==
As early as 1918 the German Army began to study the feasibility of an intermediate round and rifle. However, a combination of military orthodoxy, limited funds and the arms development restrictions of the Versailles Treaty led Germany to adopt the Mauser Karabiner 98K on 21 June 1935. From 1939 onwards the German Army gathered combat reports which were analyzed to determine combat conditions and tactical trends in order to develop new tactics and equipment requirements. One of the lessons which re-emerged was the existing 7.92x57mm rifle cartridge was more powerful and long ranged than what was needed. Since most combat took place at ranges less than 400 m (440 yd) a less powerful round could be used, which would mean a soldier could carry more ammunition, the weapon could be shorter, lighter and with less recoil the gun could be an automatic. Submachine guns had existed since the First World War, but they used pistol caliber ammunition and lacked both the range and accuracy the German Army was looking for. A new intermediate cartridge was needed and the 7.92×33mm Kurz was designed in response to this requirement. The specification called for a new weapon which was larger than a submachine gun, more accurate, longer ranged and more maneuverable than a full sized rifle.

== Design ==
Contracts for weapons firing the 7.92×33mm Kurz round were issued to both Haenel and Walther, who were asked to submit prototype weapons under the name Maschinenkarabiner 1942. The (H) and (W) in their titles referred to the first initial of each guns manufacturer Haenel and Walther to differentiate the two. The MKb 42(W) fired from a closed bolt and used a hammer firing system, while the MKb 42(H) fired from an open bolt and used a striker for firing. Both used a large amount of stamped parts to speed and simplify construction while keeping down costs. The parts were then riveted or spot welded together. In December 1940, a prototype rifle each from Haenel and Walther was tested by the HWA at Kummersdorf. Both designs were tested on the Eastern Front during 1942 and the Haenel design proved superior to Walther's MKb 42(W). The German Army ordered a number of changes be made to the MKb 42(H) and the designation for the new rifle was MP 43. The majority of the MP 43's features came from the MKb 42(H), with the hammer firing system and closed bolt coming from the MKb 42(W).

== See also ==
- Sudayev AS-44
- Fedorov Avtomat
- Kalashnikov AK-47
- List of 7.92×33mm Kurz firearms
- List of assault rifles
