= Wimmersperg Spz =

Family of German assault rifles

- Type: Substitute assault rifle / light machine gun
- Place of origin: Nazi Germany

Production history
- Designer: Heinrich von Wimmersperg
- Designed: Autumn 1944-January 1945
- Variants: Spz-l, Spz-kr, Spz-kv

Specifications
- Length: 680 mm
- Cartridge: 7.92×33mm Kurz
- Caliber: 7.92 mm
- Action: Gas-operated
- Effective firing range: 400 m (440 yd)
- Feed system: 30-round box magazine
- Sights: Iron sights, ZF-4 scope

The Wimmersperg Spz ("Sp" stands for STEN-pistole 'STEN pistol', "z" for zweiteilig 'made of two parts') was a family of German assault rifles that was in the planning stage during the latter days of Nazi Germany.

== Overview ==
The overall weapon is largely made up from Sten Mk II submachine gun components (which the Germans copied as Gerät Potsdam), most notably the receiver and buttstock. The magazine and magazine release are from the StG-44, and so were the barrel blanks. There were three variants designed. The Spz-l (lange Bauart, long variant) used a conventional layout with separate pistol grip, while in the Spz-kr (kurze Bauart mit Regler für Serienfeuer, short model with burst-fire switch) and Spz-kv (kurze Bauart mit Verschlußzündung, striker-fired short model) the magazine itself was the pistol grip. The Spz-l and Spz-kr were hammer-fired, while the Spz-kv was striker-fired. All variants were gas-operated, had swappable barrels, and were designed for selective fire. Single-shot fire could be applied by pulling the trigger half way, while pulling the trigger further to the rear produced burst fire (except Spz-l). This function predates the similar operation used on the present day Steyr AUG series of rifles.

There is no trace of these weapons in official Nazi documents or even in some German manufacturer's archives. Wimmersperg however had contacts with Mauser, Simson & Co, and Fokker for some of his other designs. It is possible that Wimmersperg designed the Spz's on behalf of the metal goods factory Spreewerke.

Currently, there is only one true-to-scale museum grade replica of the Spz-l in the world. This was reconstructed in full scale by a German designer on the basis of the original construction plans and then built by him.

The gun was designed by Heinrich von Wimmersperg, who was born in Prague in 1900. He then grew up in Vienna, where he passed his Matura and studied mechanical engineering up to his intermediate diploma. From 1936 on he lived in Berlin, where he initially worked as a freelance weapons designer on his own weapons developments. With the beginning of World War II, he worked directly for the Wehrmacht, Luftwaffe and Navy of the German Reich on various weapons projects until the end of the war. In 1947 he emigrated to the USA and settled in Detroit, where he died in 1985. From Detroit, he worked as an independent designer for the U.S. Department of Defense on various armament projects. He also developed numerous occupant protection systems for passenger cars.

He also designed the Wimmersperg Maschinengewehr in 1937, a double-barreled, combined gas/recoil operated firearm fed from either magazines or a belt feed with 7.92×57mm cartridges — which was unusual for that the top barrel acted as a gas piston. The over/under barrels fire and reload vice versa. In his later years, he patented designs for car seats for infants and toddlers.

== See also ==
- List of assault rifles
- Interdynamics MKS - weapon with similar configuration
