= StG 44 =

WW2-era German assault rifle

Sturmgewehr 44
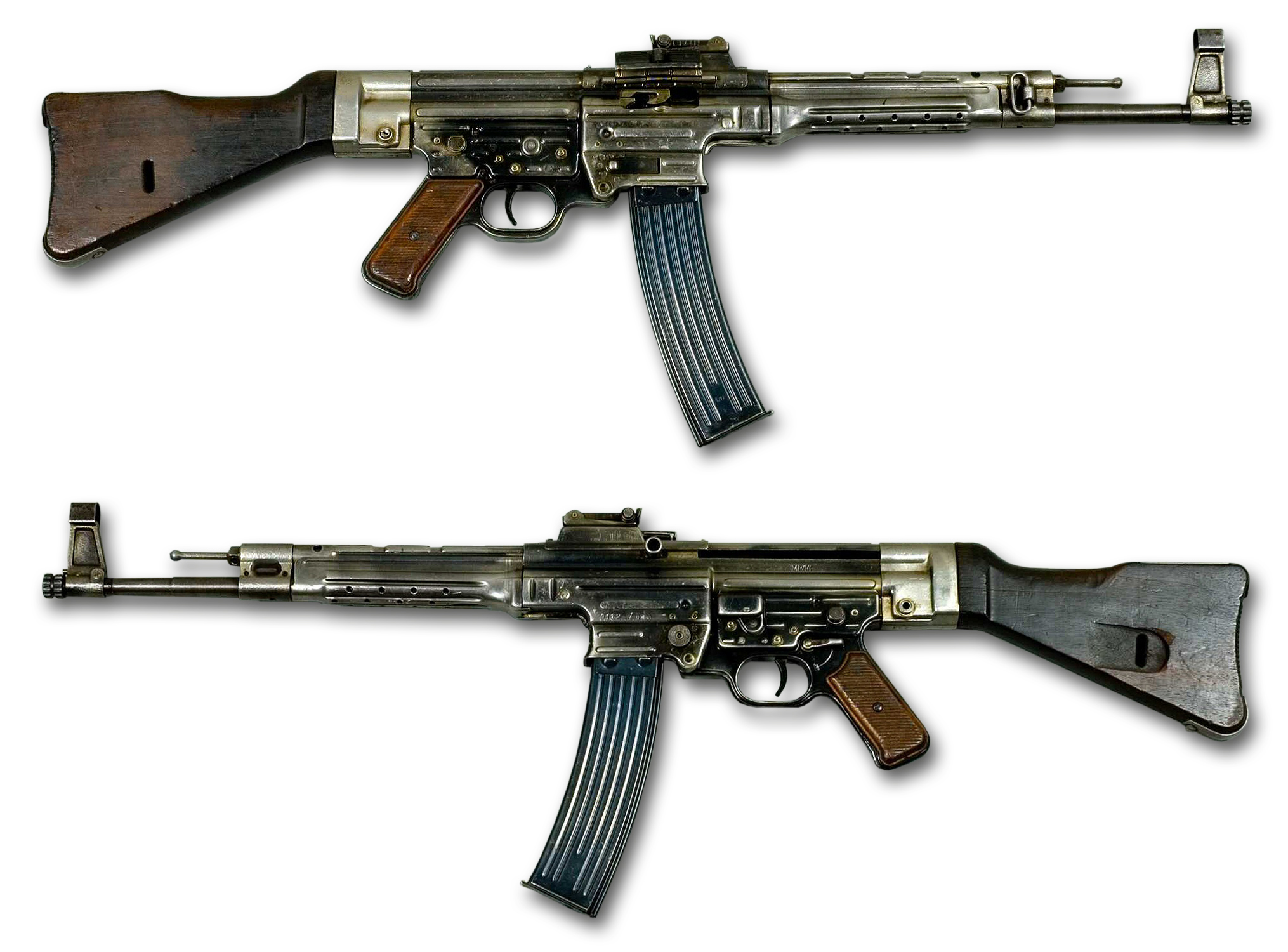
- MP 44 (StG 44) from the collections of the Swedish Army Museum
- Type: Assault rifle
- Place of origin: Germany

Service history
- In service: 1943–1945 (Nazi Germany); 1949–1962 (East Germany); 1943–present (Other countries)
- Used by: See Users
- Wars: World War II; First Indochina War; Algerian War; Vietnam War; Lebanese Civil War; Ogaden War; Syrian Civil War; Russo-Ukrainian War (limited)

Production history
- Designer: Hugo Schmeisser
- Designed: 1938–1943
- Manufacturer: C. G. Haenel Waffen und Fahrradfabrik; Sauer & Sohn; CITEDEF (post-war); Steyr-Daimler-Puch
- Unit cost: 70 ℛ︁ℳ︁ (1944); €550 current equivalent
- Produced: 1943–1945
- No. built: 425,977
- Variants: MKb 42(H), MKb 42(W), MP 43, MP 43/1, MP 44

Specifications
- Mass: 4.6 kg (10 lb 2 oz) unloaded; 5.13 kg (11 lb 5 oz) loaded
- Length: 94 cm (37 in)
- Barrel length: 42 cm (16.5 in)
- Cartridge: 7.92×33mm Kurz
- Action: Gas-operated long-stroke piston, closed tilting bolt, selective fire
- Rate of fire: ~500-600 rounds/min
- Muzzle velocity: 685 m/s (2,247 ft/s)
- Effective firing range: 300 m (330 yd) (automatic); 600 m (660 yd) (semi-automatic)
- Feed system: 30-round detachable box magazine
- Sights: Adjustable sights, rear: V-notch; front: hooded post

The StG 44 (abbreviation of Sturmgewehr 44, "assault rifle 44") (Note: As Rottman points out, in a military context the German word Sturm means "assault", making terms such as "storm rifle" or "storm assault rifle" erroneous.) is a German assault rifle developed during World War II by Hugo Schmeisser. It is also known by its early designations as the MP 43 and MP 44 (Maschinenpistole 43 and 44). The StG 44 was an improvement of an earlier design, the Maschinenkarabiner 42(H).

The StG 44 was the first successful assault rifle, with features including an intermediate cartridge, controllable automatic fire, a more compact design than a battle rifle with a higher rate of fire, and being designed primarily for hitting targets within a few hundred metres. Other rifles at the time were designed to hit targets at greater ranges, but this was found to be in excess of the range in which most combat engagements actually took place.

The StG 44 fulfilled its role effectively, particularly on the Eastern Front, offering a greatly increased volume of fire compared to standard infantry rifles. The StG largely influenced the Soviet AK-47, introduced two years after the war concluded. The StG's influence can still be seen in modern assault rifles, which, after World War II, became the global standard for infantry rifles.

== Description ==
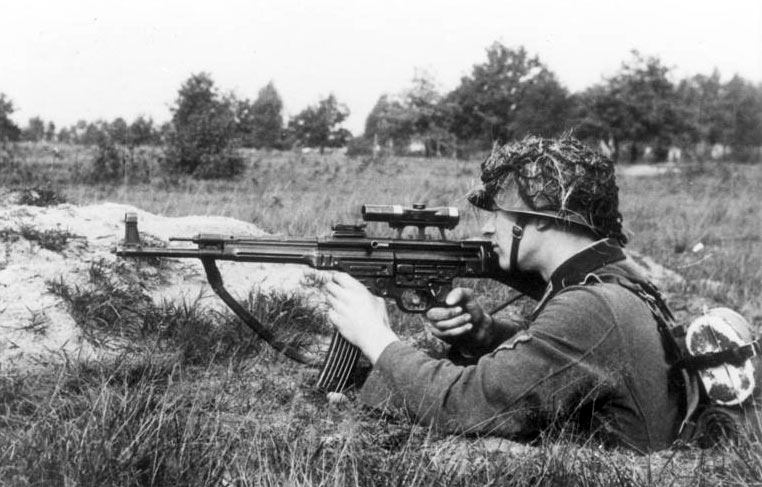
A soldier demonstrates the transitional MP 43/1 variant, used to determine the suitability of the rifle for sniping purposes, October 1943. The rifle is fitted with a ZF 4 telescopic sight.

MP 43, MP 44, and StG 44 were different designations for what was essentially the same rifle with minor updates in production. The variety in nomenclatures resulted from the complicated bureaucracy in Nazi Germany. Developed from the Mkb 42(H) "machine carbine", the StG 44 combined the characteristics of a carbine, submachine gun, and automatic rifle. StG is an abbreviation of Sturmgewehr. According to one account, the name was chosen personally by Adolf Hitler for propaganda reasons and means "assault rifle" as in "to assault an enemy position", although some sources dispute that Hitler had much to do with coining the new name besides signing the order. After the adoption of the StG 44, the English translation "assault rifle" became the accepted designation for this type of infantry small arm. Over the course of its production, there were minor changes to the butt end, muzzle nut, shape of the front sight base and stepping of the barrel.

The rifle was chambered for the 7.92×33mm Kurz cartridge. This shorter version of the German standard 7.92×57mm Mauser rifle round, in combination with the weapon's selective-fire design, provided a compromise between the controllable firepower of an MP-40 submachine gun at close quarters with the accuracy and power of a Karabiner 98k bolt-action rifle at intermediate ranges. While the StG 44 had less range and power than the more powerful infantry rifles of the day, the German military believed a maximum effective range of 400 m was optimal. Full-power rifle cartridges were excessive for most uses for the average soldier. Only a trained specialist, such as a sniper, or soldiers equipped with machine guns, which fired multiple rounds at a known or suspected target, could make full use of the standard rifle round's range and power.

== History ==
=== Background ===
In the late 19th century, small-arms cartridges had become able to fire accurately at long distances. Jacketed bullets propelled by smokeless powder were lethal out to 2,000 metres (2,200 yd). This was beyond the range a shooter could engage a target with open sights, as at that range a man-sized target would be completely blocked by the front sight blade; only units of riflemen firing by volley could hit grouped targets at those ranges. That fighting style was taken over by the widespread introduction of machine guns, which made use of these powerful cartridges to suppress the enemy at long range. Rifles remained the primary infantry weapon, but in some forces were seen as a secondary or support weapon, backing up the machine guns.

This practice left a large gap in performance: the rifle was not effective at the ranges it could theoretically reach while being much larger and more powerful than needed for close combat. Weapons for short-range use existed, initially semi-automatic pistols and, later, automatic submachine guns. These fired pistol rounds which lacked power, accuracy, and range. They were only useful at very short ranges of no more than 50–100 metres (160–330 ft). This led to extensive research into creating an intermediate round to fill this gap. This type of ammunition was being considered as early as 1892, but militaries at the time were still fixated on increasing the maximum range and velocity of bullets from their rifles.

=== Earlier development ===
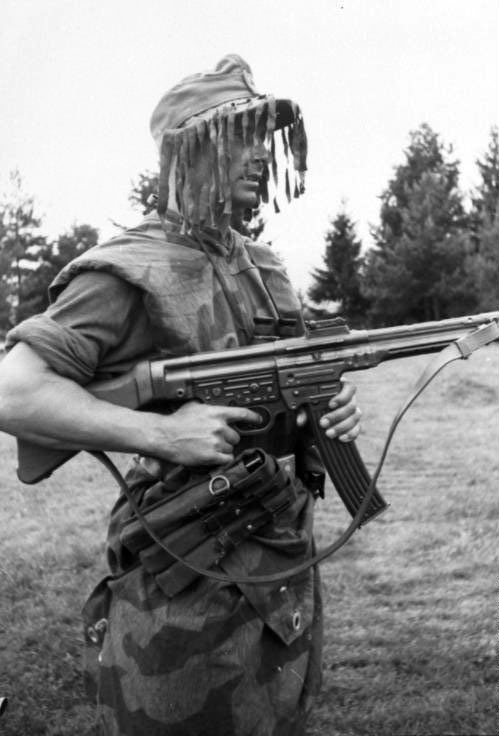
A German infantryman armed with an StG 44, wearing "splinter" camouflage and a ghillie cap in July 1944

In early 1918, Hauptmann Piderit, part of the Gewehrprüfungskommission ("Small Arms Examination Committee") of the German General Staff in Berlin, submitted a paper arguing for the introduction of an intermediate round in the German Army with a suitable firearm. He pointed out that firefights rarely took place beyond 800 metres (870 yd), about half the 2 km (1.2 mi) sight line range of the 7.92×57mm round from a Mauser Gewehr 98 rifle or less for MG 08 machine gun. A smaller, shorter, and less powerful round would save materials, allow soldiers to carry more ammunition, and increase firepower. Less recoil would allow semi-automatic or even fully automatic select-fire rifles, although in his paper he called it a Maschinenpistole (submachine gun). The German Army showed no interest, as it already had the MP 18 submachine gun firing 9 mm pistol rounds and did not want to create a new cartridge.

In 1923, the German Army set out requirements for a Gewehr 98 replacement. It had to be smaller and lighter than the Mauser, have similar performance out to 400 metres (440 yd), and have a magazine with a 20- or 30-round capacity. The Bavarian company Rheinisch-Westfälische Sprengstoff (RWS) experimented with rounds in the 1920s, and German companies developing intermediate ammunition for aerial machine guns showed interest. Development of the future infantry rifle did not start until the 1930s. RWS offered two rounds, one with a 7 mm bullet and one with an 8 mm bullet, both in a 46 mm case. The German company Deutsche Waffen und Munitionsfabriken had the 7×39.1mm round, and Gustav Genschow & Co (Geco) proposed a 7.75×39.5mm round. Geco's automatic carbine was the Model A35, a further development of the SG29 semi-automatic rifle. The weapon was complicated and unsafe to handle.

The German government started its own intermediate round and weapon program soon after. German ammunition maker Polte of Magdeburg was commissioned to develop the rounds in April 1938 and signed a contract with the Heereswaffenamt (HWA). At the same time, the HWA contracted C. G. Haenel of Suhl to create a weapon for the round. HWA requirements were for a rifle that was shorter and with equal or less weight to the Karabiner 98k and as accurate out to 400 metres (440 yd); and be select-fire with a rate of fire under 450 rounds per minute. It should be rifle grenade compatible, reliable, maintainable, and have a "straightforward design". Fifty rifles were to be delivered for field testing in early 1942.

At the start of World War II, German infantry were equipped with weapons comparable to those of most other military forces. A typical infantry unit was equipped with a mix of bolt-action rifles and some form of light, medium or general-purpose machine gun. A problem with this mix was that the standard rifles were too large to be effectively used by mechanized and armored forces, where they were difficult to maneuver in the cramped spaces of an armored vehicle. Submachine guns, such as the MP 28, MP 38, and MP 40 were issued to augment infantry rifle use and increase individual soldiers' firepower, but lacked range and accuracy beyond 100 metres (110 yd).

=== New requirements ===
During the invasion of the Soviet Union, increasing numbers of semi-automatic Tokarev SVT-38 and SVT-40s were used by the Red Army – mostly elite units and non-commissioned officers – while some Soviet rifle companies were completely equipped with PPSh-41 submachine guns.

After experiencing high volumes of automatic fire from these weapons, German commanders re-thought their small arms requirements. The German army had been attempting to introduce semi-automatic weapons such as the Gewehr 41, but these proved troublesome in service, and production was insufficient to meet requirements. Several attempts had been made to introduce lightweight machine guns or automatic rifles, but recoil from the powerful 7.92×57mm Mauser round was too difficult to control in automatic fire.

By 1941, it was becoming clear that action needed to be taken. Although various experimental rounds had been developed, the Army ultimately chose a new design, the Polte 8×33mm Kurzpatrone ("short cartridge"). It used a spitzer bullet and the basic cartridge design of the standard 7.92×57mm Mauser rifle cartridge, cutting down the cartridge from the original 7.92×57mm Mauser to 7.92×33mm Kurz. It was understood that this was not ideal, but it would minimize logistical problems.

==== Design influences ====
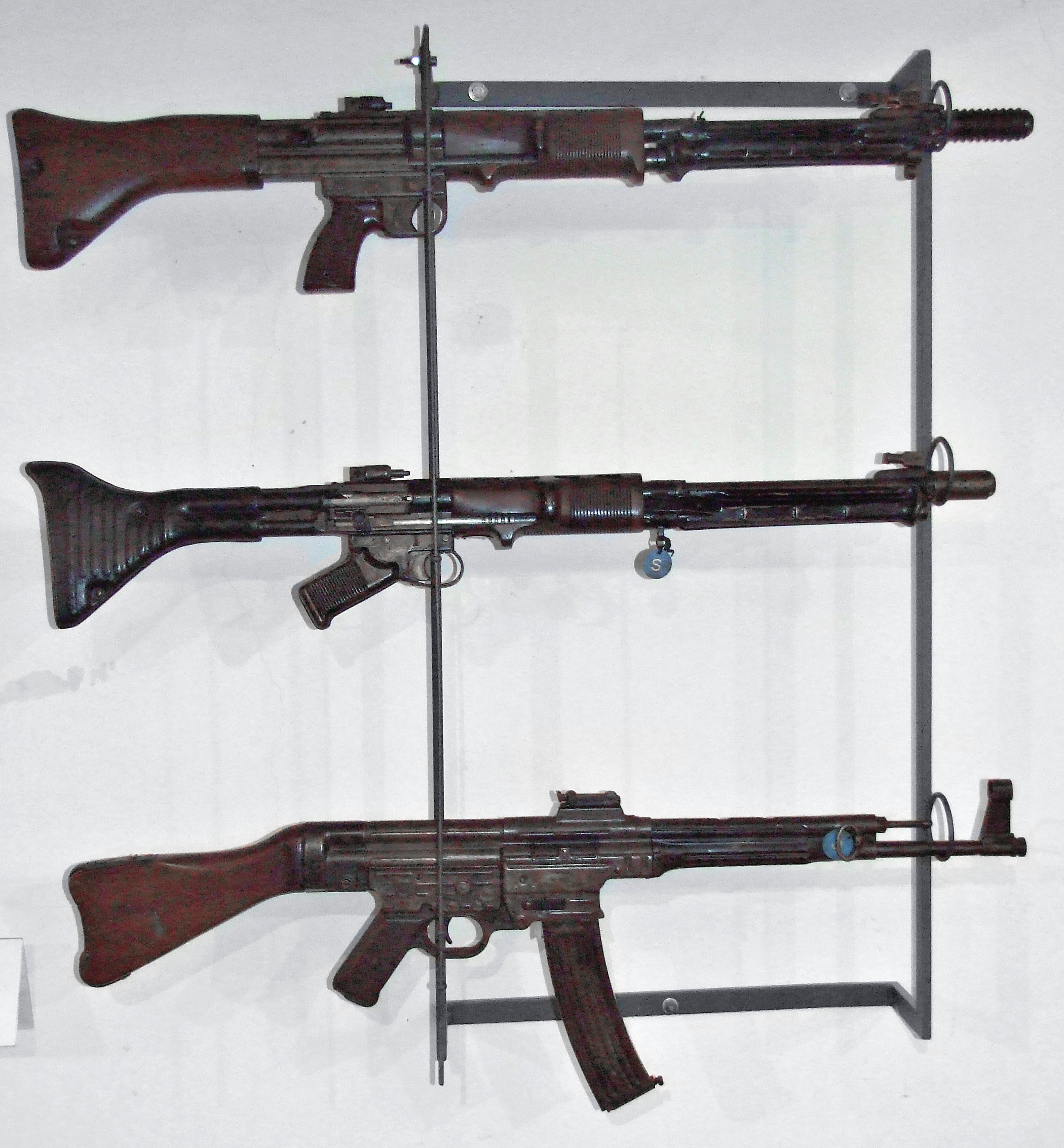
Top to bottom: late FG 42 and early FG 42 with their rear and front sights collapsed down and StG 44

The German 7.92×57mm Mauser chambered FG 42 battle rifle/automatic rifle was one of the first inline firearms incorporating a "straight-line" recoil configuration and an elevated sight line over the bore axis. The inline design helps reduce muzzle rise during automatic fire.

Details
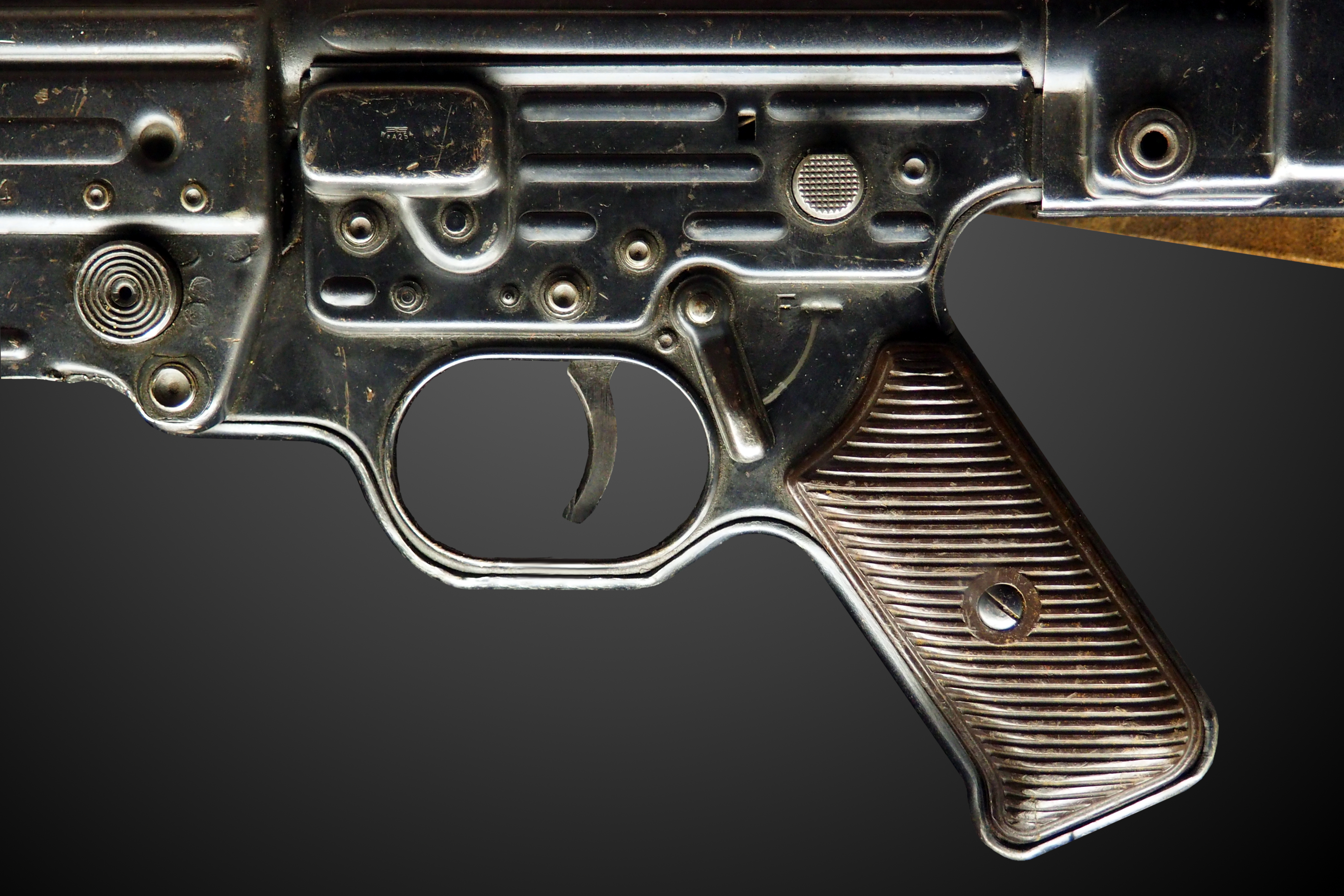
Handle assembly

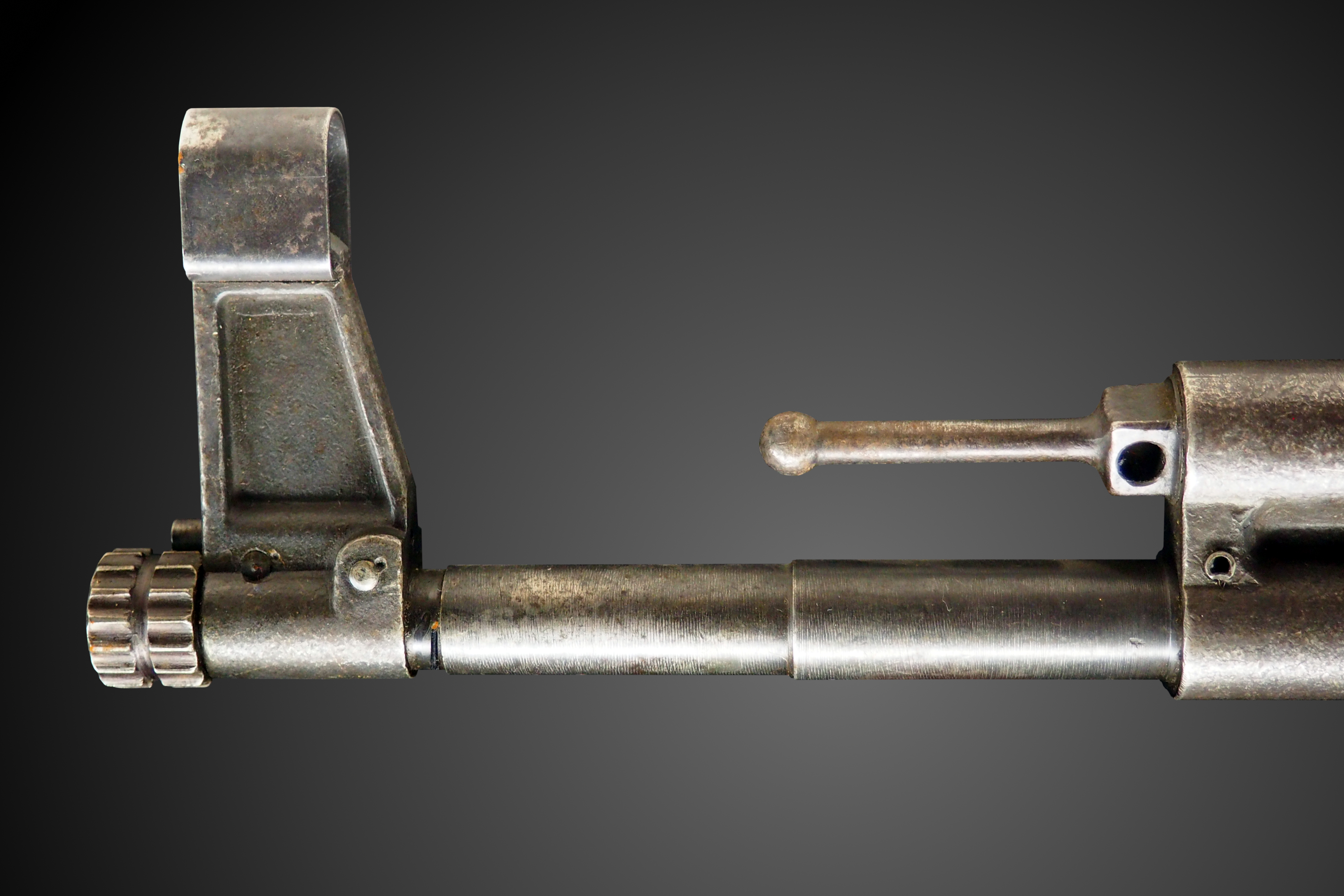
Muzzle assembly

=== MKb 42(H) & MKb 42(W) ===
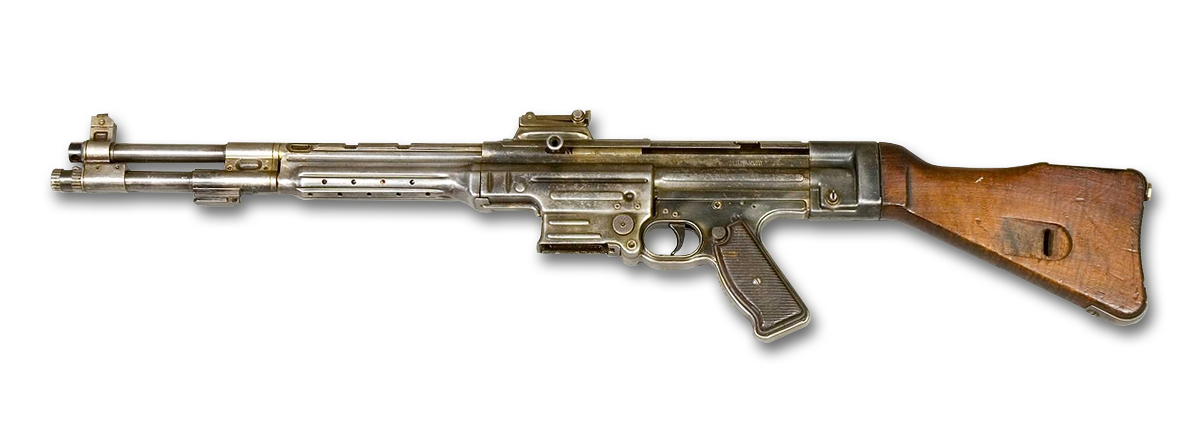
The early Haenel MKb 42(H)

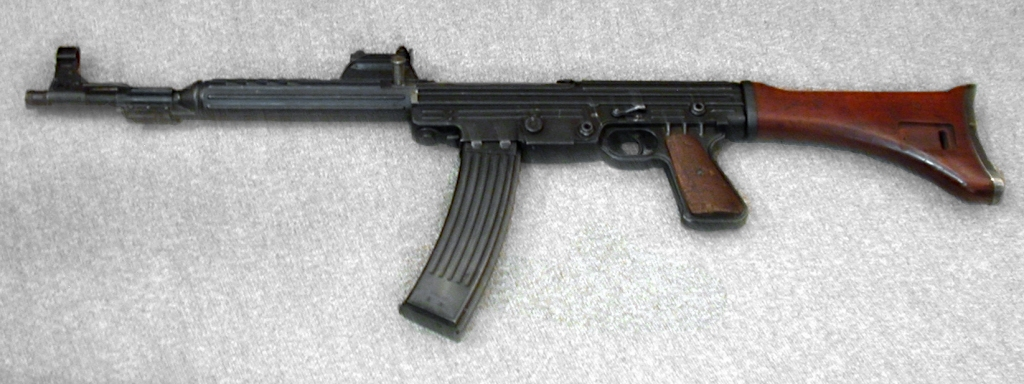
Walther MKb 42(W)

Contracts for rifles firing the 7.92×33mm Kurz round were issued to both Walther and Haenel (whose design group was headed by Hugo Schmeisser), were asked to submit prototype weapons under the name Maschinenkarabiner 1942 ("machine carbine") or MKb 42. Both designs were similar, using a gas-operated action, with selective fire. Since both rifles shared the title of Maschinenkarabiner 42 the letters (H) and (W) were added to differentiate the two. In this case (H) and (W) were the first initial of each guns manufacturer Haenel Waffen und Fahrradfabrik and Walther Waffenfabrik AG. The MKb 42(H) along with the less successful MKb 42(W) were predecessors of the later MP 43, MP 44, StG 44. The majority of the MP 43's features came from the MKb 42(H), with the hammer firing system and closed bolt coming from the MKb 42(W).

With time, Hitler became aware of the troop trials and ordered that all work on this new weapon be stopped immediately because of the new ammunition. (Note: Some of Hitler's criticisms included the need for long-range rifle fire in the North African theater and the existence of 8 billion rounds of 7.92×57mm Mauser (which could be fired from the Kar98k or Gewehr 41 rifles) in comparison to the experimental amounts of 7.92×33mm Kurz ammunition for the new machine carbines.) Nonetheless, production was allowed to continue, since the Gustloff company had been developing a machine carbine for normal rifle cartridges as a cover since July 1942. (Note: Gustloff presented three different models, but production would not be able to begin until late 1943 or early 1944. In comparison, the MP 43 could be readied for mass production by mid-1943.)

=== MP 43, MP 44, StG 44 ===
As work moved forward to incorporate this new firing system, Hitler demanded top priority for the production of FG 42 rifles, MP 40 submachine guns and telescopic sights for the Kar98k and Gewehr 41 rifles as well. To keep the MKb 42(H) development program alive, the Waffenamt (Armament Office) re-designated the weapon as the Maschinenpistole 43 (MP 43) ("Machine pistol 43") and, making a few improvements, billed the weapon as an upgrade to existing submachine guns, temporarily deceiving Hitler. (Note: While this change of designation allowed the development of the machine carbine program to continue, it also caused some confusion among some officials not aware of the true state of affairs (or who were opposed to it). They complained about the waste of time and resources on improving submachine guns, noting the limited effective range of pistol cartridges. Though it's not known how this ruse-induced situation was handled by the Minister of Armaments Albert Speer and his associates.) According to Hogg, little attention was paid on the MP 43 finish or close tolerances except when they were vital and the gun had to be considerably modified to allow production on simple stamping presses.

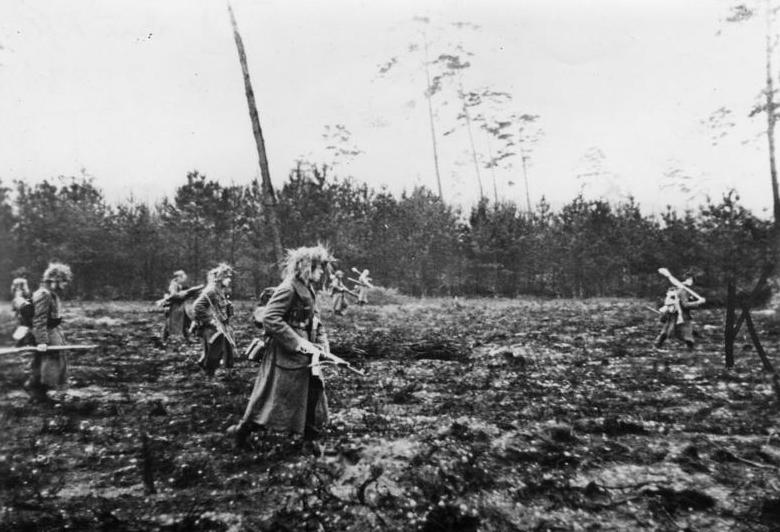
Grenadiers operating in the area of Aachen, Germany in December 1944

Much time was wasted trying to make the MP 43 a replacement for the Karabiner 98k rifle. This goal was eventually realized to be impossible; the MP 43 cartridge was too weak to fire rifle grenades, too inaccurate for sniping, and the weapon was too short for bayonet fighting. In September 1943, it was decided that the MP 43 would supplement rather than replace the Kar 98k. As a result, the optical sight base, grenade-launching extended muzzle thread, and bayonet lug were removed.

On 6 February 1943, an early production MP 43 (Note: Designed as the MP 43/1, it featured some components originally produced for the MKb 42(H), most noticeably the barrel was slightly longer than the ones used for the final design (412.875 mm vs. 412.75 mm or nominally 16.25 inches). The MP 43/1 uses the MKb 42(H) muzzle nut allowing attachments to be screwed on (including a grenade launcher), while the MP 43 had a different thread and nut arrangement to clamp-on a grenade launcher.) was presented to Hitler and Colonel Friedrich Kittel, with the former expressing his considerable annoyance at the change in designation. Shortly after this unveiling, Minister of Armaments Albert Speer sent a telegram from Hitler to the Waffenamt demanding the termination of the machine carbine project. Despite this, a limited production run continued. In the spring of 1943, small batches of the new weapon were used by troops in the Eastern front, with the Army Group North receiving 2,000 MKb 42(H) rifles on 21 April 1943. By the end of the year, it is estimated that a total of 29,500 MKb 42(H) and MP 43/1 rifles were produced in total, with slightly more than half being issued to troops in the field. Meanwhile, officers and other ranks in the Army were showing a growing interest in the machine carbine, with the guards at Hitler's headquarters enthusiastically expressing their approval upon receiving the new weapons. Presumably Hitler believed that these guns were already being assembled by the time he gave his order terminating MP 43 production.

Sometime in 1943, while Hitler was decorating three generals for outstanding service on the Eastern Front, he allowed each one to make a request (as was his custom on such ceremonial occasions). They all asked for the same thing: production and issue of the MP 43 for the troops. After further questioning, Hitler was surprised upon learning that limited numbers of the new rifle were already being used on the Eastern Front. He called for full reports from the Army and after reviewing them, Hitler changed his opinion on the MP 43, ordering the monthly production of 30,000 guns alongside the 7.92×33mm Kurz cartridge on 2 October 1943 (the day before, Chief of the Technical Department for Armament Production Karl Saur managed to convince Hitler of the merits of the new weapon). In November 1943, the Army ordered the issue of MP 43s for the troops in the Eastern Front, with the goal of having it as the standard weapon for more than a hundred divisions. Hitler would re-designate the weapon as the Maschinenpistole 44 (MP 44) in April 1944, while the production was given special priority by decree in August 1944.

Around 16−22 October 1944, the new rifle received its final designation, the Sturmgewehr 44 (StG 44) ("Assault rifle 44"). According to Johnston and Nelson, the term was coined by General Erich Jaschke and was accepted by Hitler and all parties associated with the assault rifle program. The final change of name was partly for propaganda purposes, and partly for technical reasons. The change of name was to differentiate the new rifle from the MP 38 and MP 40 submachine guns, both of which fired 9mm rounds, preventing any confusion over ammunition supply. It also more accurately described the weapon's role, delivering full-automatic fire at short range during the final assault on the enemy's lines.

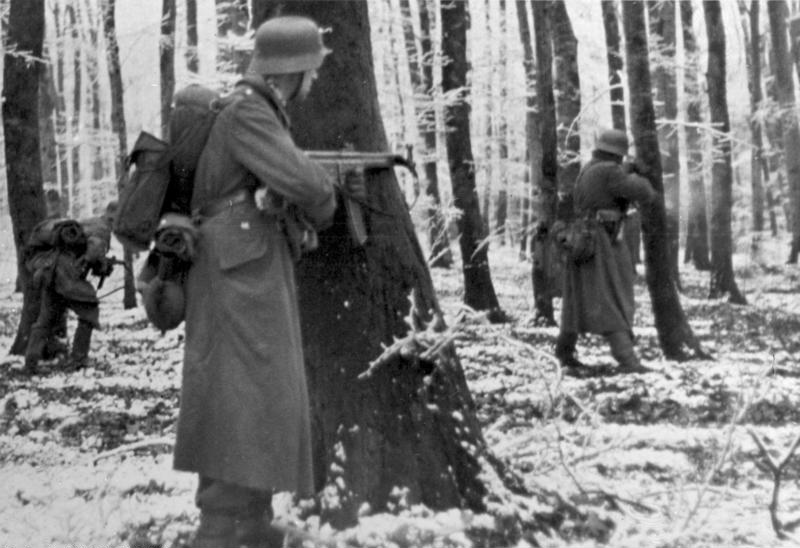
StG 44-equipped Volksgrenadiers fighting in the Ardennes, December 1944

Numerous reports and company correspondence reveal frequent presentation of the rifle's stages of development to Hitler. Rather than being opposed to the entire idea, his apprehension may have been from reluctance to send a new weapon to the front in too small numbers. Industry would not be able to replace some 12 million Kar 98k rifles in a short time, and the already strained logistics structure would have to support another cartridge. While the Sturmgewehr required specialized tooling to manufacture it, it consumed less materials and was faster and easier to make than a Kar 98k. Without suppliers to quickly produce components, companies could not manufacture sufficient numbers to replace the Kar 98k quickly. Introducing the new assault rifle in quantities that would not make an impression on the front would be counter-productive. Hitler instead may have wanted to introduce it on the largest scale possible.

Production soon began with the first batches of the new rifle being shipped to troops on the Eastern Front. By the end of the war, a total of 425,977 StG 44 variants of all types were produced and work had commenced on a follow-on rifle, the StG 45. The assault rifle proved a valuable weapon, especially on the Eastern front, where it was first deployed. A properly trained soldier with a StG 44 had an improved tactical repertoire, in that he could effectively engage targets at longer ranges than with an MP 40, but be much more useful than the Kar 98k in close combat, as well as provide covering fire like a light machine gun. It was also found to be exceptionally reliable in extreme cold. The StG 44's rate of fire was 540 rpm.

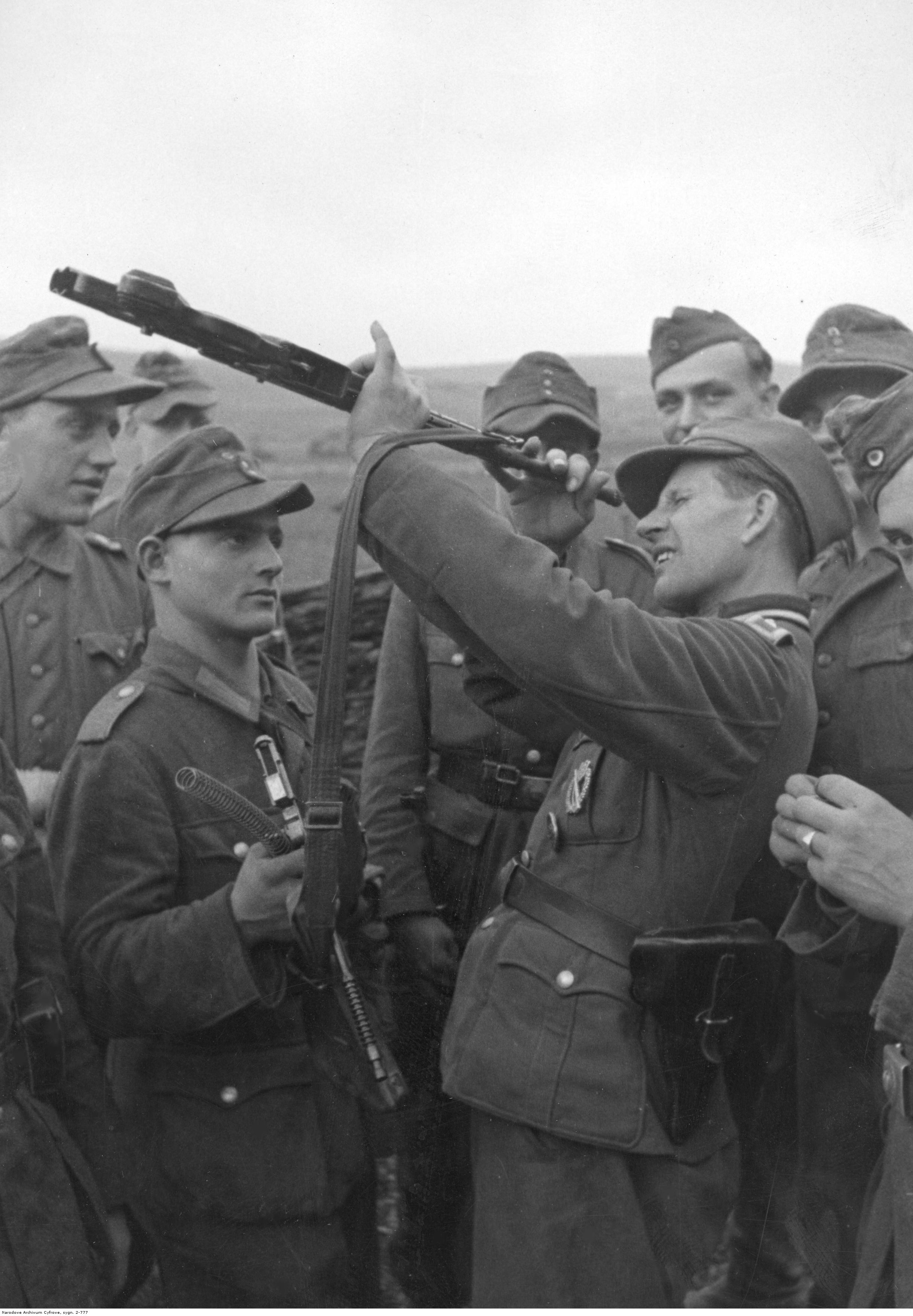
A gunsmith inspects an StG 44 rifle barrel. Galician front, 10 October 1944

A primary use of the MP 44/StG 44 was to counter the Soviet PPS and PPSh-41 submachine guns, which used the 7.62×25mm Tokarev round. These cheap, mass-produced weapons used a 71-round drum magazine or 35-round box magazine and though shorter-ranged than the Kar 98k rifle, were more effective weapons in close-quarter engagements. The StG 44, while lacking the range of the Kar 98k, had a considerably longer range than the PPS/PPSh submachine guns, more power, an ability to switch between a fully automatic and a default semi-automatic fire mode and surprising accuracy. The StG 44 was an intermediate weapon for the period; the muzzle velocity from its 419 mm (16.5 in) barrel was 685 m/s (2,247.4 ft/s), compared to 760 m/s (2,493 ft/s) of the Karabiner 98k, 744 m/s (2,440.9 ft/s) of the British Bren, 600 m/s (1,968.5 ft/s) of the M1 carbine, and 365 m/s (1,197.5 ft/s) achieved by the MP40. Furthermore, the StG 44's inline design gave it controllability even on full-auto.

The 1st Infantry Division of Army Group South and 32nd Infantry Division of Army Group North were selected to be issued the rifle, both being refitted from heavy losses on the Eastern Front; ammunition shortages meant the 1st ID was the only division fully equipped with it. The Kar 98k was retained as a specialist weapon for sniping and launching rifle grenades, while MP 40s were used by vehicle and artillery crews and officers. The StG 44 was issued to all infantry soldiers and employed for accurate short-range rapid-fire shooting (similar to how the MP 18 was used when it went into service). With the addition of StG 44's being issued to squads, the soldiers in a squad relied less on the machine gun for firepower, as now each individual infantry man could use the StG 44 to accurately hit and suppress targets, and generally provide automatic fire during combat. The magazine follower spring had a short service life, so soldiers were ordered to load no more than 25 rounds to reduce wear of the spring. While the StG 44 was capable of fully automatic fire, German soldiers were directed to use it primarily in semi-automatic mode. The doctrine was to use it in semi-automatic mode in order to prevent wastage of ammunition and spread firepower among several people at once instead of a single soldier emptying magazines. Fully automatic mode was to be used only in emergencies, for short bursts of two or three rounds.

Germany had ammunition logistics problems, thus Hitler's calculations came true in part: for the initially planned 200 million rounds per month, 86,000 additional workers were necessary, but were not available. The 400 million rounds per month planned from February 1944 onwards were completely utopian; from February 1945 the number was then reduced to a realistic 110 million.

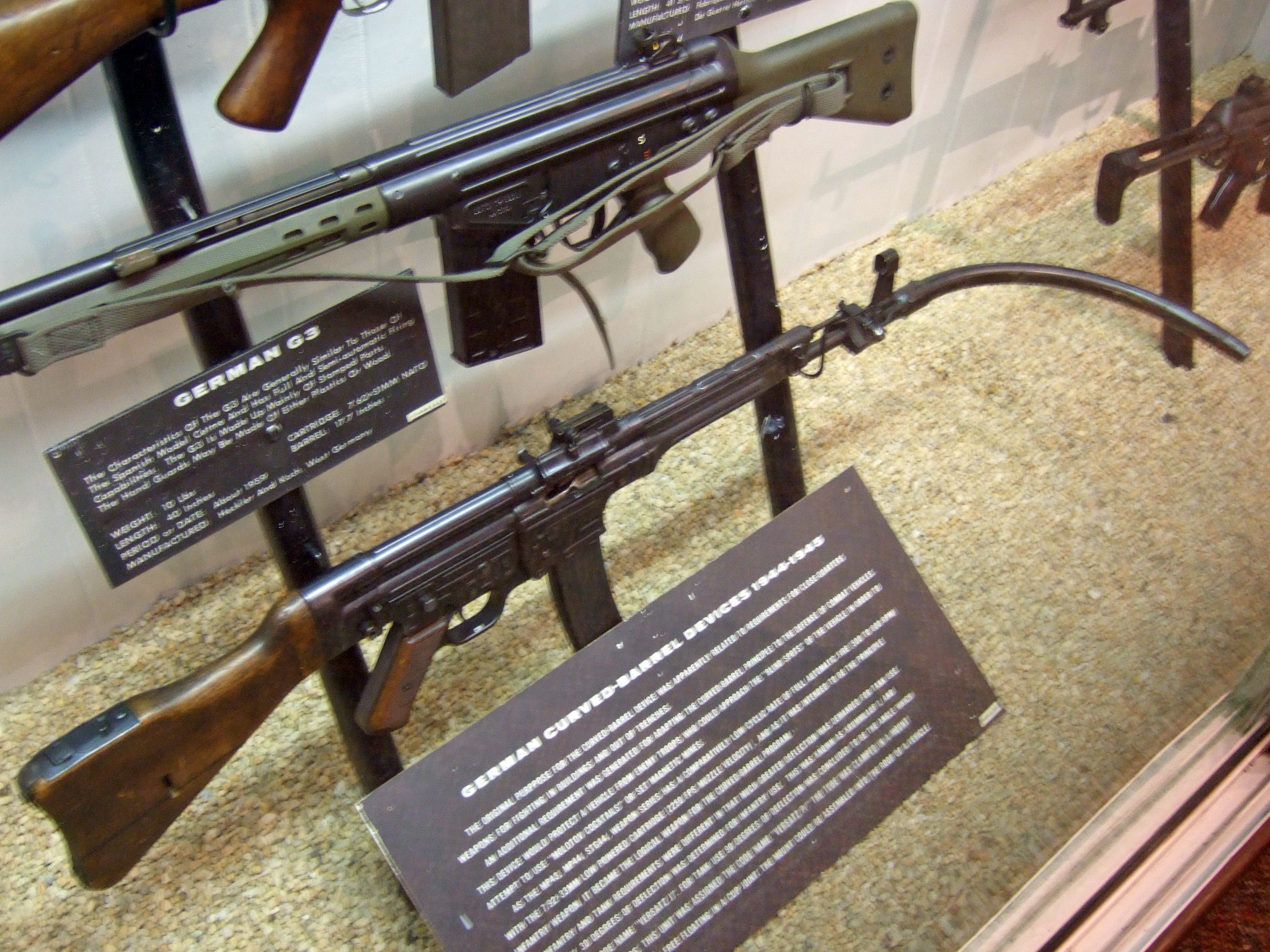
StG44 with Krummlauf bent barrel attachment

One unusual addition to the design was the Krummlauf; a bent barrel attachment for rifles with a periscope sighting device for shooting around corners from a safe position. It was produced in several variants: an "I" version for infantry use, a "P" version for use in tanks (to cover the dead areas in the close range around the tank, to defend against assaulting infantry), versions with 30°, 45°, 60° and 90° bends, a version for the StG 44 and one for the MG 42. Only the 30° "I" version for the StG 44 was produced in any numbers. The bent barrel attachments had very short lifespans – approx. 300 rounds for the 30° version, and 160 rounds for the 45° variant. The 30° model was able to achieve a 35×35 cm grouping at 100 m.

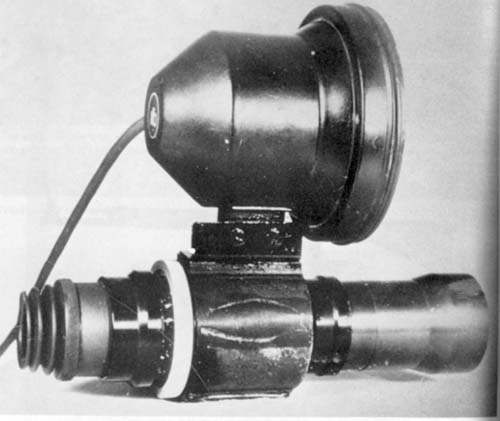
Zielgerät 1229 infra-red aiming device, also known by its codename Vampir ("vampire")

Some StG 44s were fitted with the Zielgerät 1229 infra-red aiming device, also known by its codename Vampir ("vampire"). This device consisted of a large scope, rather like modern starlight scopes, and a large infra-red lamp on top, the scope being able to pick up the infra-red that would be invisible to the naked eye. The user had to carry a transformer backpack powered by a battery fitted inside the gas mask canister. Electric cables connected the power unit with the IR reflector, with the cathode ray tube mounted on the rifle imaging IR from the spotlight. The Vampir had only 15 minutes of battery life, but was able to sight within 200 meters in total darkness. A conical flash hider was added to the barrel to keep the muzzle flash from blinding the shooter.

At the end of the war, Hugo Schmeisser claimed that 424,000 MP 43/MP 44/StG 44 rifles were built between June 1943 and April 1945 in four plants: 185,000 by C.G. Haenel in Suhl; 55,000 by J.P. Sauer & Sohn in Suhl; 104,000 in Erfurt; and 80,000 by Steyr-Daimler-Puch AG in Steyr, Austria. This was fewer than the 1.5 million ordered, and far fewer than the 4 million planned.

Some 822 million rounds of 7.92×33mm Kurz ammunition were produced from 1942 to 1945. At the beginning of March 1945, the troops had 273.9 million rounds, with a replenishment reserve of 69.6 million rounds on standby.

=== Late prototypes ===
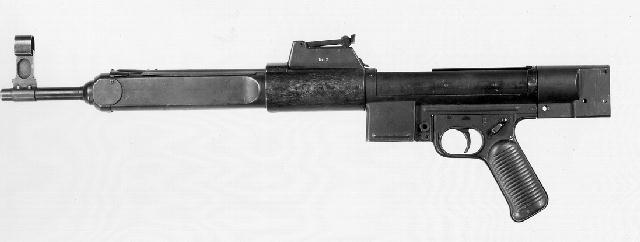
The Gerät 06 ("device 06") prototype. An attempt to further simplify the MP 43/44 and StG 44 series of weapons. The pictured example is incomplete; it was captured in 1945 and evaluated at Aberdeen Proving Ground after the war.

In a somewhat unrelated development, Mauser continued design work on a series of experimental weapons in an effort to produce an acceptable service-wide rifle for the short cartridge system. One of these prototypes, a product of the engineers at the Light Weapon Development Group (Abteilung 37) at Oberndorf, was the MKb Gerät 06 (Maschinenkarabiner Gerät 06 or "machine carbine device 06") first appearing in 1942. This gun used a unique gas piston-delayed roller-locked action derived from the short recoil operation of the MG 42 machine gun but with a fixed barrel and gas system. It was realized that with careful attention to the mechanical ratios, the gas system could be omitted. The resultant weapon, the Gerät 06(H), was supposedly slated for adoption by the Wehrmacht as the StG 45(M). The operating principle lived on in postwar designs from CEAM/AME, CETME, and most famously, Heckler & Koch.

Towards the end of the war, there were last-ditch efforts to develop cheap so-called Volksgewehr rifles in the 7.92×33mm caliber. One of these, the Gustloff Volkssturmgewehr, used a gas-delayed blowback action based on the Barnitzke system, whereby gas bled from the barrel near the chamber created resistance to the rearward impulse of the operating parts, which ceases when the projectile leaves the muzzle, allowing the operating parts to be forced rearward by the residual pressure of the cartridge case. This principle has been used most successfully in the P7 pistol.

=== Post-1945 ===
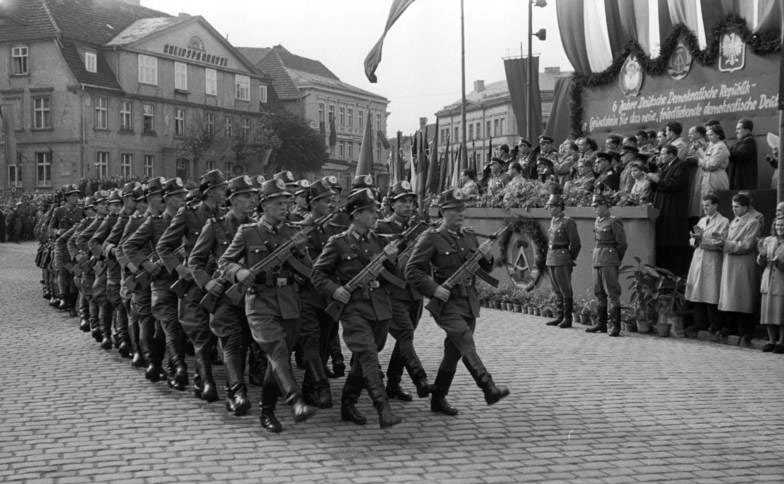
Officers of the East German Volkspolizei parading through the streets of Neustrelitz in 1955. The StG 44 remained in service with the organization until the early 1960s.

The Sturmgewehr remained in use with the East German Nationale Volksarmee with the designation MPi.44 until it was eventually replaced with domestic variants of the AK-47 assault rifle. The Volkspolizei used it until approximately 1962 when it was replaced by the PPSh-41. It was still used by other public security formations thereafter. The ammunition was manufactured there at least until 1961. Other countries to use the StG 44 after World War II included Czechoslovakia (although it was not officially adopted) and Yugoslavia, where units such as the 63rd Paratroop Battalion were equipped with it until the 1980s, when the rifles were ultimately transferred to Territorial Defense reserves or sold to friendly regimes in the Middle East and Africa. France adopted captured StG 44 for colonial Foreign Legion units.

Argentina manufactured their own trial versions of the StG 44 made by CITEFA in the late 1940s and early 1950s, in addition to the importation of around 100 StG 44 rifles from Czechoslovakia in 1949, whose whereabouts became unclear from 1955 onwards, but instead adopted the FN FAL in 1955, because it used the then more common and powerful 7.62×51mm NATO round, which also lacked connections with the Third Reich.

New semi-automatic civilian reproductions of the MKb 42(H), MP 43/1, and StG 44 are being manufactured in Germany today by SSD (Sport Systeme Dittrich) and distributed by HZA Kulmbach GmbH in the original 7.92×33mm Kurz chambering and accepting the standard magazines. The PTR-44 by PTR Industries was produced for a short while, but was soon discontinued due to high prices and lack of demand. A .22 rimfire copy of the StG 44 by GSG (German Sports Guns) has also been manufactured in great quantity for a lower price, but it is the only widely available reproduction of the StG. Talks have been made by HMG (Hill & Mac Gunworks) to mass-produce a StG-44 replica in different calibers, including the original 7.92×33mm Kurz, but also more modern calibers, like 7.62×39mm, 5.56×45mm NATO and .300 AAC Blackout, but these have yet to be released.

7.92mm Kurz ammunition is currently manufactured by Prvi Partizan of Serbia.

=== Assessment of the StG 44 ===
A late-war U.S. assessment derided the StG 44 as "mediocre", "bulky", and "unhandy", declaring it incapable of sustained automatic fire and prone to jamming, though the report accepted that its accuracy was "excellent for a weapon of its type". Its extensive use of stamped parts was noted to both greatly reduce manufacturing time of production and reduce its cost, though the use of thin metal stampings meant that certain parts could easily be dented and render the gun unserviceable. The general use of rivets in assembly limited repairs in the field.

According to British Captain Clifford Shore in With British Snipers to the Reich, the British found the StG 44 to be poorly made compared to the weapons fielded by the Germans early in World War II.

Military historian Ian V. Hogg described the StG 44 as "exceptionally robust and reliable," with a German report stating that it worked well in the dirt, cold and snow of the Eastern Front, had no misfires and was resistant to stoppages.

== Legacy ==
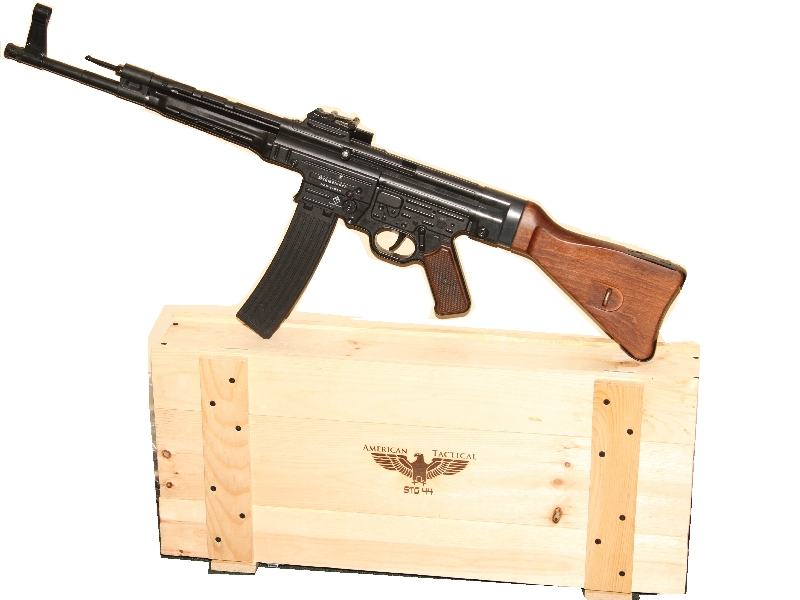
A .22 rimfire copy of the StG 44 by German Sports Guns (GSG)

The StG 44 was the first assault rifle to be accepted into widespread service and put into mass production. "The principle of this weapon – the reduction of muzzle impulse to get useful automatic fire within actual ranges of combat – was probably the most important advance in small arms since the invention of smokeless powder." The StG 44's effect on post-war arms design was wide-ranging, as made evident by Mikhail Kalashnikov's AK-47, and later Eugene Stoner's M16 and its variants. The Soviet Union was quick to adopt the assault rifle concept. The AK-47 used a similar-sized intermediate round and followed the design concept, but utilized a rotating bolt as a part of its firing action. In 1944 the US added an automatic fire capability to the M1 carbine, and issued it as the M2 carbine with 30 round magazines, fulfilling much the same function. Kits were distributed to convert M1 carbines to M2s.

The extent to which the Sturmgewehr influenced the development of the AK-47 is not clearly known. Apart from external layout similarity and the gas-operation principle, the AK-47 was not a copy of the German gun because the AK-47 used a very different mechanism. However, tens of thousands of Sturmgewehrs were captured by the Soviets and some were more than likely provided to Kalashnikov and his team. In addition, Hugo Schmeisser was put to work by the Soviets at the Izhmash factory (factory number 74) in Izhevsk until 1952. The 7.62×39 mm cartridge, however, was verifiably influenced by the 7.92×33 mm cartridge used in the StG 44. In July 1943, the Soviet Technical Council of the People's Commissariat for Armament (NKV) met to consider new foreign weapons firing lower-powered rounds. Two rounds that were studied were the American .30 Carbine and German 7.92 Kurz, captured from MKb 42(H) rifles undergoing troop trials. The meeting concluded that the 7.92 mm cartridge was an important development and that the Soviets needed to design a reduced-power round. The first prototype 7.62 mm M1943 round was created a month later and used the 7.92 Kurz design method of using the same caliber bullet as their standard rifle round (7.62×54mmR) in a shorter case.

After World War II, many Western countries continued using their existing full-caliber rifles. Although the 7.62×51mm NATO round adopted post-war was still a full-power cartridge, the trend towards the adoption of less powerful rounds was already under way in the West. For example, the M1 Garand had initially been developed for the .276 Pedersen (7 mm) round, a cartridge less powerful than the standard .30-06 Springfield. The U.S. Army's adoption of the M1 carbine in 1941 proved the utility of a small, handy, low-powered rifle that required little training to use effectively. Franchi of Italy-based the actions of both the LF-58 carbine and the LF-59 battle rifle on the StG-44.

United States and, later, NATO developed assault rifles along a roughly similar path by at first adding selective-fire capability in a reduced power, full-caliber cartridge. The Soviet Union lightened the AK-47 and introduced the AKM. The U.S. developed the concept of small-caliber, high-velocity (SCHV) bullets and further reduced the weight of their firearms with the introduction of the M16 (5.56 mm). The Soviet armed forces followed suit with the introduction of the SCHV AK-74 rifle (5.45 mm).

== Users ==
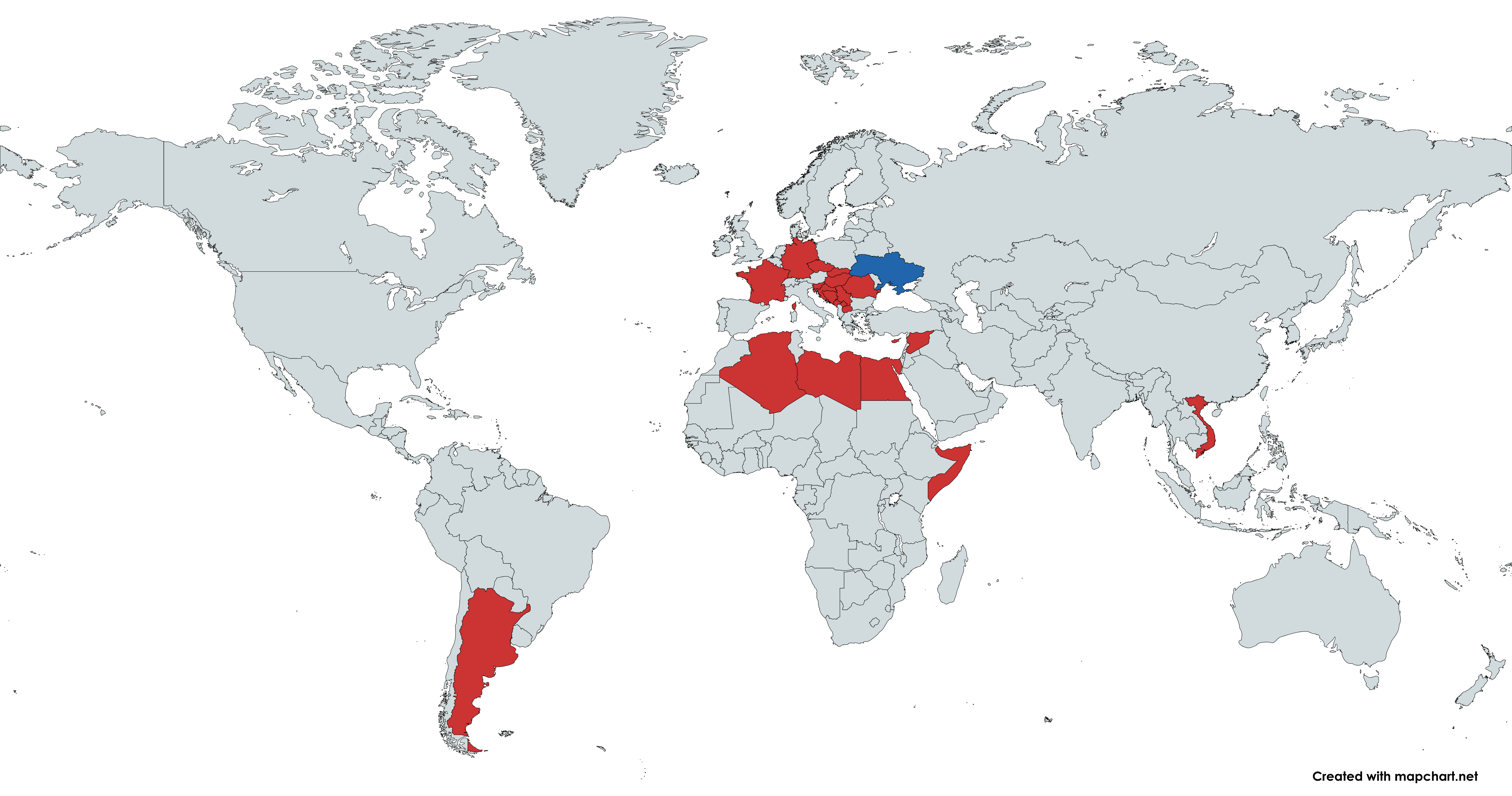
World map of StG 44 users Current Former

=== Current users ===
- Ukraine: Used by Ukrainian militias during the war in Donbas and by guards at the Mezhyhirya museum.

=== Former users ===
- Algeria
- Argentina (three built for trial purposes only and a hundred purchased from Czechoslovakia in 1949)
- Cyprus
- Czechoslovakia
- Egypt: A small amount of StG 44s were received from Czechoslovakia during the Six Day War; the rifles were kept in storage and never used
- France
- Nazi Germany
- East Germany
- Hungary
- Libya: Small amounts were purchased from Yugoslavia in 1983 and kept in storage
- Romania
- Soviet partisans (captured)
- North Vietnam
- Yugoslavia
- Somalia Surplus WW2 weapons from East Germany
- Ba'athist Syria – Originally sold to the Syrian Arab Army by East Germany in the early 1960s, the weapons were stored for decades until reappearing during the Syrian civil war. During the war, which began in 2011 and lasted for more than thirteen years, a large number ultimately fell into the hands of various rebel and insurgent organizations.
- Syrian National Coalition for Revolutionary and Opposition Forces

=== Non-state groups ===
Captured StG 44 were used by Polish partisan groups during World War II, including during the Warsaw Uprising in 1944, although they were not a commonly captured weapon. Relatively large numbers of StG 44 were used post-war by Polish anti-communist resistance groups until the 1950s.

After World War II, the Soviet Union and other Eastern Bloc states supplied allied regimes and guerrilla movements with captured German arms, such as the StG 44, along with newly manufactured or repackaged 7.92×33mm ammunition. French forces discovered many in Algeria and determined the origin to be from Czechoslovakia. Examples also found their way into the hands of the Viet Cong during the Vietnam War, and the PLO. StG44s were used by the WSLF and FLCS insurgents in Somalia.

It is still used in very limited numbers by militia and insurgent forces in the Middle East.

In August 2012, the Syrian Al-Tawhid Brigade posted a video clip on their YouTube channel showing a cache of StG 44s in their possession. They claimed to have captured 5,000 StG 44 rifles and ammunition from a weapons depot in the city of Aleppo. Photos later surfaced of the rebels using them in combat. In September 2013, a photo showed a Syrian rebel with a Sturmgewehr 44 connected to a makeshift remote weapon station. The gun was controlled by a wired joystick, vision was provided by a video camera mounted behind a scope, and the picture was displayed on an LCD screen.

In 2013 a small number of StG44 rifles were seized from rebels in Burkina Faso, it is thought that they were looted from government depots during the Libyan Civil War and later sold in the black market.

== See also ==
- List of 7.92×33mm Kurz firearms
- List of assault rifles
- Calzada Bayo CB-57 – Spanish battle rifle prototype
- Cei-Rigotti – Italian selective-fire automatic rifle
- EPK (Pyrkal) machine gun – Greek assault rifle
- Fedorov Avtomat – Soviet battle rifle
- HIW VSK – German prototype carbine and battle rfile
- Vollmer M35 – Series of German experimental automatic rifles
- Wimmersperg Spz – Family of German assault rifles

== Bibliography ==
- Hogg, Ian V. (1977). The Encyclopedia of Infantry Weapons of World War II. New York, NY: Crowell. ISBN 978-0-690-01447-1.
- Johnston, Gary Paul; Nelson, Thomas B. (2016). The World's Assault Rifles. Ironside International Publishers Inc. ISBN 978-1-61984-601-2.
- McNab, Chris (2013). German Automatic Rifles 1941–45: Gew 41, Gew 43, FG 42 and StG 44. Bloomsbury Publishing. ISBN 978-1-78096-387-7.
- Rottman, Gordon L. (2013). The Big Book of Gun Trivia: Everything you want to know, don't want to know, and don't know you need to know. Bloomsbury Publishing. ISBN 978-1-78200-949-8.
