= Maschinenkarabiner 42(H) =

German assault rifle

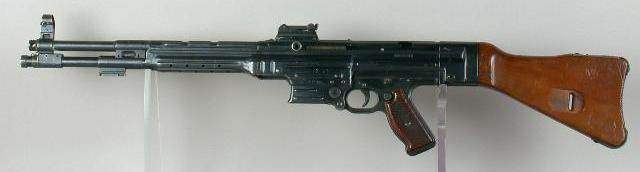
- Haenel-built MKb 42(H)
- Type: Assault rifle
- Place of origin: Germany

Service history
- In service: 1942 – 1945
- Used by: Wehrmacht

Production history
- Designer: Hugo Schmeisser
- Designed: 1940 – 1941
- Manufacturer: C. G. Haenel Waffen und Fahrradfabrik
- Produced: 1941 – 1942 (Prototypes); January 1943 – September 1943 (Serial production)
- No. built: 8,000 – 11,813

Specifications
- Mass: 4.9 kg (10 lb 13 oz) empty 5.49 kg (12 lb 2 oz) empty with bayonet
- Length: 940 mm (3 ft 1 in); 1,158 mm (3 ft 9.6 in) with bayonet
- Barrel length: 364 mm (1 ft 2 in)
- Cartridge: 7.92×33mm Kurz
- Action: Gas-operated, tilting bolt, selective-fire
- Rate of fire: 500 rpm
- Muzzle velocity: 640 m/s (2,100 ft/s)
- Effective firing range: 600 m (660 yd) single fire 300 m (330 yd) burst 200 m (220 yd) continuous
- Maximum firing range: 800 m (870 yd) sighted
- Feed system: 30 round detachable box magazine
- Sights: Adjustable iron sights, rear: V-notch; front: hooded post

The Maschinenkarabiner 42(H) or MKb 42(H) (Machine carbine model of 1942 (Haenel)) is an early German World War II assault rifle firing an intermediate round. Designed in 1940 – 1941 by Hugo Schmeisser working for C. G. Haenel Waffen und Fahrradfabrik, several thousand were made and the gun was used on the Eastern Front in 1943.

The MKb 42(H), along with the less successful Maschinenkarabiner 42(W) (MKb 42(W)) by Walther Waffenfabrik AG, were predecessors of the Sturmgewehr assault rifle.

== History ==
As early as 1918 the German Army (Heer) began to study the feasibility of an intermediate round and rifle. However, a combination of military orthodoxy, limited funds and the arms development restrictions of the Versailles Treaty led Germany to adopt the Mauser Karabiner 98K on 21 June 1935 to replace the Gewehr 98. From 1939 onwards the German Army gathered combat reports which were analyzed to determine combat conditions and tactical trends in order to develop new tactics and equipment requirements. One of the lessons which re-emerged was the existing 7.92 Mauser rifle cartridge was more powerful and longer ranged than what was needed. Since most combat took place at ranges less than 400 m (440 yd) a less powerful round could be used, which would mean a soldier could carry more ammunition, the weapon could be shorter, lighter and—with less recoil—the gun could be an automatic. Submachine guns had existed since the First World War, but they used pistol-caliber ammunition and lacked both the range and accuracy the German Army was looking for. A new intermediate cartridge was needed and the 7.92×33mm Kurz was designed in response to this requirement. The specification called for a new weapon which was larger than a submachine gun, more accurate, longer ranged and more maneuverable than a full sized rifle.

Contracts for weapons firing the 7.92×33mm Kurz round were issued to both Haenel and Walther, who were asked to submit prototype weapons under the name Machinenkarabiner 1942. The (H) and (W) in their titles referred to the first initial of each guns manufacturer, Haenel and Walther, to differentiate the two. In December 1940, a prototype rifle from Haenel and Walther was tested by the Heereswaffenamt at Kummersdorf. It had multiple jams, several barrels bulged, and one had a catastrophic failure. Testers blamed the results on poor quality ammunition. In February 1942, 10 million 7.92x33 mm Kurz rounds were ordered for field testing. On 9 July 1942, field and comparative tests were conducted with the ammunition and the MKb 42(H) rifle; 3,654 shots were fired; 11 cases were separated, 67 rounds were duds (56 fired on second trial), and many other rounds stovepipe jammed. Failures were blamed on the weapon still only being at the prototype stage of the development process.

== Design ==
The original prototype fired from an open bolt and used a striker for firing. The receiver and trigger housing with pistol grip were made from steel stampings, which were attached to the barrel assembly on a hinge, allowing the weapon to be folded open for quick disassembly and cleaning. The Haenel design proved superior to Walther's MKb 42(W), and the army then asked Haenel for another version incorporating a list of minor changes designated MKb 42(H). One was to include lugs for mounting a standard bayonet, another was to change the pitch of the rifling.

A production run of these modified versions was sent to the field in November 1942, and the users appreciated it with a few reservations. Another set of modifications added a hinged cover over the ejection port to keep it clean in combat, and rails to mount a telescopic sight.

Ultimately, it was recommended that a hammer firing system operating from a closed bolt similar to Walther's design be incorporated into the MK 42 design. The gas expansion chamber over the barrel was deemed unnecessary and was removed from successive designs, as was the under barrel bayonet lug. In order to circumvent a ban on development in favour of submachine guns, the modified design was given the designation Maschinenpistole 43 (MP43). After further development was permitted the design eventually emerged as the StG 44.

== Service ==
The MKb 42(H) was mostly used on the Eastern Front against the Soviet forces. By one account, the gun saw action as early as April 1942 when 35 of the only 50 prototypes then in existence were parachuted into the Kholm Pocket near Leningrad as part of a resupply of the defenders.

By March 1943, 2,734 MKb 42(H) were accepted into service, followed by 2,179 in April alone and 3,044 in May; these numbers correlate well with the Haenel estimates for these months (2,000 and respectively 3,000). Additionally, Haenel estimated that 3,000 were made in June and 1,000 in July, resulting in an upper estimate of 12,000 units for the MKb 42(H). However, the Haenel production figures from June 1943 onward do not differentiate between the last batches of MKb 42(H) and the first batches of MP 43/1. Other sources seem to accept only the more conservative estimate of 8,000 units.

== See also ==
- Sudayev AS-44
- Kalashnikov AK-47
- List of 7.92×33mm Kurz firearms
- List of assault rifles
