= 7.92×33mm Kurz =

German firearm cartridge developed for the StG 44 rifle

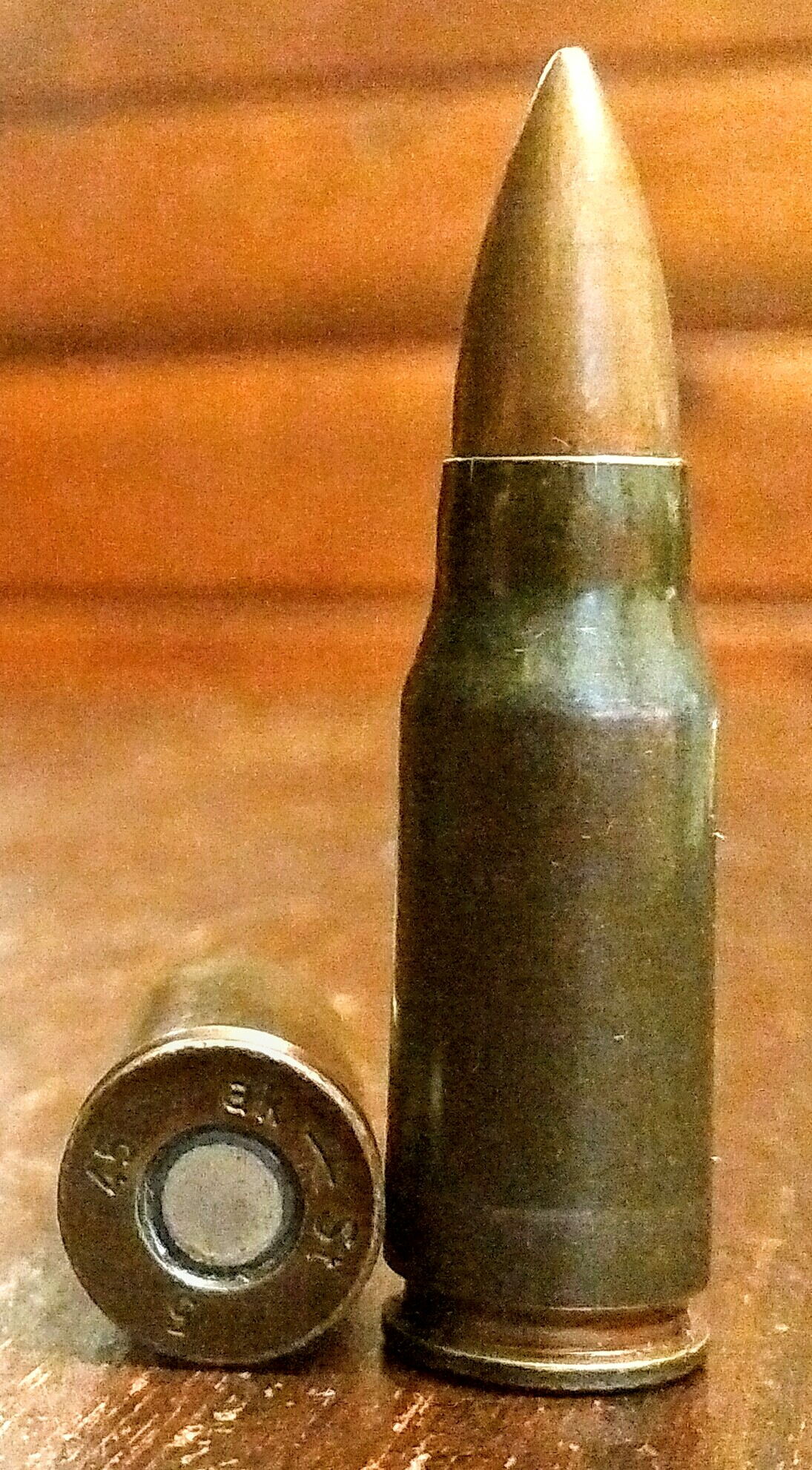
- German 7.92×33mm Kurz m.E. — mild steel cored projectile round
- Type: Rifle
- Place of origin: Germany

Service history
- In service: 1942–1945 (Wehrmacht service); 1945-present (others)
- Wars: World War II; First Indochina War; Algerian War; Lebanese Civil War; Vietnam War; Ogaden War; Iraq War; Syrian Civil War; Russo-Ukrainian War

Production history
- Designer: Polte ammunition works, Magdeburg
- Designed: 1938
- No. built: 822,000,000 (1942–1945)

Specifications
- Parent case: 7.92×57mm
- Case type: Rimless, bottleneck
- Bullet diameter: 8.22 mm (0.324 in)
- Land diameter: 7.89 mm (0.311 in)
- Neck diameter: 9.10 mm (0.358 in)
- Shoulder diameter: 11.40 mm (0.449 in)
- Base diameter: 11.94 mm (0.470 in)
- Rim diameter: 11.95 mm (0.470 in)
- Rim thickness: 1.30 mm (0.051 in)
- Case length: 33.00 mm (1.299 in)
- Overall length: 48.00 mm (1.890 in)
- Case capacity: 2.22 cm^{3} (34.3 gr H_{2}O)
- Rifling twist: 240 mm (1 in 9.45 inch)
- Primer type: Berdan
- Maximum pressure (C.I.P.): 340.00 MPa (49,313 psi)

Ballistic performance
Bullet mass/type	Velocity	Energy
8.0 g (123 gr) FMJBT	685 m/s (2,250 ft/s)	1,886 J (1,391 ft⋅lbf)
8.1 g (125 gr) Ball	685 m/s (2,250 ft/s)	1,909 J (1,408 ft⋅lbf)
- Test barrel length: 419 mm (16.5 inches); Source: "Cartridges of the World"

The 7.92×33mm Kurz (“short” in German) (designated as the 7.92 x 33 kurz by the C.I.P.) is a rimless bottlenecked intermediate rifle cartridge (German: Mittelpatrone) developed in Nazi Germany prior to and during World War II, specifically intended for development of the Sturmgewehr 44 (assault rifle). The ammunition is also referred to as 7.9mm Kurz (German: Kurz meaning "short"), 7.9 Kurz, 7.9mmK, or 8×33 Polte. The round was developed as a compromise between the longer 7.92×57mm full-power rifle cartridge and the 9×19mm Parabellum pistol cartridge.

== Cartridge dimensions ==
The 7.92×33mm Kurz has a 2.22 ml (34.3 grain H_{2}O) cartridge case capacity.

7.92×33mm Kurz maximum C.I.P. cartridge dimensions. All sizes in millimeters (mm).

Americans define the shoulder angle at alpha/2 ≈ 17.5 degrees. The common rifling twist rate for this cartridge is 240 mm (1 in 9.45 in), four grooves, Ø lands = 7.89 millimetres (0.311 in), Ø grooves = 8.20 millimetres (0.323 in), land width = 4.40 millimetres (0.173 in) and the primer type is Berdan or boxer (in large rifle size).

According to the official Commission Internationale Permanente pour l'Epreuve des Armes à Feu Portatives (C.I.P.) rulings, the 7.92×33mm Kurz can handle up to 340.00 MPa (49,313 psi) P_{max} piezo pressure. In C.I.P. regulated countries every rifle-cartridge combination has to be proofed at 125% of this maximum C.I.P. pressure to certify for sale to consumers.

== Military designation ==
In German military instructions, the caliber was often deemed unimportant; the name was emphasized. The 7.92×33mm Kurz was referred to as the Pistolenpatrone M43 (pistol cartridge model 1943) or Pistolen-Munition M43 (pistol ammunition model 1943). This was part of the same duplicity under which the StG44 was originally designated as a "machine pistol" to disguise the true nature of the weapon from Hitler. After the eventual approval and acceptance of the Sturmgewehr 44, it was redesignated as the "short cartridge model 1943" (German: Kurzpatrone 43).

== Background ==
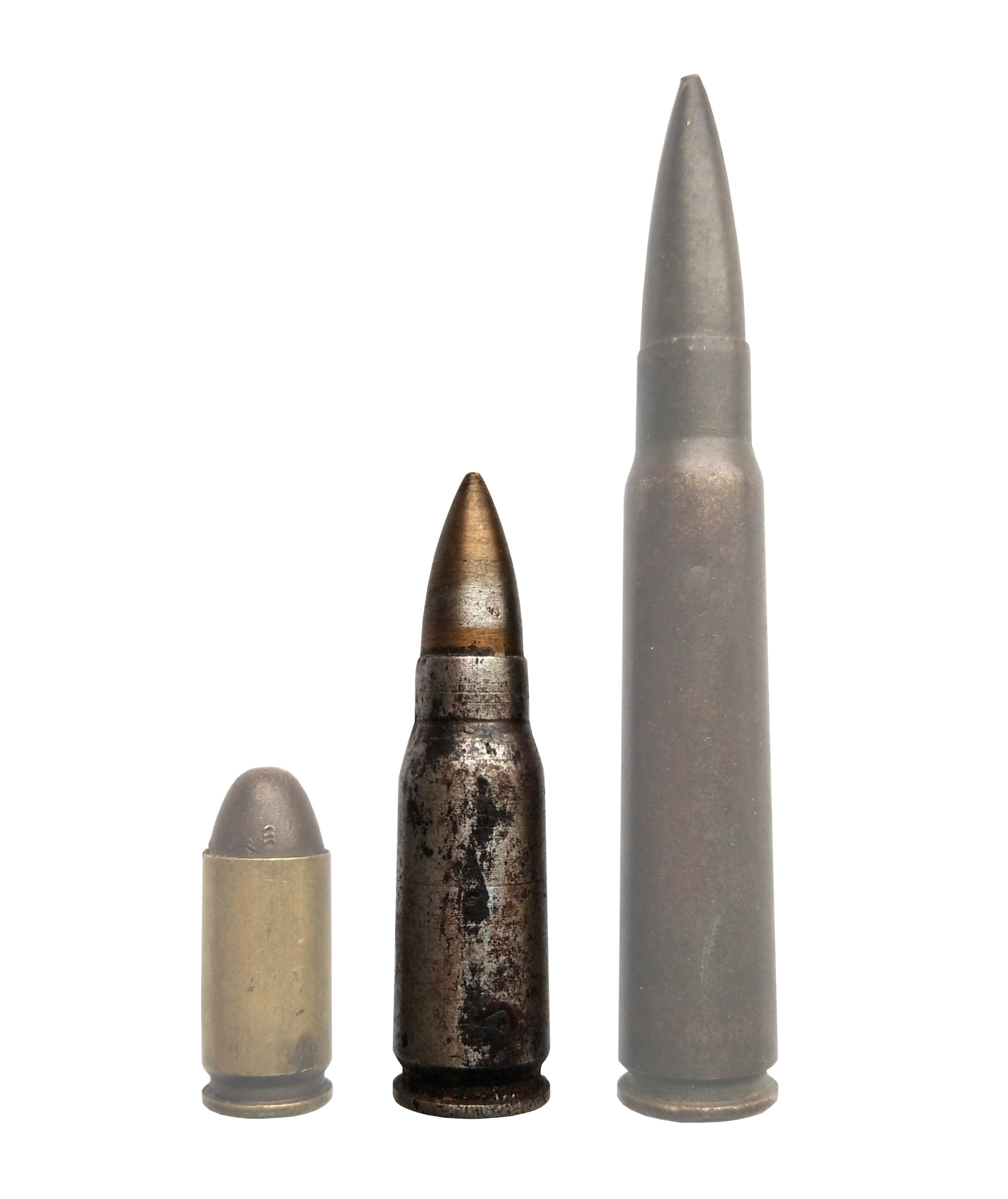
From left to right: 9×19mm (pistol cartridge) 7.92×33mm Kurz (intermediate cartridge) 7.92×57mm (fully powered cartridge)

The cartridge was the same caliber, and had the same base diameter, as the 7.92×57mm, which was employed by the standard German Army infantry rifle, the Karabiner 98k, as well as its machine guns. The German armed forces had issued a 7.92×57mm automatic (select fire) rifle, the FG 42, in limited numbers, but the heavy recoil of the round made it difficult to use effectively in this role.

What was needed was a cartridge that could be used in a lighter, more maneuverable rifle to bridge the gap between submachine guns and rifles. The standard issue 7.92×57mm cartridge case was shortened by 24 millimetres (0.94 in). With a case length of 33 millimetres (1.3 in), the Kurz round was substantially shorter and delivered less recoil than full-length 7.92×57mm Mauser ammunition, but was still almost as effective when engaging targets at typical combat ranges of 300 m (328 yd). This meant it could be fired effectively from a weapon that weighed less than a machine gun, yet still had much greater range, velocity, and stopping power than the 9×19mm Parabellum which was standard in German submachine guns. The weight of the 7.92mm Kurz m.E. round was 17.05 grams (263.1 gr), with the bullet taking up 8.1 grams (125 gr) and the cartridge and propellant the remaining 8.95 grams (138.1 gr). The 34% weight reduction compared to full-length 7.92×57mm Mauser s.S. ball ammunition meant that a soldier could carry more rounds of ammunition, for an increase in sustained suppressive fire capability.

The shortage of brass in the later stages of World War II led to the use of steel cases for this new cartridge. The Kurz cartridge incorporated more taper than the parent case to increase reliability in feed from magazines (and because the cartridge retained the same base diameter and caliber as the longer, full-size round, requiring a more abrupt taper). This led to the distinctive curved magazine for weapons that used this cartridge, which became popularly known as "banana magazine", due to their curved shape, and which can be seen on other weapons using distinctly tapered cartridges, like the 7.62×39mm chambered in Kalashnikov rifles. The steel cases were typically lacquer-coated to prevent corrosion. Most projectile variants featured a boat tail and bullets designated with m.E. - mit Eisenkern ("with iron core") mild steel cored projectiles were developed to save on lead and other metals that became scarce in Germany during World War II.

== Cartridge variants ==
During World War II the 7.92×33mm Kurz round was produced in a relative limited amount of variants, when compared to the full-power 7.92×57mm Mauser round. The German military used 7,9mm as designation and generally omitted any diameter reference and only printed the exact type of loading on ammunition boxes during World War II. Ammunition boxes can have i.L. or in Ladestreifen added, meaning the containing 7.92×33mm Kurz rounds are provided in stripper clips.

Pist. Patrone 43 m.E.
m.E. - mit Eisenkern ("with iron core") — projectile with mild steel core, ballistic coefficient of approximately 0.132 (G7 BC)
Pist. Patr. 43 L'spur
L'spur - Leuchtspur ("tracer")
Pist. Patr. m.E.L'spur
m.E.L'spur - mit Eisenkern Leuchtspur ("iron core, tracer")
Pist. Platzpatr. 43
Platz ("blank")
Pist. Treibpatrone 43
Treib ("booster charge for rifle grenades")
Pist. Expatrone 43
Exerzier ("drill") dummy rounds for aiming exercises
Pist. Werkzeugpatrone
Werkzeugpatrone ("tool cartridge") dummy rounds for examining the functioning of a firearm action

== Chambered firearms ==
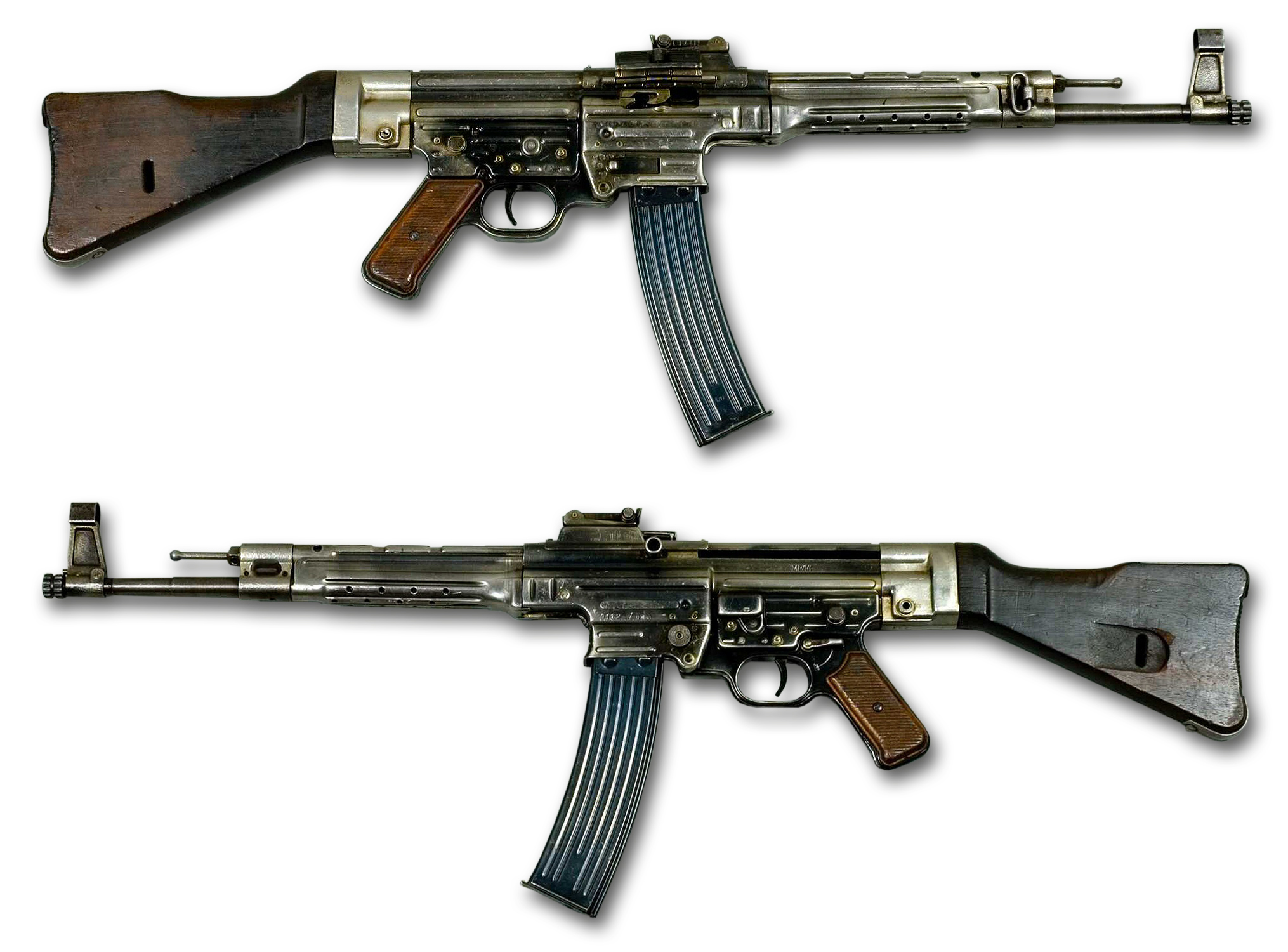
Sturmgewehr 44 (assault rifle 44)

Prior to the development of the Kurz round and its associated weapons, two basic small arms existed to equip the regular infantryman, the bolt-action rifle and the submachine gun. The bolt-action rifle was the standard small arm for most of the world's armies, usually incorporating good accuracy and stopping power, but with a very limited rate of fire. The submachine gun was a newer piece of equipment, which offered a very high rate of fire, and a compact size, but was of very limited range and stopping power due to the pistol round (usually 9 mm) it fired. While the Kurz round did not match the range and accuracy of a full power round fired by a traditional bolt-action rifle, it could still engage individual targets out to 300 m (328 yd). As an effective, intermediate-sized cartridge, the 7.92×33mm Kurz round was a key evolution in the development of the assault rifle by providing a combination of controllable automatic fire and acceptable accuracy at ranges most likely to see infantry combat.

Only a few weapons used this round, most notably the Sturmgewehr 44 – the first assault rifle to be accepted into widespread service and put into mass production – and the Gustloff Volkssturmgewehr. A number of weapons in development at the time also used the cartridge, including the Sturmgewehr 45, HIW VSK, Wimmersperg Spz-kr, Grossfuss Sturmgewehr; and a number of German and Czech prototype weapons made during World War II and a small number of prototype weapons made in other countries after the war. An unknown number of late-war K43 rifles were chambered for this cartridge and modified to accept MP 44 magazines. Variants of the VK 98 (Volks-Karabiner), a so-called last-ditch bolt-action rifle intended for the Volkssturm Home Guard, were also chambered for this cartridge with unknown quantities produced by Mauser and Steyr.

The only known belt-fed light machine gun chambered in 7.92x33mm Kurz was the Koucký ZK 423 as a rival to the soviet RD44.

A number of Karabiner 98 rifles have appeared for sale on the European market in this caliber with "NUR FÜR KURZ PATRONE" (only for short cartridge) stamped on the barrel. While there were a few Karabiner 98 rifles made in this caliber for testing during the war, these rifles are deemed by specialists and collectors to have been rechambered post-war.

The Heereswaffenamt office considered to use the FG 42 in 7.92x33mm with a few first models chambered and tested.

A small number of Remington XP-100 bolt-action target pistols were made in 7.92×33mm Kurz.

Lothar-Walther manufactures new Mauser 98 barrels chambered in 7.92×33mm Kurz.

In 2010, a gunsmith Eric Kinsel was dealing with a shortage of the rare ammunition for the AMT pistol. He discovered that the case length of 7.92x33mm Kurz was almost identical to 33mm cartridges such as .30 carbine and .50AE etc., and handloaders could simply reverse the bullets in the cases to have a much cheaper source of ammunition and fit into existing magazines. While the boat-tailed bullets performed acceptably, there was little demand and few conversion barrels were produced.

Schwaben Arms GmbH of Rottweil, Germany offers newly made K98k rifles in 7.92×33mm Kurz (also known as 8x33 in Europe) in addition to 8mm Mauser and .308 Winchester.

== Post-World War II ==
After World War II, the cartridge was tested and used in prototype rifles in Argentina and Belgium, amongst other nations, during the late 1940s and early 1950s. The first FN FAL prototype was designed to fire the cartridge when NATO was organized. After the war it was manufactured by East Germany (the German Democratic Republic), the Czechoslovak Socialist Republic, and Egypt.

Spain continued development after the war, creating a few variants of the cartridge, such as tracer rounds, boat-tailed rounds and slightly shorter bullets that have a lead core. These developments were encouraged by Calzada Bayo, a Spanish lieutenant colonel. However, they were cancelled in favour of a more radical cartridge, 7.92×40mm CETME. Finally, Spanish CETME rifles were chambered for a variant of the 7.62×51mm NATO round.

Demand for the ammunition still exists, as the StG 44 is still in use by some within the Lebanese Forces militia, Djibouti and Pakistan as well as irregular forces in some countries in the Horn of Africa and the Middle East, where captured German arms were distributed as military aid by Eastern Bloc countries as well as Yugoslavia. It is currently manufactured by the Prvi Partizan factory in Užice, Serbia. There is also some demand on the private collectors' market; reloadable cartridge cases can be produced by resizing and trimming 7.62×51mm NATO cases, and Hornady makes a 125-grain .323-inch (8.2 mm) bullet for this caliber suitable for handloads.

=== 44 Bore ===
In Pakistan, the same cartridge is also reported to be in use by the local name of "44 Bore". This either refers to the 44 of the MP44/StG44 series or the "L44A1" inscription found on the headstamps on necked-down 7.62×51mm cartridge cases. It is used in locally made AK-pattern weapons in semi-automatic only (produced or converted in Peshawer, Kohat and Derra Adam Khel, etc.) that chamber this cartridge, since 7.62×39mm is a restricted caliber (known as "prohibited bore" or "PB" in Pakistan). These AK-pattern weapons are usually considered inferior due to inconsistent gunsmithing of weapons chambered or converted for this cartridge and lack of quality control of the ammunition. It is sometimes used by private security companies. The usage of 7.92 mm bullets in 7.62 mm barrels without reboring is not considered to be a safe practice. The use of the 44 bore cartridge was a loophole in the law until specifically banned in 2012.

== See also ==
- 8 mm caliber
- Calzada Bayo CB-57
- List of rifle cartridges
- Table of handgun and rifle cartridges
