= Gas-operated reloading =

System of operation used to provide energy to operate autoloading firearms

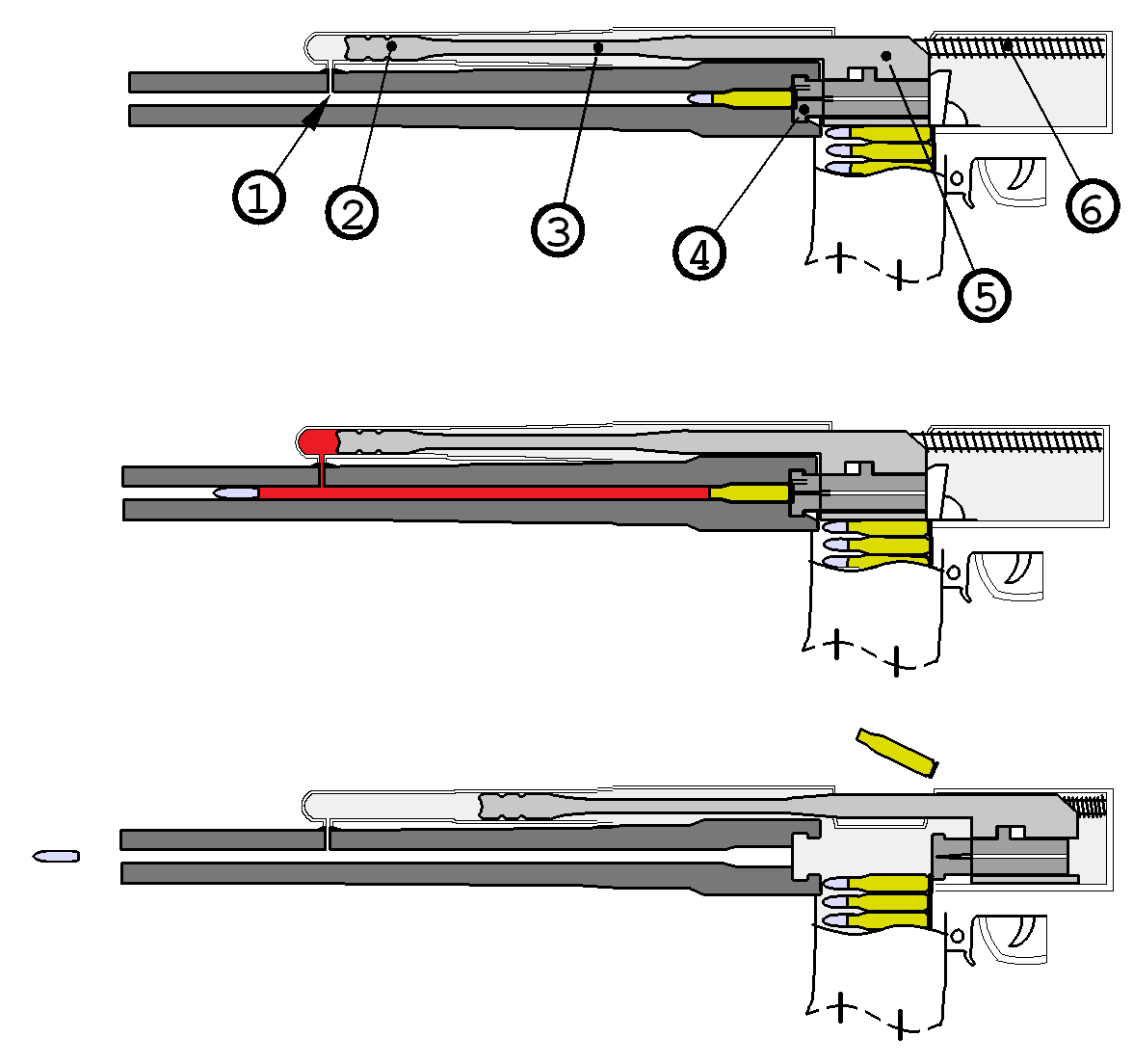
Gas-operated firearm (long-stroke piston, e.g. AK-47). 1) gas port, 2) piston head, 3) rod, 4) bolt, 5) bolt carrier, 6) spring

Gas-operation is a system of operation used to provide energy to operate locked breech, autoloading firearms. In gas-operation, a portion of high-pressure gas from the cartridge being fired is used to power a mechanism to dispose of the spent case and insert a new cartridge into the chamber. Energy from the gas is harnessed through either a port in the barrel or a trap at the muzzle. This high-pressure gas impinges on a surface such as a piston head to provide motion for unlocking of the action, extraction of the spent case, ejection, cocking of the hammer or striker, chambering of a fresh cartridge, and locking of the action.

== History ==
The first mention of using a gas piston in a single-shot breech-loading rifle comes from 1856, by the German Edward Lindner who patented his invention in the United States and Britain. In 1866, Englishman William Curtis filed the first patent on a gas-operated repeating rifle but subsequently failed to develop that idea further. Between 1883 and 1885, Hiram Maxim filed several patents on blowback-, recoil-, and gas-operation. In 1885, one year after Maxim's first gas-operated patent, a British inventor called Richard Paulson, who a year before had patented a straight blowback-operated rifle and pistol, again, one year after Maxim’s first blowback patent, patented a gas piston-operated rifle and pistol which he claimed could be used with sliding, rotating or falling bolts. He would also patent a gas-operated revolver in 1886. Paulson did construct models of his rifle and tried them in France shortly after filing his patent. Furthermore, according to A. W. F. Taylerson, a firearms historian, his patented revolver was probably workable. In 1887, an American inventor called Henry Pitcher patented a gas-operated conversion system that he claimed could be applied to any manually operated magazine rifle. In 1890 he would patent and submit an original gas-operated rifle for testing by the US government but it performed poorly and was ultimately never adopted despite being offered commercially for the civilian market. In the 1880s a gas piston-operated rifle and pistol were developed by the Clair Brothers of France who received a French patent and submitted prototypes for testing by the French army in 1888 although the true date of their invention is uncertain. They would also produce a semi-automatic shotgun in the early 1890s. In 1889, the Austro-Hungarian Adolf Odkolek von Újezd filed a patent for the first successful gas-operated machine gun.

== Piston systems ==
Most current gas systems employ some type of piston. The face of the piston is acted upon by combustion gas from a port in the barrel or a trap at the muzzle. Early guns, such as Browning's "flapper" prototype, the Bang rifle, and the Garand rifle, used relatively low-pressure gas from at or near the muzzle. This, combined with larger operating parts, reduced the strain on the mechanism. To simplify and lighten the firearm, gas from nearer the chamber needed to be used. This high-pressure gas has sufficient force to destroy a firearm unless it is regulated somehow. Most gas-operated firearms rely on tuning the gas port size, mass of operating parts, and spring pressures to function. Several other methods are employed to regulate the energy. The M1 carbine incorporates a very short piston, or "tappet." This movement is closely restricted by a shoulder recess. This mechanism inherently limits the amount of gas taken from the barrel. The M14 rifle and M60 GPMG use the White expansion and cutoff system to stop (cut off) gas from entering the cylinder once the piston has traveled a short distance. Most systems, however, vent excess gas into the atmosphere through slots, holes, or ports.

=== Gas trap ===
A gas trap system involves "trapping" combustion gas as it leaves the muzzle. This gas impinges on a surface that converts the energy to motion that, in turn, cycles the action of the firearm. As the resulting motion is forward toward the muzzle of the gun, some sort of mechanical system is needed to translate this into the rearward motion needed to operate the bolt. This adds to the complexity of the mechanism and its weight, and the placement of the trap generally results in a longer weapon and allows dirt to easily enter the mechanism. Despite these disadvantages, they use relatively low pressure gas and do not require a hole in the barrel, which made them attractive in early designs. The system is no longer used in modern weapons.

In 1884, Hiram Maxim patented a muzzle-cup system described in U.S. patent 319,596, though it is unknown if this firearm was ever prototyped. John Browning used gas trapped at the muzzle to operate a "flapper" in the earliest prototype gas-operated firearm described in U.S. patent 471,782 and used a slight variation of this design on the M1895 Colt–Browning machine gun "potato digger". The Danish Bang rifle used a muzzle cup blown forward by muzzle gas to operate the action through transfer bars and leverage. Other gas-trap rifles were early production M1 Garands and German Gewehr 41 (both Walther and Mauser models).

The American and German governments both had requirements that their guns operate without a hole being drilled in the barrel. Both governments would first adopt weapons and later abandon the concept. Most earlier US M1 Garand rifles were retrofitted with long-stroke gas pistons, making the surviving gas trap rifles valuable on the collector's market.

In the 1980s, Soviet designer Alexander Adov from TsKIB SOO modified the concept with a tube diverting gas from the muzzle to a standard long-stroke system (see below) in order to diminish influence of the gas engine on barrel and increase accuracy, but his sniper rifle wasn't adopted due to the dissolution of the Soviet Union.

=== Long-stroke ===
Diagram of long-stroke gas operation system

The stroke length of a gas-operated and piston-actuated firearm is defined by the distance travelled (by the piston) in relation to the major diameter of the piston itself. Specifically in relation to long-stroke mechanisms, the travel distance of the piston while under pressurised propulsion must be greater than the major diameter of that piston; this distance must be reached prior to the ventilation of the propulsive gasses. If the pressurised propulsive gasses are ventilated prior to this point, this would define a short-stroke piston-actuated mechanism. An often-cited example of a long-stroke gas-operated system is that where the form and fit must involve the piston, operating rod, and bolt carrier group fixed together to form a single unitary assembly. This is not a factually correct definition and is simply an observation of paired yet unrelated features within various firearms designs. It is for this reason that true long-stroke piston-actuated firearms are rare, and why such misconceptions and distortions of definitions arise. Examples of long-stroke piston-actuated firearms include (but are not limited to) the M1 Garand, and the AKM.

Other firearms, such as the M1918 BAR, present an interesting example of a firearm which could be defined as either a short-stroke or a long-stroke mechanism. The principal distance travelled by the piston while under pressurised propulsion is less than that of the diameter of the piston itself. However, the ventilation ports are located sufficiently rearwards so that a distance travelled by the piston while under some meaningful pressurisation is greater than that of the piston’s diameter. Which in effect renders the M1918 BAR’s mechanism a hybrid. The pistons initial travel is fully pressurised for a shorter distance, the gas regulator body then abruptly end where the gasses can partially bypass the piston while still providing direct propulsion at a lower pressure. After achieving a stroke length greater than the piston diameter, the gasses escape through the six consecutive (one row of three on each side) ventilation ports within the gas cylinder tube.

=== Short-stroke ===
short-stroke gas piston

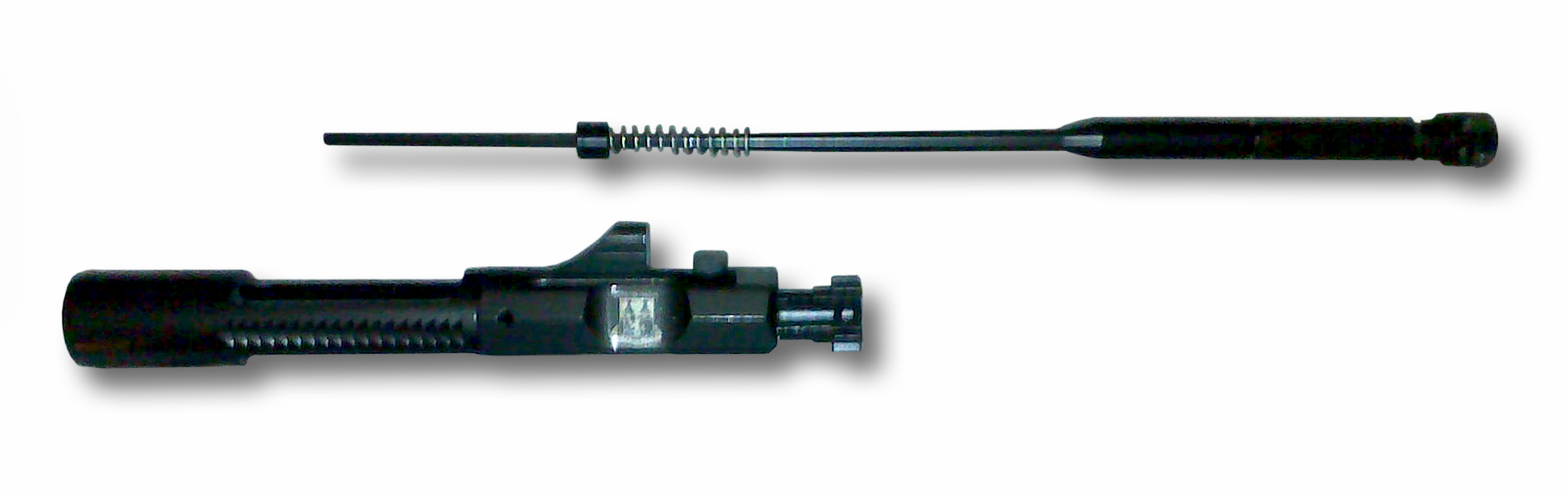
Short stroke gas piston and bolt carrier group, from a gas piston AR-15

In contrast to the long-stroke mechanism described above, a short-stroke piston-actuated mechanism is defined by a gas piston that travels under pressurized propulsion for a distance less than its own major diameter. The propellant gases are vented or bypassed before the piston reaches a distance of travel equal to its diameter. Short-stroke gas systems are more common than long-stroke systems and include sub-variants such as the tappet system found in the Steyr AUG; a tappet mechanism is not mechanically linked to the bolt carrier group and is often the cause of the misconception of what a short-stroke mechanism truly is. As with long-stroke systems, the distinction between short- and long-stroke mechanisms is often misunderstood. A frequently repeated misconception is that a short-stroke system must feature a piston and operating rod that are not connected to the bolt carrier group (a tappet mechanism). While this is a common feature in many designs, it is not a defining characteristic of stroke length. The classification depends solely on the distance the piston travels under pressure in relation to its diameter, not on whether the piston is physically linked to the rest of the operating assembly.

Returning to the M1918 BAR example previously discussed in the context of long-stroke mechanisms, its classification can also support a short-stroke interpretation. The BAR’s gas regulator includes a 0.035-inch diameter orifice that vents gas forward through the regulator body. This continuous gas venting from the outset limits the duration and distance over which the piston experiences peak pressurization. As a result, even though the piston and operating rod move as one, the piston itself may not remain under full pressure long enough to qualify as a true long-stroke system—thereby classifying the M1918 BAR as a hybrid or borderline short-stroke mechanism.

It is for the aforementioned reasons that stroke length, when used to describe the technical operation of firearm components—as in the contexts of marketing, patent filings, or technical documentation—should not be applied arbitrarily or based solely on visual or structural features. Instead, it should reflect the actual pressure-driven stroke distance of the piston in relation to its geometry.

=== Gas-delayed blowback ===
The bolt is not locked but is pushed rearward by the expanding propellant gases as in other blowback-based designs. However, propellant gases are vented from the barrel into a cylinder with a piston that delays the opening of the bolt. It is used by Volkssturmgewehr 1-5 rifle, the Heckler & Koch P7, Steyr GB and Walther CCP pistols.

=== Floating chamber ===
floating chamber

To avoid consuming a lot of relatively expensive rounds, many armies, including the United States Army, trained machine gun crews with less-expensive sub-caliber ammunition in the late 19th century and the first half of the 20th century. To do this, they needed a cheap .22 LR cartridge to operate firearms designed to use the .30-06 cartridge. David Marshall Williams invented a method that involved a separate floating chamber that acted as a gas piston with combustion gas impinging directly on the front of the floating chamber. The .22 caliber Colt Service Ace conversion kit for the .45 caliber M1911 pistol also used Williams' system, which allows a much heavier slide than other conversions operating on the unaugmented blowback mechanism and makes training with the converted pistol realistic. A floating chamber provides additional force to operate the heavier slide, providing a felt recoil level similar to that of a full power cartridge.

=== Primer actuated ===
Primer actuated unlocking.

Primer actuated firearms use the energy of primer setback to unlock and cycle the firearm. John Garand developed the system in an unsuccessful bid to replace the M1903 bolt-action rifle in the early 1920s. Garand's prototypes worked well with US military .30-06 ammunition and uncrimped primers, but then the military changed from a fast burning gunpowder to a progressive burning Improved Military Rifle (IMR) powder. The slower pressure rise made the primer actuated prototypes unreliable, so Garand abandoned the design for a gas operated rifle that became the M1 Garand. AAI Corporation used a primer piston in a rifle submitted for the SPIW competition. Other firearms to use this system were the Roth machine gun, the Postnikov APT assault rifle and Clarke carbine as described in U.S. patent 2,401,616. And in some cases as in U.S. patent 2537443A the whole primer ejecting from the cartridge through a port in the bolt cocking the striker

A similar system is used in the spotting rifles on the LAW 80 and Shoulder-launched Multipurpose Assault Weapon use a 9mm, .308 Winchester based cartridge with a .22 Hornet blank cartridge in place of the primer. Upon firing, the Hornet case sets back a short distance, unlocking the action.

=== Direct impingement ===
direct impingement

The direct impingement (DI) method of operation vents gas from partway down the barrel through a tube to the working parts of a rifle where they directly impinge on the bolt carrier. This results in a simpler, lighter mechanism. Firearms that use this system include the French MAS-40 from 1940, the Swedish Ag m/42 from 1942. The Stoner gas system of the American M16, M4, and AR-15 style rifles utilize a modified version of this where a gas tube delivers gas into the bolt carrier to impinge on the bolt, which acts as a piston to cycle the rifle. One principal advantage is that the moving parts are placed in-line with the bore axis meaning that sight picture is not disturbed as much. This offers a particular advantage for fully automatic mechanisms. It has the disadvantage of the high-temperature propellant gas (and the accompanying fouling) being blown directly into the action parts. Direct impingement operation increases the amount of heat that is deposited in the receiver while firing, which can burn off and cover up lubricants. The bolt, extractor, ejector, pins, and springs are also heated by the same high-temperature gas. These combined factors reduce service life of these parts, reliability, and mean time between failures.

== Other uses of gas in firearms ==
Animation of the Vickers muzzle booster operation, showing the expanding gases pushing the barrel to the rear relative to the cooling jacket

Several other uses have been found for exhaust gases other than to aid cycling:

Muzzle booster
The French Chauchat, German MG 34 and MG 42 machine guns, the British Vickers machine gun, and some other recoil operated firearms use a gas trap style mechanism to provide additional energy to "boost" the energy provided by recoil. This "boost" provides higher rates of fire and/or more reliable operation. It is alternately called a "gas assist", and may also be found in some types of blank-firing adapters.

Gas ejection
Patented by August Schüler, the Reform pistol featured a vertical row of barrels that advanced upwards with each shot exposing the fired chamber. As the lower barrel fired, a gas hole between the barrels pressurized the empty barrel enough to eject the case rearward. An extended spur on the hammer prevented the spent case from hitting the firer in the face. The final case required manual extraction.

== See also ==
- Delayed blowback
- Recoil operation
- Blowback
- Blow forward
