= List of delayed-blowback firearms =

Below is a list of delayed-blowback firearms.

== Lever delayed blowback ==
Name	Manufacturer	Image	Cartridge	Country	Type	Year
AA-52 machine gun	Manufacture d'armes de Saint-Étienne		7.62×51mm NATO; 7.5×54mm French	France	General-purpose machine gun	1952
Danuvia 43M	Danuvia Gepgyar		9×25mm Mauser	Hungary	Submachine gun	1939
Dragon	Rideout Arsenal		9×19mm Parabellum	United States	Semi-automatic pistol	2025
FAMAS	Nexter		5.56×45mm NATO	France	Bullpup assault rifle	1978
FNAB-43	Fabbrica Nazionale d'Armi di Brescia		9×19mm Parabellum	Italy	Submachine gun	1943
Garanin general-purpose machine guns			7.62×54mmR	Soviet Union	General-purpose machine gun	1957
MAC-58	Manufacture d'armes de Saint-Étienne		.50 BMG	France	Heavy machine gun	1958
San Cristobal Carbine	Armería San Cristóbal Weapon Factory		.30 Carbine	Dominican Republic	Carbine	1950
ST Kinetics CPW	ST Kinetics		9×19mm Parabellum; FN 5.7×28mm HK 4.6×30mm	Singapore	Submachine gun Personal defense weapon	2008
TKB-517	Tula State Plant		7.62×39mm	Soviet Union	Assault rifle	1952
VAHAN			7.62×39mm	Armenia	Assault rifle	1952

== Roller delayed blowback ==
Name	Manufacturer	Image	Cartridge	Country	Type	Year
BW20	Pakistan Ordnance Factories		7.62x51mm NATO	Pakistan	Assault rifle	2021
BW21	Pakistan Ordnance Factories		7.62x51mm NATO	Pakistan	Assault rifle	2021
Calico M960	Calico Light Weapons Systems		9×19mm Parabellum	United States	Submachine gun Carbine	1990
CEAM Modèle 1950	Centre d'Etudes et d'Armement de Mulhouse		.30 Carbine; 7.92×33mm Kurz	France	Assault rifle	1949
CETME Ameli	CETME		5.56×45mm NATO	Spain	Light machine gun	1974
CETME Model L	CETME		5.56×45mm NATO	Spain	Assault rifle	1981
CETME rifle	CETME		7.62×51mm CETME	Spain	Battle rifle	1957
CW56	Pakistan Ordnance Factories		5.56×45mm NATO	Pakistan	Assault rifle	2022
DUG	Rexim S.A.		7.62×51mm NATO	Switzerland	Battle rifle	1956
Heckler & Koch G3	Heckler & Koch		7.62×51mm NATO	West Germany	Battle rifle	1959
Heckler & Koch G41	Heckler & Koch		5.56×45mm NATO	West Germany	Assault rifle	1984
Heckler & Koch HK21	Heckler & Koch		7.62×51mm NATO	West Germany	General-purpose machine gun	1961
Heckler & Koch HK33	Heckler & Koch		5.56×45mm NATO	West Germany	Assault rifle	1968
Heckler & Koch MP5	Heckler & Koch		9×19mm Parabellum	Germany	Submachine gun	1964
Heckler & Koch P9	Heckler & Koch		9×19mm Parabellum.45 ACP; 7.65×21mm Parabellum	West Germany	Semi-automatic pistol	1965
Heckler & Koch PSG1	Heckler & Koch		7.62×51mm NATO	West Germany	Semi-automatic sniper rifle	1972
Korth PRS	Korth		.45 ACP	Germany	Semi-automatic Pistol	2010s
MDP-9	Angstadt Arms		9×19mm Parabellum	United States	Submachine gun Carbine	
PTR rifle	PTR Industries, Inc.		7.62×51mm NATO	United States	Semi-automatic rifle	2000
REAPR	Ohio Ordnance			United States	Medium machine gun	2023
SIG 510	Schweizerische Industrie Gesellschaft		7.62×51mm NATO	Switzerland	Battle rifle	1957
SIG MG 710-3	Schweizerische Industrie Gesellschaft		7.62×51mm NATO	Switzerland	General-purpose machine gun	1955
SRM Arms Model 1216	SRM Arms		12 gauge	United States	Semi-automatic shotgun	2011
Sturmgewehr 45	Mauser		7.92×33mm Kurz	Germany	Assault rifle	1944
Grand Power Stribog SP9A3				Slovakia	Submachine gun	
CZ 52	Česká zbrojovka Strakonice		7.62×25mm Tokarev	Czechoslovakia	Semi-automatic pistol	1952

== Gas delayed blowback ==
Name	Manufacturer	Image	Cartridge	Country	Type	Year
Arsenal P-M02	Arsenal Firearms		9×19mm Parabellum	Bulgaria	Semi-automatic pistol	1999
BFD 1911	Better Firearms Designs		.45 ACP	United States	Semi-automatic pistol	
Grossfuss Sturmgewehr	Grossfuss		7.92×33mm Kurz	Germany	Assault rifle	1945
Heckler & Koch P7	Heckler & Koch		9×19mm Parabellum.22 Long Rifle.32 ACP.380 ACP.40 S&W.45 ACP	West Germany	Semi-automatic pistol	1976
Kevin ZP98	Zbrojovka Brno		.380 ACP	Czech Republic	Semi-automatic pistol	2000
Laugo Alien	Ján Lučanský		9×19mm Parabellum	Czech Republic	Semi-automatic pistol	2019
Krag–Jørgensen pistol			9×19mm Parabellum	Norway	Semi-automatic pistol	
PCC	Sureshot Armament Group		.45 ACP	United States	Semi-automatic pistol	
Steyr GB	Steyr Mannlicher		9×19mm Parabellum	Austria	Semi-automatic pistol	1968
Type 77B	Norinco		9×19mm Parabellum	China	Semi-automatic pistol	1981
Volkssturmgewehr	Gustloff-Werke		7.92×33mm Kurz	Germany	Semi-automatic rifle	1944
W+F P47	Waffenfabrik Bern		9×19mm Parabellum	Switzerland	Semi-automatic pistol	1947
Walther CCP	Walther		9×19mm Parabellum	Germany	Semi-automatic pistol	2014

== Flywheel delayed blowback ==
Name	Manufacturer	Image	Cartridge	Country	Type	Year
Barnitzke machine gun			7.92×57mm Mauser	Germany	General purpose machine gun	1944

== Hesitation lock ==
Name	Manufacturer	Image	Cartridge	Country	Type	Year
701 rifle	208th Research Institute		7.62x39mm	China	Assault rifle	1966
M50 Reising	H & R Firearms		.45 ACP	United States	Submachine gun	1940
Remington Model 51	Remington Arms		.32 ACP.380 ACP	United States	Semi-automatic pistol	1917
Remington R51	Remington Arms		9×19mm Parabellum	United States	Semi-automatic pistol	2014
Rudd Arms AR-180	Rudd Arms		5.56×45mm NATO	Canada	Assault rifle	
SIG MKMO	SIG Sauer		9×19mm Parabellum	Switzerland	Submachine gun	1930
Star Si 35	Star Bonifacio Echeverria		9mm Largo.38 Auto	Spain	Submachine gun	1935

== Radial delayed blowback ==
Name	Manufacturer	Image	Cartridge	Country	Type	Year
CMMG MkG	CMMG		.45 ACP	United States	Submachine gun	2017
CMMG Banshee	CMMG		9×19mm.40 S&W.45 ACP; FN 5.7×28mm 10mm Auto	United States	Semi-automatic pistol	2021
MP-A2	A Squared Armament		9x19mm Parabellum	United States	Submachine gun	2020
NPC-9			9x19mm Parabellum	United States	Submachine gun	2020
PGS15	Preppers Gun Shop MFG		9x19mm Parabellum	United States	Submachine gun	2020

== Screw/Turnbolt delayed blowback ==
Name	Manufacturer	Image	Cartridge	Country	Type	Year
BSA Autorifle	Birmingham Small Arms		.303 British; 7.92×57mm Mauser; 7.62×54mmR	United Kingdom	Semi-automatic rifle	1924
Demro TAC-1	Demro Products Inc.		9x19mm Parabellum.45 ACP	United States	Submachine gun	1974
Kalashnikov Model 1942	Mikhail Kalashnikov		7.62x25mm Tokarev	Soviet Union	Submachine gun	1942
Krnka-Hirtenberg	Hirtenberg Ammunition Factory		7mm Krnka experimental	Austria-Hungary	Semi-automatic rifle	1908
Mannlicher Model 1893	Mannlicher		Patrone 88	Austria-Hungary	Semi-automatic rifle	1893
Salvator-Dormus M1893	Škoda Works		8x50mmR Mannlicher	Austria-Hungary	Heavy machine gun	1893
Sheppard Autorifle	U.S. Ordnance Co.		.30-06 Springfield	United States	Semi-automatic rifle	1921
Thompson Autorifle	Auto Ordnance		.30-06 Springfield	United States	Semi-automatic rifle	1923

== Toggle delayed blowback ==
Name	Manufacturer	Image	Cartridge	Country	Type	Year
Pedersen rifle	Frankford Arsenal		.276 Pedersen	United States	Semi-automatic rifle	1926
Schwarzlose machine gun	Steyr		8×50mmR Mannlicher	Austria-Hungary	Medium machine gun	1907

== Vector delayed blowback ==
Name	Manufacturer	Image	Cartridge	Country	Type	Year
Jatimatic	Tampereen Asepaja Oy		9×19mm	Finland	Submachine gun	1983–1986
KRISS Vector	KRISS USA, Inc.		9×19mm 9×21mm.357 SIG.40 S&W; 10mm Auto.45 ACP	United States	Submachine gun	2006
Piranha pistol	Piranha International Inc. Corp of NV		9×19mm	United States	Semi-automatic pistol	1969

== Detent delayed blowback ==
Name	Manufacturer	Image	Cartridge	Country	Type	Year
Show Low Manufacturing Black-Jack	Show Low Manufacturing		10mm Auto	United States	Carbine	2025
