= Star Si 35 =

Star Si-35
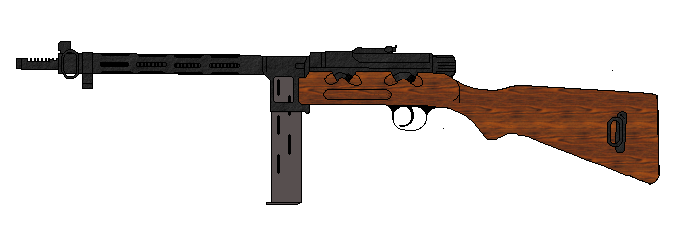
- Star Si-35
- Type: Submachine gun
- Place of origin: Spain

Service history
- Used by: See Users

Production history
- Designer: Isaac Irusta and Valentin Suenaga
- Designed: 1935
- Manufacturer: Star Bonifactio Echevierria, S.A.

Specifications
- Mass: 3.8 kilograms (8.4 lb)
- Length: 900 millimetres (35 in) Without Bayonet
- Caliber: 9mm Largo, .38 Auto
- Action: delayed (retarded) blowback, Open bolt
- Rate of fire: 300/700 rounds/min
- Feed system: Magazine 10, 30, and 40 round magazines
- Sights: Front sight and rear sights adjustable for 50 m (55 yd) and 500 m (550 yd) to 1,000 m (1,100 yd)

The Star Si-35 is a submachine gun introduced in 1935. It was produced by the Spanish company Star Bonifacio Echeverria of the Basque Region, Spain. The Star Si-35 was a classically designed submachinegun with a wooden stock and a cylindrical metal tube which contains the barrel. The weapon features a bayonet lug to allow the mounting of a Mauser rifle type bayonet. A unique feature of the weapon is a second selector lever located next to the safety lever which allows the user to change from single fire to 300 rounds per minute and 700 rounds per minute.

== Overview ==
The Star Si-35 is a 9x23mm Largo submachinegun that fires from the open bolt. It feeds from 10, 30, and 40 round magazines which were milled and not stamped. A series of submachine guns was developed in the 1930s by Echevierra company of Eibar (Brand name "Star") and the Si-35 is the penultimate version of all their models. The weapon was considered reasonably reliable but unnecessarily complicated in its design and proved both difficult and costly to manufacture. The weapon stayed the same essentially until 1942 when the design was abandoned in favor of more simple weapons designs. The weapon features two selector switches with one being a "Safe" and "Fire" selector, and the other choosing between Single shot, 300 rounds per minute and 700 rounds per minute. Additional variations of the weapon would dispense with the different rates of fire and models would simplified and would be select fire but only fire in 300 rounds per minute or 700 rounds per minute. The weapon was marketed to the United States Army in 1940 as the "Atlantic" and was tested by the British Army around the same time. Both nations decided against adoption of the weapon.

== Users ==
- Spain Small numbers used in the final months of the Spanish Civil War.
  - Guardia Civil
  - Spanish Army

== Gallery ==
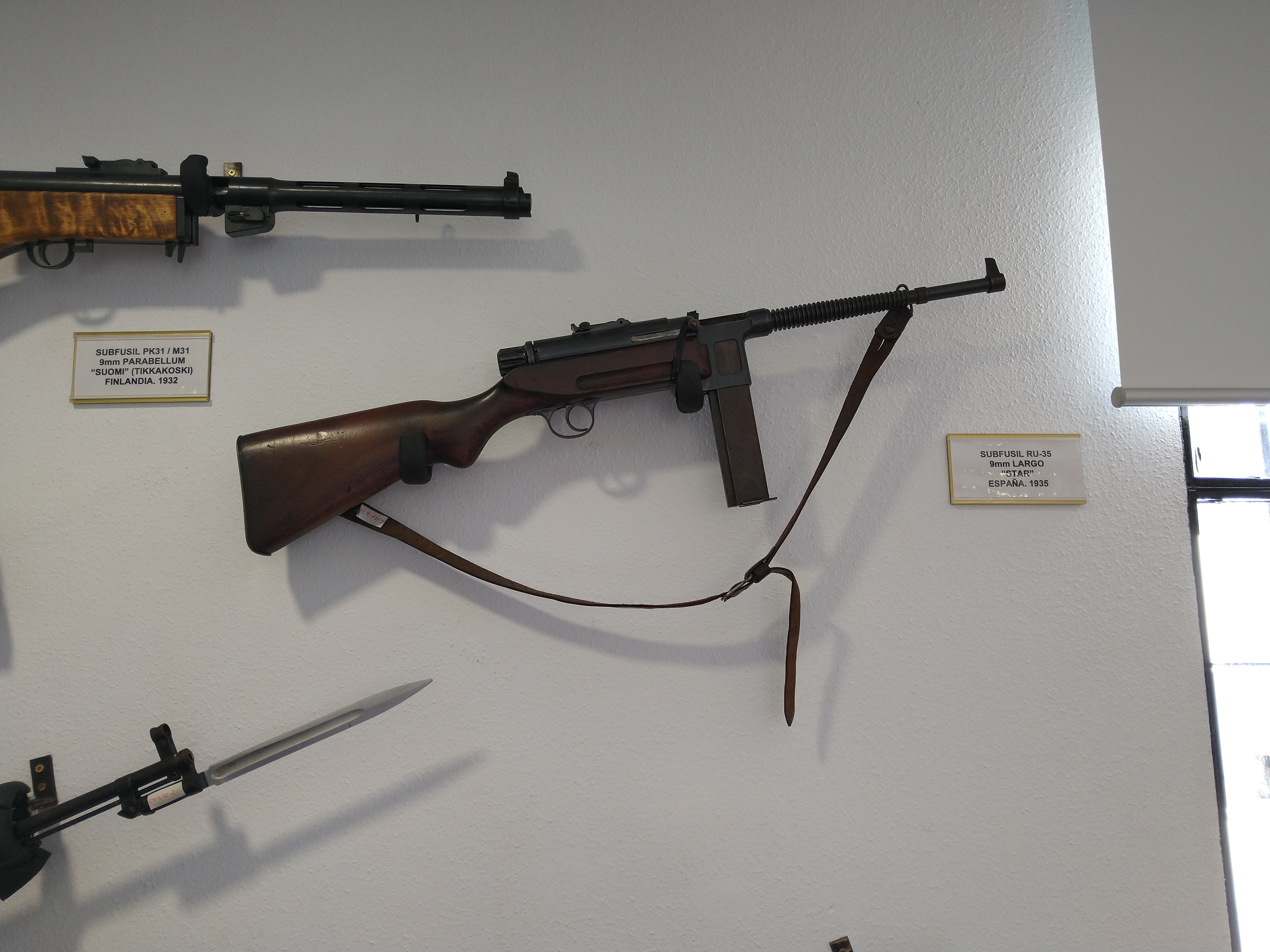
Photograph of a RU-35 model of the Star Si-35 in the "Colección museográfica de la Legión (Almería) "

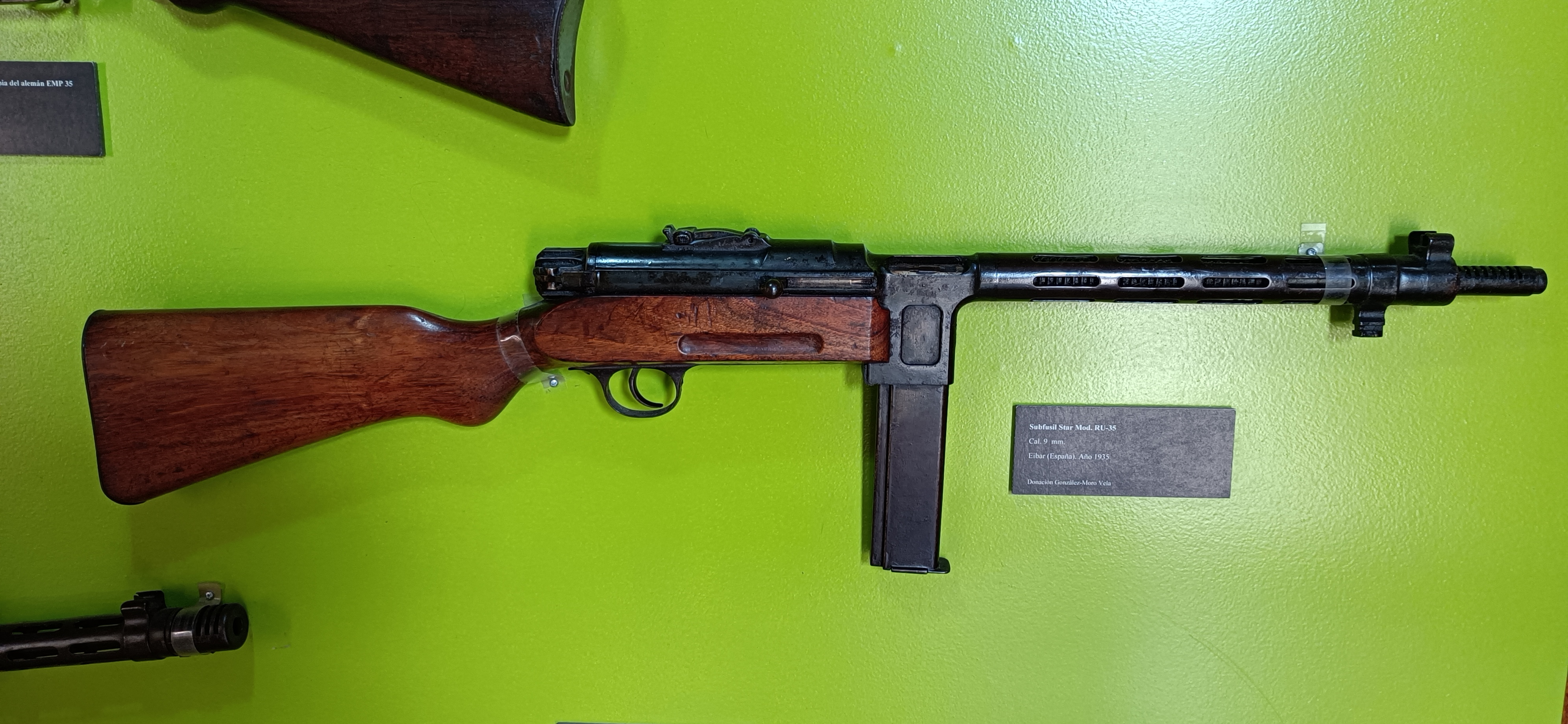
Museum photograph

== See also ==
- List of delayed blowback firearms
