= VAHAN (firearm) =

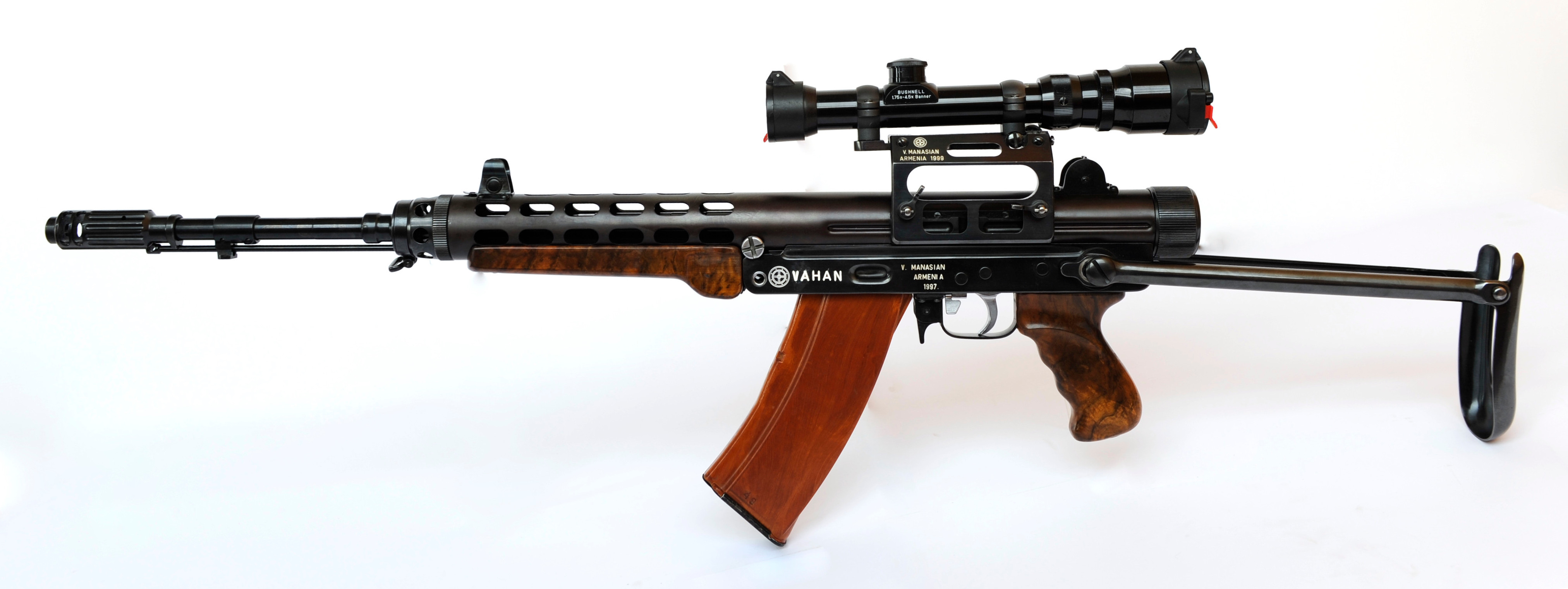
- The VAHAN assault rifle
- Type: Assault rifle
- Place of origin: Armenian Soviet Socialist Republic

Production history
- Designer: Vahan S. Manasian
- Designed: 1952–54, 1992

Specifications
- Mass: 3.85kg
- Length: 920mm (725mm folded)
- Cartridge: 5.45x39mm; 7.62x39mm (MBC-2)
- Caliber: 5.45mm
- Action: Lever-delayed blowback
- Rate of fire: 800 RPM
- Effective firing range: 500m–1000m
- Feed system: 30/45-round detachable box magazine
- Sights: Iron sights

The VAHAN (Russian: Ваган, romanized: Vagan; Armenian: ՎԱՀԱՆ, romanized: Vahan) is an assault rifle of Soviet/Armenian origin that was designed by engineer and firearms designer Vahan S. Manasian. It can be fitted with a GP-30 grenade launcher, bayonet and scope. The weapon dates back to 1952 as the MBC-2 prototype when Manasian was a soldier in the Soviet Army. As of 2009, the VAHAN rifle has not yet been tested by the Armenian government and the program has been canceled.

== See also ==
- List of assault rifles
- List of delayed-blowback firearms
