= Arsenal P-M02 =

Arsenal P-M02 Compact pistol
- Type: Semi-automatic pistol
- Place of origin: Bulgaria

Production history
- Manufacturer: Arsenal AD
- Produced: 1999–present

Specifications
- Mass: 760 g (26.81 oz)
- Length: 180 mm (7.09 in)
- Barrel length: 103.6 mm (4.08 in)
- Cartridge: 9×19mm Parabellum
- Caliber: 9 mm
- Action: Gas delayed blowback
- Rate of fire: 30 rounds/min
- Muzzle velocity: 340 m/s
- Maximum firing range: 50 m (54.7 yd)
- Feed system: 15-round detachable box magazine

The Arsenal P-M02 is a gas-delayed semi-automatic pistol It has a double-action trigger, ambidextrous safety located on the slide and a double-stack single-feed magazine holding 15 rounds. The polymer frame has steel slide rails, and a magazine catch button at the base of the trigger guard which can be placed on either side of the gun depending on user preference, and the dust cover has a picatinny rail. The barrel is made with polygonal rifling.

== See also ==
- List of delayed-blowback firearms
- Heckler & Koch P7, another gas-delayed blowback pistol
- Krag–Jørgensen pistol, another gas-delayed blowback pistol
