= CMMG MkG =

- Type: Submachine gun
- Place of origin: United States

Production history
- Designed: 2017
- Manufacturer: CMMG

Specifications
- Cartridge: .45 ACP
- Action: Radial delayed blowback
- Feed system: box magazine

The CMMG MkG is a .45 ACP carbine developed by CMMG. The weapon is an M16 derivative and uses a radial delayed blowback operation.

== Overview ==
The MkG is a .45 ACP caliber, radial delayed blowback carbine. This system uses the rotation of the bolt head to accelerate the bolt carrier of an AR-15 pattern rifle. The bolt locking lugs are adapted to incorporate angles that rotate the bolt as it travels rearward under conventional blowback power. As the bolt rotates, it must accelerate the bolt carrier to the rear through an adapted cam-pin slot. This acceleration amplifies the effective mass of the bolt carrier, slowing the speed of the bolt head. This delay allows pressure to drop prior to extraction without the penalty of a heavier bolt carrier assembly. The system is similar to roller and lever-delayed blowback in that it uses the mass of the bolt carrier moving at a faster rate than the bolt head to delay the action from opening.

== See also ==
- List of delayed blowback firearms
