= MGD PM-9 =

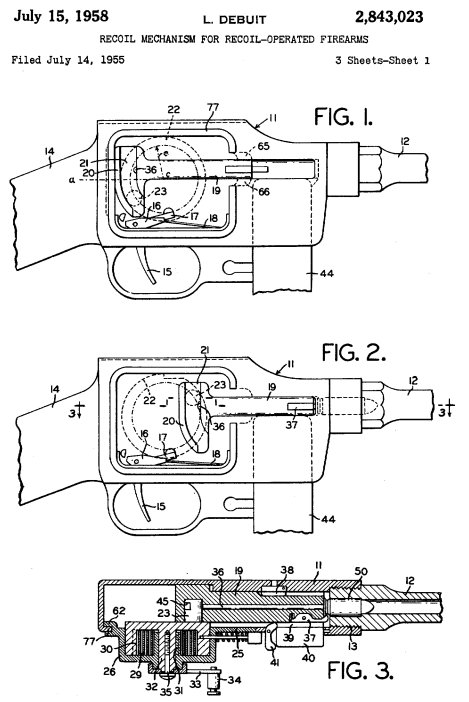
- Type: Submachine gun
- Place of origin: France

Service history
- In service: never

Production history
- Designer: Louis Debuit
- Designed: late 1940s – early 1950s

Specifications
- Mass: 2.53 kilograms (5.6 lb) (unloaded)
- Length: 659 mm (25.9 in) stock extended; 359 mm (14.1 in) stock collapsed
- Barrel length: 213 mm (8.4 in)
- Cartridge: 9 mm Parabellum, 7.65 mm Longue
- Barrels: 213 millimetres (8.4 in)
- Action: Delayed blowback
- Rate of fire: 750 rpm
- Effective firing range: 100 metres (110 yd)
- Feed system: 32-round box magazine (MP 40 compatible)
- Sights: Iron sights

The MGD PM-9 was a French open bolt submachine gun, designed in the late 1940s or early 1950s by Louis Debuit and manufactured in small numbers by French firm Merlin and Gerin in the 1950s. The PM9 was an unusual design in three different ways: It employed off-axis delayed blowback, it had a clock-style spiral mainspring similar to that of the Lewis gun, rather than the cylindrically coiled spring used in the vast majority of self-loading firearms and, most unconventionally of all, used a rotating flywheel as a delaying mass in conjunction with the bolt. It was furnished with a folding magazine, and some also had folding buttstocks, and this together with its original operating mechanism results in a highly compact weapon. There is no known record of it being purchased or deployed by any military or police force.

== See also ==
- Barnitzke machine gun
- Hotchkiss Type Universal
- KRISS Vector
- List of submachine guns
