= Rising breech carbine =

Projectile weapon

Confederate's rising breech carbine
- Type: Carbine
- Place of origin: Confederate States of America

Service history
- Used by: Confederate States of America
- Wars: American Civil War

Production history
- Designer: Candidus Bilhartz; George Hall
- Designed: 1862
- Manufacturer: Bilharz, Hall & Company, Chatham, VA
- Unit cost: $45 (CS currency)
- Produced: 1862-1864
- No. built: 100

Specifications
- Cartridge: paper cartridge
- Caliber: .54 bullet
- Action: Rising Breech
- Feed system: breech loading

The Bilharz Hall's rising breech carbine was a Confederate weapon produced and used during the American Civil War. Numerous arsenals and private firms were established to arm Confederate soldiers adequately.

These armaments appear to be consistent with the U.S Model 1855 Springfield carbine, Confederate Hodgkins carbine, and the action system resemble Hall rifle.

== History ==
.58 cal Bilharz Hall carbine

Bilhartz, Hall & Co. was established in 1862 through a partnership between Candidus Bilhartz, George Hall, and Coleman D. Bennett. Mr. Bilhartz, a German immigrant and long-term Pittsylvania County resident, served as the firm’s lead mechanical engineer, leveraging his extensive background in machining, distilling, and harness manufacturing. While George Hall directed daily operations, C. D. Bennett acted as the silent financial partner. By late 1863, the firm achieved peak operational capacity with a staff of 38 employees, diversifying its output by supplying carbine stocks to the Richmond Arsenal in addition to its primary firearms manufacturing. By September 16, 1862, Bilhartz, Hall & Co. had successfully fulfilled a contract for 400-700 .58 caliber muzzle-loading carbines and 100 rising breech carbines for the Confederate Ordnance Department.

Throughout the 2000s, the market valuation of rare carbines experienced substantial appreciation, rising from an initial range of $27,500 to $47,500, with premium units attaining sale prices between $60,000 and $80,000.
