= Demro TAC-1 =

- Type: Carbine/Submachine gun
- Place of origin: United States

Production history
- Designer: Gerard J. Fox
- Designed: 1974
- Manufacturer: TRI-C Corporation (Fox Model); Demro Products Inc. (TAC-1 Model)
- Produced: 1975–1976 (Fox Model); 1977–1982 (TAC-1 Model)

Specifications
- Mass: 7.72 lb (3.50 kg)
- Length: 29 in (740 mm)
- Barrel length: 10.5 in (270 mm)
- Caliber: 9mm Parabellum.45 ACP
- Action: Screw-delayed blowback
- Rate of fire: 700 rpm (select-fire variant)
- Muzzle velocity: 960 ft/s (292 m/s)
- Feed system: .45 ACP: 30-round box magazine; 9mm Parabellum: 32-round box magazine
- Sights: Iron

The Demro TAC-1 is a semi-automatic carbine chambered in either .45 ACP or 9×19mm Parabellum. The TAC-1 is the reintroduction of the Fox Carbine to the law enforcement market after a fallout between Gerard J. Fox, the inventor, and Dean Machine Inc. of Manchester, CT. Although it is visually similar to the Thompson submachine gun the operation and design is quite different. The design is a closer cousin to the Soviet PPSh-41.

== Design ==
The TAC-1 is an open bolt, blowback-operated firearm that uses a screw-delayed blowback operation that was first used on Mikhail Kalashnikov's submachine gun prototype.

The weapon has a grip safety as well as a safety lever on the left side of the receiver, over the pistol grip. The standard version also has a combination lock above the trigger near the safety lever. In the selective-fire variants, this safety lever doubles as a fire selector. The magazine release is found behind the magazine well, and the charging knob is on the left side of the upper receiver.

The stock, pistol grip, and foregrip of the TAC-1 are wooden.

== Variants ==
=== TRI-C Fox Carbine ===
Semi-auto carbine featuring walnut forearm, grips, stock and combination lock safety. TRI-C of Meriden, CT was founded by Gerry Fox and the first to introduce the Fox Carbine.

=== FoxCo Fox Carbine ===
Semi-auto carbine featuring walnut forearm, grips, stock and combination lock safety. FoxCo was formed after the fire that destroyed the Meriden, CT plant.

=== Demro TAC-1 Carbine ===
Semi-auto carbine featuring walnut forearm, grips, stock and combination lock safety.

=== Demro TAC-1M ===
Same as TAC-1 but without the combination lock.

=== Demro TAC-1MA Submachine Gun ===
Compact full-auto version of the TAC-1M.

=== Demro XF-7 WASP Carbine ===
Semi-auto carbine featuring high impact plastic forearm, grips and steel folding stock.

=== Demro XF-7A WASP Submachine Gun ===
Compact full auto version of the WASP.

=== TRI-C, FoxCo and Demro Pistol ===
Although it has been rumored that a pistol exists, none of these companies ever made a pistol version.

== See also ==
- List of carbines
- List of delayed-blowback firearms
