= Walther CCP =

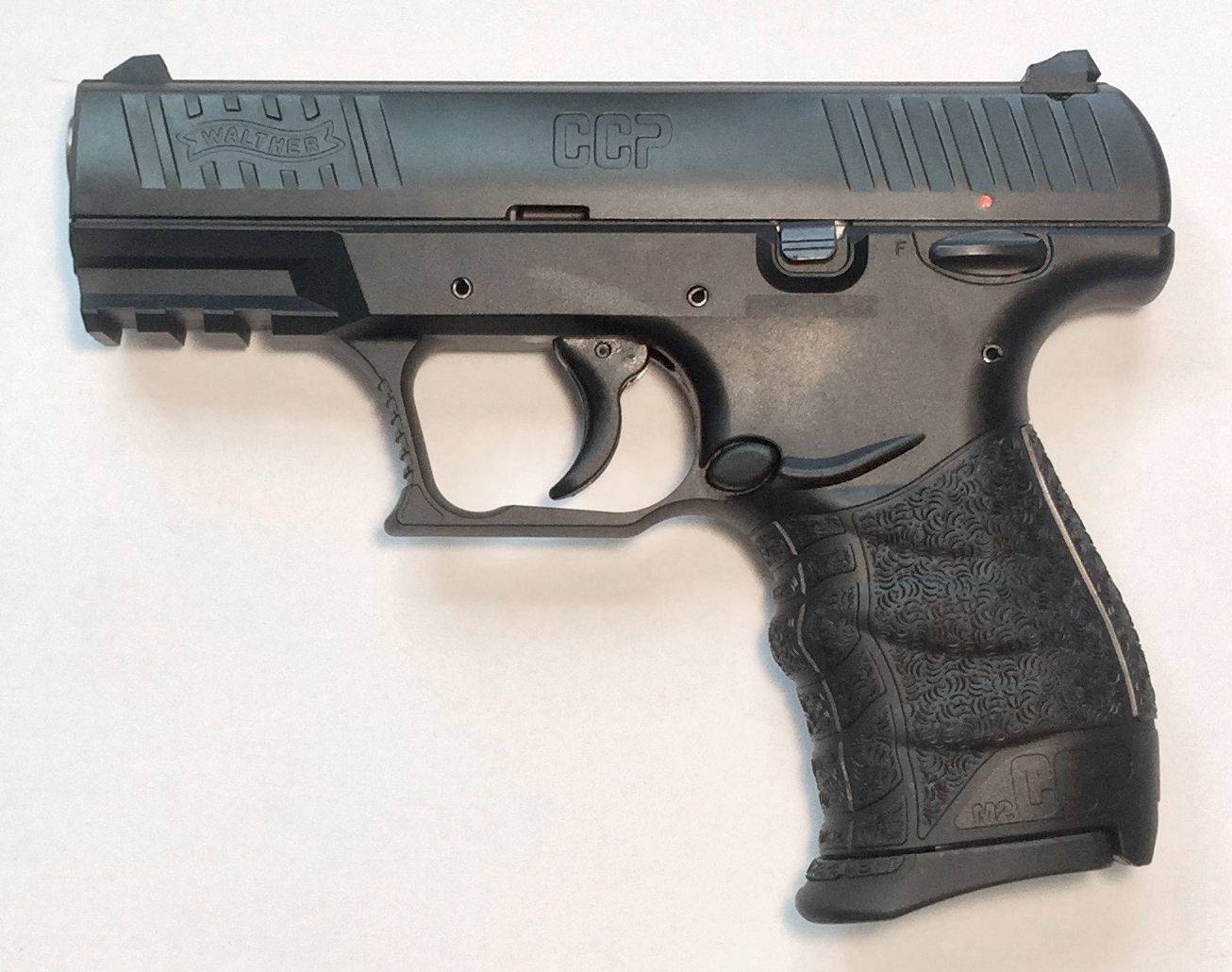
- Type: Semi-automatic pistol
- Place of origin: Germany

Production history
- Manufacturer: Carl Walther GmbH Sportwaffen
- Produced: 2014–present

Specifications
- Mass: 633 g (22.3 oz)
- Length: 163 mm (6.4 in)
- Barrel length: 90 mm (3.5 in)
- Width: 30 mm (1.2 in)
- Height: 130 mm (5.1 in)
- Cartridge: 9×19mm Parabellum,.380 ACP (CCP M2 380)
- Action: Gas-delayed blowback
- Feed system: 8-round detachable box magazine
- Sights: Interchangeable front sights, Adjustable rear polymer sight

The Walther CCP (Concealed Carry Pistol) is a delayed blowback semi-automatic pistol developed by Carl Walther Sportwaffen for the concealed carry civilian market.

== Product evolution ==
The Walther CCP was introduced in March 2014. It is available chambered in 9×19mm Parabellum.

In September 2018 Walther introduced the updated CCP M2 onto the market. Its most significant upgrade was a take-down lever that eased the field stripping, which was often cited as original M1 design's biggest shortcoming.

Circa January 2019, Walther introduced the CCP M2 380, a variant with .380 ACP a caliber option. The CCP M2 380 became available to markets in January 2020.

== Design details ==
The Walther CCP is operated by a gas-delayed blowback system, using gas pressure from the ignited cartridge by directing it through a small port in the barrel in front of the chamber to slow down and delay the rearward motion of the slide. This design is nearly identical to the design of the Heckler & Koch P7. Walther calls this system Softcoil. Unlike the Walther P99 or Walther PPQ, the CCP has a slim manual thumb safety. There is an additional internal safety that acts as a firing pin block. The ergonomic grip is a shorter version of the PPQ's grip. The capacity of the magazine is 8 rounds. The CCP has an overall length of 6.41 inches (163 mm), its width is 1.18 inches (30 mm) and its height is 5.1 inches (130 mm). The length of the barrel is 3.54 inches (90 mm). Considering the CCP's size, the 5.5-pound-force (24 N) trigger pull and the 0.27-inch (6.9 mm) trigger travel are relatively high.

Field stripping of the original CCP design (M1), required a special disassembly tool, while the revised CCP/M2 features a takedown lever for tool-less disassembly.

Walther has prepared a list of "test" ammunition and suggested grip instructions for best function, available to owners of the pistol upon request.

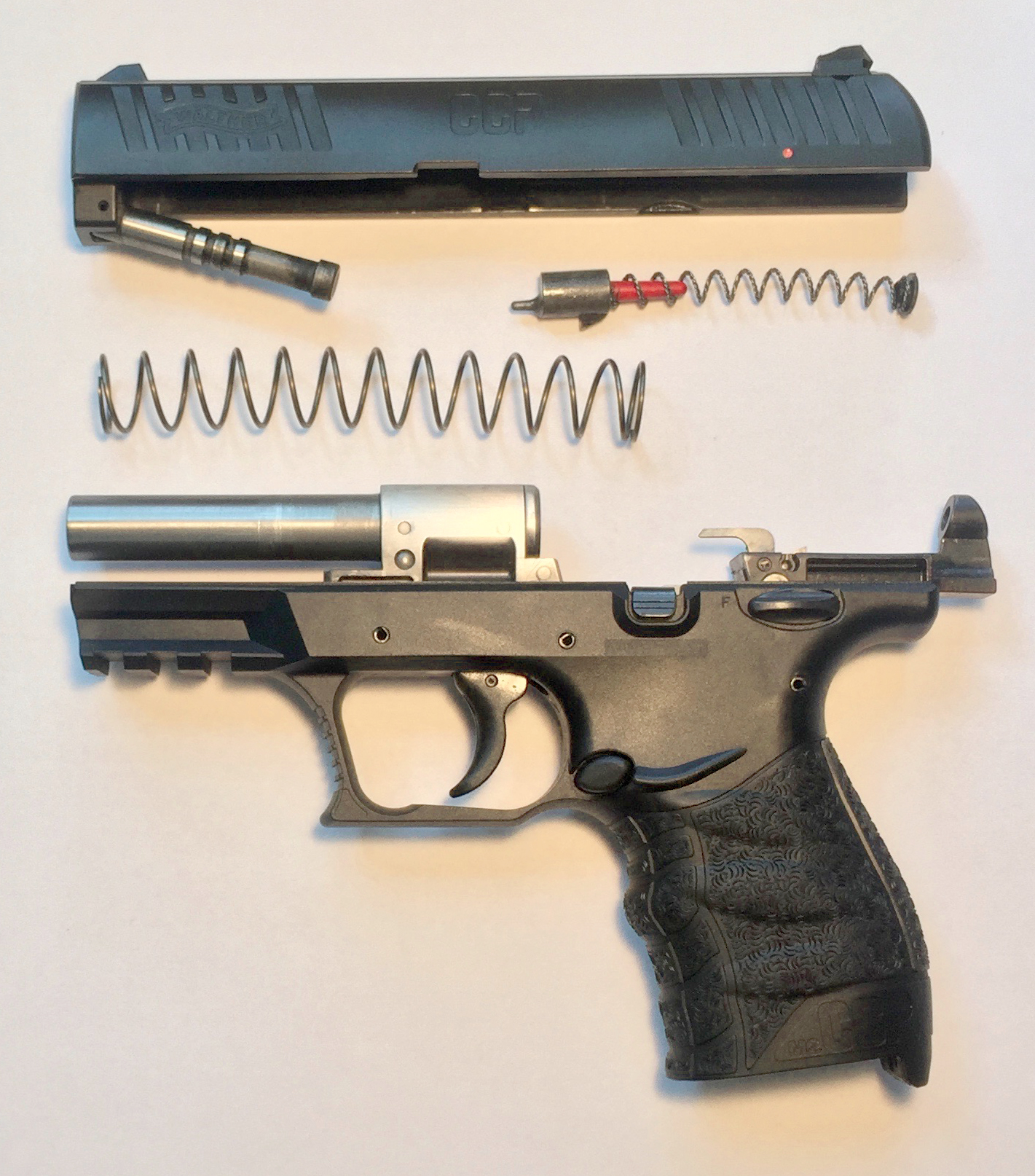
Disassembled Walther CCP M2

== Recall ==
In March 2017, Walther issued a recall notice on all CCP pistols, because of what they call a potential condition in the CCP that can cause the firearm, if dropped, to discharge regardless of the manual safety being engaged or disengaged. Walther has issued a voluntary recall as a result and will be upgrading all affected CCPs in order to remove the risk of a drop-fire.

== See also ==
- Arsenal P-M02—another pistol using the Barnitzke system
- Heckler & Koch P7—another pistol using the Barnitzke system
- Steyr GB—another pistol using the Barnitzke system
