= Heckler & Koch P7 =

P7
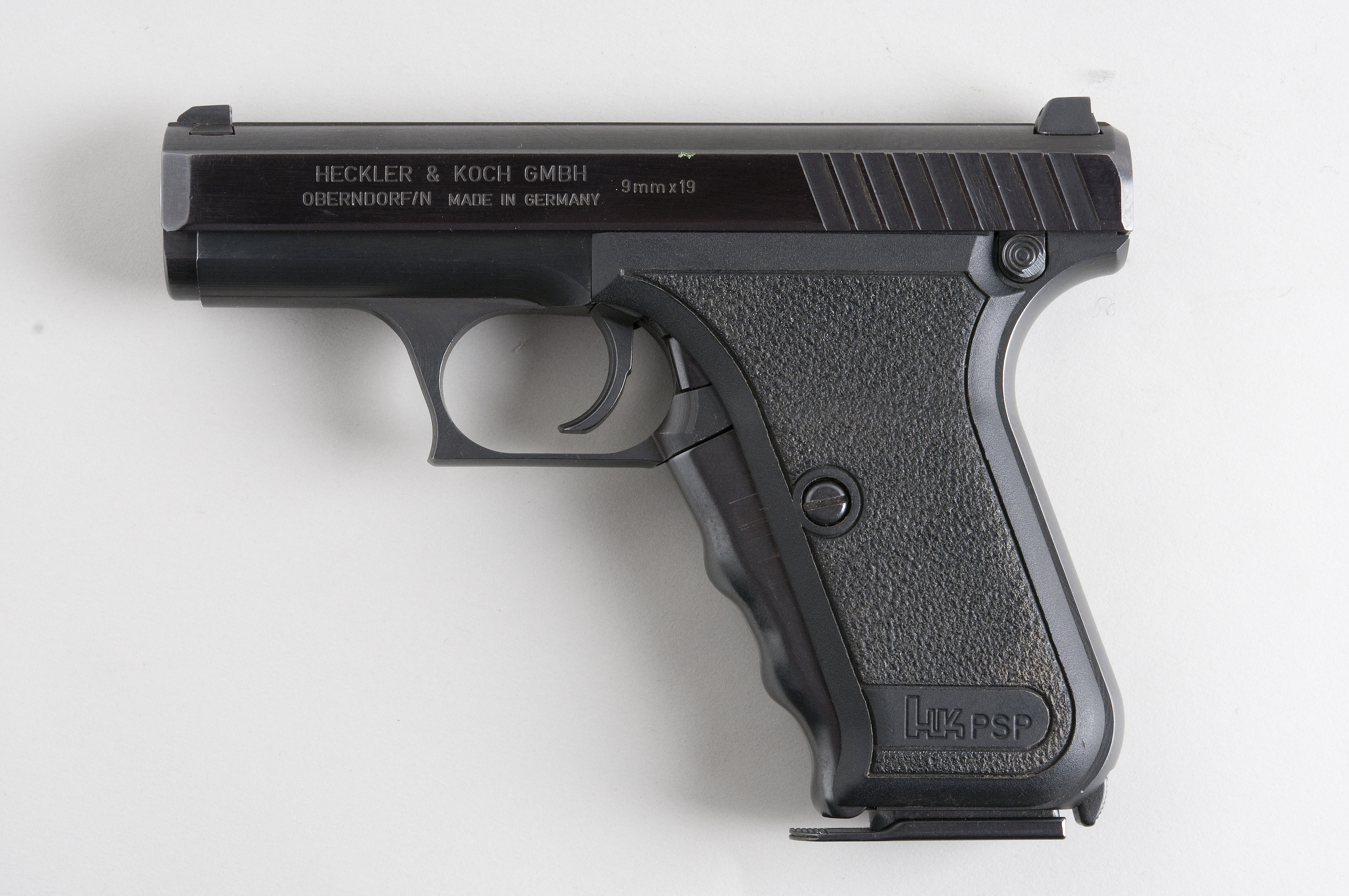
- H&K PSP
- Type: Semi-automatic pistol
- Place of origin: West Germany

Service history
- Used by: See Users
- Wars: Lebanese Civil War

Production history
- Designer: Helmut Weldle
- Designed: 1976
- Manufacturer: Heckler & Koch
- Produced: 1979–2008
- Variants: See Variants

Specifications
- Mass: PSP: 785 g (27.7 oz); P7M8: 780 g (28 oz); P7M13: 850 g (30 oz); P7K3: 775 g (27.3 oz) (.22 LR) / 760 g (27 oz) (.32 ACP) / 750 g (26 oz) (.380 ACP); P7M10: 1,250 g (44 oz); P7PT8: 720 g (25 oz)
- Length: PSP: 166 mm (6.5 in); P7M8, P7PT8: 171 mm (6.7 in); P7M13, P7M10: 175 mm (6.9 in); P7K3: 160 mm (6.3 in)
- Barrel length: PSP, P7M8, P7M13, P7M10, P7PT8: 105 mm (4.1 in); P7K3: 96.5 mm (3.8 in)
- Width: PSP, P7M8: 29 mm (1.1 in); P7M13, P7M10: 33 mm (1.3 in); P7K3: 29 mm (1.1 in)
- Height: PSP: 127 mm (5.0 in); P7M8: 129 mm (5.1 in); P7M13: 135 mm (5.3 in); P7M10: 145 mm (5.7 in); P7K3: 125 mm (4.9 in)
- Cartridge: PSP, P7M8, P7M13: 9×19mm Parabellum; P7K3: .22 Long Rifle, .32 ACP, .380 ACP; P7M10: .40 S&W; P7PT8: 9×19mm PT; P7M7: .45 ACP (prototype only)
- Action: PSP, P7M8, P7M13, P7M10: Gas-delayed blowback; P7K3, P7PT8: Straight blowback
- Muzzle velocity: PSP, P7M8, P7M13: 351 m/s (1,152 ft/s); P7K3: 275 m/s (902.2 ft/s) (.22 LR) / 330 m/s (1,082.7 ft/s) (.32 ACP) / 305 m/s (1,000.7 ft/s) (.380 ACP); P7M10: 300–345 m/s (984.3–1,131.9 ft/s); P7PT8: c. 410 m/s (1,345.1 ft/s)
- Feed system: PSP, P7M8, P7K3, P7PT8: 8-round box magazine; P7M13: 13-round box magazine; P7M7: 7-round box magazine; P7M10: 10-round box magazine
- Sights: Front blade, rear notch; 148 mm (5.8 in) sight radius

The Heckler & Koch P7 is a German 9×19mm semi-automatic pistol designed by Helmut Weldle and produced from 1979 to 2008 by Heckler & Koch GmbH (H&K). The P7M13, a variant of the P7 with a double-stack magazine, was produced until 2000.

== History ==
After the 1972 Munich Olympics Massacre, the German police forces decided to replace their .32 ACP Walther PP with a similarly sized but more effective pistol chambered for the 9×19mm Parabellum. The new firearm was to weigh no more than 1,000 g (35 oz), not exceed 180 × 130 × 34 mm, and have a muzzle energy of no less than 500 J and a service life of at least 10,000 rounds. The pistol was also to be fully ambidextrous, safe to carry with a loaded chamber (both holstered and concealed in a pocket), and able to be quickly drawn and instantly ready to fire. After a competitive bid, the German police forces selected three pistols: the Swiss SIG Sauer P225 (designated the P6) and two German designs: the P7 (officially designated the PSP) and the Walther P5.

The gun was announced in 1976 as the PSP (Polizei-Selbstlade-Pistole—"police self-loading pistol").

Series production of the P7 started in 1979. Shortly after, the pistol was adopted by the German Federal Police's counter-terrorism unit (GSG 9) and the German Army's special forces formations. The P7 was produced primarily by H&K but also under license in Mexico by the Departamento de Industria Militar (DIM), as a sidearm for general officers and staff. The pistol was also exported to several countries.

The P7 was submitted to the U.S. Army Joint Service Small Arms Program as a replacement for the M1911 pistol, but lost to the Beretta 92SB-F, which was adopted by the Army as the Beretta M9 pistol.

== Design details ==
=== Operating mechanism ===
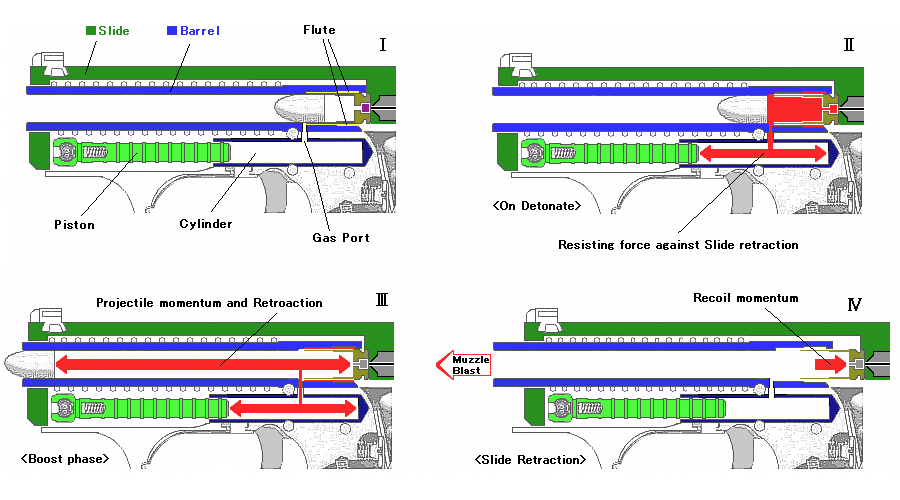
A schematic of the P7's gas-delayed blowback system.

The P7 is a semi-automatic blowback-operated firearm. It features a unique gas-delayed blowback system modeled on the Swiss Pistole 47 W+F (Waffenfabrik Bern) prototype pistol (and ultimately on the Barnitzke system first used in the Volkssturmgewehr 1-5), which used gas pressures from the ignited cartridge and fed them through a small port in the barrel (in front of the chamber) to retard the rearward motion of the slide. This is accomplished by means of a piston contained inside a cylinder located under the barrel that opposes the rearward motion of the slide until the gas pressure has declined—after the bullet has left the barrel—hence allowing the slide to end its rearward motion, opening the breech and ejecting the empty cartridge case.

The chamber has 18 flutes that aid in the extraction process by allowing combustion gases to flow between the fired case and the chamber walls, preventing the case from "sticking". The drawback of this system is that the breech opens slightly prematurely to allow the slide to initiate its rearward motion. The high temperature gases channeling into a tube located between the chamber area and the trigger made the early versions of this pistol uncomfortable, according to some, due to the heat generated after extended firing. The advantages of this system are a simpler manufacturing process due to the absence of a locking system and a high mechanical accuracy due to the barrel being fixed in the frame; the barrel is not subject to any sort of lateral or vertical movement during the operating cycle as with the Browning cam-action systems common to many locked-breech pistols.

=== Features ===
The P7's spring extractor is contained within the slide, while the fixed ejector is a surface on the slide catch.

The grip of this pistol features a built-in cocking lever located at the front of the grip. Before the pistol can be fired, this lever must be squeezed; thus this lever acts as a safety. The pistol is striker fired. Squeezing the cocking lever with a force of 70 N (15.7 lb_{f}) cocks the firing pin. Once fully depressed, only 2 lb_{f} (8.9 N)of force are required to keep the weapon cocked. The weapon is then fired by pressing the single stage trigger rated at approximately 20 N (4.5 lb_{f}) As long as the lever is depressed, the weapon fires like any other semi-automatic pistol. If the lever is released, the weapon is immediately de-cocked and rendered safe. This method of operation dispensed the need for a manual safety selector while providing safety for the user carrying the pistol with a chambered round, and increased the speed with which the pistol could be deployed and fired. The trigger and firing mechanism's method of operation (and the unique slide catch) were protected by U.S. patent 4,132,023, issued on January 2, 1979.

The P7 is fed from a single-stack box magazine with a capacity of 8 rounds, which is held inside the firearm's frame with a release located at the heel of the grip. After the last round has been fired, the slide will remain open thanks to a slide catch that can be released by pulling the slide further back or pressing the squeeze cocker.

The firearm uses a fixed, polygonal rifled barrel (hexagonal with a 250 mm twist rate) and a fixed notched iron sight with contrast dots that enable shooting in low-level lighting conditions. The pistol is completely ambidextrous and two-handed use is enhanced through the use of a profiled and enlarged trigger guard.

Between circa 1983 the P7 received several modifications, mainly to address American market demand and shooter preferences. These modifications resulted in the P7M8 and P7M13 models. A new magazine release lever (available on both sides of the frame) was installed just beneath the trigger guard, which forced designers to modify both the pistol's frame and magazine. The trigger guard was equipped with a synthetic heat shield that protects the shooter from excessive heating and a lanyard attachment loop was added in place of the previous magazine heel release. The firing pin and its bushing were also changed.

== Variants ==
Based on the P7 several other variants were built: the P7PT8, P7M13, P7K3, P7M10 and the P7M7, none of which remain in production. Production of the "P7" heel release design ended in 1997 with the KH date coded pistol marked "P7" on the Grip and "PSP" on the slide.

The P7PT8 is a dedicated, straight blowback training pistol modified for use with the 9×19mm PT training cartridge (made by Geco) with a plastic bullet (weighing 0.42 g). A "floating chamber" adapter is used inside the barrel which enhances felt recoil for use with the special ammunition. The pistols were marked with blue dots on both sides of the slide to differentiate the P7PT8 from other P7 pistols that can chamber lethal ammunition. To date about 200 pistols of this type were produced that are used mainly for simulated firing in enclosed spaces.

The P7M8 is the P7's counterpart with larger trigger guard, lengthened trigger, heat shield, thumb operated magazine release, larger rear sight dovetail, protruding firing pin bushing and lanyard ring. Production began in 1983 and continued until 2007. A final production run of 500 P7M8 pistols were produced under the AH date code (year 2007). Each is marked on the right side of the slide with X of 500. Other than the slide marking no other features nor accessories were added to the usual kit. To commemorate 25 years of P7 production, H&K offered a limited run of P7M8 "Jubilee" edition. Only 500 examples were ever made. Included in the package were a wooden lockable presentation case, P7 challenge coin, and special markings. The slide's top-left radiused edge has the designer's name (Helmut Weldle) and "1 von 500" (German, and including the double quotes; it translates to "1 of 500" in English) etched onto its surface. The wooden grips were made by Karl Nills and had the H&K logo.

The P7M13 is the P7's counterpart with a double-stack magazine and a 13-round capacity. This pistol was entered to the US Army XM9 pistol trials as a replacement for the aging M1911 pistol, but ultimately lost to the Beretta M9. A variant known as the P7M13SD was produced in limited numbers exclusively for German special forces, featuring a longer (compared to the P7M13) threaded barrel and a sound suppressor. The P7M13 was produced until 2000.

The P7K3 is a shortened version of the P7 (inspired by the HK4 pistol) that uses straight blowback for operation. This version has a removable barrel and uses a sealed hydraulic recoil buffer in place of a gas cylinder. After swapping out the barrel and magazine it can use .380 ACP (9×17mm Short) or .32 ACP (7.65×17mm Browning SR) pistol cartridges and after replacing the slide, magazine and barrel (with floating chamber insert)—it can also be used to fire .22 LR (5.6mm Long Rifle) ammunition. The hydraulic recoil buffer of the P7K3 is prone to wear and causes a serious problem to operate the gun when it is worn down. Heckler & Koch does not make a replacement part for the buffer. However, there are some commercial buffers available. When the .22 LR slide and barrel are installed, the buffer is not engaged. The slide of the .22 LR has an opening at the front that allows the buffer to be unused when firing the gun. Heckler & Koch provides a special scraper tool for the .22 LR-barrel. The tool is needed to clean the inside of the floating chamber for safe operation. An additional exchange tool is provided for all calibers to screw and unscrew the barrel nut that attaches the barrel to the frame. Both tools can be seen in one of the pictures of the P7K3 on this page. P7K3's are more rare in the U.S. than in Europe and are valued at higher prices especially when they are in good condition.

The P7M10 was introduced to the American market in 1991. It is chambered for the .40 S&W (10×22mm Smith & Wesson) round and has a double-stack 10-round magazine. With the American market in mind, a variant known as the P7M7 designed to use the .45 ACP (11.43×23mm Automatic Colt Pistol) cartridge was also created. However, it remained only a prototype due to excessive costs and complexity of creating such a weapon.

== Reception ==
The P7 was "very well received" by the German Police, who complained when it was removed from service in the 2000s. While the P7 was lightweight, reliable and accurate, because of its high cost, it lost many sales in both military and police units to cheaper offerings by other companies, such as Beretta, Glock, and Smith & Wesson. Today, P7s can sell for anywhere between $600 and $2000.

However, the P7 is also subject of criticism as well. According to 1996 report by the German Weapons Journal (Deutsches Waffen-Journal / DWJ), the P7 had caused various deaths in Lower Saxony in the 1990s due to incorrect operation/human error. The P7 is designed so that it can be fired when the trigger and safety/cocking handle are being held at the same time. A design oversight means operator can pull the trigger first and then the cocking handle, as the pistol does not differentiate which is pressed first. Because of this, several accidents occurred in stressful situations, when police officers would reflexively pull the trigger and then the safety/cocking handle, resulting in unintended injury and/or deaths of colleagues as well as suspects.

At same time, DWJ published an article on how the P7 could be changed so that the trigger becomes inoperative if it is pulled when the grip is relaxed and after pulling the grip only after relieving the load, such as after a shot, is re-armed. It is unknown whether or how many weapons were converted accordingly.

Due to the firing system, the gun gets very hot in the area of the front grip, where the gas cylinder is located. This was particularly troublesome with the original version of P7, the PSP. Subsequent models, such as P7M8, rectified this by installing a plastic heat shield above the trigger guard.

HK operating instructions indicate it is possible to reduce the sound of the firing pin/spring relaxing, by pulling the slide back a little while relaxing; however, the movement of the handle is still clearly audible when tensioning and relaxing, which is perceived as a disadvantage in certain tactical situations.

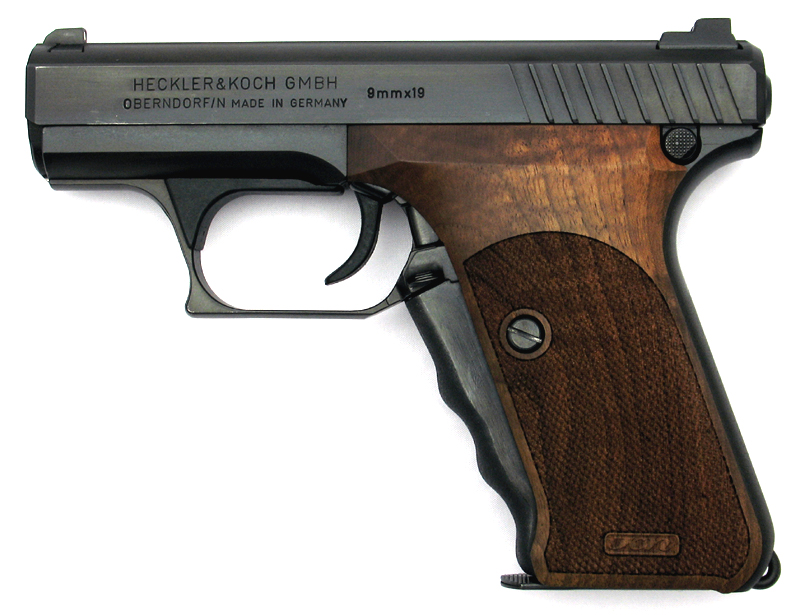
P7M8 with Karl Nill wood grips.

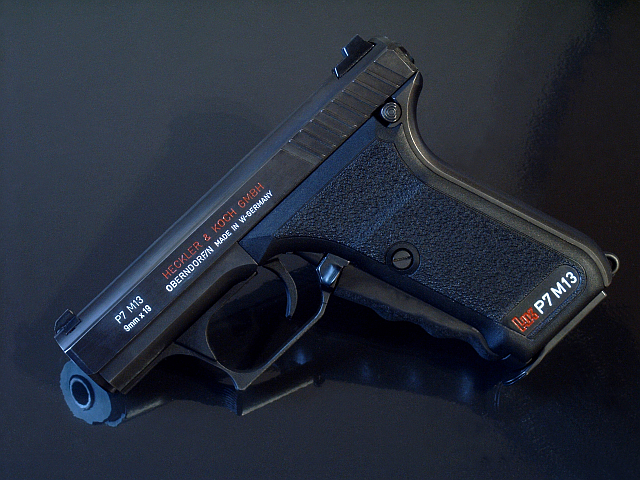
Heckler & Koch P7M13.

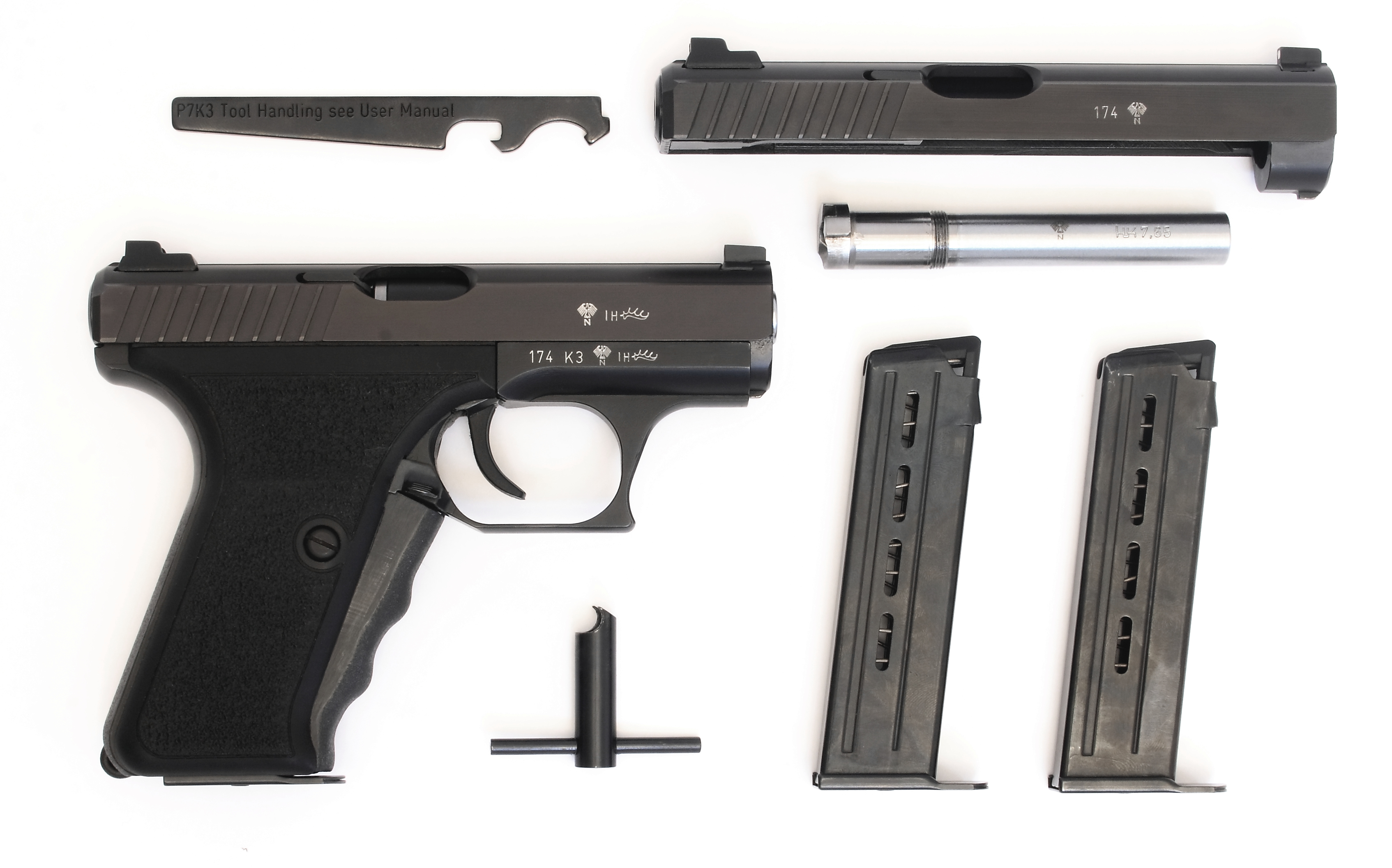
Heckler & Koch P7K3 (.22 LR slide and barrel installed, additional .32 ACP (7.65mm) slide, barrel and two magazines are visible, so are the exchange tool and carbon scraper)

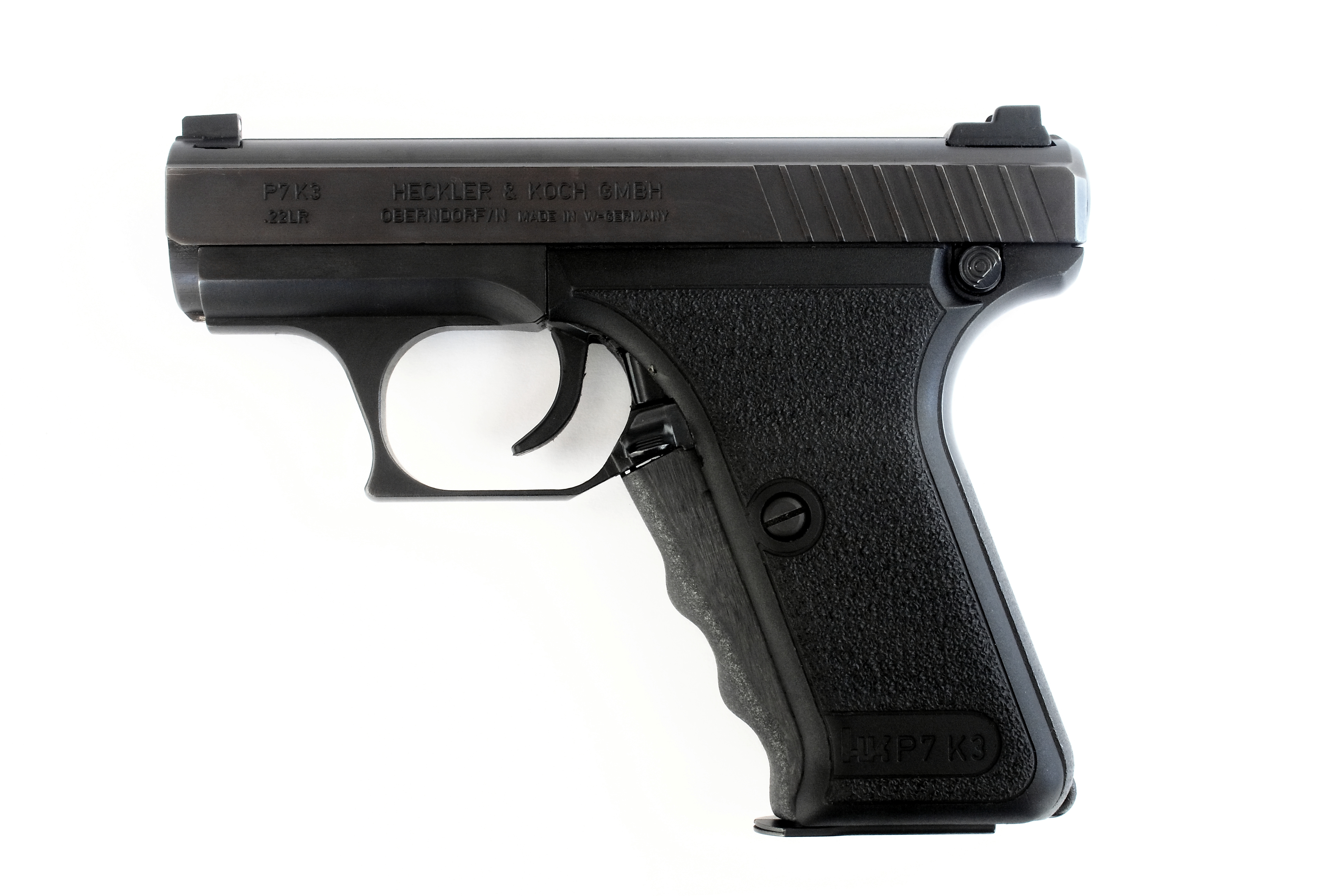
Heckler & Koch P7K3

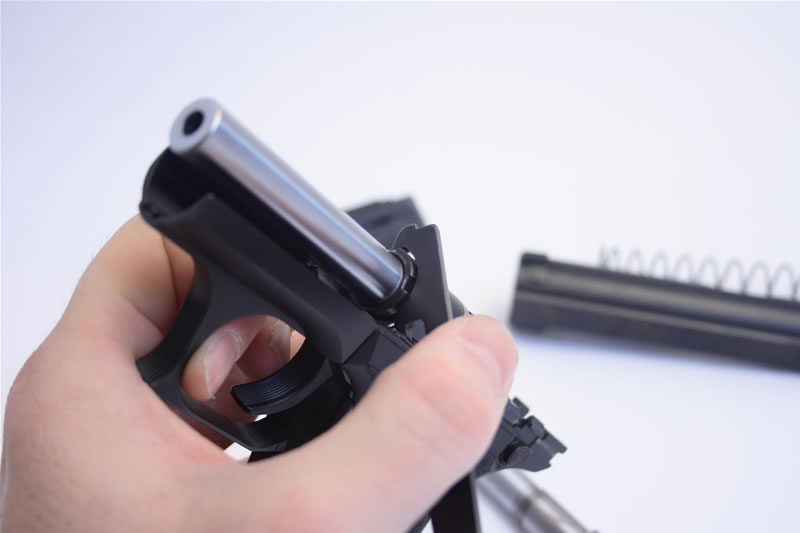
Heckler & Koch P7K3 using the exchange tool to tighten to barrel nut to install a .32 ACP barrel

== Users ==
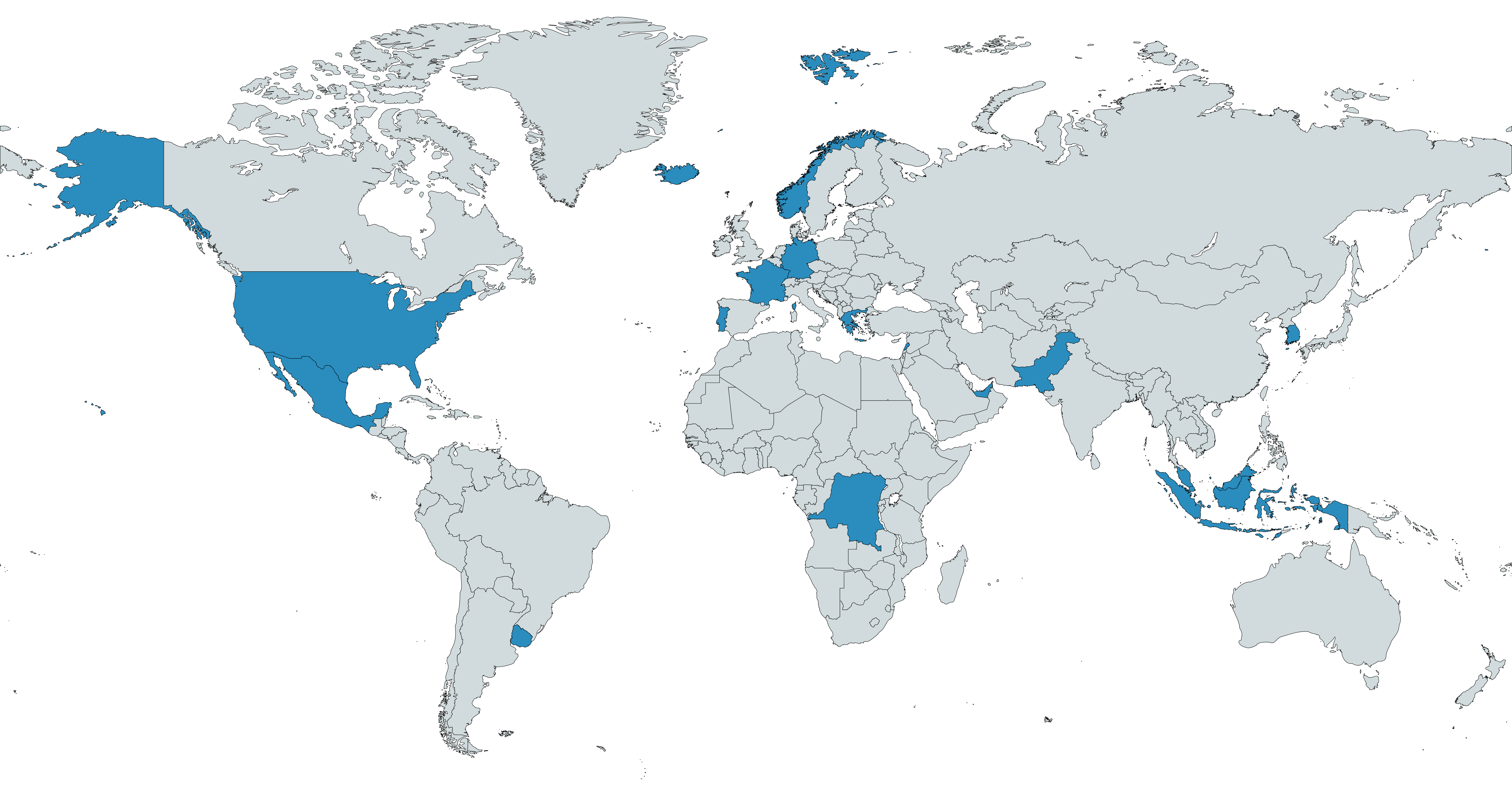
A map with Heckler & Koch P7 users in blue

- Democratic Republic of Congo: P7M13 variant.
- France
- Germany: Was used by the military police (Feldjäger), Federal Police (Bundespolizei) and several other police departments. The P7 PSP remained in use with the Bavarian state police until 2019.
- Greece: P7M8 variant.
- Iceland: Used by the Viking Squad.
- Indonesia: P7M8 variant is used by Marine Corps.
- Lebanon
- Luxembourg: P7M13 variant is used by the Unité Spéciale de la Police intervention unit of the Grand Ducal Police.
- Malaysia
- Mexico: Locally manufactured version with frame-mounted safety lever placed on the right side of the frame as required by the Mexican government, known as the P7M13S, created under license in 1983 by the Departamento de la Industria Militar (Military Industry Department) of the Dirección General de Fábricas de la Defensa.
- Norway: P7M8 variant.
- Pakistan: Used by Special Services Group.
- Portugal
- Singapore: P7M8 variant.
- South Korea: P7M13 variant. Used by the Korean National Police SWAT.
- United Arab Emirates: P7M13 variant.
- United States: Used by several police departments, including the New Jersey State Police (P7M8), Utah Highway Patrol, and the United States Park Police
- Uruguay: P7M8 variant.

== See also ==
- List of delayed-blowback firearms
- Arsenal P-M02—another pistol using the Barnitzke system
- Steyr GB—another pistol using the Barnitzke system
- Walther CCP-another pistol using the Barnitzke system

== Bibliography ==
- Woźniak, Ryszard (2001). Encyklopedia najnowszej broni palnej—tom 2 G-Ł (in Polish). Warsaw, Poland: Bellona. ISBN 83-11-09310-5.
