= Steyr GB =

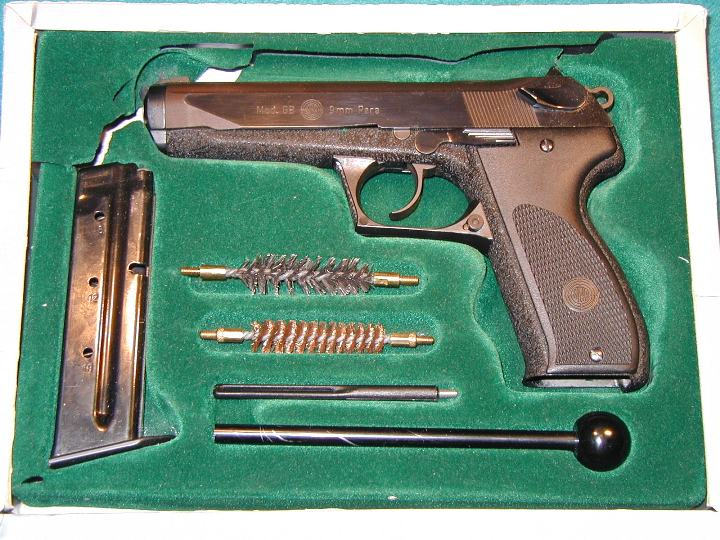
- Type: Semi-automatic pistol
- Place of origin: Austria

Service history
- Used by: See Users

Production history
- Designer: Hannes Kepplinger and Hermann Schweighofer
- Designed: 1968
- Manufacturer: LES, Inc., Steyr Mannlicher
- Produced: 1970s (Pi-18 samples), 1981–1988 (GB proper)
- No. built: LES, Inc.: 2,300; Steyr: 15,000–20,000
- Variants: Rogak (stainless steel), Steyr commercial and military (matte blue)

Specifications
- Mass: 845 g (unloaded); 1285 g (loaded)
- Length: 216 mm
- Barrel length: 136 mm
- Cartridge: 9×19mm Parabellum
- Action: Gas-delayed blowback
- Feed system: 18-round detachable box magazine

The Steyr GB is a double-action 9×19mm Parabellum caliber, large-framed semi-automatic pistol employing a gas-delayed blowback action. As such the GB abbreviation stands for Gasbremse (gas brake). It was designed in 1968, intended as a replacement for older handguns in Austrian military service.

The weapon went into general civilian production in 1982, and in 1988 production ceased.

In the late 1970s, an American company founded by Les Rogak, LES Incorporated of Morton Grove, Illinois marketed the Rogak P-18, a close derivative of the Austrian original, but without great commercial success, due to significantly lower manufacturing standards which affected both the appearance and function of the pistol.

Both weapons are now regarded as collector's items, the original (Steyr) model commanding higher prices in the American market.

== Operating mechanism ==
The Steyr GB is a semi-automatic, blowback-operated firearm. It features a unique gas-delayed blowback system based on the Barnitzke system, first used in the Volkssturmgewehr 1-5, and subsequently in the Swiss Pistole 47 W+F (Waffenfabrik Bern) prototype pistol. The Barnitzke system uses gas pressure from the ignited cartridge and feeds it through a small port in the barrel in front of the chamber to retard the rearward motion of the slide.

This is accomplished by using the fixed piston formed by the outside of the barrel inside a moving cylinder formed by the inside of the slide and gas pressure in the space between them opposing the rearward motion of the slide until the gas pressure has declined (at which point the bullet has left the muzzle) thereby allowing the slide to continue its rearward motion.

Thereafter the Steyr GB follows the conventional semi-automatic cycle: opening the breech; ejecting the empty cartridge case; stripping a new round from the magazine; loading a new cartridge; returning to battery (unless the magazine is empty).

Due to the Barnitzke System the Steyr GB has several heat related issues. These issues occur if the pistol isn't allowed to cool down long enough between each string of shots. The first problem is the heat transfer from the barrel to the slide release lever. The slide release lever gets hot to the point where it will burn the shooters left hand when shooting with 2 hands. The second problem is that the muzzle end of the barrel expands faster than the muzzle cap, which results in the shooter no longer being able to rack the slide and eventually will prevent the pistol from cycling.

== Development History of GB ==
At the end of the 1960s, Steyr-Daimler-Puch in Austria started re-examining the Barnitzke locking system and started a follow-up development. This led directly to the development of what would eventually become Steyr GB. The final patent specification from December 6, 1972 by the Steyr designer Hannes Kepplinger is based on the Barnitzke system, although this was significantly improved in terms of design.

The GB was designed as a full-size military sidearm with the goal of replacing the ageing Walther P38 and Colt P11 from the army stocks, as well as the Belgian FN M35 used by Austrian police. Even though there were no base specifications for the pistol, Steyr-Daimler-Puch - because of their relationship with Austrian armed forces - were well-informed of the properties that the army expected from a new service pistol. Thus, the company considered the pistol project as an “unofficial” development contract for the Austrian Armed Forces.

The original design introduced numerous novel features never before combined in a handgun: double-action mechanism (without safety); a gas-bleed delayed-blowback system; fixed barrel (that theoretically yields greater accuracy); polygonal rifling; and a reduced number of working parts.

During the development phase, the pistol was given the working designation "Pi 18", meant to refer to the magazine capacity of 18 rounds, which was above average for a handgun in the 1970s. When reintroduced in the 1980s, the name of the pistol was changed to the abbreviation "GB", from the term "GasBremse.“

The first working models were fielded by the Austrian armed forces in 1972. Although the military authorities were supportive of the pistol, the business negotiations fell short. The reason for this was due to Steyr simultaneously trying to market the MPi 69 submachine gun to the Austrian army, while also pushing the army to buy the stocks of Pi 18 alongside them. Steyr-Daimler-Puch and the Austrian army failed to reach an agreement and neither MPi 69 nor Pi 18 was purchased by the Austrian Army. This left both weapons in flux and discouraged Steyr from releasing the Pi 18 for the civilian market.

The pistol received a handful of modifications before being reintroduced in 1981. Its trigger guard was altered to a more jagged look, with redesigned controls such as safety and slide release, as well as a Sterling-style crinkle-finish on the pistol frame. This was to make the pistol more contemporary for the 1980s markets and to differentiate it from Rogak P18, which closely followed the appearance of the original Pi 18. In certain markets, the pistol is also referred to as "GB-80".

== Plagiarism, ROGAK/L.E.S. P-18 ==
In the mid-1970s, Steyr's then US representative Rogak acquired the production documents for "Pi-18", the pre-series/prototype of the Steyr GB, from an unidentified Steyr manager. How, precisely, this was achieved remains undetermined.

There was never an official licensing or related agreement for production between Rogak and Steyr. When asked about the matter by a trade journal in 1980, Steyr-Daimler-Puch said (quote) "at no time were there any agreements between Steyr and Rogak".

Rogak started production of the pistol in the USA around the late 1970s under the name of his "L.E.S. Rogak P-18“ and started to market it worldwide through its own sales companies. Owing to the performance data of the Austrian "Pi 18", Rogak saw very high market opportunities, which he intended to exploit as quickly as possible.

Rogak produced three slightly cosmetically different versions made of stainless steel. Rogak was either overwhelmed and/or unwilling to adequately follow the correct dimensions and/or get the required materials to make a product comparable to the original Austrian "Pi 18". As a result, these "quick-and-dirty P-18s" were manufactured in a way that was structurally inadequate in essential details. The general quality of workmanship can only be described as extremely poor compared to Steyr's own GB produced in the 1980s.

After releasing to a strongly negative reception, Steyr came to realize that Rogak P-18 would harm the reputation of their GB, which they were eyeing to launch in the American market. Steyr prepared a lawsuit against Rogak but it did not occur as Rogak ceased production of the pistol of its own volition. Roughly 2300 pistols were sold before production ceased in 1981.

== Reception and legacy ==
=== Rogak P-18 ===
At the time of its release, the Rogak P-18 was received highly negatively by both the reviewers of American firearms magazines and customers. Its substandard build and awful reliability earned it unflattering nicknames like "Jammatic" or "polished junk" by the American public.

It was one of the earliest "Wonder-nine" type of pistols in the civilian market. However, Rogak's innovation factor has been undermined because of its plagiarism of Steyr Pi-18/GB.

The Rogak P-18 became known as one of the worst semi-automatic pistols of all time. However, it remains a curiosity among firearm collectors.

=== Military contracts ===
Steyr GB was unsuccessful in acquiring major military contracts. Steyr's expectations of an Austrian military contract were upset with the victory of the Glock 17, which won military trials despite the novelty of its extensive employment of large high-strength polymer components, while the 1983 US military pistol competition, in which the Steyr GB competed, was won by the Beretta 92F. Consequently, Steyr decided to re-focus on the police and civilian market.

In the years that followed, Steyr received smaller international orders for military, paramilitary, and police special forces, including the special outfits in the USA, Lebanon and Pakistan. Well-known secret services were also interested in the GB, including the Ministry for State Security of the DDR, which procured around 100 pieces from the USA. The West German Federal Office for Defense Technology and Procurement (predecessor of Federal Office of Bundeswehr Equipment, Information Technology and In-Service Support) also bought 10 pieces. However, none of these smaller contracts were able to compensate for failing to procure the Austrian and US military contracts.

=== Legacy ===
While much appreciated by users trained in and familiar with the weapon, and well received by customers who understood the mechanism, which was intended to result in a robust, accurate, reliable, and functional weapon when used with standard military (full metal jacket) ammunition, the anticipated civilian sales remained low while major official (police) sales never materialized: between the American military's selection of the Beretta 92F, coupled with European military and police forces' selection of the competing SIG-Sauer (P226 full-size and P228 compact high-capacity pistols—the latter adopted by the US Army as the M11) led to a cessation of manufacture of the Steyr GB in November 25, 1988 after a total production of between 15,000 and 20,000 pistols—most of them commercial models.

In the firearms book Schützenwaffen (1945–1985), its collaborative writers arrive to the following conclusion about Steyr GB:

The case of "Steyr GB" shows that it is not just the performance that determines the success of a weapon. Time of launch, negative as well as positive side effects, political and economic context as well as inadequacies in marketing are more likely to determine whether a weapon is successful on the market or not.

Of the military models, 937 were exported to the United States.

== Users ==
- Lebanon: Police forces
- Pakistan: Police forces

== See also ==
- Arsenal P-M02—another pistol using the Barnitzke system
- Grossfuss Sturmgewehr—using the Horn system, more efficient than Barnitzke's
- Heckler & Koch P7—another pistol using the Barnitzke system
- Walther CCP—another pistol using the Barnitzke system
