= Krag–Jørgensen pistol =

Krags forsøkspistol
- Type: Semi automatic pistol
- Place of origin: Norway

Production history
- Designer: Ole Herman Johannes Krag
- Designed: 1889

Specifications
- Cartridge: 9×19mm Parabellum
- Caliber: 9mm

The Krag–Jørgensen pistol is a semi-automatic pistol of Norwegian origin. The weapon is from the same maker of the bolt-action rifles.

== See also ==
- List of delayed-blowback firearms
