= Schüler Reform =

German harmonica pistol

The Reform Pistole, better known today as the Schüler Reform, is a .25 ACP pistol designed by August Schüler, patented in 1904. It was produced between 1907 and 1914 at his factory in Suhl, August Schüler Waffenfabrik, as well as some licensed production at other factories. It is sometimes known as the Breveté, due to stamping on the magazine referring to "patented", or D.R.P 177023, its patent number.

The Reform is a unique attempt to reduce the bulk of a traditional double-action revolver. It replaces the cylinder with a magazine-like block of four chambers and barrels arranged vertically. Each barrel holds one cartridge, and the entire assembly is slid down into the frame of the pistol, not unlike the clip seen on a top-load bolt action rifle or the chamber block of a harmonica gun. When loading the magazine, the uppermost barrel stops slightly below the hammer. The friction provided by a small spring-loaded stud at the bottom rear of the magazine prevents it from falling out of the gun.

Connected to the trigger is a lever that moves upward when the trigger is pulled. The lever engages a rack-like series of indentations on the back of the magazine that raises the magazine so that the next barrel to fire is moved in line with the hammer. The mechanism is similar to the action used by most revolvers to spin the cylinder one position. At the end of the trigger pull the hammer is released and fires that round.

The lower three barrels have a small hole drilled into the barrel above them. When any of these were fired, gas from the round is ported into the barrel above, ejecting the cartridge case rearward. The hammer has a large extension on the top that deflects the shell away from the user's face. Because the bottom-most barrel has no next round to eject it, that shell must be removed manually. A notch on the top of the magazine aids in removing it upward by pinching the notches with the forefinger and thumb.
