= Barnitzke machine gun =

- Type: Machine gun
- Place of origin: Nazi Germany

Specifications
- Cartridge: 7.92×57mm
- Caliber: 7.92mm
- Action: delayed blowback
- Feed system: Belt
- Sights: Iron

Rack and pinion detail.

The Barnitzke machine gun is a prototype machine gun of late World War II German origin. The weapon uses an unusual delayed blowback operation, where during firing the bolt opening is delayed by the rotational inertia of two flywheels, which are driven by a rack and pinion arrangement on the bolt carrier.

== See also ==
- List of World War II firearms of Germany
- MG 42, successor
- MG 81 machine gun
- MGD PM-9, an SMG with a flywheel delay
