= Action (firearms) =

Functional mechanism of breech-loading

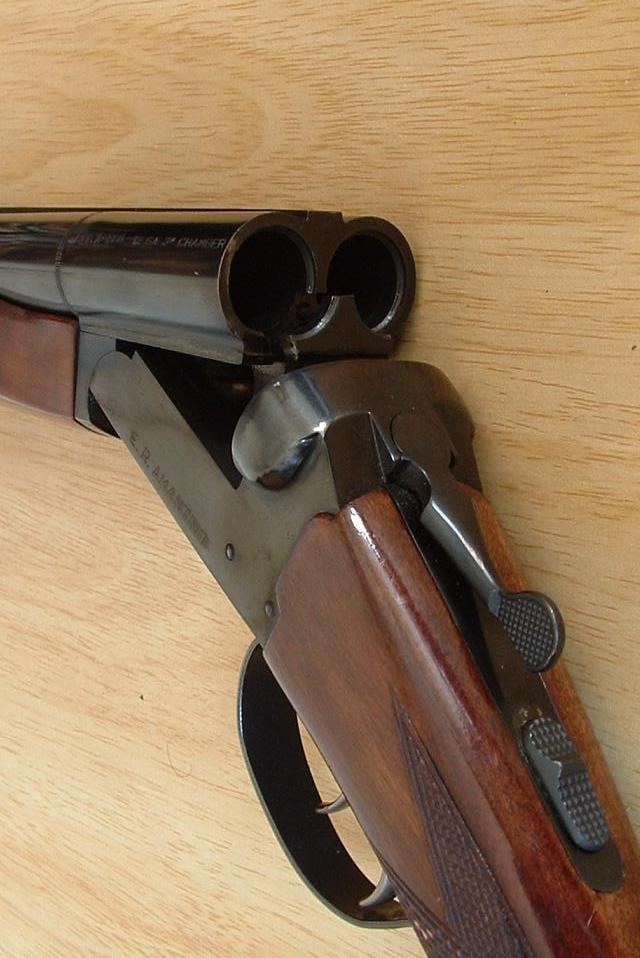
A view of the break-action of a typical double-barreled shotgun, with the action open and the extractor visible. The opening lever and the safety catch are clearly visible.

In firearms technology, an action is the functional mechanism of a breechloading firearm that handles (loads, locks, fires, extracts, and ejects) the ammunition cartridges, or the method by which that mechanism works.

Actions can be categorized in several ways, including single action versus double action, break action versus lever-action, pump-action, bolt-action, among many other types. The term action can also include short, long, and magnum if it is in reference to the length of the rifle's receiver and the length of the bolt. The short action rifle usually can accommodate a cartridge length of 2.8 in (71 mm) or smaller. The long action rifle can accommodate a cartridge of 3.34 in (85 mm), and the magnum action rifle can accommodate cartridges of 3.6 in (91 mm).

Actions are technically not present on muzzleloaders, as all those are single-shot firearms with a closed off breech with the powder and projectile manually loaded from the muzzle. Instead, the muzzleloader ignition mechanism is referred to as the lock (e.g. matchlock, wheellock, flintlock, and caplock).

== Single-shot actions ==
Single-shot actions operate only to ignite a cartridge that is separately set up ("in battery") for firing, and are incapable of moving the cartridge, itself. As the name implies, all single-shot firearms (unless they are multi-barreled) can only hold one round of ammunition and need to be manually reloaded after every firing. Historically, these are the earliest cartridge firearm actions invented.

=== Breechblock ===
Diagram of various "block" firearm actions

==== Dropping block ====
The dropping block are actions wherein the breechblock lowers or "drops" into the receiver to open the breech, usually actuated by an underlever. There are two principal types of dropping block: the tilting block and the falling block.

==== Pivoting block ====
In a tilting block or pivoting block action, the breechblock is hinged on a pin mounted at the rear (in contrast with tilting bolt, which is not hinged). When the lever is operated, the block tilts down and forward, exposing the chamber. The best-known pivoting block designs are the Peabody, the Peabody–Martini, and Ballard actions.

The original Peabody rifles, manufactured by the Providence Tool Company, used a manually cocked side-hammer. Swiss gunsmith Friedrich Martini developed a pivoting block action by modifying the Peabody, which incorporated a hammerless striker that was cocked by the operating lever with the same single efficient motion that also pivoted the block. The 1871 Martini–Henry which replaced the "trapdoor" Snider–Enfield was the standard British Army rifle of the later Victorian era, and the Martini is also a popular action for civilian rifles.

Charles H. Ballard's self-cocking tilting-block action was produced by the Marlin Firearms Company from 1875 and earned a reputation among long-range "Creedmoor" target shooters. Surviving Marlin Ballards are today highly prized by collectors, especially those mounted in the elaborate Swiss-style Schützen stocks of the day.

==== Falling block ====
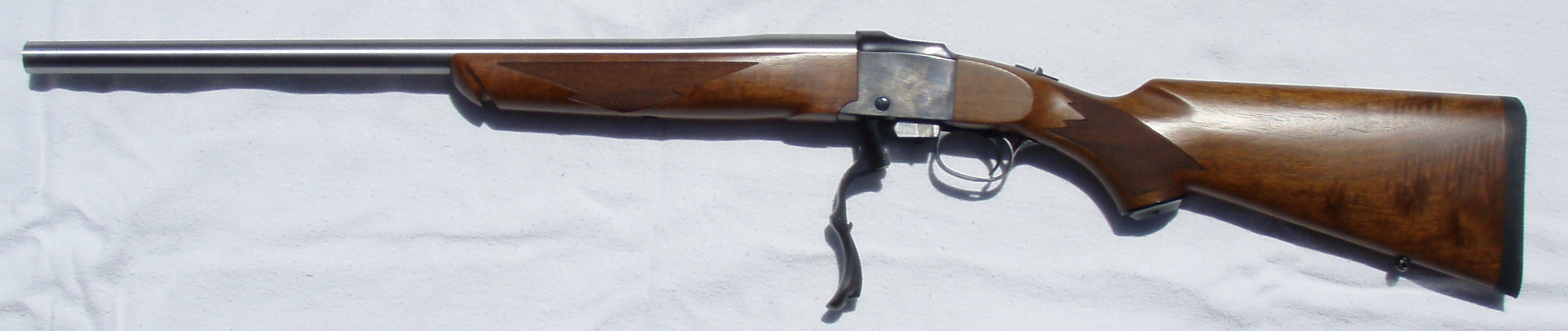
Ruger No. 1 single-shot falling-block rifle with action open

In a falling block or sliding block action, a solid metal breechblock "slides" vertically in grooves cut into the breech of the firearm and actuated by a lever. Examples of firearms using the falling-block action are the Sharps rifle and Ruger No. 1.

==== Rolling block ====
In a rolling block action, the breechblock takes the form of a part-cylinder, with a pivot pin through its axis. The operator rotates or "rolls" the block to open and close the breech; it is a simple, rugged, and reliable design. Rolling blocks are most often associated with firearms made by Remington in the late 19th century; in the Remington action the hammer serves to lock the breech closed at the moment of firing, and the block in turn prevents the hammer from falling with the breech open.

==== Hinged block ====
The hinged block used in the earliest metallic-cartridge breechloaders designed for general military issue began as conversions of muzzle-loading rifle-muskets. The upper rear portion of the barrel was filed or milled away and replaced by a hinged breechblock, which opened upward to permit loading. An internal angled firing pin allowed the re-use of the rifle's existing side-hammer. The Allin action made by Springfield Arsenal in the US hinged forward; the Snider–Enfield used by the British opened to the side. Whereas the British quickly replaced the Snider with a dropping-block Peabody-style Martini action, the US Army felt the trapdoor action to be adequate and followed its muzzleloader conversions with the new-production Springfield Model 1873, which was the principal longarm used as a weapon in the Indian Wars and was still in service with some units in the Spanish–American War.

=== Break action ===
A break action is a type of firearm where the barrel(s) are hinged and can be "broken open" to expose the breech. Multi-barrel break action firearms are usually subdivided into over-and-under or side-by-side configurations for two barrel configurations or "combination gun" when mixed rifle and shotgun barrels are used.

=== Bolt action ===
In bolt-action firearms, the opening and closing of the breech is operated by direct manual manipulation of the bolt via a protruding bolt handle.

The first general-issue military breechloader was a single-shot bolt action: the paper-cartridge Prussian needle gun of 1841. France countered in 1866 with its superior Chassepot rifle, also a paper-cartridge bolt action. The first metallic-cartridge bolt actions in general military service were the Berdan Type II introduced by Russia in 1870, the Mauser Model 1871, and a modified Chassepot, the Gras rifle of 1874; all these were single-shots.

Single-shot bolt actions in .22 caliber were also widely manufactured as inexpensive "boys' guns" in the earlier 20th century; and there have been a few single-shot bolt-action shotguns, usually in .410 bore. Today, most top-level smallbore match rifles are single-shot bolt action rifles.

=== Eccentric screw action ===
The eccentric screw action first seen on the M1867 Werndl–Holub and later on the Magnum Research Lone Eagle pistol, the breech closure is a rotating drum with the same axis, but offset from the bore. When locked, a firing pin aligns with the primer, the breech is otherwise solid. When rotated open, a slot in the drum is exposed for extraction and feeding of a new round. Though first used on the Werndl-Holub, this action is commonly known as a cannon breech due to its association with the French 75mm Model of 1897 cannon. The French M1897 was, itself, based on William Hubbell's U.S. patent 149,478.

=== Other single-shot actions ===
- The Ferguson rifle: British Major Patrick Ferguson designed his rifle, considered to be the first military breechloader in the 1770s. A plug-shaped breechblock was screw-threaded so that rotating the handle underneath would lower and raise it for loading with ball and loose powder; the flintlock action still required conventional priming.
- The Hall rifle: First U.S. cavalry breechloader, originally made in flint but later made-in and converted to percussion in 1830s–1840s. The breech section tilts up to accept a paper cartridge. Excellent machine-made construction, but still tended to leak gas at the breech.
- The Kammerlader: A crank-operated Norwegian firearm produced around the time of the Prussian Needle-gun. Originally used a paper cartridge. Later, many were converted to rimfire; this was the first Norwegian breechloader.
- The Tarpley carbine: This is categorized into falling block action, but the breech block is hinged, unlike the others.
- The Morse Carbine: This mostly brass action is somewhat like the Hall rifle, except it was designed to take a special centerfire cartridge. Very few of these were actually made; all were constructed in the late 1850s.
- The Joslyn rifle:
- Rising Breech Carbine:

== Repeating actions ==
Repeating actions are characterized by reciprocating/rotating components that can move cartridges in and out of battery from an ammunition-holding device (which is a magazine, cylinder, or belt), which allows the gun to hold multiple rounds and shoot repeatedly before needing a manual ammunition reload.

=== Manual operation ===
==== Revolver ====
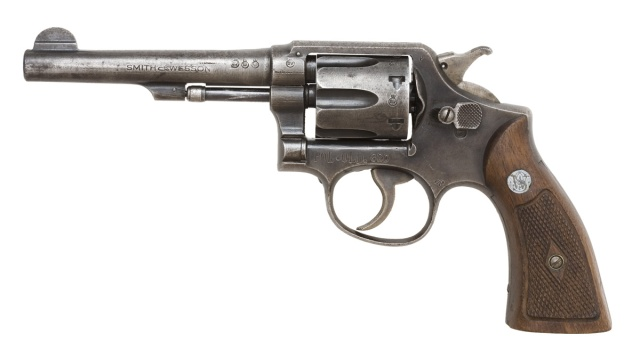
Smith & Wesson M&P revolver

A revolver is a multi-chamber (but single-barrelled) firearm that houses cartridges in a rotary cylinder which indexes each round into alignment with the bore (with the help of a forcing cone) prior to each shot. Revolvers are most often handguns; however, examples of revolving rifles, shotguns, and cannons have been made. The cylinder is most often rotated via linkage to a manually manipulated external hammer, although some revolvers are "double-action" and can use the manual pull of the trigger to drive both the cylinder rotation and hammer cocking. Some examples of firearms using the revolver principle are the Smith & Wesson Model 3 and Colt Model 1889.

==== Bolt action ====
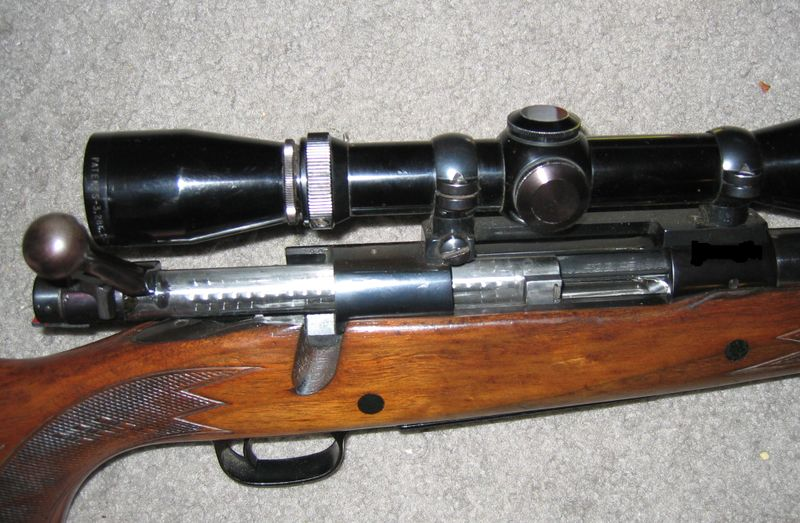
Barreled action for bolt-action rifle

===== Rotating-bolt action =====
Most bolt-actions utilize a rotating bolt ("turn-pull") design, where the bolt handle must be rotated upwards for unlocking before the bolt can be pulled back to opening the breech and eject any spent cartridge, and must be rotated back down for locking after the bolt closes the breech. The three predominant rotating bolt-action systems are the Mauser, Lee–Enfield, and Mosin–Nagant systems, with the Mauser system emerging into the mainstream as the most widely used rotating bolt-action design.

===== Straight-pull action =====
There are also straight pull bolt-action systems that use complex bolt head designs to facilitate locking instead of needing to rotate the bolt handle every time.

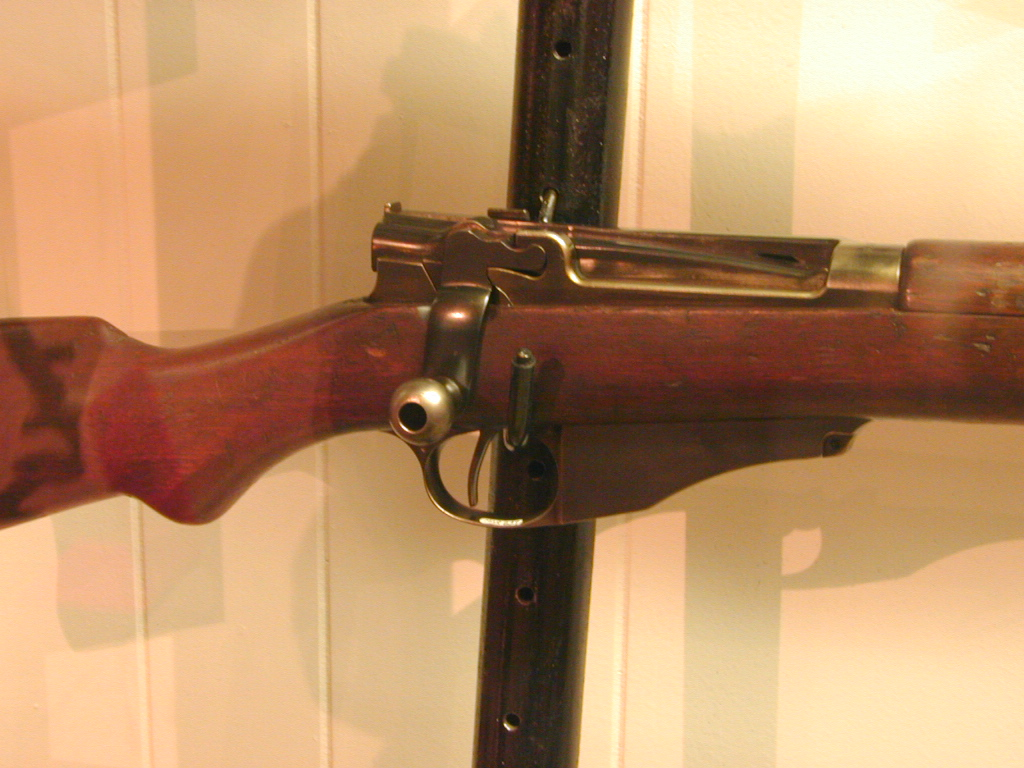
U.S. M1895 Lee Navy straight-pull rifle

In the Mauser-style turn-bolt action, the bolt handle must be rotated upward, pull rearward, pushed forward, and finally rotated back downward into lock. In a straight pull bolt-action, the bolt can be cycled without rotating, hence reducing the required range of motion by the shooter from four movements to two, with the goal of increasing the rate of fire. The Ross and Schmidt–Rubin rifles load via stripper clips, albeit of an unusual paperboard and steel design in the Schmidt–Rubin rifle, while the Mannlicher uses en-bloc clips. The Schmidt–Rubin series, which culminated in the K31, are also known for being among the most accurate military service rifles ever made. Yet another variant of the straight pull bolt-action, of which the M1895 Lee Navy is an example, is a camming action in which pulling the bolt handle causes the bolt to rock, freeing a stud from the receiver and unlocking the bolt.

In 1993, the German firearms company Blaser, introduced the Blaser R93, a new straight pull bolt-action rifle where locking is achieved by a series of concentric "claws" that protrude/retract from the bolthead, a design that is referred to as Radialbundverschluss ("radial connection"). As of 2017 the Rifle Shooter magazine listed its successor Blaser R8 as one of the three most popular straight pull bolt-action together with Merkel Helix and Browning Maral. Some other notable modern straight pull bolt-action rifles are made by Chapuis, Heym, Lynx, Rößler, Strasser, and Steel Action.

In the sport of biathlon, because shooting speed is an important performance factor and semi-automatic guns are illegal for race use, straight pull bolt-actions are quite common, and are used almost exclusively on the Biathlon World Cup. The first company to make straight pull bolt-actions for .22 caliber was J. G. Anschütz; the action is specifically the straight-pull ball bearing-lock action, which features spring-loaded ball bearings on the side of the bolt which lock into a groove inside the bolt's housing. With the new design came a new dry-fire method; instead of the bolt being turned up slightly, the action is locked back to catch the firing pin.

==== Pump action ====
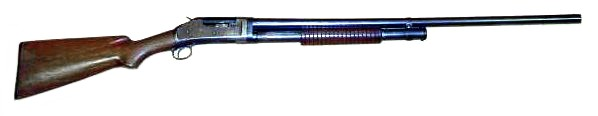
A Winchester M1897, one of the first successful pump-action shotgun designs

In pump-action firearms, a sliding grip at the fore-end beneath the barrel is manually operated by the user to eject and chamber cartridges. Pump actions are predominantly found in shotguns. Some examples of firearms using the pump-action are the Winchester Model 1912, Remington 870, and Mossberg 500.

==== Lever action ====
The lever-action firearms, a linked lever is manually operated to eject and chamber cartridges. Some examples of firearms using lever-action are the Henry Model 1860, Winchester Model 1876, and Marlin Model 1894.

==== Bolt release action ====
The bolt release or lever release action is a hybrid repeating action that uses the physical manipulation of a bolt release lever/button to complete the cartridge chambering process. However, unlike the lever action (which demands the shooter's hand to actually provide the force needed for cycling the action), bolt release firearms eject the used cartridge automatically without involving the lever, usually via blowback or gas operation, and often uses a spring-assisted mechanism to chamber the next round. However, after moving rearwards the bolt is stopped by a bolt catch and will not move back into battery position and chamber the new round, until the user manually disengages the catch by depressing a release lever/button. Due to the fact that the action can not complete its loading cycle without manual input from the user, it is technically a manually operated action rather than a self-loading one.

Whilst the basic principle can be traced back to other self-ejecting rifles, such as the single-shot Harrington & Richardson Model 755 rifle, this action has since been popularized in the United Kingdom by Southern Gun Company, who manufacture with "Manually Actuated Release System" (MARS) action rifles/pistol-caliber carbines in .223, .308, 9mm and .45 ACP calibers, as the interrupted mechanism complies with The Firearms (Amendment) Act 1988 which bans possession of self-loading centrefire rifles. The French company Verney-Carron makes and exports the Speedline hunting rifle and the Véloce shotgun, which has caused some moral concern in the mainstream media in Australia due to lobbying by the Greens and anti-gun groups such as Gun Control Australia, with David Shoebridge quoting the term "semi-semi-automatic". Similarly, Savage Arms has introduced the A17R and A22R rimfire rifles (both modified from its new A-series rifles, with a bolt release lever in front of the trigger guard), aiming at the Australian market, but law enforcement agencies such as the Northern Territory Police has attempted to unilaterally defining these rifles as "linear repeating firearms with assisted ejection" and reclassify them as semi-automatic, and hence prohibited without at least a Category C license, which is off-limit to most urban and rural residents who do not own farms. In 2020, CZ also introduced CZ 515, a bolt-release modified version of the CZ 512, to the Australian market via its importer Winchester Australia. The Turkish manufacturer Pardus Arms also produces the 12 gauge-caliber BRS17 shotgun, which uses a bolt release button on the back of the receiver to chamber rounds before firing.

==== Other repeating manual actions ====
- Rotary cannon: Gatling gun, M134 Minigun
- Chain gun: AAI In-Line, Hughes Chain Gun, Guycot Chain Rifle, Treeby chain gun
- Kalthoff repeater
- Cookson repeater
- Belton flintlock
- The Jennings Magazine Rifle
- Meigs Sliding Guard Action Repeater
- Roper repeater
- The Orvill Robinson Model 2 rifle: Orvill Robinson, a New York-based firearms designer, developed two rifles. His first, patented in 1870 and commonly referred to by collectors as the "Model 1" though it has no official designation, was a precursor to straight pull bolt-actions like the Mannlicher M1886. The second rifle designed by Robinson, patented in 1872, was very different, employing a double hinged action that folded upward from the receiver to remove the spent casing and back down and forward to chamber a new round. Though hammer-fired, it is recognizable as a manually actuated ancestor of the toggle action found in firearms such as the Luger Parabellum 1908 pistol or Pedersen Rifle.
- Krag-Petersson Rifle Though frequently classified as only single-shot firearms, one tilting block rifle usually falls under the category of repeating firearms. The user, upon ejecting a round from the chamber, would load a round from the underbarrel magazine onto the loading surface of the tilting block, then raise it to the mouth of the chamber where the user could then easily push it forward into the chamber. Though this would not meet most standards of "repeating" for most modern users, the classification has been in use historically.
- Remington-Rider Magazine Pistol has a manually actuated rolling block action to pull a cartridge from a tubular magazine set below the barrel and simultaneously cock the firearm. The block was rolled back into battery, loading the cartridge into the chamber, by spring pressure while the hammer remained in the cocked position.

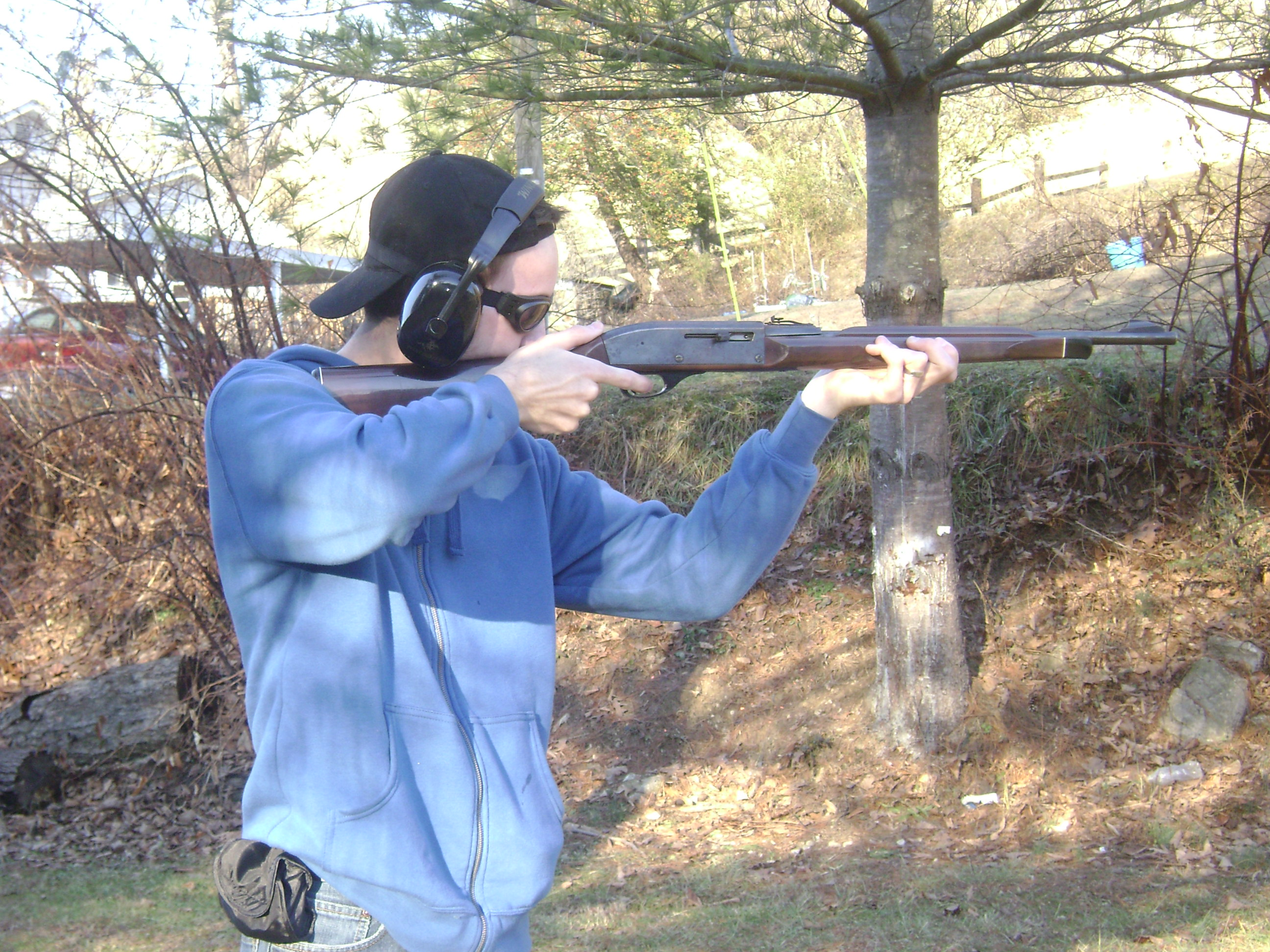
Remington Nylon 66 .22 Rimfire semi-automatic rifle

=== Autoloading operation ===
Schematic of automatic firearm operations

==== Blowback operation ====
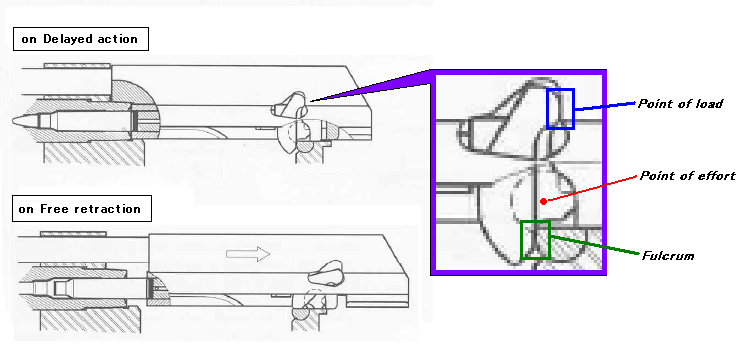
A schematic of the lever-delayed blowback mechanism used in the FAMAS assault rifle

The blowback operation is a system in which semi-automatic and fully automatic firearms operate through the energy created by combustion in the chamber and bore acting directly on the bolt face through the cartridge. In blowback operation the bolt is not locked to the chamber, relying only on spring pressure and inertia from the weight of the bolt to keep the action from opening too quickly. Blowback operation is used for low-powered cartridges due to the weight of the bolt required.

Delayed blowback actions use some mechanism to slow down rearward travel of the bolt, allowing this action to handle more powerful ammunition and/or reduced weight of the bolt.

===== Examples of blowback operation =====
- Simple blowback: Halcón M-1943, Uzi submachine gun, Varan PMX-80
- Advanced primer ignition: Becker Type M2, Oerlikon 20 mm, Mk 19 grenade launcher, Atchisson AA-12, QLU-11 (LG5)
- Lever-delayed blowback: FAMAS, Sterling 7.62, AA-52, 2B-A-40, TKB-517
- Radial-delayed blowback: CMMG MkG
- Roller-delayed blowback: SIG 510, HK MP5, HK P9, HK G3
- Gas-delayed blowback: Volkssturmgewehr 1-5, HK P7, Steyr GB
- Primer-actuated unlocking: Garand Model 1919, Postnikov APT, Springfield 1903 primer-actuated rifle and Clarke carbine
- Toggle-delayed blowback: Schwarzlose MG M.07/12, Luger rifle and Pedersen rifle
- Screw-delayed blowback: Salvator-Dormus M1893 & Demro TAC-1 (Helical screw), Sheppard automatic rifle and Thompson Autorifle (Turnbolt)
- Blish Lock: early Thompson submachine guns
- Hesitation locked: Remington Model 51 and R51 pistols, M50 Reising, SIG MKMO and Rudd Arms AR-180
- Flywheel-delayed blowback: Barnitzke machine gun, Kazachok SMG, and MGD PM-9
- Detent-delayed blowback: Show Low Manufacturing Black-Jack
- Chamber-ring delayed blowback: Seecamp pistol
- Pneumatic-delay: Suomi KP/-31 and Moore submachine gun

==== Blow-forward operation ====
The blow-forward operation uses a fixed breech and moving barrel that is forced forward relative to the breech by the friction of the projectile against the bore as well as the breech recoiling away from the barrel. The barrel is spring loaded and returns automatically to chamber a fresh round from the magazine. Examples of this action are the Steyr Mannlicher M1894, Hino Komuro M1908 Pistol and the Schwarzlose Model 1908.

==== Recoil operation ====
The recoil operation is a type of locked-breech action used in semi-automatic and fully automatic firearms. It also uses energy from the combustion in the chamber acting directly on the bolt through the cartridge head, but in this case the firearm has a reciprocating barrel and breech assembly, combined with a bolt that locks to the breech. The breech remains locked as the bolt and barrel travel rearward together for some distance, allowing pressure in the chamber to drop to a safe level before the breech is opened.

===== Examples of recoil operation =====
- Short-recoil: Colt M1911, MAB PA-15, Browning Hi-Power, HK USP, Glock, Mamba Pistol, M2 Browning machine gun, MG42, Vz 52 pistol, Revol Arms DL45, M82
- Long-recoil: Browning Auto 5, Femaru STOP Pistol, Mars Automatic Pistol, Chauchat
- Inertia: Sjögren Inertial, certain Benelli shotguns

==== Gas operation ====
Direct impingement

Fluted chamber direct impingement

The gas operation is a system of operation mechanism used to provide energy to semi-automatic and fully automatic firearms. In gas-operation, a portion of high pressure gas from the cartridge being fired is tapped through a hole in the barrel and diverted to operate the action. There are three basic types: long stroke gas piston (where the gas piston goes the same distance as the operating stroke of the action parts, and is often attached to the action parts), short stroke gas piston (where the gas piston travels a shorter distance than the operating stroke of the action parts), and direct impingement (AKA "direct gas", "gas impingement", where there is no piston, and the gas acts directly on the action parts). A fourth type, now considered obsolete and ineffective, are those systems based on the Bang rifle that utilize a muzzle cap to capture gas after the bullet has left the barrel. While this system is successful in boosting the operating power of recoil operated guns, it is insufficient and too susceptible to fouling for use as the primary operating system.

===== Examples of gas operation =====
- Short-stroke gas piston: FN FAL, SAR-87, HK G36
- Long-stroke gas piston: M1 Garand, AK-47, FN FNC
- Direct impingement: MAS 49, M16, AG-42
- Gas trap: Gewehr 41, Bang M1922 rifle

== See also ==
- Locked-breech
- Lock (firearm)
  - Matchlock
  - Wheellock
  - Flintlock
  - Caplock
- Trigger
