= SIG MKMO =

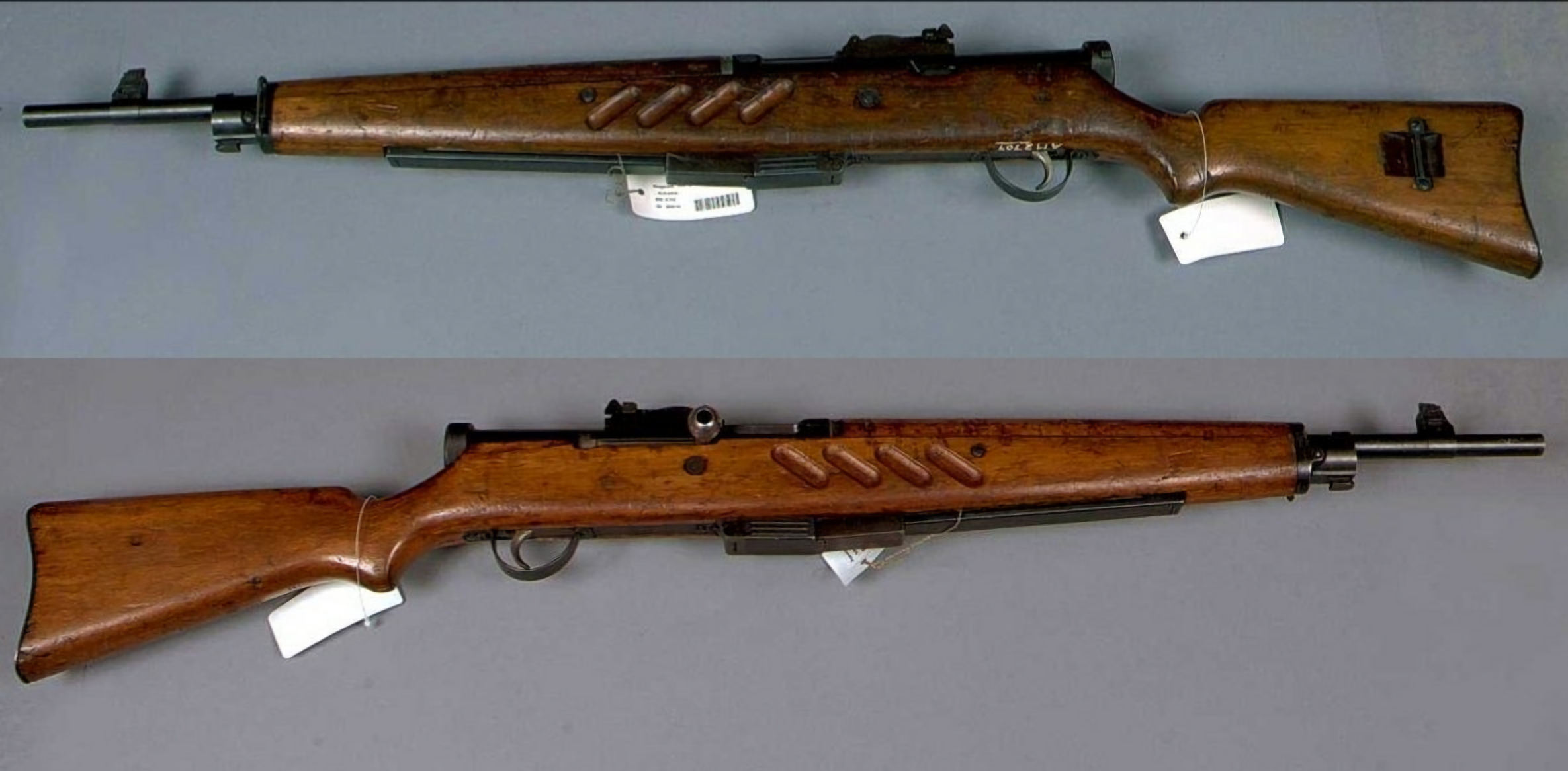
- SIG MKMS used by Finnish Army from The Swedish Army Museum)
- Type: Submachine gun
- Place of origin: Switzerland

Service history
- Wars: World War II

Production history
- Designer: Gotthard End
- Designed: 1930
- Manufacturer: Schweizerische Industrie-Gesellschaft (SIG)
- Produced: 1933–1941
- No. built: 1,228

Specifications (SIG MKMO)
- Mass: 4.25 kg (9.4 lb); 3.7 kg (8.2 lb) (MKPS)
- Length: 1,025 mm (40.4 in); 820 mm (32.3 in) (MKPS)
- Barrel length: 500 mm (19.7 in); 300 mm (11.8 in) (MKPS)
- Cartridge: 9×25mm Mauser, 7.63×25mm Mauser, 7.65×21mm Parabellum, 9×19mm Parabellum
- Action: Hesitation-Lock (MKMO/MKPO); Straight Blowback (MKMS/MKPS)
- Rate of fire: 850rpm
- Muzzle velocity: 500 m/s (1,640 ft/s) (9mm Mauser Export)
- Feed system: 40-round detachable box magazine 30-round detachable (MKPS)

The SIG MKMO is a submachine gun produced by Schweizerische Industrie Gesellschaft (SIG) company in Neuhausen from 1933 to 1937. The MKMO – M = Maschinen, K = Karabiner M = Militär, O = Oben (Top ejection) – was designed for the military and to increase firepower it had a larger-capacity magazine as well as a longer barrel. Only 1,228 of these guns were produced. It saw limited adoption by Swiss police departments and the Swiss Guard at the Vatican. Finland purchased 282 of the MKMS variant, which were used by the home guard, supply units and coastal defense forces in the Continuation War.

== Design ==
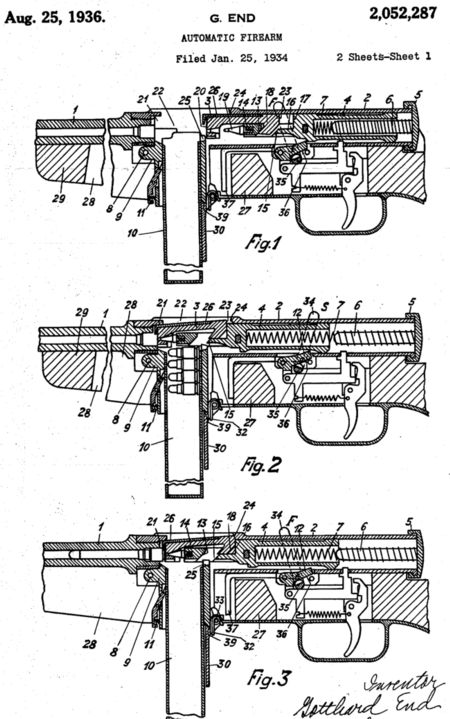
SIG MKMO, patent drawing

The SIG MKMO used a hesitation-locked operating system which kept the cartridge within the chamber long enough for the pressure within the barrel to decrease to a safe level. This system was adapted by Gotthard End based on a John Pedersen design first used in the Remington Model 51 pistol. It was also the first personal weapon to have a folding magazine well so that the magazine and mag well could be pivoted horizontally and stored within the wooden fore-stock. This made transportation during non-combat movement easy and much less difficult compared to traditional magazine wells. A simple catch system would release the magazine allowing for quick deployment.

The locked-breech blowback system mirrored that of John Pedersen's Remington Model 51 only with a locking recess above rather than below the bolt. When the firearm is in battery, the breech block rests slightly forward of the locking shoulder in the frame. When the cartridge is fired, the breech block and bolt carrier move together a short distance rearward powered by the energy of the cartridge as in a standard blowback system. When the breech block contacts the locking shoulder, it stops, locking the breech. The bolt carrier continues rearward with the momentum it acquired in the initial phase. This delay allows chamber pressure to drop to safe levels while the breech is locked and the cartridge slightly extracted. Once the bullet leaves the barrel and pressure drops, the continuing motion of the bolt carrier cams the breech block from its locking recess, continuing the operating cycle.

There was no fire selector switch for single or automatic fire. This was gauged by the force of pull on the trigger: a short pull was for single shot, and a long pull was for automatic fire. This was also one of the first sub-machine guns that had an integral dust cover on the magazine housing. The sights for both the MKMO and MKPO were both fully manually adjustable but could be calibrated from 100m to an optimistic 1000m. This led to much confusion with accuracy often found wanting in young soldiers who could not operate the sights properly.

== Variants ==
There were 2 variants of the MKMO. There was the shortened barreled (300 mm) MKPO (P for Police), which still used the two-part hesitation-locked action. This was designed for the police market. In 1937, SIG introduced the simplified MKMS and MKPS (S for Seitlich, side ejection of the empty shell). These versions did away with the Pedersen hesitation lock and operated on the straight blowback system firing from an open bolt. The MKMO, MKPO, MKMS and MKPS submachine guns were still priced high and sales were slow. Production was stopped in 1941.

== Users ==
- Switzerland: Sixty of the MKPS, Serial No. 3321–3380, chambered for 7.65mm Parabellum were shipped to the Swiss Army in 1940, many others used by primarily by Police forces.
  - Pontifical Swiss guard
- Finland: Finland purchased 282 of the MKMS variant in both 9x19 and 7.65 Parabellum during the Winter war, but arrived to late for it, so were used by the home guard, supply units and coastal defense forces in the Continuation War.
- Mengjiang
- Kingdom of Hungary (1920–1946): At least 1 or a few more MKMS probably for trials in 1938.
- Costa Rica: A few pictures from the 1948 civil war and its aftermath show some MKPS.

== See also ==
- List of delayed blowback firearms
- 701 rifle
- Remington Model 51
- Remington R51
- SIG MP41
- SIG MP-48
- Danuvia 39M/43M
