= R51 =

R51 may refer to:

- R51 (South Africa), a road
- HMS Chevron (R51), a destroyer of the Royal Navy
- HMS Perseus (R51), an aircraft carrier of the Royal Navy
- Nissan Pathfinder (R51), a sport utility vehicle
- R51: Toxic to aquatic organisms, a risk phrase
- Remington R51, a semi-automatic pistol
