= SKS =

Soviet semi-automatic carbine

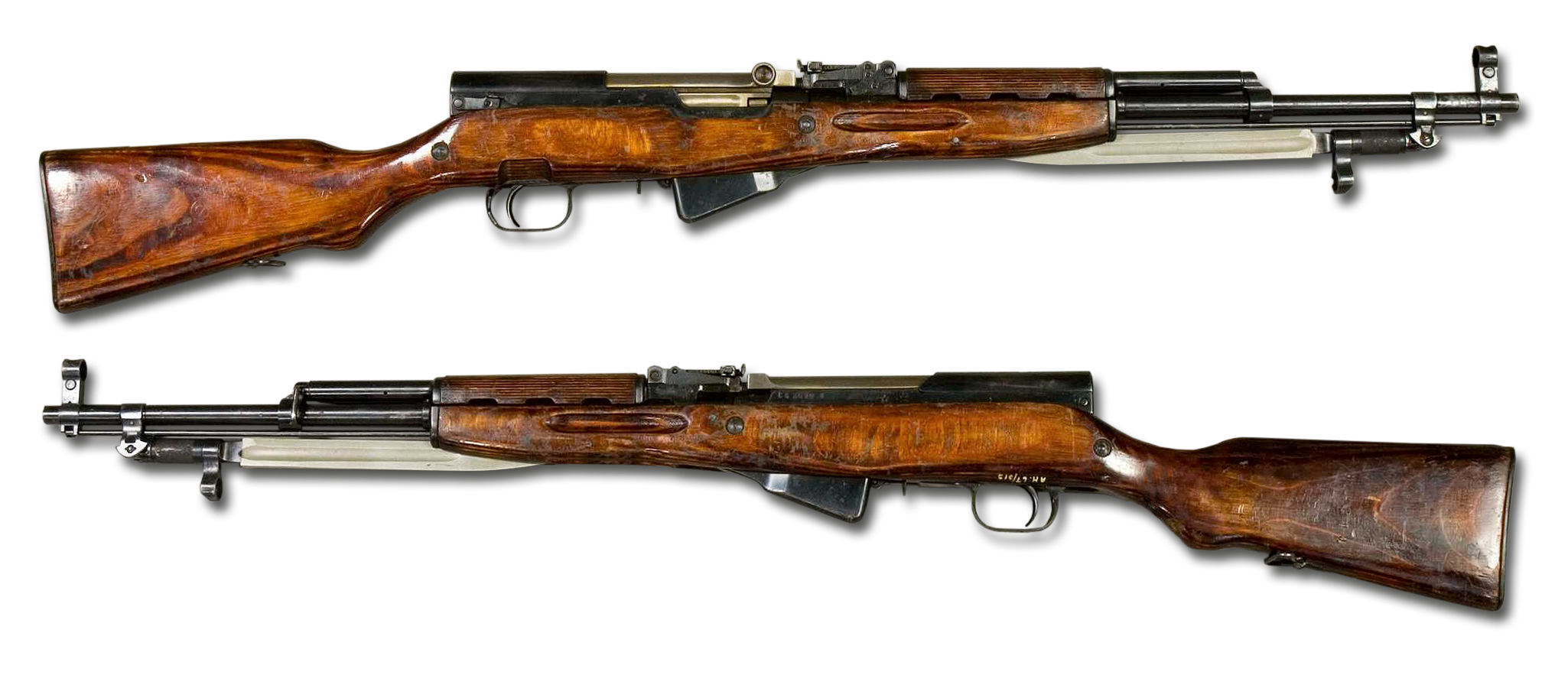
- A Russian variant SKS from the collections of the Swedish Army Museum
- Type: Semi-automatic carbine
- Place of origin: Soviet Union

Service history
- In service: 1949–present
- Used by: See Users
- Wars: See Conflicts

Production history
- Designer: Sergei Gavrilovich Simonov
- Designed: 1941–1944
- Produced: 1949–1958 (Soviet Union); 1956–1980 (China)
- No. built: 5,000,000–15,000,000
- Variants: See Variants

Specifications
- Mass: 3.85 kg (8.5 lb)
- Length: 1.021 m (40.2 in) (with bayonet folded)
- Barrel length: 521 mm (20.5 in)
- Cartridge: 7.62×39mm
- Action: Gas-operated (short-stroke, tilting bolt)
- Rate of fire: 35–40 rounds/min
- Muzzle velocity: 735 m/s (2,410 ft/s)
- Effective firing range: 400 m (440 yd)
- Feed system: 10-round fixed magazine fed by a stripper clip
- Sights: Iron sights graduated from 100 to 1,000 meters

The SKS (Russian: Самозарядный карабин Симонова, СКС, romanized: Samozaryadny karabin Simonova, lit. 'Simonov self-loading carbine') is a semi-automatic carbine designed by Soviet small arms designer Sergei Gavrilovich Simonov in the 1940s.

The SKS was first produced in the Soviet Union but was later widely exported and manufactured by various nations. Its distinguishing characteristics include a permanently attached folding bayonet and a hinged, fixed magazine. As the SKS lacked select-fire capability and its magazine was limited to ten rounds, it was rendered obsolete in the Eastern Bloc by the introduction of the AK-47 series of rifles in the 1950s. Nevertheless, SKS carbines continued to see service with the Soviet Border Troops and second-line and reserve army units for decades.

The SKS was manufactured at Tula Arsenal from 1949 to 1958, and at the Izhevsk Arsenal from 1953 to 1954. Altogether, the Soviet Union produced 2.7 million SKS carbines. Throughout the Cold War, millions of additional SKS carbines and their derivatives were also manufactured under license in the People's Republic of China, as well as a number of countries allied with the Eastern Bloc. The SKS was exported in vast quantities and found favour with insurgent forces around the world as a utilitarian weapon which was adequate for guerrilla warfare despite its limitations.

Beginning in 1988, millions have also been sold on the civilian market in Canada and the United States, where they remain popular as hunting and sporting rifles.

== Design ==
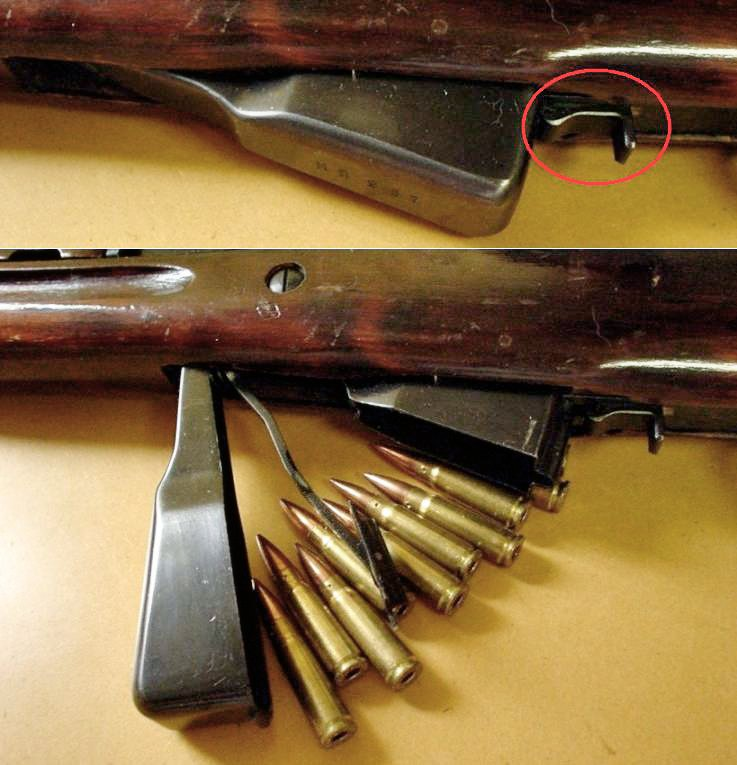
SKS with the magazine closed (top) and open. The magazine release is circled. The release gets pulled back to open the built-in magazine.

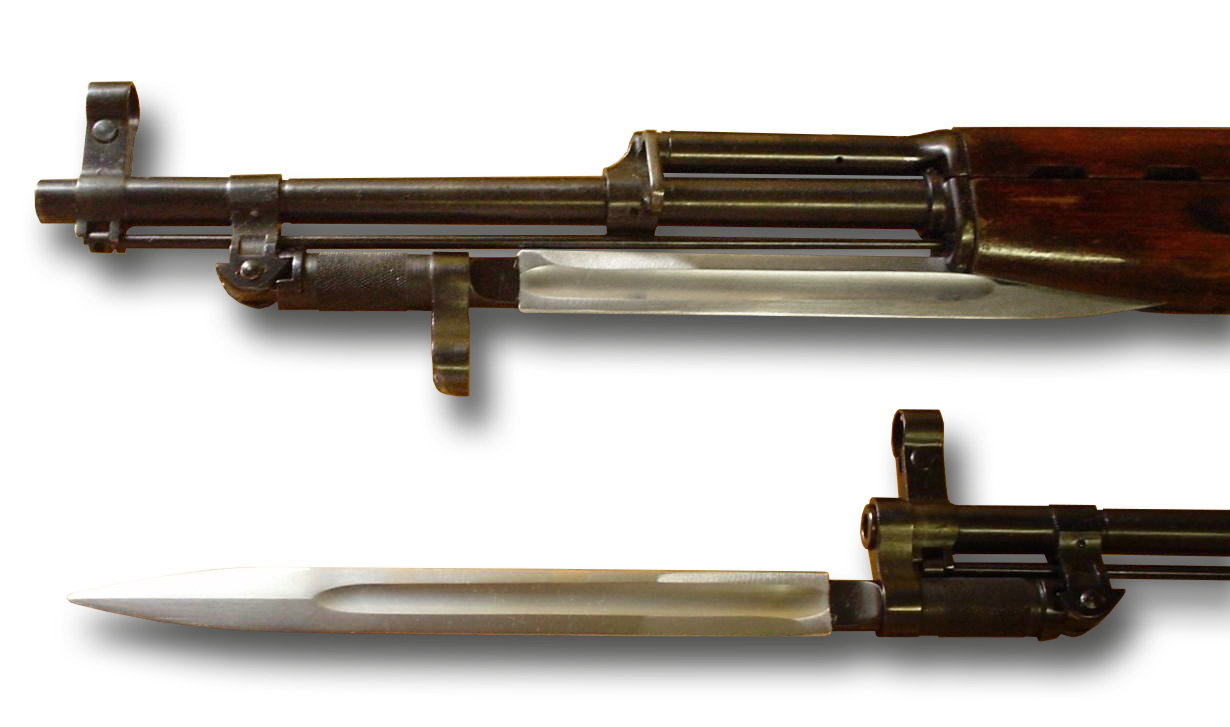
An SKS with a blade-type bayonet in its closed (folded back) and open positions.

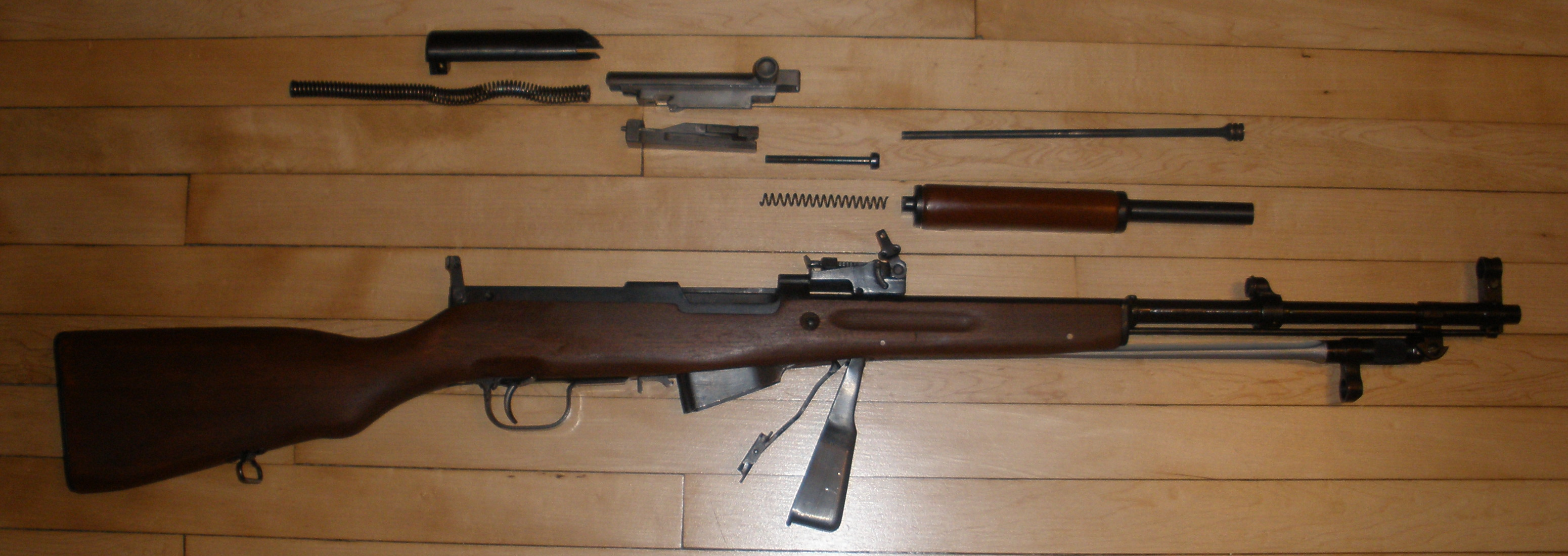
A field-stripped SKS carbine (disassembled into major components for cleaning).

The SKS is a gas-operated carbine with a conventional wooden stock and a fixed ten-round box magazine enclosed inside the receiver. It has a tilting bolt and a gas piston operating rod that works to unlock and cycle the action via gas pressure. When a round is discharged, some of the gases in the bore are diverted through the gas port and impinge on the head of the piston. The piston is driven rearwards and the tappet strikes the bolt carrier; a spring returns the tappet and piston to their forward position. The bolt carrier is driven rearwards, which causes it to lift and unlock the bolt and allowing it to be carried rearwards against the recoil spring. This allows the fired cartridge case to be ejected, and as the bolt is returned to its original position by the recoil spring it strips a new round from the magazine and chambers it.

The SKS magazine can be loaded either by hand or from a stripper clip which seats in the bolt carrier. To load the rifle, the cocking handle on the right of the bolt is retracted, and if the magazine is empty the bolt will remain at the rear. When the magazine is fully loaded, the bolt is pulled slightly back then released, at which time it will chamber the first round. Cartridges stored in the magazine can be removed by pulling back on a latch located forward of the trigger guard (thus opening the "floor" of the magazine and allowing the rounds to fall out).

When the magazine is expended, a small stud extension on the magazine follower engages the bolt hold open, locking the bolt to the rear. After the magazine follower is depressed by the insertion of ammunition or opened from the bottom, the stud continues to hold the bolt at the rear of the receiver until the bolt is pulled back, at which time it drops into its normal position and releases the bolt to chamber the next round.

While early (1949–50) Soviet models had spring-loaded firing pins, which held the pin away from cartridge primers until struck by the action's hammer, most variants of the SKS have a free-floating firing pin within the bolt. Because of this design, care must be taken during cleaning (especially after long storage packed in cosmoline) to ensure that the firing pin can freely move and does not stick in the forward position within the bolt. SKS firing pins that are stuck in the forward position have been known to cause accidental "slamfires" (the rifle firing on its own, without pulling the trigger and often without being fully locked). This behavior is less likely with the hard primer military-spec ammo for which the SKS was designed, but as with any rifle, users should properly maintain their firearms. For collectors, slamfires are more likely when the bolt still has remnants of cosmoline embedded in it that retard firing pin movement. As it is triangular in cross section with only one way to properly insert it (notches up), slamfires can also result if the firing pin is inserted in one of the other two orientations.

SKS rifles, with the exception of the Yugoslavian variant, the barrel is chrome-lined for increased wear and heat tolerance from sustained fire and to resist corrosion from chlorate-primed corrosive ammunition, as well as to facilitate easier bore cleaning.

The cleverly designed safety lever is curved and positioned astride the trigger guard, blocking the trigger finger from the trigger while the safety is on. The design effectively gives the shooter a tactile reminder the safety is on prior to an attempt to fire. The safety can be switched on and off completely silently.

The front sight has a hooded post. The rear sight is an open notch type which is adjustable for elevation from 100 to 1,000 metres (110 to 1,090 yd). There is also an all-purpose "battle" setting on the sight ladder (marked "П", for "Прямой выстрел", meaning "Straight shot"), set for 300 metres (330 yards). This is attained by moving the elevation slide to the rear of the ladder as far as it will go.

All military SKSs have a bayonet attached to the underside of the barrel, which is extended and retracted via a spring-loaded hinge. Both blade and spike bayonets were produced. Spike bayonets were used on the 1949 Tula Russian SKS-45, the Chinese Type 56 from mid 1964 onward, and the Albanian Model 561.

The SKS is easily field stripped and reassembled without specialized tools, and the trigger group and magazine can be removed with an unfired cartridge, or with the receiver cover. The rifle has a cleaning kit stored in a trapdoor in the buttstock, with a cleaning rod running under the barrel, in the same style as the AK-47. The cap for the cleaning kit also serves as a cleaning rod guide, to protect the crown from being damaged during cleaning. The body of the cleaning kit serves as the cleaning rod handle. In common with some other Soviet-era designs, it trades some accuracy for ruggedness, reliability, ease of maintenance, ease of use, and low manufacturing cost.

== Development history ==
The Soviet Union utilized a number of semi-automatic as well as select-fire rifles during World War II, namely the AVS-36, SVT-38, and SVT-40. However, the primary service rifle of the Red Army remained the bolt-action Mosin–Nagant, which fired the powerful but heavy 7.62×54mmR round. Even prior to the war, the Red Army had recognized that these weapons were obsolete and initiated a program to modernize its existing small arms, although this was interrupted by the German invasion of the Soviet Union in 1941. Among the military development programs the Soviet Union had monitored in other countries were the Finnish, Swiss, and German developments in intermediate rifle cartridges. These had limited range and muzzle velocity compared to the 7.62×54mmR and other contemporary rifle rounds such as the 7.92×57mm Mauser and the .30-06 Springfield, but also possessed numerous advantages: they were cheaper to manufacture, permitted easier weapons handling due to their much-reduced recoil and muzzle blast, and enabled infantry to carry more due to their small size and light weight. They could also be fired from shorter and lighter rifles. The Red Army's interest in an intermediate cartridge was piqued when stocks of 7.92×33mm Kurz ammunition were captured from the Wehrmacht, and by the end of 1943, Soviet technicians had developed a similar cartridge based closely on the German design, the 7.62×39mm M43. Early trials showed that the new round had the penetrative capacity to pierce three panels of plywood, each of 2.25 cm thickness, at a six hundred meter range. Red Army officials believed this was more than enough power to wound or kill a soldier at typical battlefield range. Limited production of the new ammunition type commenced in 1944.

Hurried efforts were made to introduce a rifle capable of firing the new cartridge, and the first prominent design was offered by Sergei Gavrilovich Simonov. This was known as the Samozaryadny Karabin sistemy Simonova (SKS), or "Simonov's self-loading carbine system" Simonov had already been working on a semi-automatic carbine chambered for a lighter cartridge as early as 1941, owing to recent complaints about the effectiveness of the SVT-40. In fact, one of his earliest prototypes was chambered for the 7.62×25mm Tokarev pistol cartridge, which was also used in the PPSh-41 submachine gun. He also built at least one prototype chambered for the larger 7.62×54mmR cartridge. Unlike previous Soviet semi-automatic rifles, these utilized fixed five or ten-round magazines loaded from stripper clips. They were also distinguished by a large muzzle brake and a fixed gas system covered with a metal shroud. Simonov's design was based on the operating mechanism of the PTRS-41 anti-tank rifle he'd previously developed for the Red Army the same year. On 1 July 1941, the Artillery Committee of the Red Army noted in its records that the Simonov's self-loading carbine, designated SKS-41, satisfied its basic "tactical and technical requirements". The Committee praised the SKS-41 for its light weight and the design of its fixed magazine; it recommended that 50 pre-production models with ten-round magazines be presented to the Red Army for trials. The SKS-41 was to be chambered for the 7.62×54mmR cartridge for logistical reasons, as the Soviet government wished to adapt its existing rifle barrel production lines for the new carbine.

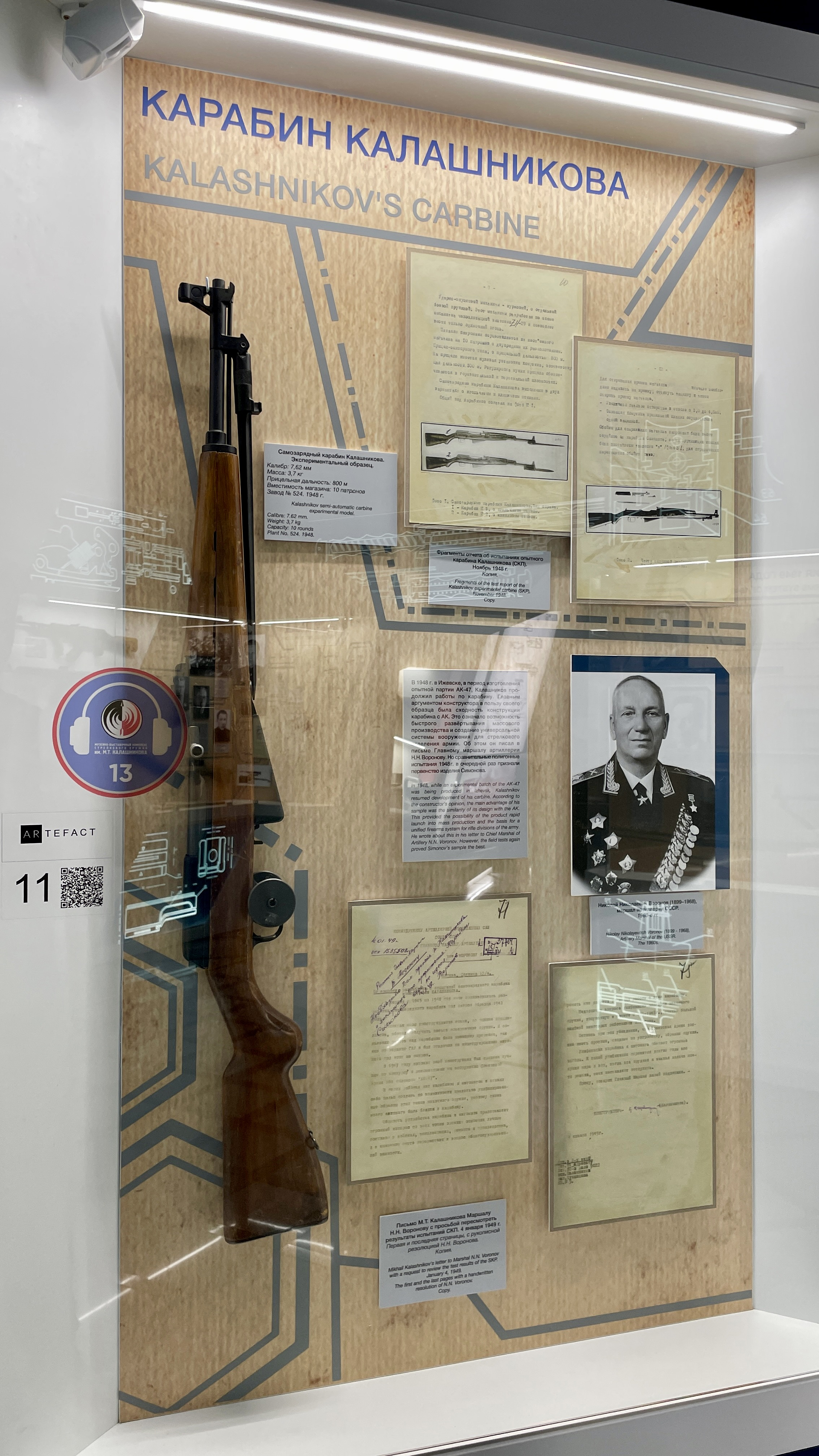
Kalashnikov's carbine, which resembled an amalgamation of the SKS and M1 Garand.

Red Army evaluation of the SKS-41 prototypes was shelved due to the German invasion, and did not resume until Simonov rechambered his weapon to accommodate the 7.62×39mm cartridge in 1944. He also made a number of other detail improvements to his original carbine, omitting the large and unwieldy muzzle brake, adding a folding bayonet, and replacing the metal gas system shroud with a removable wooden upper handguard and gas tube which housed the gas piston. The gas tube and upper handguard could now be removed as needed to access the gas port and piston for cleaning. The appearance of a 7.62×39mm prototype revived interest in Simonov's design, as only he and one other weapons designer, Alexey Sudayev, were able to produce rifles chambered for the new round on short notice. Sudayev's prototype was a less conventional, more compact assault rifle which more closely resembled the later AK-47. A second 7.62×39mm semi-automatic carbine contender was later offered by Mikhail Kalashnikov; this was based on the operating system of the M1 Garand. Kalashnikov's carbine appeared too late to participate in the Red Army's initial evaluation, and was rejected as the decision had already been made to submit the SKS for field trials.

The SKS was light, simple, and considerably shorter than the Mosin–Nagant, which made it easier to handle in dense foliage and urban environments. Simonov deliberately designed the SKS with loose-fitting parts, making it less likely to jam when dirty or inadequately lubricated. This was a notable departure from the relatively tight tolerances on the previous generation of Soviet semi-automatic rifles, and was also part of the design process of the AK-47. The SKS was officially designated as a carbine, although it did not fulfill the same role as the M1 carbine used in the United States Army at the time, and more resembled a traditional infantry rifle both in terms of design and envisaged role. Simonov's early 7.62×39mm models were quickly pressed into service with troops of the 1st Belorussian Front during the final months of World War II. The SKS was still undergoing active field trials when Germany surrendered to the Allies in May 1945. At the war's end, the trials commission in the 1st Belorussian Front recommended the carbine be accepted into general service as the SKS-45. Mass production was delayed while the SKS underwent minor technical changes and alterations as a result of its trial performance during the war. By the end of the 1940s, it finally superseded the various models of the Mosin–Nagant as the standard Soviet infantry rifle.

The AK-47 assault rifle and the RPD machine gun, both firing the same 7.62×39mm cartridge, were introduced into Soviet service around the same time to complement the SKS. During the 1950s, the Soviet Army rapidly mechanized its existing infantry formations, shifting primarily from light infantry on foot to a much more mobile force deploying from armored vehicles. This fundamental shift in tactics called for large volumes of automatic fire to be delivered from moving vehicles, and the AK-47, with its select-fire capability, compact size, and larger detachable magazine, was more appropriate for this role than the SKS. As a result, the AK-47 gradually replaced the SKS as the standard service rifle of the Soviet Army throughout the 1950s. A US Army review of Soviet tactics and weapons found that "the SKS was phased out of infantry use in the late 1950s, not because of any inherent faults, but because a radical change in Soviet tactics rendered it obsolete." However, even at the time of its introduction, Soviet military strategists had always desired an infantry rifle with more firepower than the SKS. They needed a weapon that better permitted the infantry to give massed automatic fire during an offensive. Military historian Edward Ezell suggested that the SKS was always intended to be an interim solution, and the Soviets simply pushed it into production because they wanted any rifle chambered for the 7.62×39mm cartridge in general service as soon as possible, while a select-fire assault rifle was still being perfected. Small arms expert John Walter concurs in his works, noting that the SKS was "ordered into series production largely to gain experience with the new M43 intermediate ammunition and buy time while a true assault rifle was developed." There was a proposal that the SKS could be retained as a dedicated marksman rifle, but it failed to meet the accuracy requirements and this role was subsequently filled by a new weapon, the SVD.

In June 1955, the Soviet Union hosted a military and civilian delegation from the People's Republic of China led by General Zhao Erlu. The Chinese delegation was given a tour of the Tula Arms Plant, where they observed the assembly of SKS carbines. General Erlu expressed an interest in acquiring the technology for the SKS, as China had previously only been granted a license to produce the Mosin–Nagant, which was by then a rather antiquated design. After negotiations between Mao Zedong and Soviet premier Nikita Khrushchev, the Soviet Union agreed to transfer the technology for the SKS, as well as the AK-47 and the 7.62×39mm cartridge. Parallel production lines for the SKS and the AK-47 were set up in China the following year. Chinese production of the SKS continued for decades after it ceased in the Soviet Union, and over nine million had been manufactured as the Type 56 carbine in that country by the 1980s. Eighty Chinese factories eventually tooled up to produce the Type 56 carbine, although the primary production line was established at the Jianshe Machine Tool Factory, officially designated Factory 296. The Chinese carbines were mostly identical to the Soviet weapon, although their receivers were produced with carbon steel rather than the Soviet specified chrome-nickel alloy steel. Over the course of production, the Type 56 carbine was also manufactured with a greater percentage of stamped as opposed to machined parts.

In terms of production numbers, the SKS was the ninth most produced self-loading rifle design in history. Nearly all the Warsaw Pact member states adopted the SKS at one time or another, and technical specifications to produce the carbine were shared with the German Democratic Republic (East Germany) and Romania. With the assistance of Soviet or Chinese technicians and generous military grants, armaments factories producing SKS carbines were later established in North Vietnam, North Korea, Yugoslavia, and Albania as well.

While remaining far less ubiquitous than the AK, both original SKS carbines and foreign variants can still be found today in civilian hands as well as in the arsenals of insurgent groups and paramilitary forces around the world. The SKS has been circulated in up to 69 countries, both by national governments and non-state actors. In 2016, it remained in the reserve and training inventories of over 50 national armies.

== Service history ==
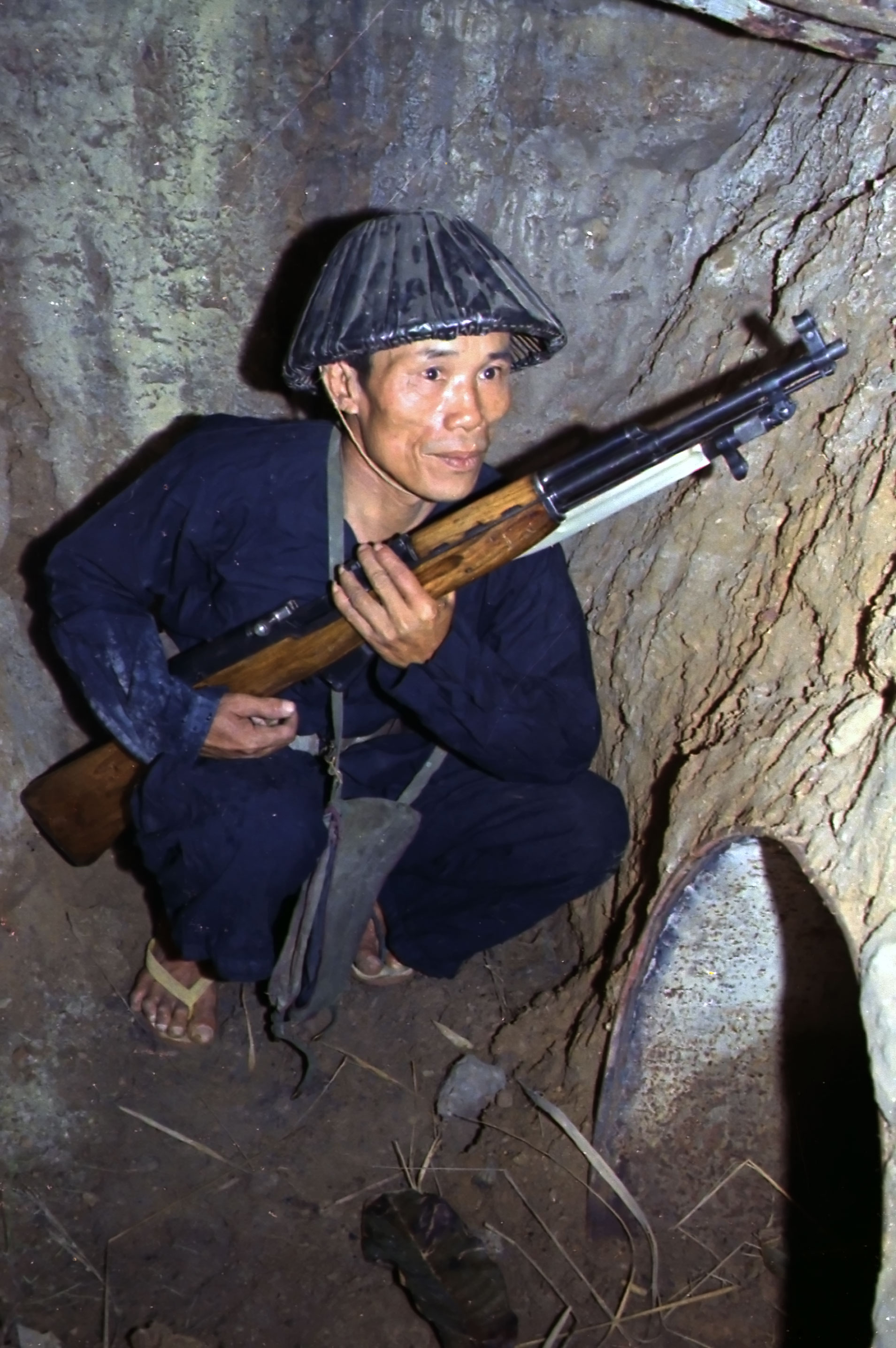
A guerrilla of the Liberation Army of South Vietnam (Viet Cong) crouching in a tunnel with a Chinese SKS.

A few years after the SKS was brought into service in 1949, it was rendered obsolete for the Soviet military by the new AK-47, which was adopted in increasing numbers by Soviet front-line units throughout the 1950s. During the early 1950s, the typical Soviet rifle squad was organized on the basis of the SKS and the RPD light machine gun, which was chambered for the same 7.62×39mm ammunition. The RPD's role was the designated squad automatic weapon, laying down suppressive fire in support of infantry armed with semi-automatic carbines. The Soviet Army wanted all members of the rifle squad to have the ability to use fully automatic fire as needed, which played a pivotal role in the AK gaining favor as the standard infantry weapon over the SKS. The SKS and RPD were also very different weapons with no interchangeable parts, and they required separate training and maintenance programs. As a result, a light machine gun more compatible with the rest of the rifle squad's weapons was requested. This would result in the adoption of the RPK light machine gun. The RPK was derived directly from the AK, could use AK magazines and had an identical manual of arms.

The Central Intelligence Agency (CIA) first noted the SKS replacing the Mosin–Nagant with front-line Soviet units in Europe in 1954, and began compiling detailed information about the new service rifle. The CIA observed that the AK-47 was being introduced at the same time to replace the PPSh-41 submachine gun. Two years later, the SKS was used by Soviet troops and Hungarian partisans alike during the 1956 Hungarian Revolution. Thereafter, while the SKS was retained for various auxiliary duties, it ceased to have any real military significance in the Soviet Union. Only a small number remained in active service, mostly with support units, until the 1980s. However, the SKS found a longer second life in the service of various Soviet-aligned nations, in particular the People's Republic of China. The Chinese state manufactured it for decades after production had ceased in the Soviet Union, mainly to arm its vast military reserves and militia forces.

The SKS was in general issue with regular units of the People's Liberation Army (PLA) for thirty years as the Type 56 carbine. In the Sino-Indian War of 1962, the semi-automatic carbine gave the PLA a distinct advantage over the Indian infantry, then armed with bolt-action Lee–Enfield rifles. During the early 1960s, China developed the Type 63 assault rifle to replace the Type 56, but it failed to meet the PLA's standards and was withdrawn from service after a short period. In 1978, the typical PLA infantry battalion was still armed with 360 Type 56 carbines and 221 Type 56 assault rifles. PLA forces armed primarily with Type 56 carbines fought Soviet troops armed primarily with AKM rifles during the Sino-Soviet border conflict. During the Sino-Vietnamese War, PLA infantry armed primarily with Type 56 carbines engaged Vietnamese infantry armed with the same weapon and its Soviet equivalent. The conflict was notable in that both sides commonly fielded the SKS/Type 56 carbine alongside AK-pattern automatic rifles, although the Vietnamese forces had largely transitioned to the latter while the PLA had not. The Type 56 carbine was retired from PLA service in the late 1980s, when it was replaced by the Type 81 assault rifle. Aside from ceremonial purposes, it remained in limited use as a training rifle for military cadets and members of the Chinese state militia during the 1990s and 2000s.

The Polish People's Republic and Socialist Republic of Romania received technical assistance from the Soviet Union to produce the SKS under license in 1956. However, later that year the Polish general staff belatedly rejected the SKS as a standard service rifle, choosing to retain the AK-47 for that role instead. The Polish government subsequently resold the technical data package and tooling equipment to the German Democratic Republic (East Germany) in 1959. The East German National People's Army (NVA) was rearmed with the SKS, designated the Karabiner-S, during the early 1960s. The first examples of the SKS directly acquired by the United States were three Karabiner-S carbines stolen by NVA soldiers near Potsdam in 1961. These weapons were sold to a visiting American military officer whose vehicle was not subject to search, enabling him to smuggle them into West Germany. One Karabiner-S was presented to General Garrison H. Davidson as a commemorative piece in 1962, while the other two were sent to the United States for further study in 1963. The NVA began to retire the Karabiner-S from front-line service during the late 1960s, at which time many had their official markings defaced to minimize their intelligence value and were exported overseas to other friendly socialist states such as North Vietnam.

Before adopting domestic AK-47 derivatives, a number of non-aligned nations such as Egypt and Yugoslavia adopted the SKS as a standard service rifle. The Egyptian Army used the SKS extensively during the Suez Crisis, and a number were captured and evaluated by Western intelligence agencies in the aftermath of that conflict. Some Egyptian forces were still armed with the SKS as late as the Six Day War, which saw thousands of the carbines captured by the Israel Defense Forces (IDF). During its own evaluation of the weapon, the IDF described the SKS as "first rate in several respects" but noted the difficulty of loading the fixed magazine quickly with stripper clips, especially during night fighting operations when visibility was poor.

The Indonesian Army attempted to adopt the Type 56 carbine as its standard service rifle during the early 1960s, and ordered 100,000 from China following negotiations between Sukarno and Premier Zhou Enlai in 1962. However, deliveries of the carbines were interrupted by a political crisis in Indonesia during the mid 1960s, and only 25,000 actually reached the army. Many were also diverted to the Communist Party of Indonesia's paramilitary forces by sympathetic Indonesian officials.

Beginning in the 1960s, vast quantities of SKS carbines from military reserve stocks were donated by the Soviet Union and China to left-wing guerrilla movements around the world. The increasing ubiquity of the SKS altered the dynamics of asymmetric warfare in developing nations and colonial territories, where most guerrillas had previously been armed with bolt-action rifles. For example, the SKS served as one of the primary arms of the Viet Cong during the Vietnam War. The weapon type was encountered so frequently by the United States Armed Forces in Vietnam that captured examples were used by opposing force (OPFOR) units during training exercises designed to simulate battlefield conditions there as early as 1969. Captured SKS carbines were also prized as war trophies among individual US military personnel, and a number were brought back to the United States by returning veterans over the course of the Vietnam conflict.

The SKS found particular favour in southern Africa, where it was used by a number of insurgent armies fighting to overthrow colonial rule in Angola, Rhodesia (Zimbabwe), and South West Africa (Namibia). After Angolan independence, the Soviet Union delivered up to 5,000 SKS carbines to support the People's Movement for the Liberation of Angola (MPLA) during that country's lengthy civil war. The MPLA's primary opponent, the National Union for the Total Independence of Angola (UNITA), commonly used Type 56 carbines supplied by China. The SKS was also used in large quantities by uMkhonto we Sizwe (MK), the armed wing of the African National Congress (ANC) in South Africa. Between 1963 and 1990, the Soviet Union shipped 3,362 SKS carbines to MK through the guerrillas' external sanctuaries in Angola and Tanzania. SKS carbines captured from MK by the South African security forces were used to arm militias of the Inkatha Freedom Party (IFP) during its internal power struggle with the ANC in the 1980s and 1990s.

East Germany and the Soviet Union both armed various factions of the Palestine Liberation Organization (PLO) with SKS carbines from the 1950s through the 1970s; these were used against the IDF and in various internecine clashes during the Lebanese Civil War. The Soviet carbines were initially shipped to PLO training camps in Egypt, where the Egyptian Army provided instructors to train PLO fighters in their use.

Both Type 56 and Soviet SKS carbines were used by Simba forces during the Simba Rebellion in the Democratic Republic of the Congo. The rebels appreciated the carbine for its relatively compact size, light cartridge, and chrome-lined bore (which made it resistant to rust and corrosion in the tropical climate) over the much bulkier Western battle rifles used by Congolese security forces. The African Party for the Independence of Guinea and Cape Verde (PAIG) favored the SKS as one of its primary small arms during the Guinea-Bissau War of Independence. Captured PAIG carbines were stored and later re-issued by Portugal to its local colonial units, primarily for garrison duties. A number of Type 56 carbines were acquired and used alongside the more ubiquitous AK-pattern rifles by the Provisional Irish Republican Army during the Troubles. China also supplied the Afghan mujahidin with Type 56 carbines during the early years of the Soviet–Afghan War. During the Dhofar Rebellion, SKS carbines were smuggled into Oman by sea, most likely by the Soviet Union, to arm Popular Front for the Liberation of Oman (PFLO) insurgents there. The Eritrean Liberation Front used large numbers of SKS carbines during the Eritrean War of Independence. The Communist Party of Thailand (CPT) used the SKS during its insurgency until the early 1980s, when it ceased militant operations. Cuban and Grenadian military forces used the SKS during the 1983 US invasion of Grenada. The US Army captured 4,074 SKS carbines during the invasion, mostly from arms depots.

By the early 1980s, the SKS had been almost entirely superseded in worldwide military service by the AK-47 and its derivatives. The increasing proliferation of cheap AK-pattern rifles in most asymmetric conflicts also ended the popularity of the SKS as a standard guerrilla arm. At that time, the majority of the remaining carbines still in active use were being issued to state-sponsored militias and other paramilitary formations for internal security duties. Following the dissolution of the Soviet Union, SKS carbines proliferated in various civil wars and regional conflicts throughout the former Soviet republics, including the War in Abkhazia, War of Dagestan, and the war in Donbas. Militant factions in the Balkans frequently used smuggled SKS and Type 56 carbines alongside the Yugoslavian M59/66 derivative during the 1990s and early 2000s. In 2016, the SKS remained in the reserve stockpiles of over 50 national armies, mostly in sub-Saharan Africa and the former Soviet bloc.

== Variants ==
After World War II, the SKS design was licensed or sold to a number of the Soviet Union's allies, including China, Yugoslavia, Albania, North Korea, North Vietnam, East Germany, and Romania. Most of these nations produced nearly identical variants, with the most common modifications being differing styles of bayonets and the 22 mm rifle grenade launcher commonly seen on Yugoslavian models.

=== Soviet and Russian ===
Differences from the "baseline" late Russian Tula Armory/Izhevsk Armory SKS:

- Variations (1949–1958): Early spike-style bayonet (1949) instead of blade-style. Spring-return firing pin was present on early models, and they did not have chrome bores (1949 – early 1951). The gas block had three changes: The first production stage gas block, used from 1949 through early 1950, was squared-off at a 90-degree angle. The second gas block production stage was instead cut at a 45-degree angle, seen on late 1950 to 1951 rifles. The third and final gas block stage, from 1952 through to 1956, was curved inward slightly toward the action.
- SKS marksman rifle: During the late 1950s, the Soviets expressed interest in adopting an SKS variant adapted for the designated marksman role. Some prototypes were produced with side-mounted scope rails to accept a PU scope. These failed to meet the army's accuracy requirements, and the program was abandoned in favor of developing a new dedicated precision rifle.
- SKS M1950: An SKS modified for fully automatic fire. Prototype only.
- SKS M1951: An SKS with a detachable bayonet and detachable box magazine. Prototype only.
- SKS M1953: An SKS with select-fire fire capability, a new muzzle brake, detachable bayonet, and detachable box magazine. One prototype built before further development was canceled due to the decision to replace the SKS in general service with the AK.
- VPO-208: SKS carbine modified with a smoothbore barrel and rechambered for the .366 TKM cartridge for commercial sales.
- OP-SKS. SKS carbines converted into commercial hunting rifles by the Molot ("Hammer") factory in Vyatskiye Polyany (Russian: Вятско-Полянский машиностроительный завод «Молот», English: Vyatskiye Polyany Machine-Building Plant). These were labeled OP (OP = охотничье-промысловый > okhotnich'ye-promyslovyy > "commercial hunting (carbine)"). The OP-SKS continued to be manufactured into the 2000s.

=== Chinese ===
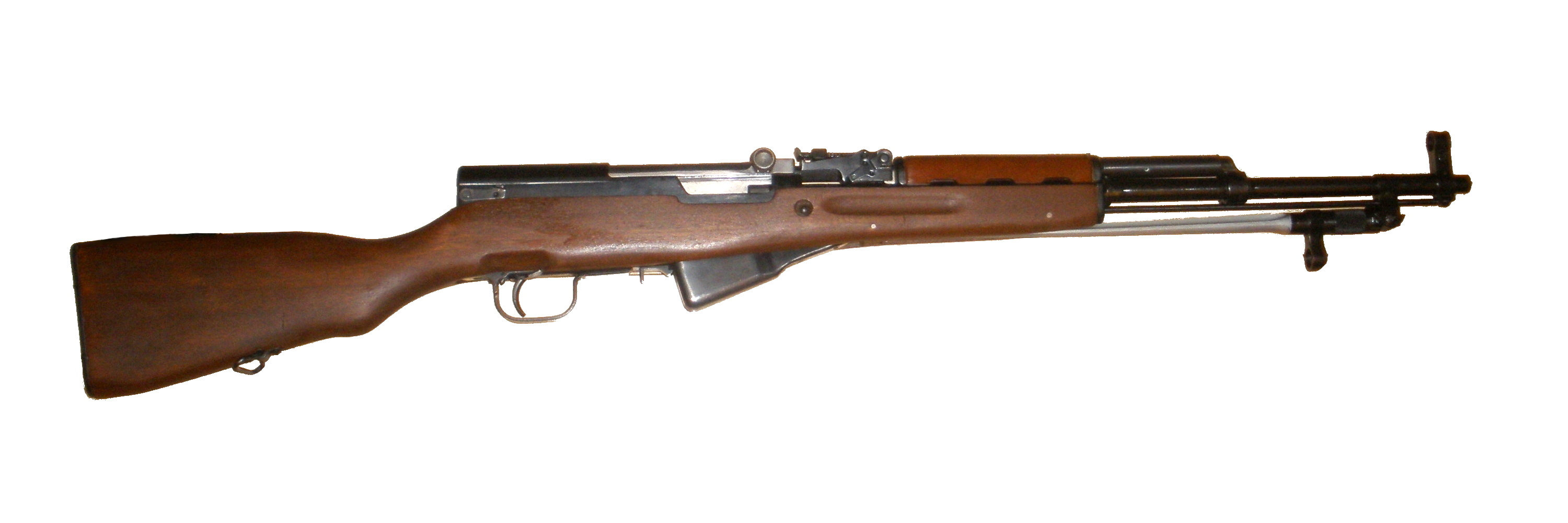
Chinese Type 56 semi-automatic carbine (Chinese SKS).

- Type 56 carbine (1956–1980s): The earliest Type 56 carbines were assembled under the supervision of Soviet technicians, using parts and materials imported from the Soviet Union. Thereafter, minor tweaks were made from the original Soviet design, namely the transition to domestic carbon steel in production as opposed to the Soviet-specified nickel-chrome alloy steel. Early Type 56 carbines had blade bayonets, while those in later production had spike bayonets. Chinese production also introduced a larger proportion of stamped as opposed to machined parts, and the addition of a pressed and pinned barrel.
- Stamped receiver Type 56: In 1970 and 1971, China produced a small number of Type 56 carbines with experimental stamped sheet metal receivers as a cost and weight saving measure. About 12,000 were manufactured before the program was canceled.
- Fiberglass stock Type 56: During the 1960s, China produced a number of Type 56 carbines with fiberglass stocks, known colloquially in Western literature as "Vietnam stocks" or "jungle stocks". These were originally designed for export to North Vietnam and the Viet Cong, due to complaints about wooden stocks rotting or attracting termites while being cached in the tropical environment.
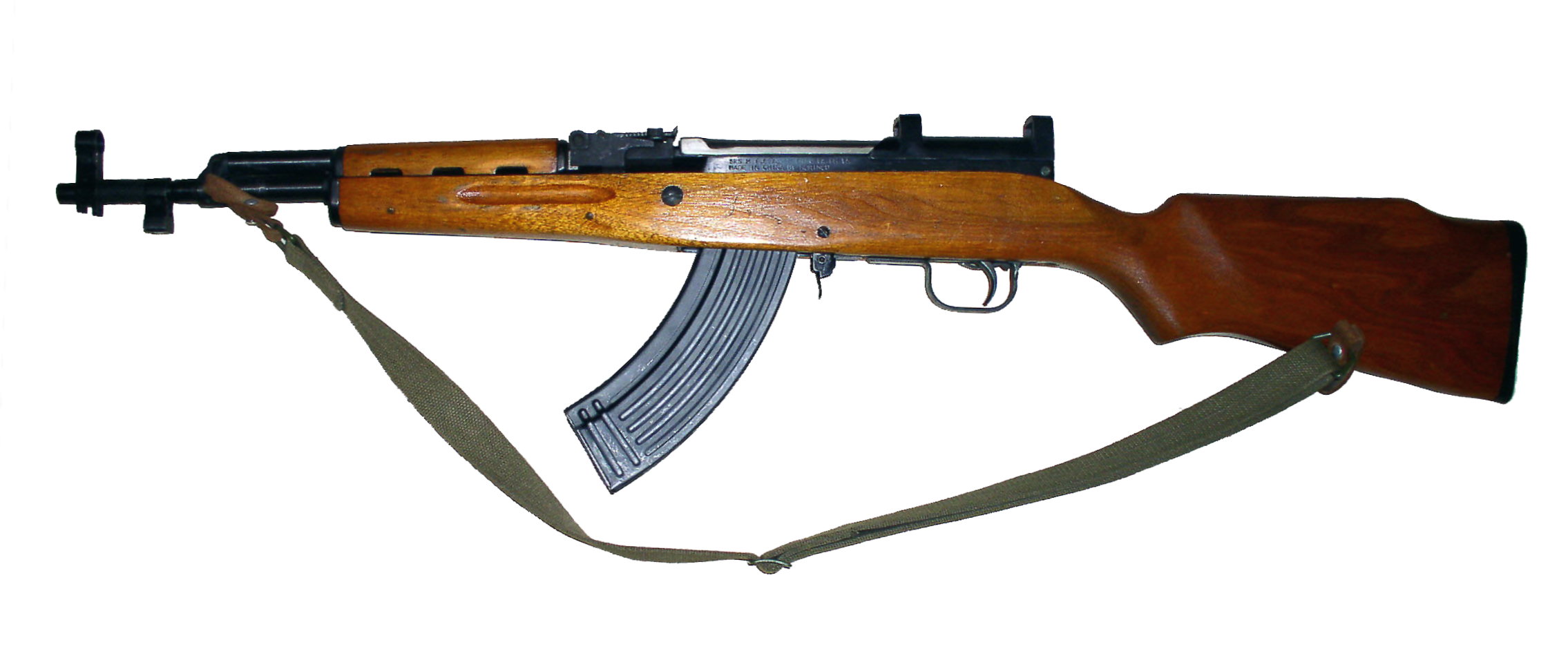
  Norinco Model M with Monte Carlo cheek-piece stock and detachable 30-round AK-47 magazine
- Type 56 Model 84: Short-barreled variant with a detachable magazine produced for overseas commercial sales. The Model 84 magazine resembled that of the AK-47/Type 56 assault rifle, and the two were theoretically interchangeable. However, standard Kalashnikov magazines needed modification to fit the Model 84.
- Type 56 Model D: Variant which could accept standard Kalashnikov magazines, produced for overseas commercial sales.
- Type 56 Model M: Derivative of the Model D with the bayonet lug removed and fitted with a new stock to comply with US import laws.

=== Other European ===
- Romanian M56: Produced between 1956 and 1960. Typically, they are identical or nearly identical to the late Soviet model.
- Polish ksS: Refurbished Soviet rifles fitted with unique Polish laminated stocks. A few hundred SKS carbines were given to Poland by the Soviet Union around 1954. While Poland did import the technical data package and tooling equipment to produce the SKS under license, the Polish People's Army belatedly rejected the weapon for general service in 1956 and the program was canceled. In Polish service the SKS was used only for ceremonial purposes and was designated as ksS which stands for karabin samopowtarzalny Simonowa, Simonov's semi-automatic rifle.
- Yugoslav PAP M59: Manufactured by Zastava Arms between 1959 and 1966. Barrel is not chrome-lined. PAP stands for "Polu-automatska puška" (Semi-automatic rifle) and the rifle was nicknamed "Papovka". Otherwise this rifle is nearly identical to the Soviet version. Many were converted to the M59/66 variant during refurbishment.
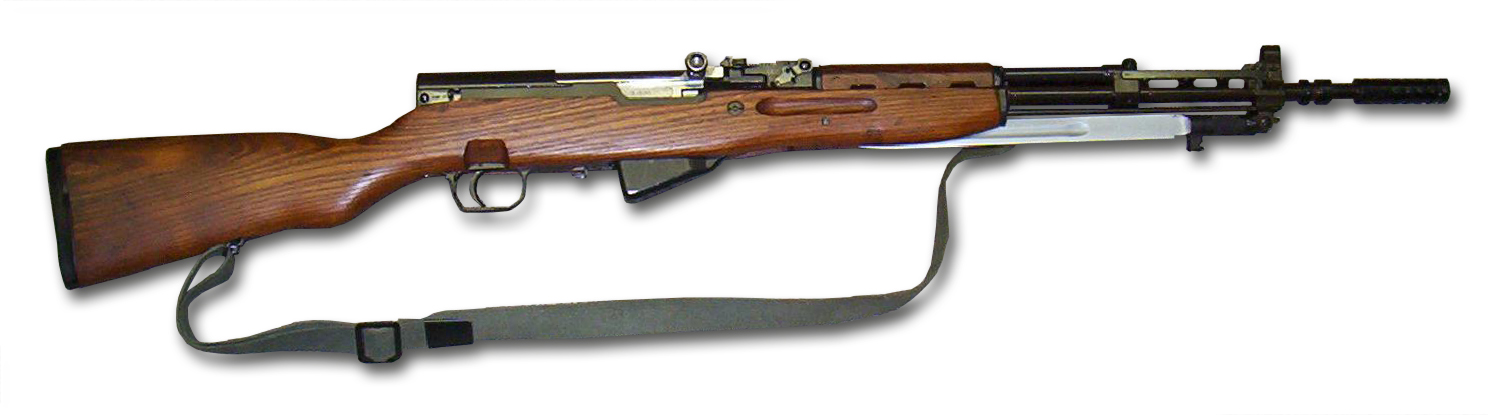
  Yugoslav M59/66 with the muzzle formed into a spigot-type grenade launcher and a folding ladder grenade sight behind the front sight.
  - Yugoslav PAP M59/66: Produced between 1967 and 1989. Added 22 mm rifle grenade launcher which appears visually like a flash suppressor or muzzle brake on the end of the barrel. Front sight has a fold-up "ladder" for use in grenade sighting. To raise the grenade sight, the gas port must be manually blocked and the action must be manually cycled—rifle grenades must be fired with special blank cartridges, and this feature helps ensure that the gas pressure is not wasted on cycling the action. The gas port must be manually opened to again allow semi-automatic operation. Barrel was not chrome-lined. Both the grenade launcher and grenade sight are NATO spec. Stock is typically made from beech wood.
  - Yugoslav PAP M59/66A1: Same as above, except with the addition of flip up phosphorescent or tritium night sights.
- Albanian Type 56-1: Produced between 1967 and 1978. There were no rifles produced from 1972 to 1975. Produced by the UM GRAMSH factory located in Gramsh, Albania. Longer stock and handguard on the gas tube, and AK style charging handle. The magazine is slightly different in the shape visible from the outside. The stock has two compartments with two corresponding holes in the buttplate for cleaning implements instead of the single cleaning kit pocket. Like the Chinese Type 56 carbine, the Albanian version also features a spike bayonet fixed beneath the muzzle. The vast majority were scrapped during the late 1990s, although several thousand were sold on the commercial market in North America during the early 2000s.
- East German Karabiner-S: Slot cut into back of stock for pull-through sling, similar to the slot in a Karabiner 98k. No storage area in back of stock or storage for cleaning rod under barrel. It is believed to have been produced at the J.P. Sauer & Sohn facility in Suhl.

=== Other Asian ===
- North Korean Type 63: Manufactured specifically for the Worker-Peasant Red Guards and other paramilitary forces. At least three separate models were made. One "standard" model with blade bayonet, and a second with a gas shutoff and a grenade launcher, similar to the M59/66. The North Korean grenade launcher was detachable from the muzzle and the gas shutoff was different from the Yugoslav model, however. A third model appears to have side-swinging bayonet.
- Vietnamese Type 1: Nearly identical to both the Soviet and early Chinese SKS. These are identified by a small star on the receiver with a 1 in the center. The barrel is chromed, as are many of the internal parts. They were assembled in a small arms factory with Chinese assistance located 12 km north of Yên Bái with 6,000 SKS rifles made between 1962 and 1965 when the factory was closed to American bombing raids.
  - Vietnamese clone: The Viet Cong manufactured somewhat rudimentary copies of the SKS, which are sometimes seen with crude finish and obvious tool markings.

== Conflicts ==
In the more than 70 years of use worldwide, the SKS has seen use in conflicts all over the world.

- World War II (limited)
- Algerian War
- Bangladesh Liberation War
- Suez Crisis
- Simba Rebellion
- Vietnam War
- Hungarian Revolution of 1956
- Guatemalan Civil War
- Portuguese Colonial War
- Rhodesian Bush War
- South African Border War
- The Troubles
- Colombian conflict
- Communist insurgency in Thailand
- Six Day War
- Sino-Soviet border conflict
- Ethiopian Civil War
- Angolan Civil War
- Lebanese Civil War
- Western Sahara War
- Shaba II
- Sino-Vietnamese War
- Soviet–Afghan War
- Nicaraguan Revolution
- Salvadoran Civil War
- Tuareg rebellion (1990–1995)
- Yugoslav Wars
- War in Abkhazia (1992–1993)
- Algerian Civil War
- Burundian Civil War
- Republic of the Congo Civil War (1997–99)
- 1999 East Timorese crisis
- Iran-Iraq War
- Iraq War
- Kivu conflict
- Mexican drug war
- Northern Mali conflict
- War in Donbas (2014–2022)

== Users ==
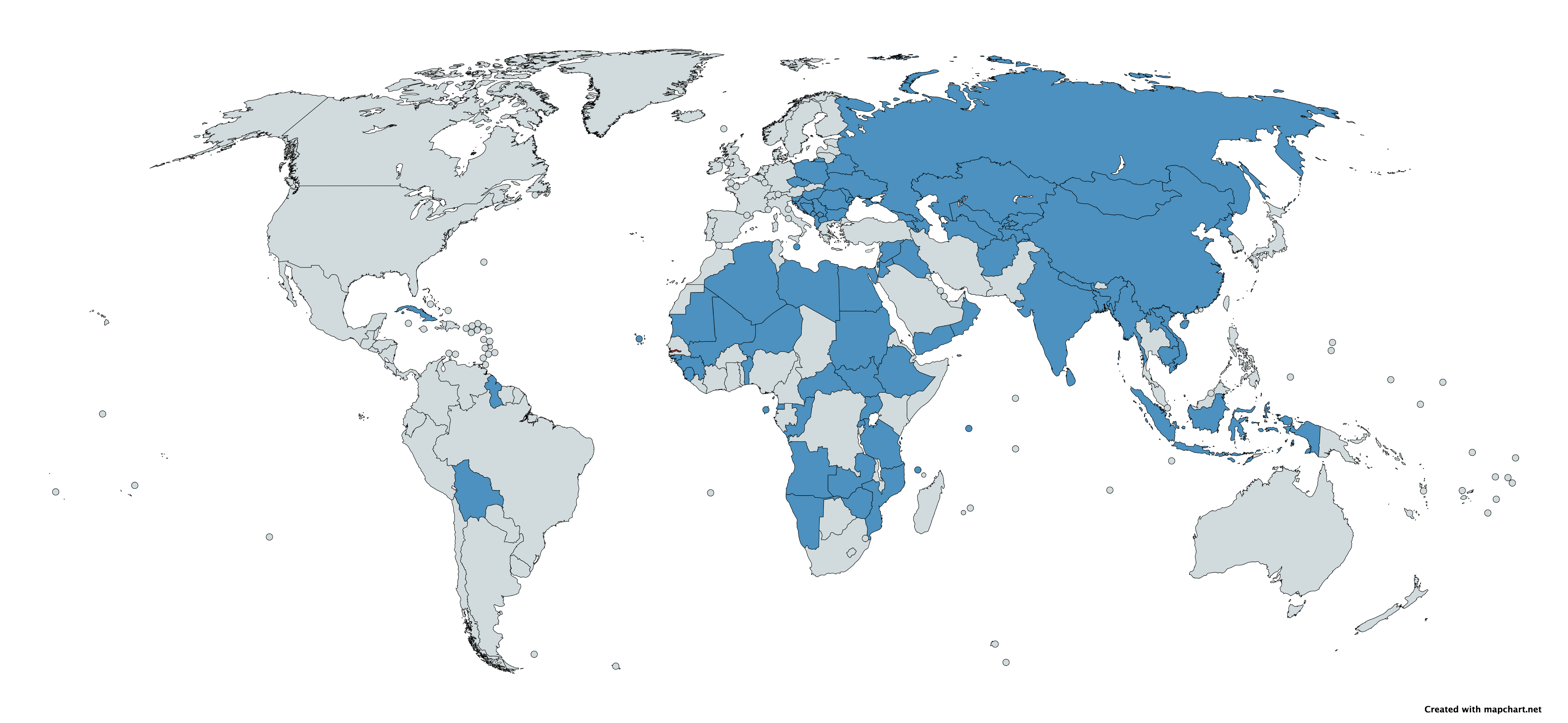
A map with SKS users in blue and former users in red

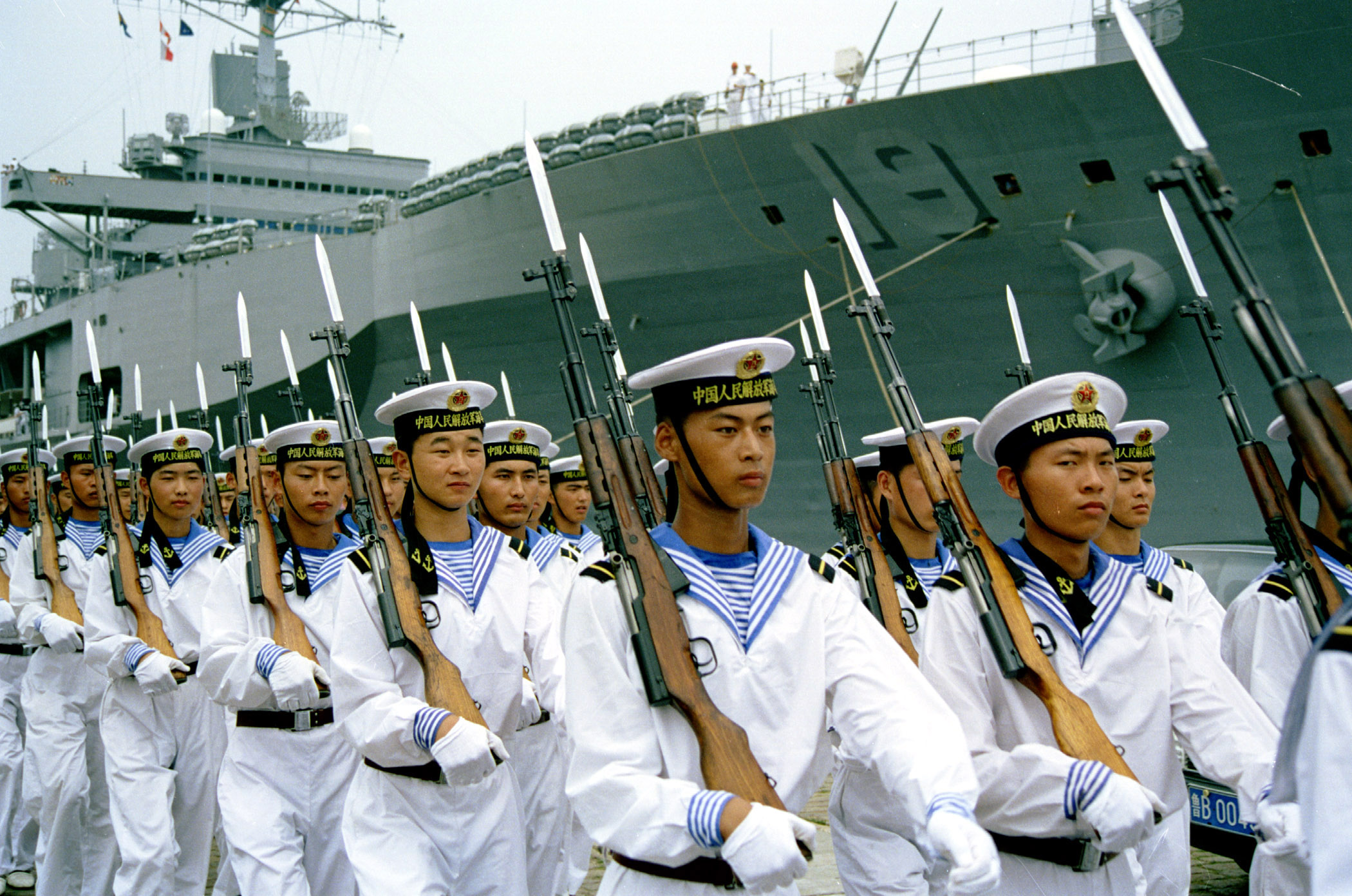
PLAN sailors at Qingdao, North Sea Fleet HQ, parading with Chinese Type 56 carbines.

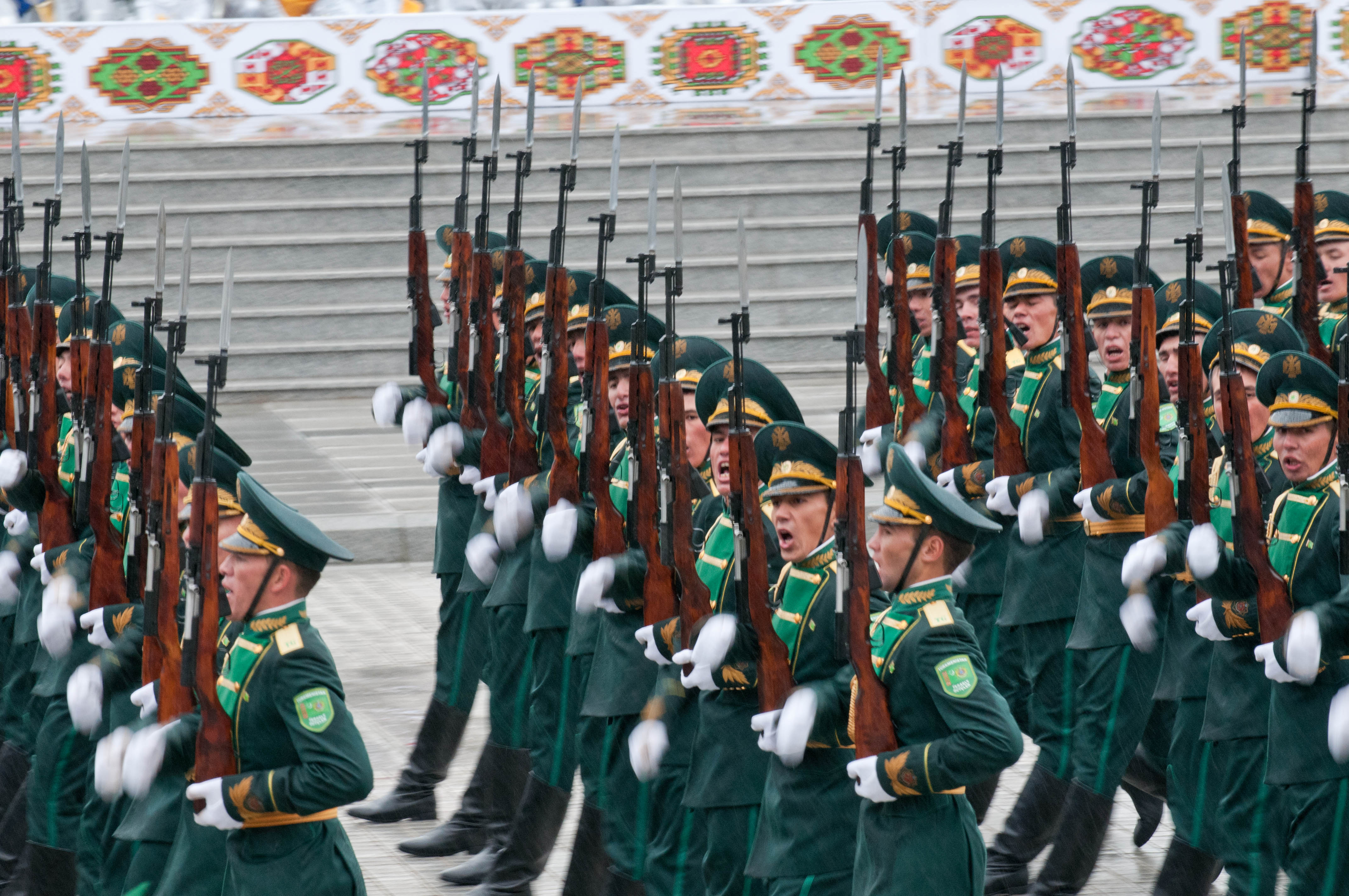
The Independent Honor Guard Battalion of Turkmenistan on parade with Soviet SKS carbines.

- Albania: Ceremonial purposes.
- Algeria
- Angola
- Armenia
- Australia
- Azerbaijan: Ceremonial purposes.
- Bangladesh – Bangladesh Ordnance Factories produced Chinese Type 56 under license until 2006. Currently used by BGB, police and BNCC.
- Belarus
- Belize
- Benin
- Bolivia
- Bosnia-Herzegovina
- Bulgaria: National Guards Unit
- Burkina Faso
- Burundi
- Cambodia
- Cameroon
- Cape Verde
- Central African Republic
- Chile
- China: Type 56 variant. Used for ceremonial purposes by the People's Liberation Army. Also used by Guangdong Provincial Public Security Department for ceremonial purposes.
- Colombia
- Comoros: Type 56 variant.
- Congo-Brazzaville
- Croatia: Ceremonial purposes.
- Cuba
- Cyprus
- Czech
- Egypt
- Equatorial Guinea
- Eritrea
- Ethiopia
- Finland
- Gabon
- Georgia
- Ghana
- Greece
- Guinea
- Guinea-Bissau
- Guyana
- Hong Kong
- Hungary: Ceremonial purposes.
- Indonesia: Type 56 variant.
- India: many rifles including the Type 56 variant were seized from Militants by Assam Rifles in both Kashmir and Manipur but never used or issued.
- Iraq
- Ivory Coast
- Iran
- Kazakhstan
- Kenya: Used by the Kenya Police Reserve.
- Kosovo
- Kyrgyzstan
- Laos
- Liberia
- Libya
- Madagascar
- Malaysia
- Mali
- Malta
- Moldova
- Mongolia
- Montenegro
- Mozambique
- Myanmar
- Namibia
- Nepal
- New Zealand
- North Macedonia
- North Korea
- Oman
- Pakistan
- State of Palestine: used by the Palestinian Honor Guard. SKS were also used by PLO troops in the 1970s
- Panama
- Peru
- Romania: Ceremonial purposes.
- Russia: Ceremonial purposes.
- Rwanda
- Sao Tome and Principe
- Serbia
- Seychelles
- Sierra Leone
- Slovenia: Ceremonial purposes.
- Somalia
- Somaliland
- South Sudan: Used by the South Sudan Police Service.
- Sri Lanka
- Sudan
- Suriname
- Sweden
- Tajikistan
- Tanzania
- Thailand
- Togo
- Transnistria
- Turkmenistan
- Uganda
- Ukraine
- United States
- Uzbekistan
- Vietnam: Ceremonial and militia purposes.
- Yemen
- Zambia: Zastava M59 variant.
- Zimbabwe: Type 56 variant; ceremonial and militia purposes.

=== Former users ===
- Islamic Republic of Afghanistan
- Ba'athist Iraq
- Ba'athist Syria
- Gambia: Type 56 variant.
- East Germany
- Grenada
- Morocco
- Lithuania
- Poland: Ceremonial purposes. Superseded by an honor guard derivative of the MSBS beginning in 2016.
- Portugal: Captured from PAIG insurgents and re-issued to colonial troops in Portuguese Guinea during the 1970s.
- Rhodesia
- South Yemen
- Soviet Union: Retired from front-line service in the mid-1950s, retired from second-line service in the 1980s.
- South Vietnam: Captured and used during Vietnam War.
- Yugoslavia: Zastava M59/66 variant.
- Viet Cong

== Commercial sales and sporting use ==
=== United States ===
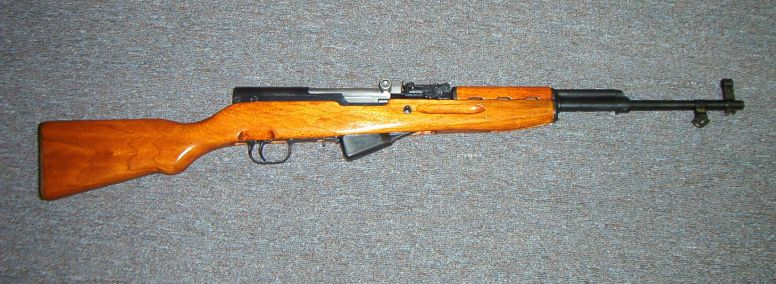
Civilian-owned Chinese Norinco SKS with bayonet and cleaning rod removed.

Initially, the SKS was a rarity in the US, with the only examples being souvenirs brought back by returning veterans of the Vietnam War. Beginning in 1988, thousands of surplus and newly manufactured Chinese Type 56 carbines were imported in the US. Russia, after the collapse of the USSR, also began exporting the SKS to the US during the early 1990s as well.

Due to the high volume of initial imports, the SKS became one of the most affordable centerfire rifles available to American sports shooters, retailing for as little as $70 per weapon in the early 1990s. Dale Armstrong, a former firearms tracking analyst with the Bureau of Alcohol, Tobacco, Firearms and Explosives (ATF), commented on the volume of cheap surplus weapons, naming the SKS and Type 56 carbines specifically alongside Makarov and TT-33 type pistols: "A firearm of that quality could not be made for the price it was being sold. The people selling these firearms in the former Soviet bloc countries assumed control of these stockpiles after the fall of communism ... [therefore] they had no manufacturing cost. These weapons were pure profit, so they could afford to sell them at a low price and in bulk."

Between 1988 and 1998, several million SKS carbines exported from China and the former Soviet Union were sold on the commercial market in the US.

=== Canada ===
The SKS rifle is very popular in Canada, with some users referring to it as "Canada's rifle". While the SKS is imported for commercial sales in Canada, the magazines are affected by Canadian firearms legislation, which limits the magazines to 5 rounds.

Under Canadian law, the SKS is classified as a non-restricted firearm and can be owned with a Possession and Acquisition License. The classification of non-restricted permits it to be used in hunting and on rural crown land. When the Canadian government introduced an amendment to the pending Bill C-21 that would have expanded and changed the basis for classifying prohibited firearms under the law, the resulting ban on the SKS was a particular point of contention because it is widely used for hunting, notably by First Nations Peoples. The leadership of the Assembly of First Nations voted unanimously to express opposition to the amendment. The amendment was eventually withdrawn due to the widespread opposition.

=== Russia ===
Surplus SKS carbines are available in their original chambering for sale to any Russian citizen with a rifle purchase permit. The bayonet must be removed, and an additional pin added to the barrel, to modify the SKS sufficiently from its status as a military arm and render it legal for civilian sales. The carbines are relatively inexpensive in Russia, making them attractive to hunters on a budget. Examples of the SKS modified as smoothbore weapons and firing the unique .366 TKM cartridge are also available on the Russian commercial market. These weapons are legally classified as shotguns, and are favored by Russian sport shooters and hunters who possess the more easily obtainable shotgun purchase permit. The .366 TKM cartridge is a 7.62×39mm cartridge case necked out to accept a .366 caliber slug.

== See also ==
- List of 7.62×39mm firearms
- List of clip-fed firearms
- 701 rifle
- vz. 52 rifle
- Rasheed carbine
- Type 63 assault rifle
