= Remington Model 51 =

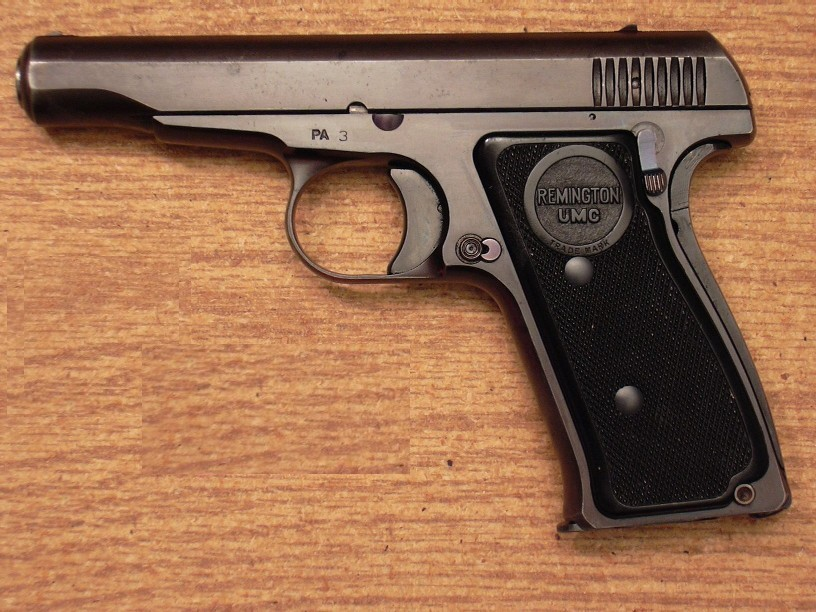
- The Remington 51, left side
- Type: Semi-automatic pistol
- Place of origin: United States

Production history
- Designer: John Pedersen
- Designed: 1917
- Manufacturer: Remington Arms Company
- Produced: 1918–1926
- No. built: Approx. 65,000
- Variants: Remington 53

Specifications
- Mass: 21 oz (600 g)
- Length: 6 5/8 in (168 mm)
- Barrel length: 3 1/4 in (83 mm)
- Width: 0.9 in (22.9 mm)
- Cartridge: .32 ACP.380 ACP
- Action: Hesitation locked
- Feed system: 8-round (.32 ACP) or 7-round (.380 ACP) detachable single-stack box magazine
- Sights: Post and rear notch

The Remington Model 51 is a small pocket pistol designed by John Pedersen and manufactured by Remington Arms in the early 20th century for the American civilian market. Remington manufactured approximately 65,000 Model 51 pistols in .32 ACP and .380 ACP calibers from 1918 to 1926, though small numbers were assembled into the mid-1930s.

== Designer John Pedersen ==
John Pedersen designed or was instrumental in the design of many firearms for the Remington Arms Company. He had worked in concert with John Browning to design the Remington Model 17 shotgun which served as the basis for the Remington Model 31, Ithaca 37, Browning BPS, and Mossberg 500. He designed the Pedersen device that converted the M1903 Springfield into an autoloading pistol-caliber longarm. Pedersen later worked for the US Army and provided competition to John Garand building an autoloading rifle to fire a full-power rifle cartridge. His design used innovative wax lubricated cases and a toggle-bolt system much like that of the Luger pistol but eventually lost out to the M1 Garand.

== Development and production ==
The Model 51 was made in .380 ACP and later in .32 ACP caliber, it was marketed as a pocket pistol. While the European market embraced small-caliber pocket pistols, the American market favored revolvers at the time. The complex trigger and safety mechanisms made the handgun more expensive than the Browning-designed competition, and the Model 51 was not much smaller. Furthermore, Remington was a company known for their long arms; their handguns had previously been limited to revolvers less common compared to Colt in terms of sales. The Remington Model 51 also had only limited commercial success as it was priced around US$15.75 (in 1920, California minimum wage was US$0.33 per hour).

There is an urban legend that the stock market crash of 1929 killed production of the Remington Model 51, since people could no longer afford to buy handguns, especially one costing significantly more than other guns in its market niche, however this is untrue. The Model 51 was produced from 1918 to 1926. Production ended on December 12, 1926 (though large numbers of guns, already produced, were sold in 1927, and small numbers, put together from parts already on hand in the factory, continued to be assembled and sold until 1934). By Black Friday (October 25, 1929), the Remington Model 51 had been out of production for almost three years.

An advantage of Pedersen's design is that it allows for a lighter slide than a straight blowback operated pistol, and hence an overall lighter short arm, with the hesitation lock contributing to less felt recoil for this intuitive pointing pistol. General George S. Patton owned a Remington 51 and was thought to favor the pistol. Despite critical praise, no government or private agency is known to have adopted the Model 51 for use. An anchor proof marking on some pistols has led to the mistaken belief that they were US Navy pistols bolstered by the fact that the Navy did indeed recommend a .45-caliber version for adoption. Some examples are seen today with inventory numbers, however their provenance is not well known and understood to have numbered one, two or six. Subsequently, the Navy ran extensive tests on the M53 and concluded it was “...a simple, rugged and entirely dependable weapon, which should be suitable in every respect for a service pistol.”

In the 1970s and 1980s, inventor Ross Rudd designed and prototyped a .45 ACP caliber pistol based on the Pedersen layout but with an inclined surface in place of the locking surface. This served to delay the opening of the breech rather than locking it. The pistol was planned for manufacture but was never produced. The Italian firm Benelli produced limited numbers of B76, B80, and B82 pistols similar to the Rudd pistol; however, they utilized an inertial locking system

The Remington R51 is a redesigned Model 51 initially released in February 2014 before supply and recall issues by Remington, believed to be built by Para Ordnance, a company recently acquired by the Freedom Group.

== Variants ==
=== .45cal. Model 53 ===
Despite its shortcomings, the design was recommended for adoption by the Navy Board during the First World War as the scaled-up .45 caliber Remington Model 53. Testing of the prototype against production M1911 showed the Remington design to be more reliable. Remington demanded a large advance payment to tool up for the gun, but negotiations were cut short by America's entrance into World War I. Available factories were tooled to produce the M1911 so investment in ramping-up production for another pistol did not make sense. Production of the 1911 kept pace with wartime demands and Remington itself was eventually contracted to produce the Colt weapon.

Because of a lower bore axis, lighter slide, and locked breech, the Remington 53 boasted much less felt recoil than the M1911. This fact was attested to by noted firearms expert Julian Hatcher. The Remington pistol was also more accurate, lighter, and had fewer moving parts than the 1911. Despite its advantages over the M1911, there was too little civilian market to support a large-bore pistol at that time, a military contract was now unlikely, and the M1911 already had a firm foothold. Remington abandoned the larger pistol and focused on the Model 51.

=== 9mm Model R51 ===
In 2014, Remington announced a redesigned Model 51 in 9mm Luger caliber called the R51.

== See also ==
- Remington R51
- 701 rifle
- Pedersen device
- SIG MKMO
- Ashani pistol
- List of delayed blowback firearms
- List of individual weapons of the U.S. Armed Forces
