= Type 63 assault rifle =

Type 63
- Left (compared to Type 56 SKS) and right sides of a Type 63 at the Hanoi Weapons Museum and the Military Museum of the Chinese People's Revolution, respectively
- Type: Assault rifle
- Place of origin: People's Republic of China

Service history
- In service: 1969–present
- Used by: See Users
- Wars: Vietnam War; Cambodian Civil War; Sino-Vietnamese War; Cambodian–Vietnamese War; Tuareg rebellion (1990–1995); Kosovo War; Myanmar Civil War

Production history
- Designed: 1959–1963
- Produced: 1969–1978
- No. built: 1,000,000–6,000,000
- Variants: See Variants

Specifications
- Mass: 3.49 kg (7.7 lb)
- Length: 1.029 m (40.5 in) (with bayonet folded)
- Barrel length: 521 mm (20.5 in)
- Cartridge: 7.62×39mm
- Action: Gas-operated (rotating bolt)
- Rate of fire: 750 rounds/min
- Muzzle velocity: 730 m/s (2,400 ft/s)
- Effective firing range: 400 m (440 yd)
- Feed system: 20-round detachable box magazines

The Type 63 (Chinese: 63式7.62mm自动步枪) is a Chinese 7.62×39mm assault rifle. The weapon's overall design was based on the SKS (known in Chinese service as the Type 56 carbine), but with select fire capability and a rotating bolt system adapted from the Type 56 assault rifle, a derivative of the AK-47. It was originally introduced to replace the SKS as the standard service rifle of the People's Liberation Army, but was prematurely withdrawn from PLA service due to numerous production difficulties. The Type 63 was originally manufactured with a milled steel receiver, although later production models had pressed and riveted steel receivers.

The Type 63 is occasionally misidentified in Western literature as the Type 68.

== History ==
=== Development ===
From 1956 until the late 1980s, the standard service rifle of the People's Liberation Army (PLA) was the Type 56 carbine, a licensed derivative of the Soviet SKS. The SKS was well-regarded by the PLA, but it lacked select-fire capability and was limited to a ten-round fixed magazine fed from stripper clips. To overcome these shortcomings, Chinese military officials specified a new service rifle based on the overall SKS design but capable of fully automatic fire and modified to accept large capacity, detachable magazines. The new weapon had to incorporate a wooden stock and folding bayonet similar to those of the SKS for close quarters fighting. It also needed to be manufactured with the same tooling equipment as the SKS and AK-47 for logistical reasons, as the Chinese government wished to adapt its pre-existing production lines for the new rifle.

Work on the new weapon commenced in 1959, led by a diverse three-tiered development team consisting of technicians from arms factories, engineering faculty and students from universities, and military staff. At first, the team used the plans and technical data from the SKS as the basis for their rifle. However, they later drew more heavily on the internal structure of the AK-47, not only because of its proven select-fire capabilities but also the comparative ease of mass producing parts for that weapon. Uniquely, the design team was also entrusted with overseeing pre-production trials and the initial manufacturing process. The first prototypes became available in 1963, and it received the designation Type 63. The Type 63 was subsequently inspected and approved for service by Mao Zedong in his capacity as chair of the Chinese Central Military Commission.

Serial production of the Type 63 commenced in 1969 and from the beginning was plagued with difficulties. The Chinese government failed to appoint quality control inspectors to oversee the initial phase of manufacturing, and as a result many of the quality control regulations released by the design team were ignored by the factory managers. Although PLA personnel were supposed to aid in the testing of sample rifles, they failed to do so. Due to the lack of oversight, a large number of technically unauthorized changes were made to the Type 63 to simplify or streamline manufacturing, and the original specifications disregarded.

Almost 700 changes were unilaterally made to the Type 63 design without adequate testing or approval from the development team and the PLA. The first catastrophic design change came when factory staff decided to manufacture the Type 63 with a pressed and pinned barrel, as opposed to threading the barrels into the receiver as called for in the technical data. This method was much more cost effective and efficient, but several miscalculations were made which caused the barrels to deform prematurely under stress, and they often failed to fit the receivers properly. Additionally, the pins used to hold the pressed barrels and the receivers in place were of poor quality and suffered a high failure rate. The factory staff also began experimenting with stamped and riveted receivers for the Type 63, as opposed to the original milled receiver design which was much more labor-intensive to produce. The design of the stamped receiver specified an excessive number of rivets, which coupled with the nonexistent quality control, often resulted in inconsistent riveting that compromised the receiver. The decision was also made to simply paint the receivers and barrels rather than producing them with a blued finish; the paint flaked off almost immediately under field conditions and failed to protect the rifle's exposed metal surfaces from rust or corrosion.

In 1974, responding to multiple complaints from the PLA, the Chinese government carried out a program to improve quality control and improve the manufacture of the stamped receivers and pinned barrels. However, the accuracy of the Type 63 had been permanently affected by the changes to the receiver and barrel design, and it remained much less accurate than the SKS it was supposed to replace. The receivers also continued to suffer fractures and cracks under routine field conditions.

In 1978, the PLA ordered the Type 63 withdrawn from general service, and production was formally discontinued. The Type 63 production line was reassigned and re-tooled for the production of the SKS/Type 56 carbine, and the PLA units which had previously been issued the Type 63 were re-issued with the older weapon.

In 1979, some newly reworked and upgraded Type 63s were delivered on a limited basis to select PLA units for the Sino-Vietnamese War. These rifles had redesigned bolts, recoil springs, and firing pins, and were modified to accept standard AK magazines. Despite positive field reports concerning their performance, they were again withdrawn from service at the war's end.

A number of elements of the Type 63 design, namely the unique gas regulator, were later incorporated into the design of the Type 81 assault rifle.

=== Service ===
The Type 63 entered service with the PLA in 1969, and for the first two years of production the weapon remained favorably evaluated by Chinese infantry troops. However, an increasing number of complaints emerged from the PLA during the mid 1970s, namely that the Type 63 was inaccurate and often failed to hold zero. Other common complaints concerned the brittle nature of the parts, and injuries caused by malfunctions in the gas regulators. By the late 1970s, the PLA general staff in nine Chinese military regions had rejected the Type 63 and requested an alternative service rifle, citing concerns over the rifle's poor accuracy. The Type 63 was formally withdrawn from service in 1978 due to these complaints, and the affected units re-armed with older SKS/Type 56 carbines. All existing Type 63s were relegated to storage, or passed to the Chinese militia.

In 1979, with PLA forces suffering from a shortage of automatic weapons in the Sino-Vietnamese War, a small number of Type 63s were returned to service. To simplify logistics, these were not issued with their proprietary magazines but modified to accept the same magazine as the Type 56 assault rifle. They were withdrawn from service again when the war ended.

China exported small quantities of Type 63s as military aid to North Vietnam during the Vietnam War. Others were supplied to the Khmer Rouge in neighboring Cambodia. Khmer Rouge forces used Type 63s during the Cambodian–Vietnamese War. The primary operator for the Type 63 outside Asia was Albania, which received a large number of the rifles during the 1970s. Some were also exported to Afghanistan and unidentified African nations. The Kosovo Liberation Army used Type 63s, likely acquired through Albania, during the Kosovo War.

== Design ==
The Type 63 is a gas-operated, select-fire assault rifle with a conventional wooden stock and the ability to accept proprietary 15 and 20 round magazines. If the bolt stop is removed, or ground down, it can accept the same standard AK-pattern magazines as the Type 56 assault rifle. A Type 63 with a seated magazine can be loaded from an SKS stripper clip seated in the bolt carrier. The Type 63's receiver and barrel are closely modeled on those of the SKS, but the bolt action is based on that of the AK-47. It has a two-piece gas regulator that can generate sparks when the weapon is fired, necessitating the use of a protective sleeve on later models. The gas regulator is usually set with the smaller of two holes closer to the barrel. The larger hole is used to increase gas flow, and can be selected simply by pressing the regulator retainer towards the gas tube.

When a round is discharged, some of the propellant gas passes through the vent and into the gas tube above the barrel. This forces the piston back, and the bolt carrier is driven rearwards and rotates the hammer back. After traveling six millimeters, a cam cut in the bolt carrier reaches the operating lug of the bolt, causing it to rotate, extracting the spent cartridge. When the bolt carrier hits the rear of the receiver it rebounds, and the next round is chambered. The extractor secures the rim of the next cartridge as the bolt returns forward. The bolt carrier cam then acts on the operating lug, rotating it into the locked position.

There are three fire selector markings on the right side of the receiver: "0" (safety), "1" (semi-automatic fire), and "2" (fully automatic fire"). The Type 63's trigger safety is engaged by rotating the selector to the rearmost "0", although the bolt can still be released.

Each Type 63 is fitted with a folding spike bayonet similar to that of the Type 56 carbine. The handle is forced back against a spring, freeing the bayonet to rotate forward and be locked into place at the muzzle.

== Users ==
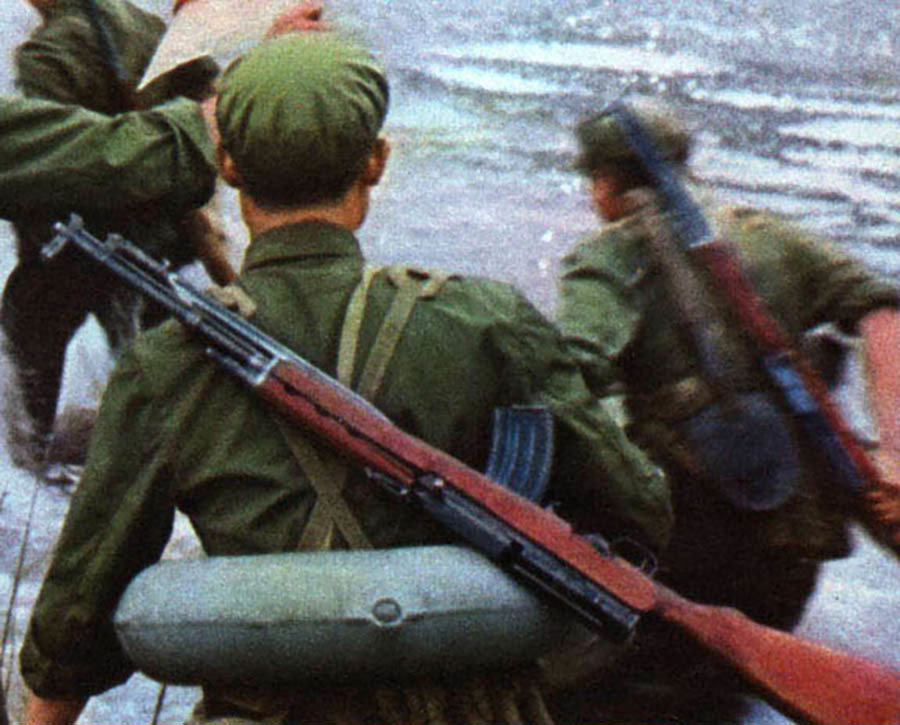
A group of Chinese soldiers armed with Type 63 rifles.

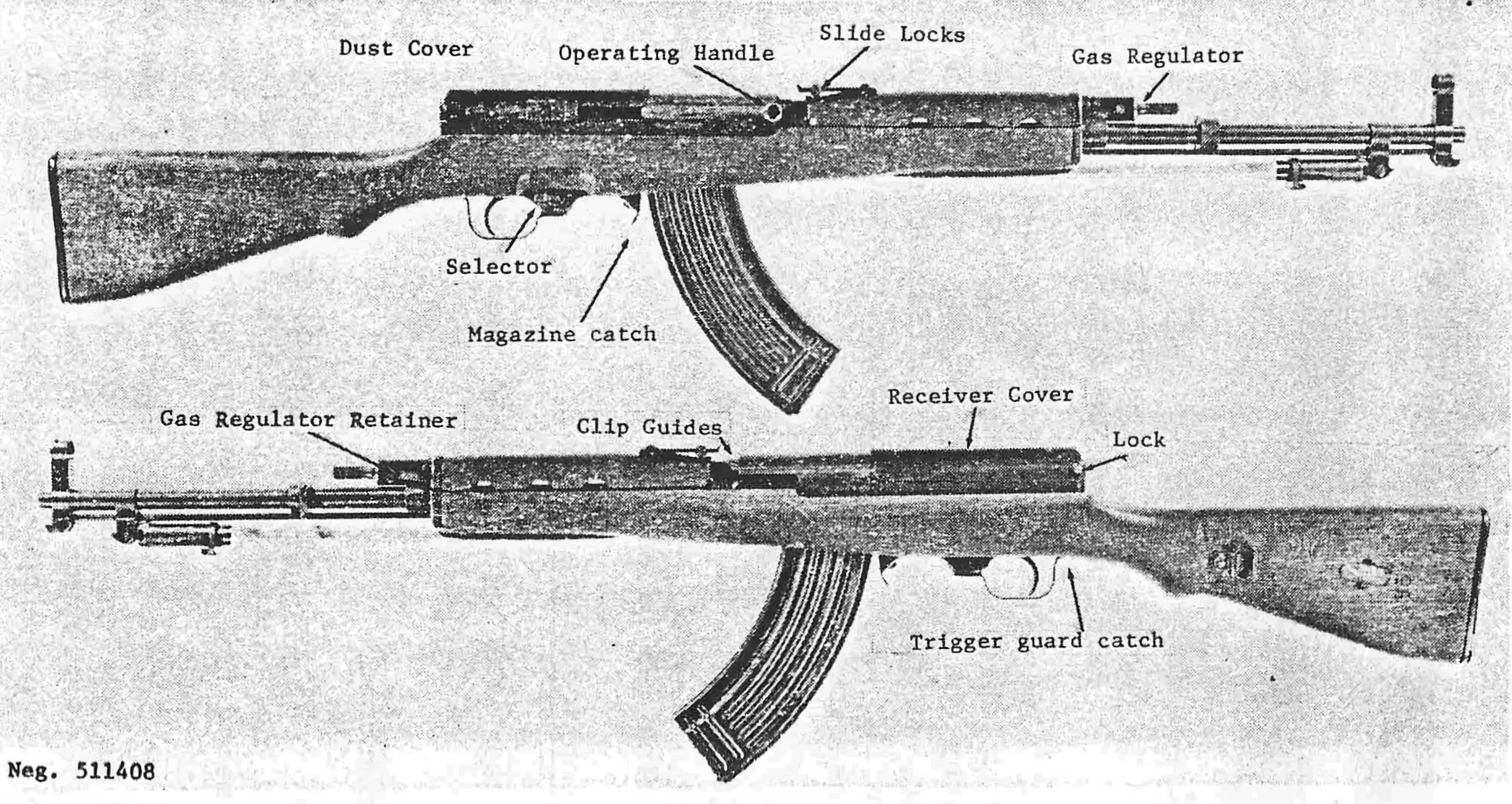
Picture of a Type 63 rifle acquired by the Defense Intelligence Agency for a 1983 "Eurasian Communist Country" Small Arms Identification publication (mislabeled as Type 68).

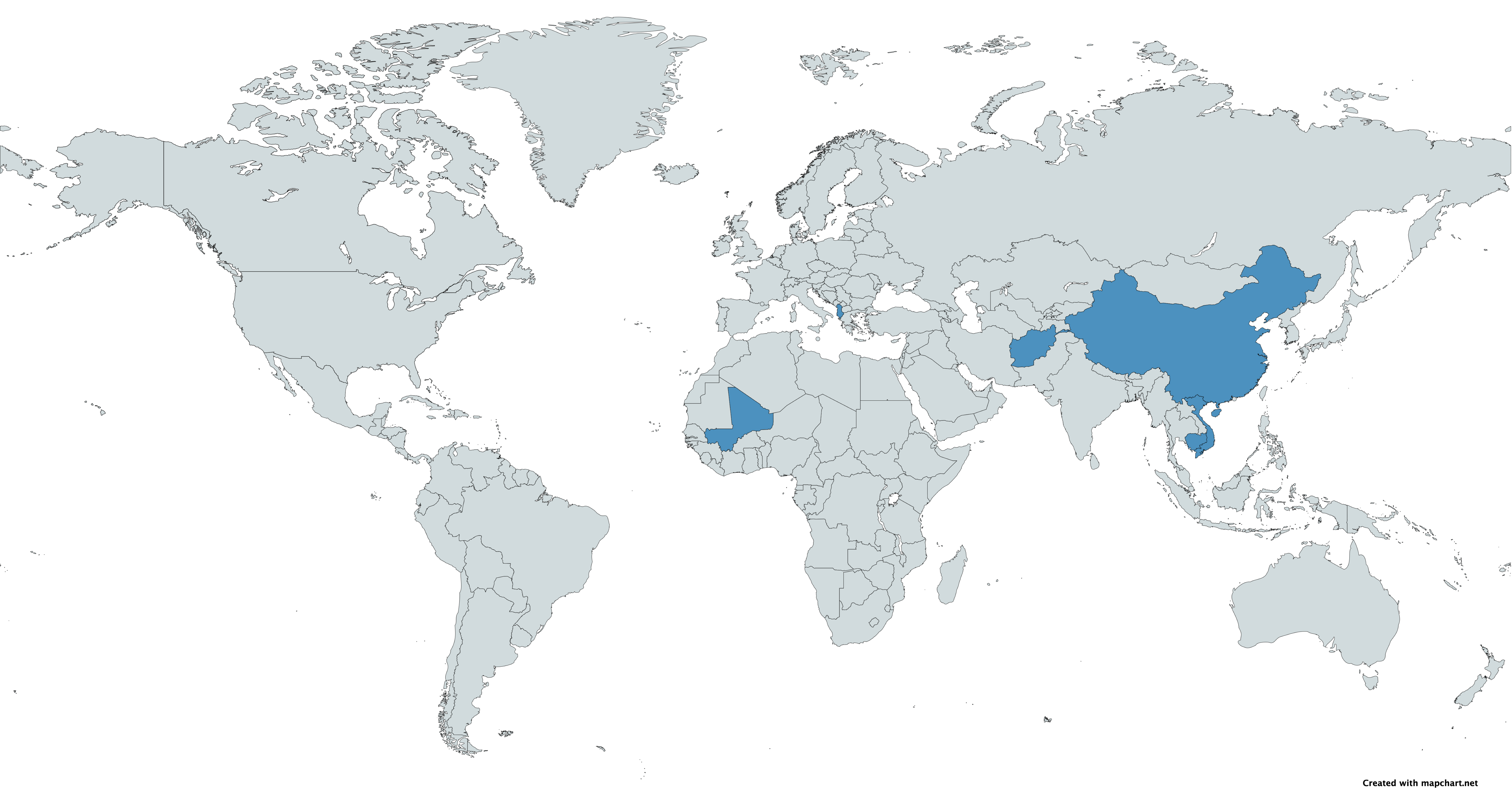
A map with users of the Type 63 assault rifle in blue

- Albania
- Madagascar
- Myanmar
- Sri Lanka
- Togo
- Uganda
- Vietnam: In Vietnamese service, the rifle is designated K63.
- Zimbabwe

=== Non-state actors ===
- Kosovo Liberation Army
- People's Defence Force
- People's Movement for the Liberation of Azawad
- Uganda People's Democratic Army

=== Former users ===
- People's Democratic Republic of Ethiopia
- Democratic Kampuchea

== See also ==
- 701 rifle
