= Remington R51 =

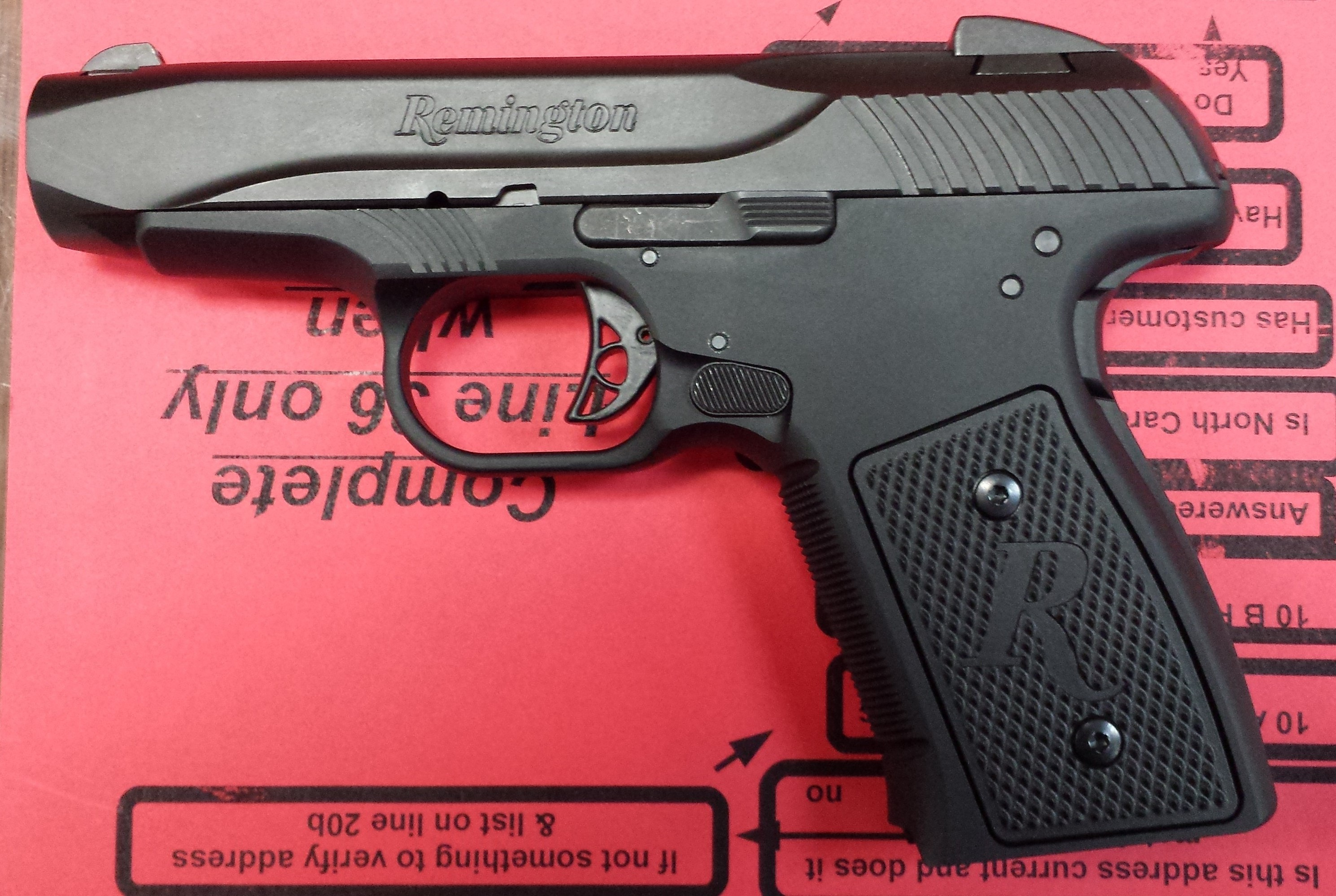
- Type: Semi-automatic pistol
- Place of origin: United States

Production history
- Designer: John Pedersen (action)
- Manufacturer: Remington Arms
- Produced: 2014–2018
- Variants: All Black All Black with Crimson Trace Laser Two-tone Smoke

Specifications
- Mass: 22 oz (620 g)
- Length: 6.6 in (17 cm)
- Barrel length: 3.4 in (8.6 cm)
- Width: 1.0 in (2.5 cm)
- Height: 4.6 in (12 cm)
- Cartridge: 9×19mm Parabellum +P
- Action: Pedersen "hesitation-locked" action
- Rate of fire: Semi-automatic
- Feed system: 7-round box magazine
- Sights: Drift-adjustable 3-dot iron sights

The Remington R51 is a semi-automatic pistol announced in late 2013 by Remington Arms and was available to the market in January 2014. The R51 is a modernized version of the John Pedersen-designed Remington Model 51 pistol now chambered in 9×19mm +P caliber. Remington announced plans to offer the pistol in .40 S&W and other calibers. However, no other chamberings were offered by the time of Remington's bankruptcy in 2018.

== Design details ==
Pedersen's layout of the Remington R51 is copied from the Walther PPK pistol using a stationary barrel and recoil spring surrounding the barrel. However, a notable design feature is the use of a locking breech block within the slide utilizing the "hesitation-locked" action originally developed by John Pedersen. When the pistol is in battery, the breech block rests slightly forward of the locking shoulder in the frame. When the cartridge is fired, the bolt and slide move together a short distance rearward powered by the energy of the cartridge as in a standard blowback system. When the breech block meets the locking shoulder, it stops, locking the breech. The slide continues rearward with the momentum it acquired in the initial phase. This delay allows chamber pressure to drop while the breech remains locked and the cartridge slightly extracted. Once the bullet leaves the muzzle and the pressure drops, the rearward motion of the slide lifts the breech block from its locking recess through a sliding cam arrangement, continuing the operating cycle. The slide may only open when it is manually operated with the grip safety depressed, or when firing a cartridge.

Because the action halts cartridge extraction momentarily while holding locked the breech, the R51 is designed to use higher pressure cartridges (9mm Luger +P) than a straight blowback firearm with similar slide weight. The hesitation-locked Model 53 was based on the Model 51 design, and was built by Remington in .45 ACP for Navy trials. The Pedersen design has the recoil spring surrounding the barrel, reducing the pistol's overall profile. Lighter operating parts and longer lock time provide less felt and actual recoil. The R51's low bore axis gives less muzzle rise which also lowers perceived recoil, while the stationary barrel improves accuracy and simplifies construction.

Like the original the new Remington R51 uses an internal hammer with a built-in drop safety and features a single-action trigger. The slide stop is mostly recessed into the left side of the frame. The primary safety is a grip safety which must be depressed before the pistol will fire. The R51 lacks the magazine safety that was present on the original model 51. The trigger guard is undercut to allow a higher grip on the frame. The frame has a 20-degree grip angle designed for natural point shooting, and has checkering on the front strap for improved grip of the gun. The R51 comes standard with polymer grip panels which are held on with conventional torx screws. Remington plans to offer optional rubber and rosewood grip panels as accessories for users desiring a wider, more hand-filling grip. The magazine is a steel single-column design with a polymer floorplate. Capacity is 7 rounds in 9×19mm +P. The magazine release is ambidextrous. The slide of the R51 is machined from stainless steel and has a matte black FNC finish, while the frame is machined from 7075 aluminum alloy and has a matte black or smoke gray anodized finish. The 3.4" barrel is machined from 416 stainless steel and has a bright finish.

== Production ==
The model R51 was designed and developed in Remington's R&D center in Lexington, KY from 2012 to 2013. Initial production took place in Pineville, a suburb of Charlotte, North Carolina at Para USA, one of Remington's family of brands in late 2013. In March 2015 all production was moved from North Carolina to Remington's new headquarters in Huntsville, Alabama. Even though production was moved to Huntsville, frames were still marked Charlotte, NC. It was not until 2017 that R51 frames were marked as being made in Huntsville, AL. In the fall of 2017, Remington introduced a new variant two-tone color scheme shown in the 2018 Remington catalog as "Smoke". It had a gray anodized finished frame. The slide and grips are the same black finish. Production for the R51 came to a close after Remington quickly emerged from their 2018 Chapter 11 bankruptcy. In July 2020 Remington filed again for Chapter 11 bankruptcy protection and the company was sold off in September 2020.

=== Production problems ===
A press release from Remington in July 2014 said that production of the R51 had been suspended and was expected to resume in October. Customers had informed Remington "that some R51 pistols had performance issues," some serious. Remington determined that these "performance problems resulted from complications during our transition from prototype to mass production." In June 2016, Remington announced it was ready to ship new pistols to those who had returned their R51s for repair and / or replacement.

== Reception ==
Recoil criticised the R51 for being unreliable and uncomfortable to shoot and operate. However, they praised its compact size and "inspired aesthetic", saying that "for a couple hundred bucks, this gun is totally worth it." Similarly, American Rifleman complained of poor quality magazines which often failed to load properly, but noted its good accuracy and modest price.

The Firearm Blog was more critical, claiming that for a weapon of its size, a 7-round magazine capacity was too small, and it was much too difficult to field strip: "taking the R51 apart for cleaning might be the worst experience of my life, but it's a one time affair. After you field strip the R51 for the first time, I promise you will either sell the gun, or just run it dirty until it kicks the bucket." The Firearm Blog owed most of the R51's problems to its grip safety, which would pull the shooter's aim down and towards the right, and mentioned that the first 200 rounds were a "disgrace", with many malfunctions, including the magazine falling out, failure to feed, failure to extract and stovepipes, and claimed "I don't think I've ever shot something that was quite so uncomfortable."

== Generation 2 ==
After the voluntary recall in 2014, Remington went back to the drawing board to fix the issues reported by critics and owners. Some of the reported malfunctions include failure to feed, failure to go completely into battery, failure to extract, failure to eject, magazine pops out after first shot of 7+1, magazine base plate too flimsy, pins drift loose, sights not secure, poor machining on slide and breech block causing jams and rough action. Nearly two years later, on 23 June 2016 Remington began to ship the new updated version, commonly known as "Gen 2", to original owners that sent their handguns in for replacement. On 12 August 2016 Remington began the retail roll-out of the Gen 2 model to consumers.

In the 2017 Remington catalog the R51 was shown to have the following "enhanced" features: Enhanced slide operation - updated internals ensure superior slide performance and smooth function, Precision engineered extractor - built to withstand abuse, extractor precisely engages case rim for sure and forceful extraction and ejection, Snag-free sights - locking snag free sights for fast target acquisition, Finely-tuned recoil spring - force-balanced for impeccable slide feel and positive closure into battery, Action spring bushing - hard chromed action spring bushing for extreme durability, Superior trigger - crisp, single action trigger improves shootability and enhanced accuracy.

A distinguishable change that distinguishes a Gen 2 from a Gen 1 is the location of the R51 logo now located closer to the ejection port. Another is that the Gen 2 sights have set screws. Gen 2 magazines have been revised to have a ramp on the follower as well as a thicker base plate. One item that Remington failed to correct was to shorten the legs of the magazine follower. This simple fix, left up to R51 owners, corrects the failure to feed issue that the R51 suffered from.

== See also ==
- 701 rifle
- List of delayed blowback firearms
