= Field strip =

Firearms terminology for firearm disassembly

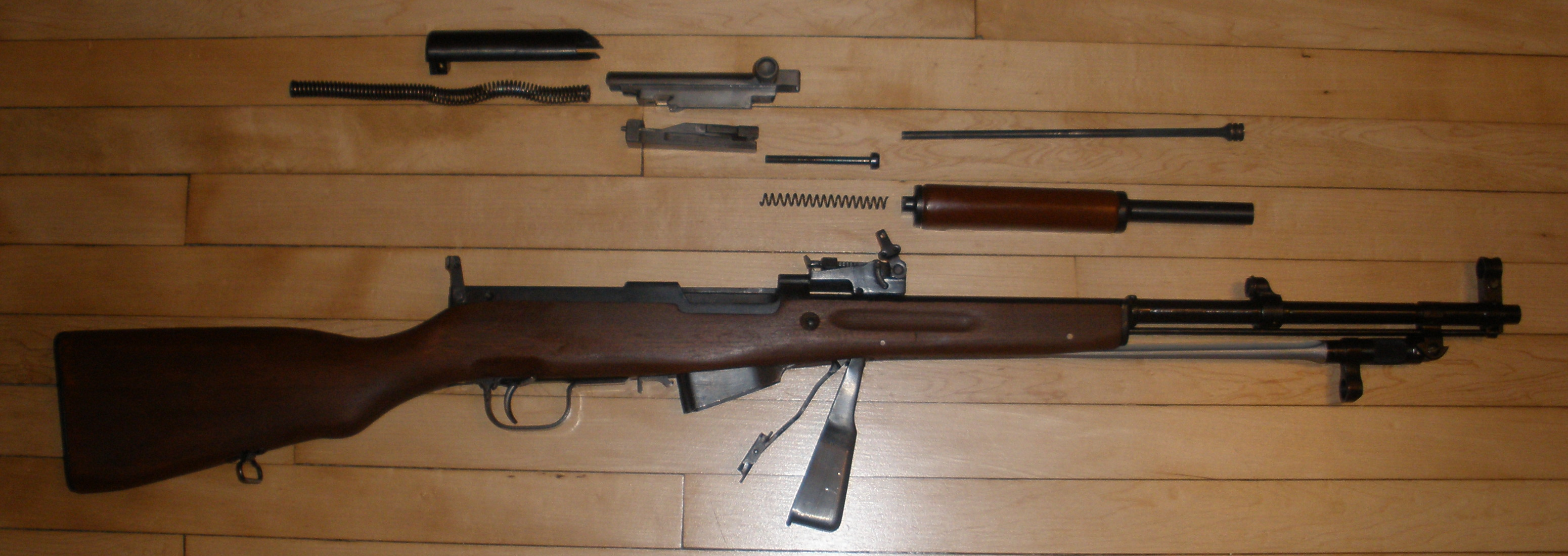
A field stripped SKS.

Field stripping is firearms terminology for the act of disassembling a firearm to the greatest possible extent without the usage of any extra tools. A disassembly that uses such tools is called a detail strip, but this is less common than a field strip, as the latter is usually sufficient for most cases.

== Definition ==
Field strips are done to facilitate cleaning, or identify damages. It is customary for soldiers to be taught how to conduct a field strip, both as a means of discipline, and to help create a sense of familiarity with the weapon. Because it is an integral part of owning and using a firearm, especially in a military context, firearm manufacturers will take considerations to make field strips expedient and simple. In one instance, the Los Angeles Police Department opted against the purchase of Thompson submachine guns primarily because other available weapons were easier to field strip.

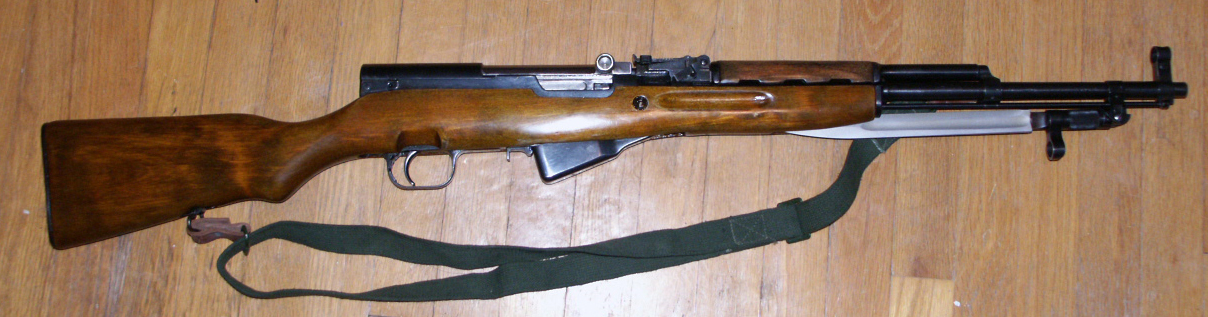
A fully assembled SKS. The receiver cover is in the way of the recoil spring, preventing it from being cleaned.

== Rationale ==
When fully assembled, a gun is not very suitable for cleaning, and like any machine, will need to be frequently cleaned and maintained in order to stay in optimal condition. Very few of its parts can be accessed unless it has been field stripped, and most of those parts can only be partially seen. Instead, when field stripped, it can be inspected or cleaned more thoroughly, as individual parts can be separated. A field strip may also reveal issues that otherwise cannot be seen, such as cracks or deformities, but excessive cleaning may further induce wear on the weapon.
