= 701 rifle =

- Type: Assault rifle
- Place of origin: China

Service history
- In service: Prototype only

Production history
- Designer: Deng Fuzhang and Guo Ming
- Designed: 1966-1972
- Manufacturer: 208th Research Institute

Specifications
- Mass: 3.2kg
- Length: 1360mm (Bayonet open); 1070mm (Bayonet folded)
- Cartridge: 7.62×39mm
- Action: cartridge short-recoil operation
- Feed system: 10/20 -round detachable box magazine

The 701 rifle (701 突击步枪) was a prototype assault rifle intended to rival the Type 63 in the 66-136 programme.

== Design ==
Hesitation-locked delayed blowback operation with rotating bolt

The 701 rifle uses an unusual cartridge short-recoil operation (not to be confused with recoil operation as it uses a fixed barrel) in conjunction with an annular chamber groove to seal the chamber. When firing, the cartridge sets back a short distance of 1.1-1.5mm to a stop and the bolt carrier continues to recoil due to inertia, unlocking the rotating bolt.
