= M1907 =

M1907 may refer to:

- M1907 Carbine variant of the Mosin–Nagant
- M1907 Carbine variant of the Krag–Jørgensen
- Dreyse M1907 pistol
- Roth–Steyr M1907 pistol
- Schwarzlose M1907/12 machine gun
- St. Étienne Mle 1907 or "M1907"
- M1907 variant of the Presstoff pistol holder
- M1907 pistol made by Husqvarna Vapenfabrik
- Winchester Model 1907
- 14-inch gun M1907 - a US Army artillery piece

== See also ==
- M7 (disambiguation)
