= Volkspistole =

Volkspistole (People's Pistol)
- Type: Semi-Automatic Pistol
- Place of origin: Nazi Germany

Service history
- In service: 1945
- Used by: -

Production history
- Designer: Various
- Designed: 1944 -1945
- Manufacturer: Carl Walther GmbH; Mauser-Werke; Gustloff-Werke
- Produced: 1945
- No. built: ~12 or 24 (estimated)

Specifications
- Mass: 1.088 kg (2.40 lb)
- Length: 215 mm (8.5 in)
- Barrel length: 128 mm (5.0 in)
- Height: 140 mm (5.5 in)
- Cartridge: 9×19mm Parabellum
- Barrels: Rifled (Mauser); Smoothbore (Gustloff); Rotating barrel (Walther)
- Action: Blowback
- Rate of fire: 116 rpm (Walther) (estimated); 119 rpm (Mauser) (estimated); 109 rpm (Gustloff) (estimated)
- Muzzle velocity: 381 m/s (1,250 ft/s)
- Effective firing range: 50 m (160 ft)
- Maximum firing range: 75 m (246 ft)
- Feed system: 8 round detachable box magazine
- Sights: Iron sights

The Volkspistole ('People's Pistol') was a prototype pistol produced by Carl Walther GmbH, Mauser-Werke and Gustloff-Werke in 1945 for an emergency German pistol design to help mitigate the loss of pistols before the war's end in Europe.

== History ==
In the first half of 1944, the German troops had lost more than 110,000 pistols, when the project started (by the end of the year, an additional 170,000 had been lost), as Carl Walther GmbH, Mauser, and Spreewerk, the three major producers of the current service pistol, the Walther P38, could not produce P38s fast enough to account for their losses. It was to be assembled from simple steel pressings with a minimum of machined parts and to be used by the Volkssturm. Only prototypes were produced before the end of World War II. These prototypes had various unusual locking systems to figure out a cheaper design than the short recoil action of the P38. They also all reused the P38's magazine, another pivotal point in the plan's goal for low-cost production. Three prototypes were designed by Walther, Mauser and Gustloff-Werke, and all three failed. These prototypes had slightly different actions:

- For the Walther design, a rotating barrel design, extremely unique for the time, and only seen on a handful of modern handguns, such as the Beretta Px4 Storm. The original design failed, and Walther soon switched to a milled slide, contrary to the specifications of the program.
- For the Gustloff-Werke design, they simply submitted a 9×19mm redesign of a previous (also failed) simple blowback prototype of Gustloff-Werke's for the 7.65×21mm Parabellum cartridge designed for the original Luger pistol. While it is rumored that five Gustloff-Werke examples were made, there is no primary source, and no currently remaining designs exist. Gustloff-Werke never designed a successful firearm (their only other major designs being the Volkssturmgewehr and the first pistol), and their only contribution to firearms mainly focused on concentration camp slave labor producing Karabiner 98k.
- Mauser had been working in 1943 and early 1944 on a simpler weapon to replace the P38 under the project name M.7057. Valuable lessons had already been learned from simplifying the Mauser HSc pistol which received a simplified trigger and a sheet metal slide. When the official request came from the military authorities for a simple pistol chambered in 9 mm, Mauser developed a blowback weapon with the simplest fashioning of the individual parts. The Mauser pistol took about 30% fewer working hours and about 20% less raw material to produce than the P38. Testing took place at the end of 1944 which revealed issues with the double-action trigger pull. Mauser started working on new models but it is unclear if any were completed by the end of the war.
