= Dreyse =

Dreyse may refer to:

- Johann Nicolaus von Dreyse (1787–1867), German firearms inventor
- Hitch Dreyse, a fictional character in Attack on Titan (Shingeki no Kyojin) series who serves in the military police.
- Dreyse needle gun, a German service rifle 1841-1873
- Dreyse M1907, a German semi-automatic pistol 1907-1945
- Waffenfabrik von Dreyse, a firearms manufacturing company taken over in 1901 by Rheinische Metallwaaren- und Maschinenfabrik Sömmerda; later, Rheinmetall
