= Walther HP =

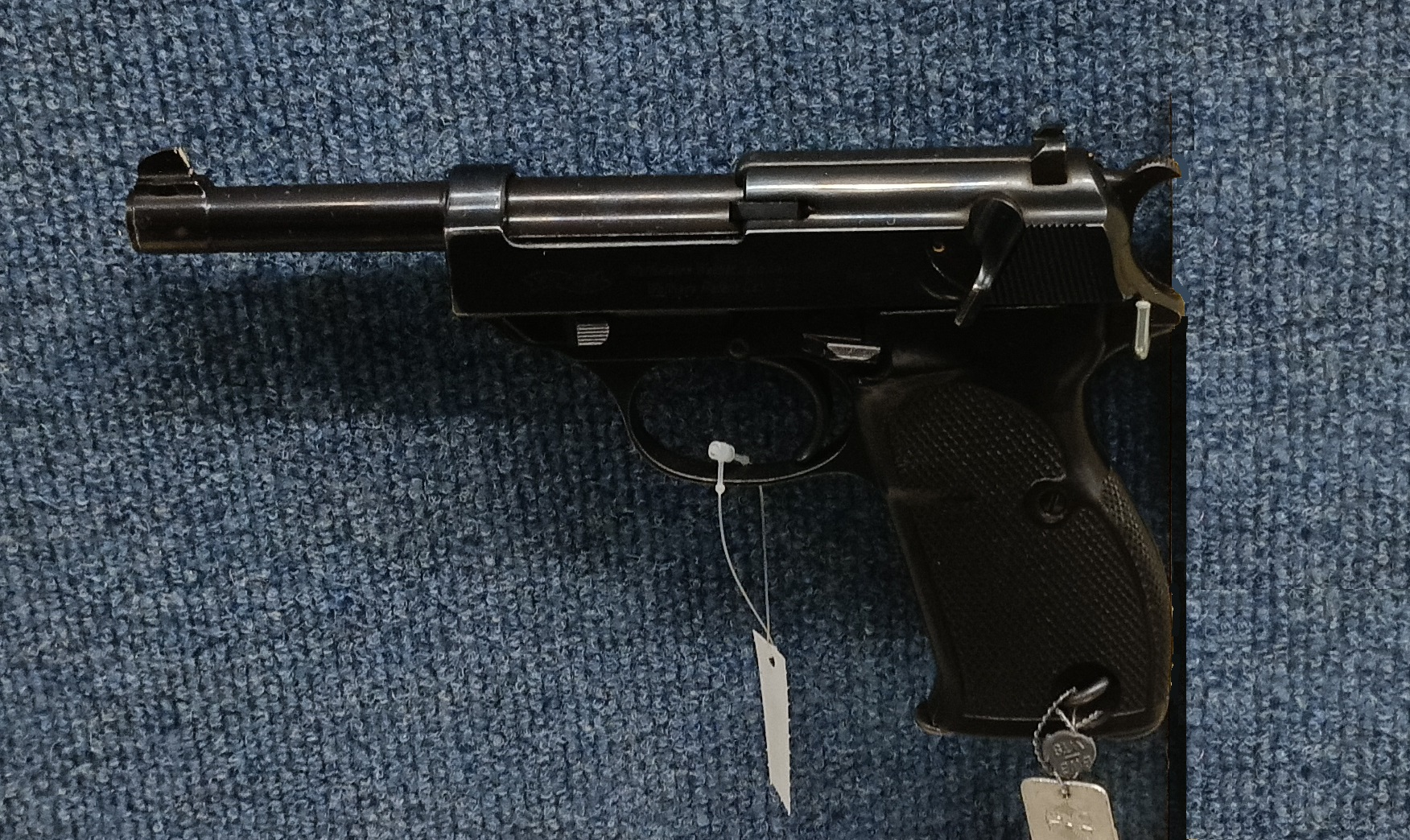
- Walther HP in the Bundeswehr Museum of German Defense Technology
- Type: Semi-automatic pistol
- Place of origin: Germany

Service history
- Used by: Swedish Armed Forces

Production history
- No. built: 30,000

Specifications
- Caliber: 9×19mm 7.65×21mm Parabellum (very rare)
- Feed system: Detachable 8 round single-stack magazine
- Sights: Blade front sight, non-adjustable notch rear sight

The Walther HP (Heerespistole) was a pre-war commercial version of what would later become the Walther P38.

== Description ==
About 30,000 Walther HP pistols were produced. The vast majority were chambered in 9×19mm, but several hundred were also produced in .30 Luger and are very rare and desirable today. The Walther HP was exported to Sweden in 1939 where it was adopted as the new service pistol (as Pistol m/39) of the Swedish Armed Forces. At the outbreak of World War II sales of the pistol were stopped after only 1500 pistols had been delivered so the Husqvarna m/40 was adopted instead.
