= M7 =

M7, M-7, or M.7 may refer to:

== Transportation ==
=== Air ===
- M7 Aerospace, a United States aerospace company
- Macchi M.7, an Italian flying boat fighter in service from 1923 to 1930
- Miles M.7 Nighthawk, a 1930s British training and communications monoplane
- Maule M-7, an American single-engine light aircraft
- Marsland Aviation (IATA code), a Sudanese airline
- Tropical Airways (IATA code), a defunct small airline based in Haiti

=== Rail ===
- M7 (Istanbul Metro), a metro line in Istanbul, Turkey
- LSWR M7 class, a steam locomotive
- M7 (railcar), a Long Island Rail Road and Metro-North Railroad railcar
- NMBS/SNCB M7 railcar, a National Railway Company of Belgium (NMBS/SNCB) railcar
- Sri Lanka Railways M7, diesel-electric locomotives

=== Road ===
- M7 (New York City bus), a New York City Bus route in Manhattan
- Westlink M7, an urban motorway in the Sydney, Australia area
- Metroad 7 (Brisbane) (M7), an urban motorway in Brisbane, Australia
- M-7 (Michigan highway), the former designation of M-86, a state highway in Michigan
- M7 (East London), a Metropolitan Route in East London, South Africa
- M7 (Cape Town), a Metropolitan Route in Cape Town, South Africa
- M7 (Johannesburg), a Metropolitan Route in Johannesburg, South Africa
- M7 (Pretoria), a Metropolitan Route in Pretoria, South Africa
- M7 (Durban), a Metropolitan Route in Durban, South Africa
- M7 (Port Elizabeth), a Metropolitan Route in Port Elizabeth, South Africa
- M7 motorway (Ireland), a motorway in Ireland
- M7 motorway (Hungary), a motorway in Hungary
- M7 highway (Russia), the Volga Highway in Russia
- Highway M07 (Ukraine)
- M7 road (Malawi), a road in Malawi
- M7 road (Zambia), a road in Zambia
- Chery Arrizo M7, a compact minivan
- AITO M7, an electric full-size SUV
- Geely Galaxy M7, a plug-in hybrid compact crossover SUV

== Military ==
- M7 grenade launcher, an American World War II era rifle grenade launcher
- M7 Priest, an American self-propelled artillery vehicle
- M7 bayonet, a United States military bayonet
- M7 mine, a United States anti-tank mine
- M7 snow tractor
- M-7, a Chinese tactical ballistic missile; See S-75 Dvina
- Medium Tank M7, a tank design project conceived as an up-gunned replacement for the M3/M5 Stuart
- M7 rifle, a U.S. Army assault rifle

== Technology ==
- Apple M7, a dedicated motion co-processor accompanying the Apple A7 SoC
- HTC One (2013) or HTC M7, HTC's 2013 high-end flagship smartphone
- Intel m7, a brand of microprocessors
- Leica M7, a Leica rangefinder camera
- SPARC M7, an upcoming computer chip by Oracle
- M7, one of the 1N400x general-purpose diodes

== Other uses ==
- "M7", a shorthand reference to Yoweri Museveni, President of Uganda
- Messier 7, an open star cluster in the constellation Scorpius
- Major seventh
- Major seventh chord
- M7 (perfume), a men's fragrance produced by Yves Saint Laurent
- M7 Group, a Luxembourg-based satellite TV provider for several European countries
- M7, a difficulty grade in mixed climbing
- M7 Education, charity co-founded by Miniminter
- MLBB M7 World Championship, the seventh Mobile Legends: Bang Bang World Championship held in 2026 at the conclusion of the 2025 season

== See also ==
- 7M (disambiguation)
- M1907 (disambiguation)
