= Volkssturmgewehr =

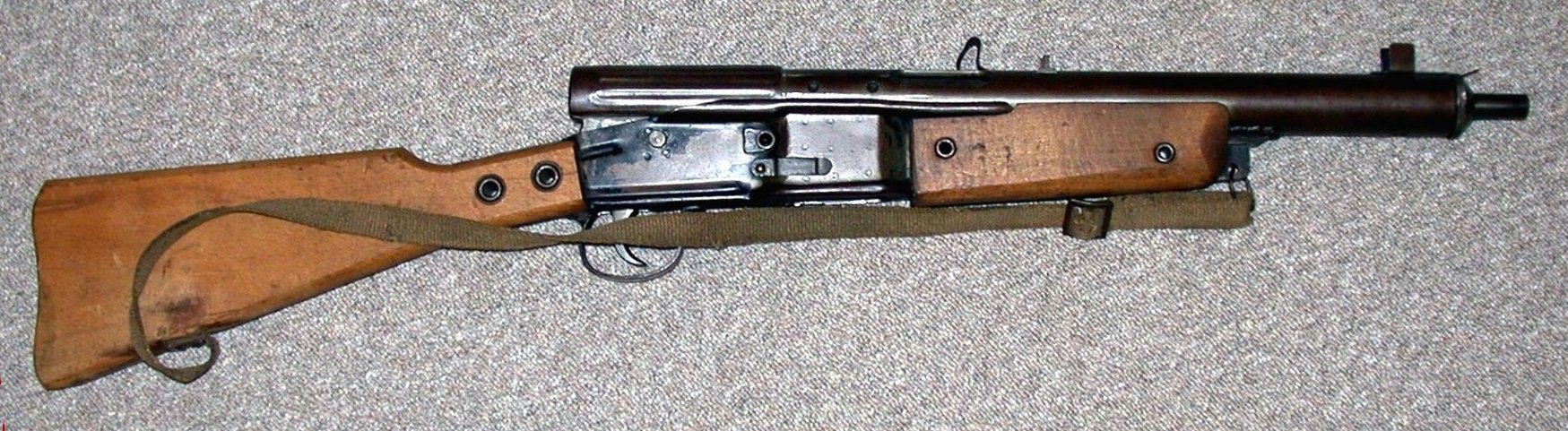
- Gustloff Volkssturmgewehr VG
- Type: Semi-automatic rifle
- Place of origin: Nazi Germany

Service history
- In service: February–May 1945
- Used by: Nazi Germany
- Wars: World War II

Production history
- Designed: Late 1944
- Produced: January–May 1945
- No. built: Approx. 10,000 Gustloff Volkssturmgewehr
- Variants: Selective fire variant

Specifications
- Mass: 4.6 kg (10.1 lb)
- Length: 885 mm (34.8 in)
- Barrel length: 378 mm (14.9 in)
- Cartridge: 7.92×33mm Kurz
- Action: Gas-delayed blowback
- Muzzle velocity: 660 m/s (2,200 ft/s)
- Effective firing range: 300 m
- Feed system: 30-round detachable StG 44 box magazine
- Sights: Iron

The Volkssturmgewehr (lit. 'People's Storm Rifle') is the name of several rifle designs developed by Nazi Germany during the final months of World War II (February 1945-May 1945). They share the common characteristic of being greatly simplified as to adapt with the severe lack of resources and industrial capacity in Germany during the final stages of the war. The Volkspistole was a partner program, almost identical, but for pistols instead.

The weapon's name can be translated directly either as "People's assault rifle" or "Volkssturm rifle." Volkssturm, the German late war militia home defense force, means "People's Assault"; Sturmgewehr translates as "assault rifle".

== Primitiv-Waffen-Programm ==
As a last-ditch measure in the nearly lost war, on 18 October 1944 the Deutscher Volkssturm was mobilized – a German national militia. To arm them under conditions of depleted manpower and limited available production capacities the Primitiv-Waffen-Programm ("primitive weapons program") was initiated. It called for weapons that were as easy as possible to produce. Walther designed the Volkssturmgewehr VG 1 rifle, Spreewerk Berlin the VG 2, Rheinmetall the VG 3, Mauser the VG 4 and Steyr the VG 5 (a.k.a. VK 98). Best known is the Volkssturmgewehr by Gustloff which was a gas-delayed blowback semi-automatic rifle.

== VG 1, 2 and 5 ==
=== VG 1 ===
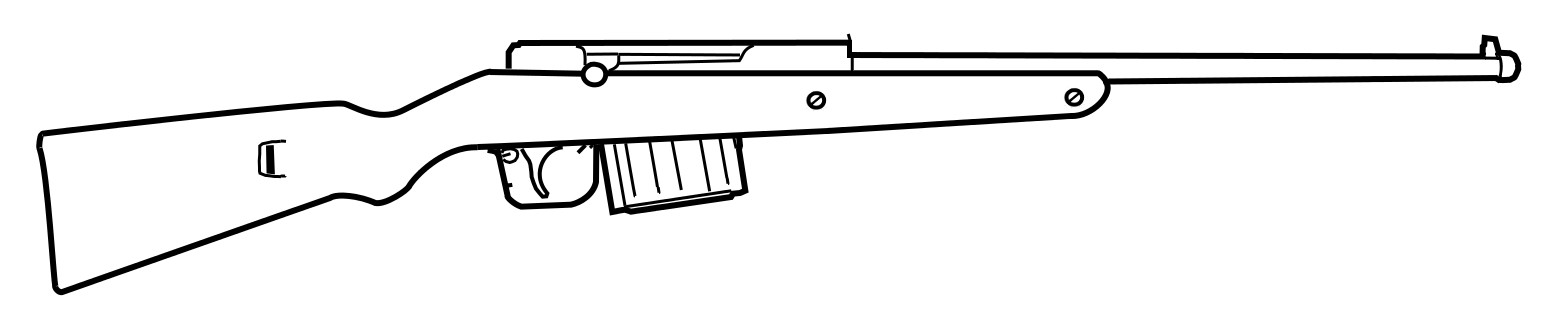
VG1

The Walther Volkssturmgewehr VG 1 is a manually operated bolt-action rifle. It uses a simple rotating bolt, with locking provided by the two frontal lugs; the crude bolt handle engages a cut in the cast steel receiver to provide additional safety. The feed is from detachable 10-round box magazines, originally developed for the Gewehr 43 rifle. The manual safety is also very crude, and consists of a stamped steel lever pinned to the trigger guard just behind the trigger. When engaged, the safety lever blocks trigger movement. To disengage the safety the user must turn it sideways with a finger. The stock is crudely made from wood, and non-adjustable iron sights are provided for close-range shooting only. It was meant to be produced by Zbrojovka Brno in the current-day Czech Republic.

=== VG 2 ===
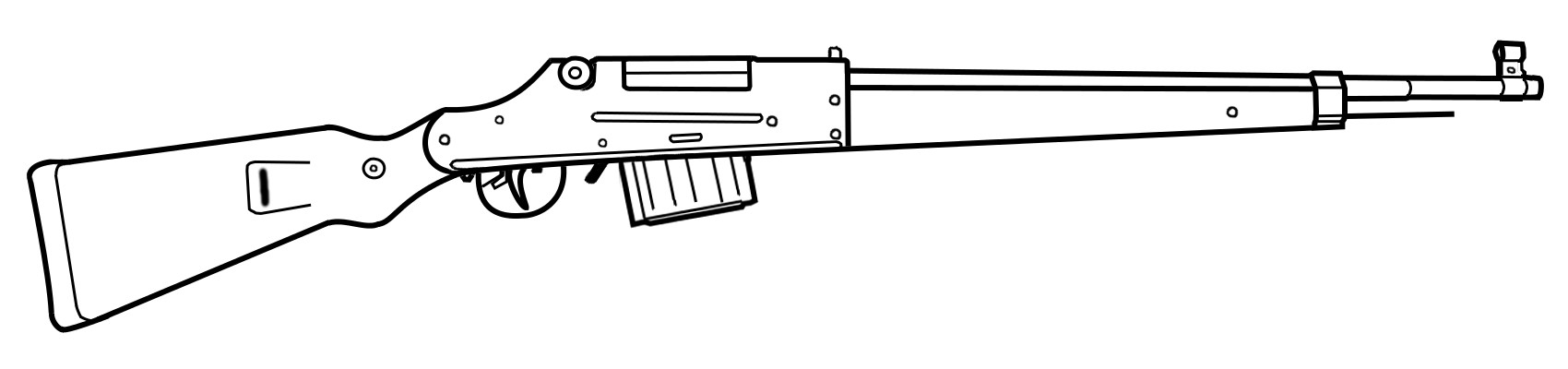
VG2

The Spreewerk Berlin Volkssturmgewehr VG 2 is also a manually operated bolt-action rifle with a similar rotating bolt and crude manual safety. Locking is provided by two frontal lugs which lock into the steel insert pinned inside the stamped steel receiver. The VG 2 rifle is fed from detachable box magazines, originally developed for Gewehr 43. The stock is crudely made from wood and consists of two separate parts: shoulder stock with semi-pistol grip and fore-end. Wood parts are permanently pinned to the receiver. Non-adjustable iron sights are provided for close-range shooting only, and zeroed for 100 metres (110 yd).

=== VG 5 ===
The Steyr Volkssturmgewehr VG 5 rifle (or more correctly, the Volkssturmkarabiner VK 98) was slightly less basic. It used the Mauser Gewehr 98 type bolt action with rotary bolt, some of the early guns actually had serialised Kar98k bolts and/or receivers probably sourced from parts storages or rejected from main production for some reasons. Later guns had more parts produced specifically for VG5, these were standard K98k parts, but of very low quality, they were obviously distinguishable by virtually lacking any finish. The barrels were actually all K98k standard barrels. It had an internal magazine, just like K98k, though with simpler unremovable bottom plate, very basic unadjustable fixed sights and very simple short stock, making it indeed a simplified and low quality sporter stocked K98k.

These rifle prototypes were developed as part of the Volkssturm-Mehrladegewehr ("People's Assault Repeating Rifle") program.

== Gustloff Volkssturmgewehr ==
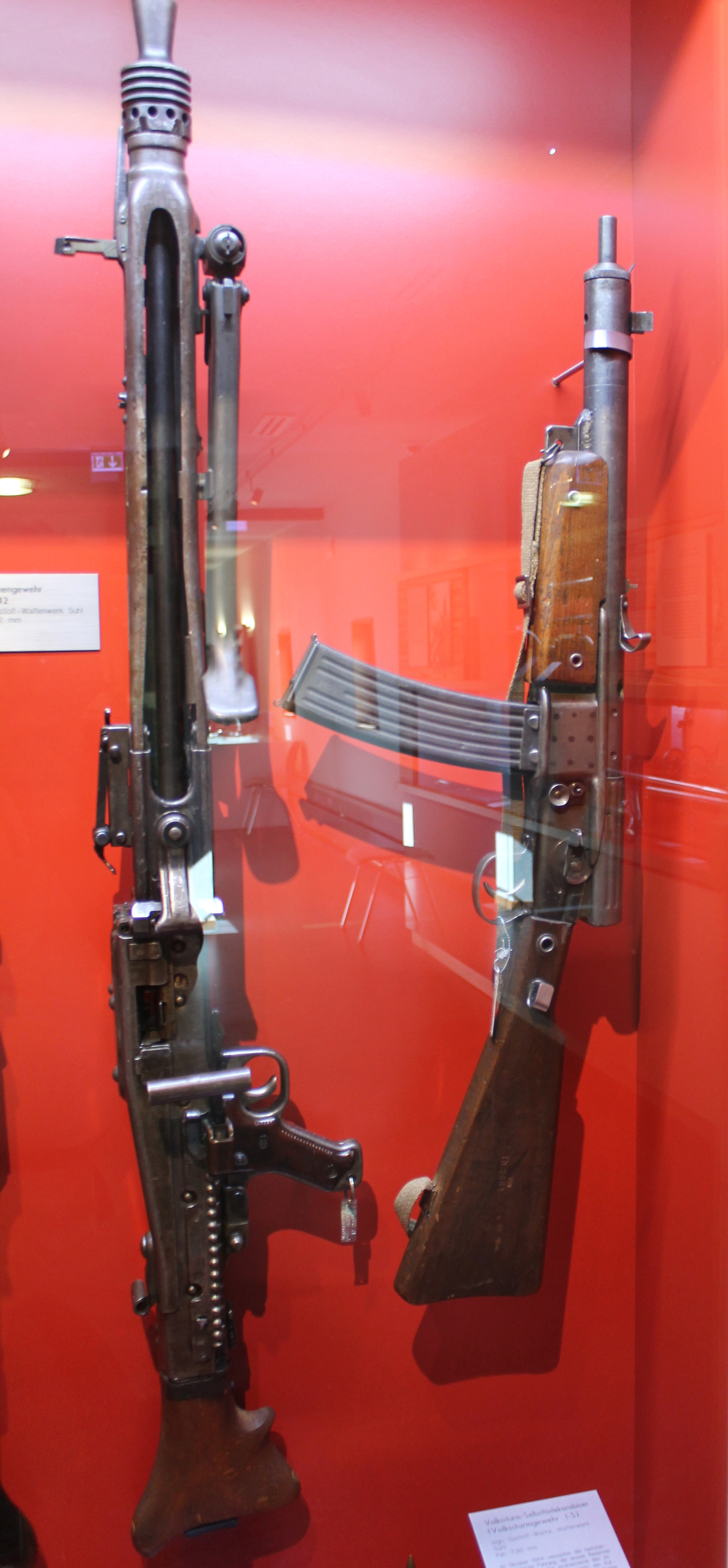
The Gustloff Volkssturmgewehr (right), shown here next to an MG 42 (left)

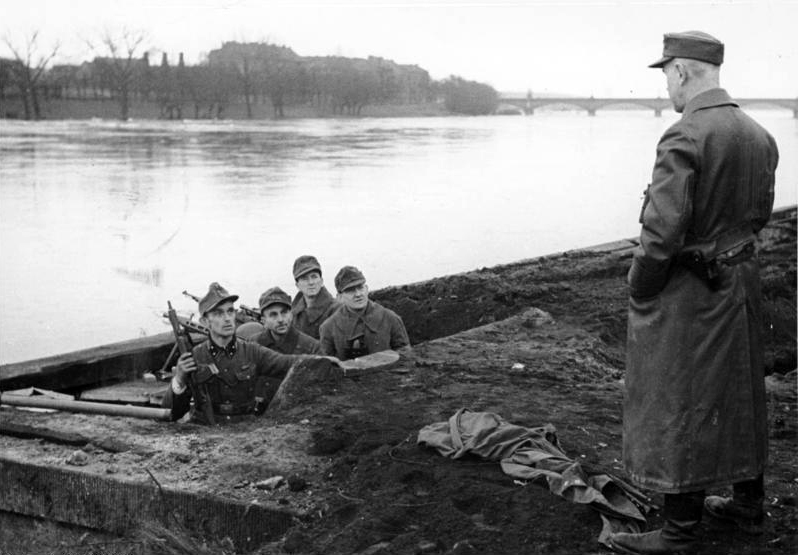
Volkssturm soldiers in an emplacement along the Oder river in 1945. The soldier on the left is carrying a Gustloff Volkssturmgewehr.

The Gustloff Volkssturmgewehr was designed by Karl Barnitzke of the Gustloff-Werke for the Primitiv-Waffen-Programm ("primitive weapons program") in 1944 and was intended to be used by the Volkssturm. Production of the Gustloff Volkssturmgewehr occurred from January 1945 till the end of the war; roughly 10,000 were made.

This gun was initially called MP 507. The MP 508 was fairly similar except it had a semi-pistol grip stock.

The weapon employed the same 7.92×33mm Kurz intermediate cartridge as the earlier StG 44 assault rifle and also used the same detachable 30-round box magazine.

The Gustloff Volkssturmgewehr uses a gas-delayed blowback action based on the Barnitzke system, whereby gas bled from the barrel near the chamber creates resistance to the rearward impulse of the operating parts, which ceases when the projectile leaves the muzzle, allowing the operating parts to be forced rearward by the residual pressure of the cartridge case. This principle has been used most successfully in the Heckler & Koch P7 pistol.

The Gustloff Volkssturmgewehr is constructed rather like many semi-automatic pistols, it has a casing and spring around the barrel; the whole casing recoils backward. The breech block, with firing pin and extractor, is pinned to the back end of the barrel casing. The rear end of the gun does not recoil and has the hammer, sear and trigger built into it. Gas coming from four vents, near the end of the barrel, holds the bolt closed till the gas pressure drops to a safe level.

The Grossfuss Sturmgewehr used the same principle of gas-delayed blowback operation, but it was somewhat more efficient in the use of gas; its bolt weighed 0.8-0.9 kg compared to 1.4 kg in the Gustloff Volkssturmgewehr.

The Gustloff Volkssturmgewehr was assembled out of 39 metallic parts, not counting rivets and screws. Of these specific parts, 12 required milling, 21 could be produced by stamping alone, and 6 were springs.

Testing of a captured Gustloff Volkssturmgewehr at a Soviet GAU shooting range showed that it was rather inaccurate, with 50% of the shots at 100 m landing in a circle with 10.2 cm (~4") radius and with 100% of the shots at the same distance landing in a circle with a 19.8 cm (7.8") radius. At 300 m these the corresponding radii were respectively 25 (9.8") and 50.3 cm (19.8").

The 100 meter fixed sights of the Gustloff Volkssturmgewehr made aiming difficult at longer ranges, with the bullet dropping around 84 cm (33 inches) below line of sight at 300 meters, forcing the shooter to aim higher on the target. For reference, a kneeling soldier presents a target approximately 96 cm (38 inches) in height, or 48 cm (19 inches) when prone.

== See also ==
- HIW VSK, similarly intended weapon using blow forward operation
- Wimmersperg Spz-kr prototype assault rifle
- Gas-delayed blowback firearms
- Volkspistole
- List of 7.92×33mm Kurz firearms
