= 7M =

7M or 7-M can refer to:

- 7M-GE, a model of Toyota M engine
- BT-7M, a model of BT-7 Soviet tank
- Headquarters Detachment 7M, now named United States Marine Corps VMGR-252
- VO-7M, now named United States Marine Corps VMA-131
- AIM-7M Sparrow, alternate name for the AIM-7 Sparrow
- 7M platform, alternate name for Volkswagen Group B-VX62 platform
- 7M, the production code for the 1989 Doctor Who serial The Curse of Fenric
- 7M, shorthand for the Seven Mountain Mandate
- 7M Films, a talent management company

== See also ==
- M7 (disambiguation)
