= Spreewerk =

German weapons manufacturing company

Metallwarenfabrik Spreewerk GmbH was a German weapons manufacturing company. Spreewerk produced a number of important weapons and components before and during World War II including 280,880 of the Walther P.38 pistol which was the standard service pistol of the German Heer, and the famous 8.8 cm Flak anti-aircraft gun.

== History ==
The Berlin-Karlsruher Industrie Werke (BERKA) was founded in 1920 as a successor to the Deutsche Waffen und Munitionsfabriken AG, one of Germany's largest munitions firms of the prewar era. Under the regime of the Versailles treaty the firm was forced to give up the manufacture of armaments, which had been its core business. Most of the facilities that had grown up to meet the needs of war were reduced and BERKA carried on with factories in Berlin and Karlsruhe, manufacturing a variety of light metal goods.

In 1928 the firm passed under the control of Günther Quandt who moved the company into the production of business machines, acquiring typewriter manufacturer Olympia Schreibmaschinen in 1929, and opening a new factory in 1933 at Erfurt to manufacture cash registers and other business machines. Under Herr Quandt's leadership further acquisitions followed.

In 1938 the firm re-entered the field of munitions production, establishing Metallwarenfabrik Spreewerk to undertake the fabrication of munitions components at the former Berlin-Spandau factory of the defunct Deutsche Waffen und Munitionsfabriken. This was followed in 1939 by the establishment of a modern ammunition loading facility on a forty hectare site near the city of Lübeck by the newly established Maschinen für Massenverpackung GmbH. Early in 1940 the firm strengthened its role in the manufacture of industrial machinery through the acquisition of the Berlin-Anhaltische Maschinenbau of Dessau.

The factories of the firm include:

Berlin-Karlsruher Industrie Werke AG, Berlin-Borsigwalde (metal fabrication)
Berlin-Karlsruher Industrie Werke AG, Karlsruhe-Durlach (metal fabrication)

Subsidiaries of the firm include:

Berlin-Anhaltische Maschinenbau AG, Dessau (machine building)
Maschinen für Massenverpackung GmbH, Lübeck-Schlutup (munitions)
Metallwarenfabrik Spreewerk AG, Berlin-Spandau (munitions)
Olympia Büromaschinenwerke AG, Erfurt (business and tabulating machines)
Olympia Schreibmaschinen AG, Berlin-Spandau (typewriters and business machines)
Sächsische Maschinenfabrik AG, Chemnitz (machine building)

Spreewerk was formed in September 1935 in Spandau Germany as a subsidiary of Deutschen Industrie-Werke A.G. (DIWAG). Spreewerk was involved in weapons production from its formation until April 1945 at the Spandau complex; and from June 1942 to April 1945 at the Grottau, Czechoslovakia factory named Werk Grottau.

== Products ==
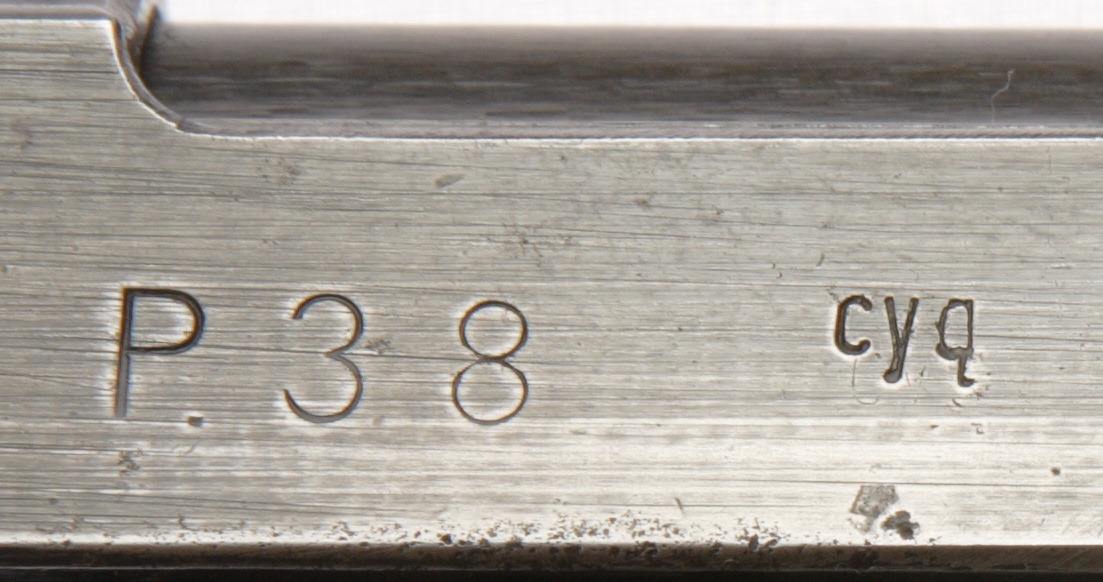
"P.38" model identification mark and Spreewerk "cyq" manufacturer's code on slide of P.38 pistol.

WWII era weapons produced by Spreewerk include:

- Spandau, Germany
  - s 10 cm K 18
  - 15 cm sFH 18
  - 8.8 cm Flak
- Grottau, Czechoslovakia
  - P.38 Pistol
  - VG 2 Rifle

== Markings ==
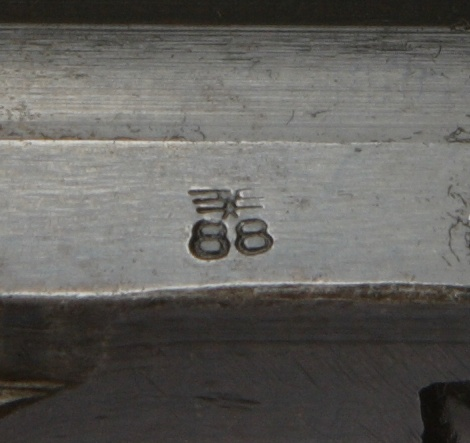
"Eagle over 88" Waffenamt inspection mark on frame of Spreewerk produced P.38 pistol.

The Waffenamt inspector at Spreewerk Grottau was assigned code WaA88. The Waffenamt stamp applied to Spreewerk produced P.38 pistols was an Eagle over 88 (e/88). Spreewerk produced P.38 pistols were marked with the "cyq" and "cvq" manufacturer's code.
