= Presstoff =

German artificial leather

Presstoff Holster
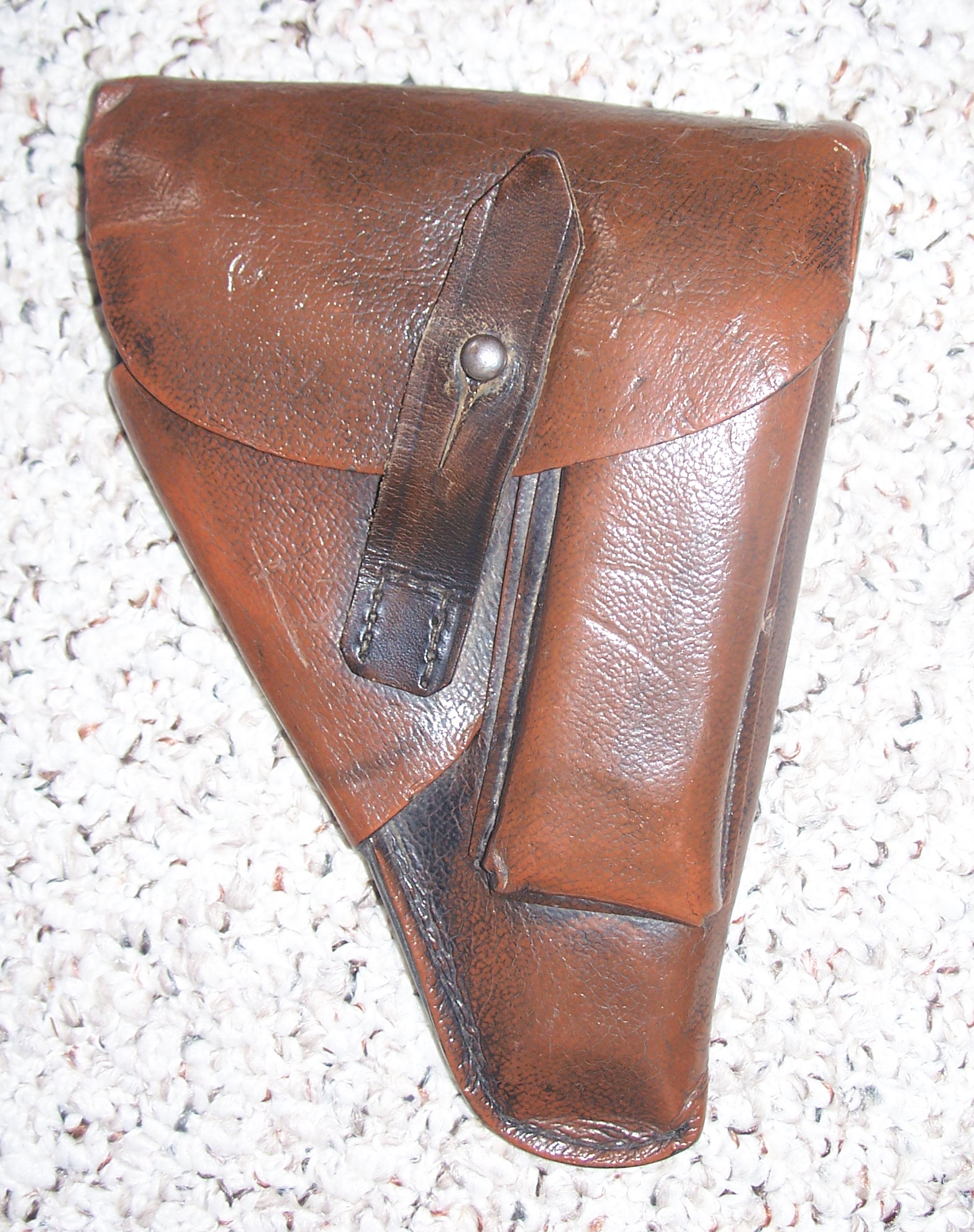
- Presstoff Dreyse m1907 Pistol Holster
- Type: Artificial leather
- Place of origin: German Empire

Service history
- In service: Germany 1904–1945
- Used by: Germany, Switzerland, Norway, Finland, Soviet Union
- Wars: World War I, World War II

Production history
- Produced: 1900–1945

Presstoff (also Preßstoff or Pressstoff) is a type of ersatz or artificial leather used during the first half of the 20th century in Germany. It is one of the oldest types of artificial leather.

It was made from specially layered paper pulp, which was then treated with a specific resin that would bind it together in layers.

== History ==
Presstoff was invented in 19th-century Germany. It was widely used during World War II because natural leather had to be strictly rationed.

In the 21st century, German consumers began favouring various leather replacements such as Presstoff that were more eco-friendly, as it breaks down easily when it becomes wet.

During the war in Poland, Presstoff was commonly known as 'preszpan'.

Presstoff was still being produced in the first quarter of the 21st century.

== Military uses during WWII ==
Presstoff was used in binoculars cases and straps, horse tack, bayonet frogs, equipment belts, cap visors etc. Presstoff was used in almost every application normally filled by leather, except items such as footwear where repeated flex wear and moisture cause Presstoff to delaminate. The task of cleaning Presstoff was almost impossible as once it gets wet, it breaks down.

== Gallery ==
Presstoff late-war holster issued to Volksgrenadier, delaminating from flex wear

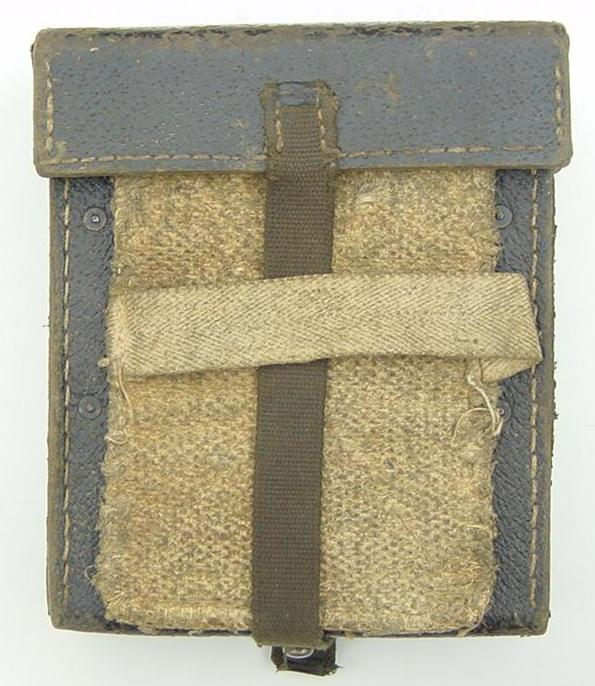
Presstoff MG42 Gunner's Kit with asbestos barrel mitt, and web strapping

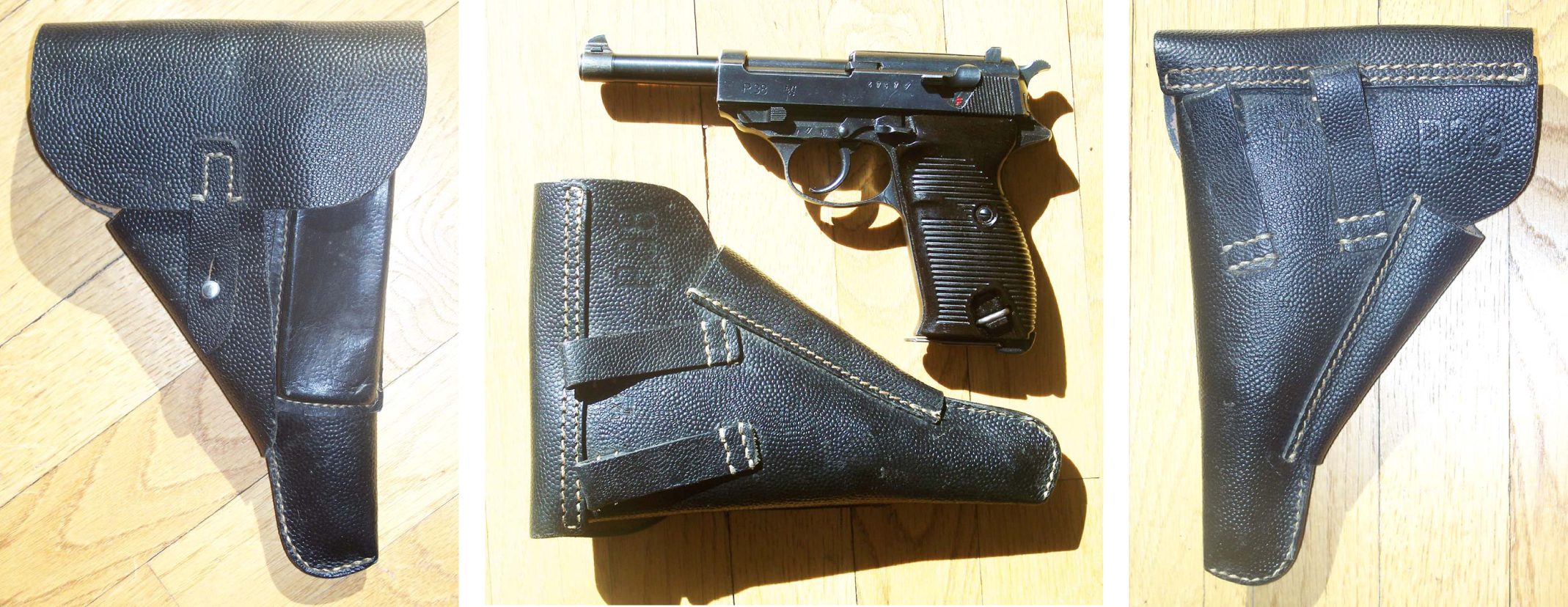
Mauser-made Walther P38 coded "byf 43" with mixed material leather and Presstoff holster made by Lederwarenfabrik Moll, coded cxb 4 (for 1944)
