= Walther P38 =

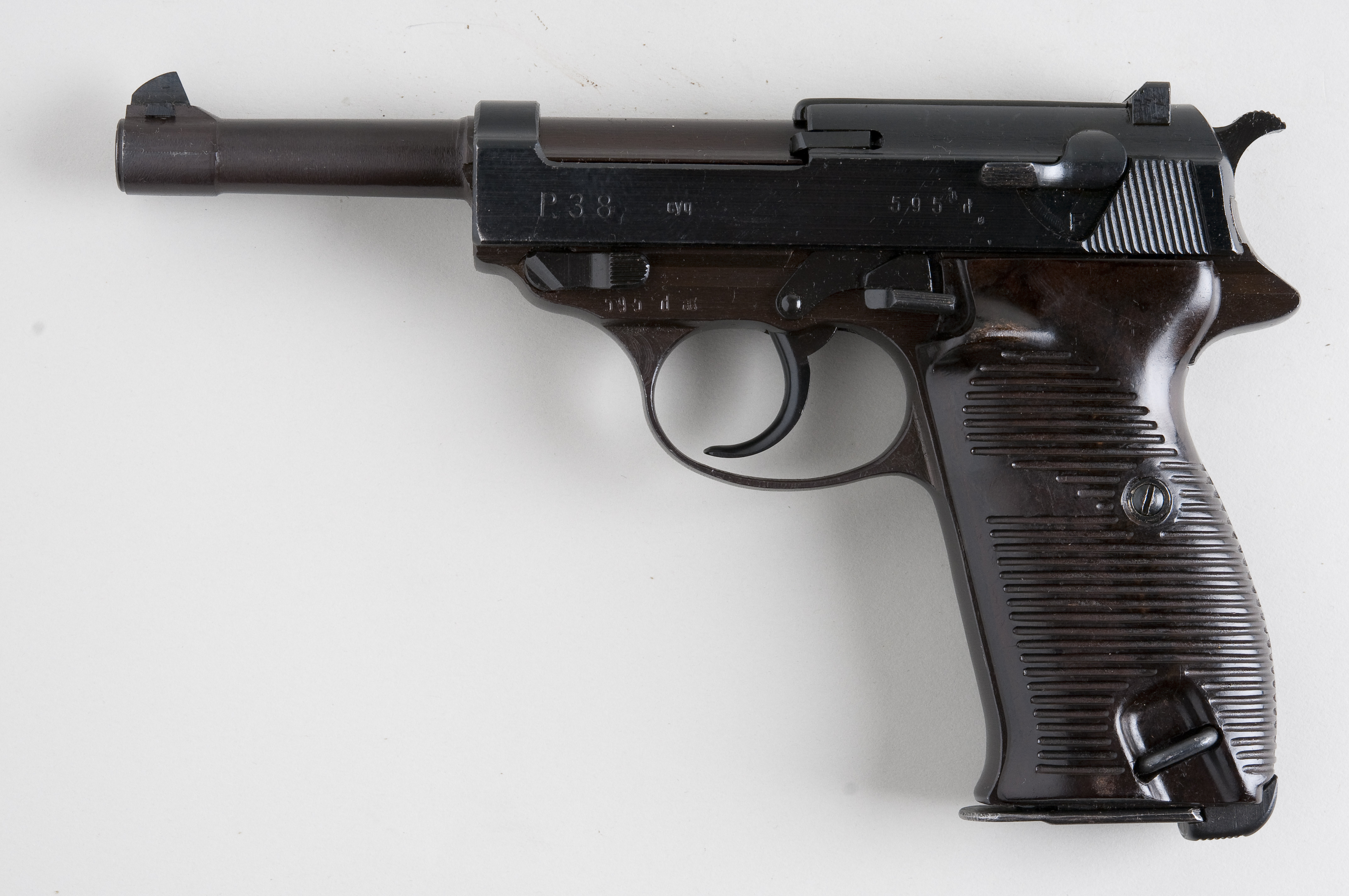
- Spreewerk manufactured Walther P38
- Type: Semi-automatic pistol
- Place of origin: Nazi Germany

Service history
- In service: 1939–1945 (Nazi Germany); West Germany; Germany 1949–present (other countries)
- Used by: See Users
- Wars: World War II; First Indochina War; Algerian War; Portuguese Colonial War; Rhodesian Bush War; Vietnam War (limited); The Troubles; 1958 Lebanon crisis; Lebanese Civil War; War in Afghanistan; Iraqi Civil War (2014–2017) (P1)

Production history
- Designed: 1938
- Manufacturer: Carl Walther Waffenfabrik, Mauser Werke, Spreewerk, Manurhin
- Unit cost: 30 ℛ︁ℳ︁ (1943) equivalent to €120 in 2021
- Produced: Walther P38 1939–1945; Pistole P1 1957–2000
- No. built: c. 1,000,000
- Variants: HP, P1, P38K, P38 SD, P4

Specifications
- Mass: 960 g (34 oz) (empty)
- Length: 216 mm (8.5 in)
- Barrel length: 125 mm (4.9 in)
- Width: 36 mm (1.4 in)
- Height: 140 mm (5.5 in)
- Cartridge: 9×19mm Parabellum
- Action: Short recoil, hinged locking piece assisted breechblock
- Rate of fire: 116 rpm (semi-automatic)
- Muzzle velocity: 1,050 ft/s (320 m/s)
- Effective firing range: Sights set for 50 metres (55 yd)
- Feed system: 8-round magazine
- Sights: Rear notch and front blade post

The Walther P38 (originally written Walther P.38) is a 9 mm semi-automatic pistol that was developed by Carl Walther GmbH as the service pistol of the Wehrmacht at the beginning of World War II. It was intended to replace the comparatively complex and expensive to produce Luger P08. Moving the production lines to the more easily mass producible P38 once World War II started took longer than expected, leading to the P08 remaining in production until September 1942 and copies remained in service until the end of the war.

== Development ==
As the previous service pistol, the Luger P08, was expensive to produce, Germany started to look for a replacement as early as 1927, settling on the Walther P38 in 1938, which offered similar performance to the Luger P08 but took almost half the time to produce. The first design was submitted to the German Army and featured a locked breech and a hidden hammer but the Army requested that it should be redesigned with an external hammer.

The P38 concept was accepted by the German military in 1938 but production of prototype ("Test") pistols did not begin until late 1939. Walther began manufacture at their plant in Zella-Mehlis and produced three series of "Test" pistols, designated by a "0" prefix to the serial number. The third series pistols solved the problems for the German Army and mass production began in mid-1940, using Walther's military production identification code "480".

Several experimental versions were later created in .45 ACP, and .38 Super but these were never mass-produced. In addition to the 9×19mm Parabellum version, some 7.65×21mm Parabellum and some .22 Long Rifle versions were also manufactured and sold.

== Design details ==
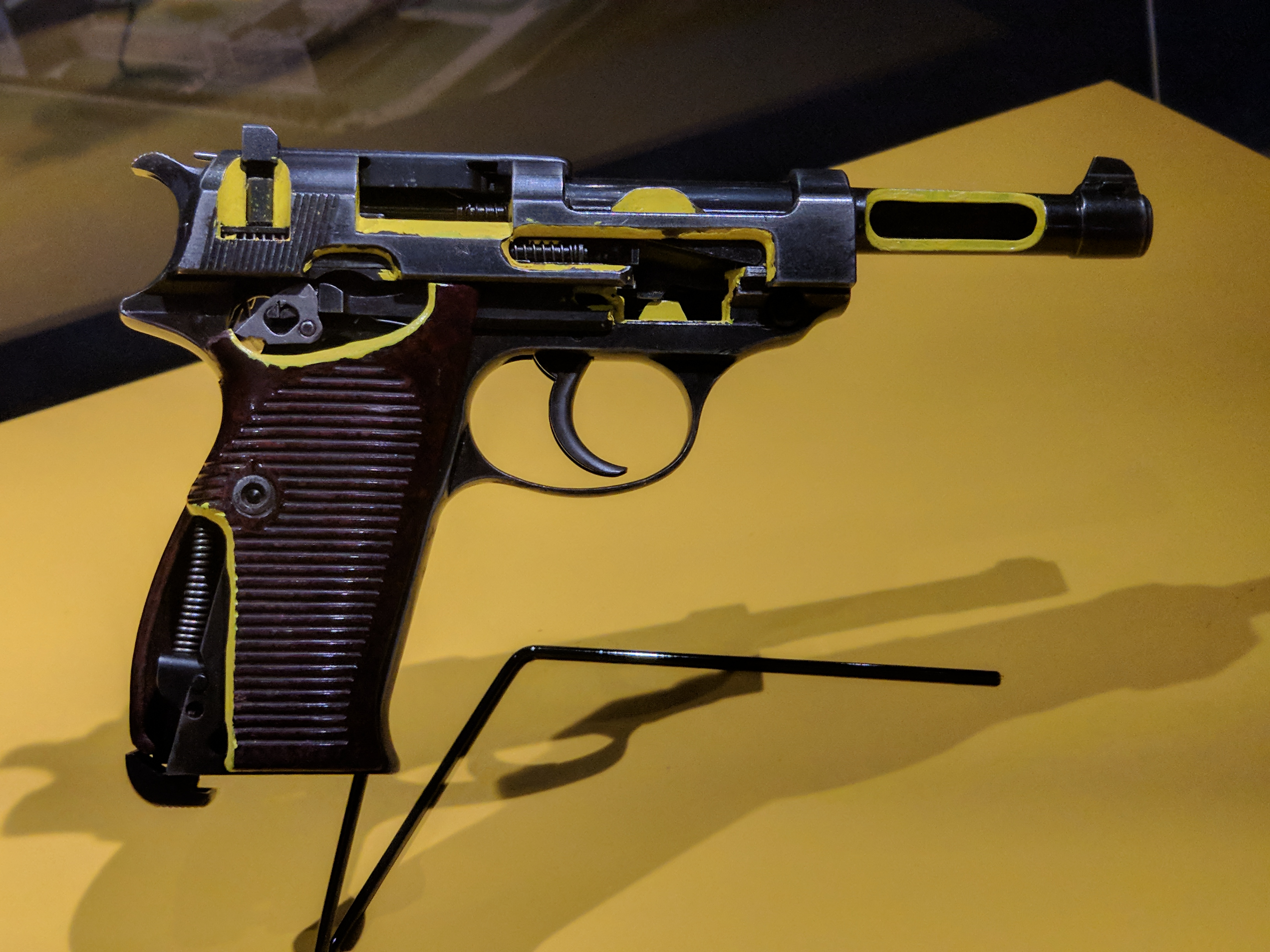
P38 cut-away model

The P38 is a semi-automatic pistol design, which introduced technical features used today in commercial and military semi-automatic pistols, including the Beretta 92FS and its M9 sub-variant.

The P38 was the first locked-breech pistol to use a double-action/single-action (DA/SA) trigger (the earlier double-action PPK was an unlocked blowback design, but the more powerful 9×19mm Parabellum round used in the P38 needed a locked breech design). The shooter could chamber a round, use the safety-decocking lever to lower the hammer without firing the round, and carry the weapon with a round chambered. The lever can stay on "safe", or if returned to "fire", the weapon remains safely "ready" with a long, double-action trigger pull for the first shot. Pulling the trigger cocks the hammer before firing the first shot with double-action operation. The firing mechanism extracts and ejects the first spent round, cocks the hammer, and chambers a fresh round for single-action operation with each subsequent shot; all features found in many modern handguns. Besides a DA/SA trigger design similar to that of the earlier Walther PPKs the P38 features a visible and tactile loaded chamber indicator in the form of a metal rod that protrudes from the rear of the slide when a round is chambered.

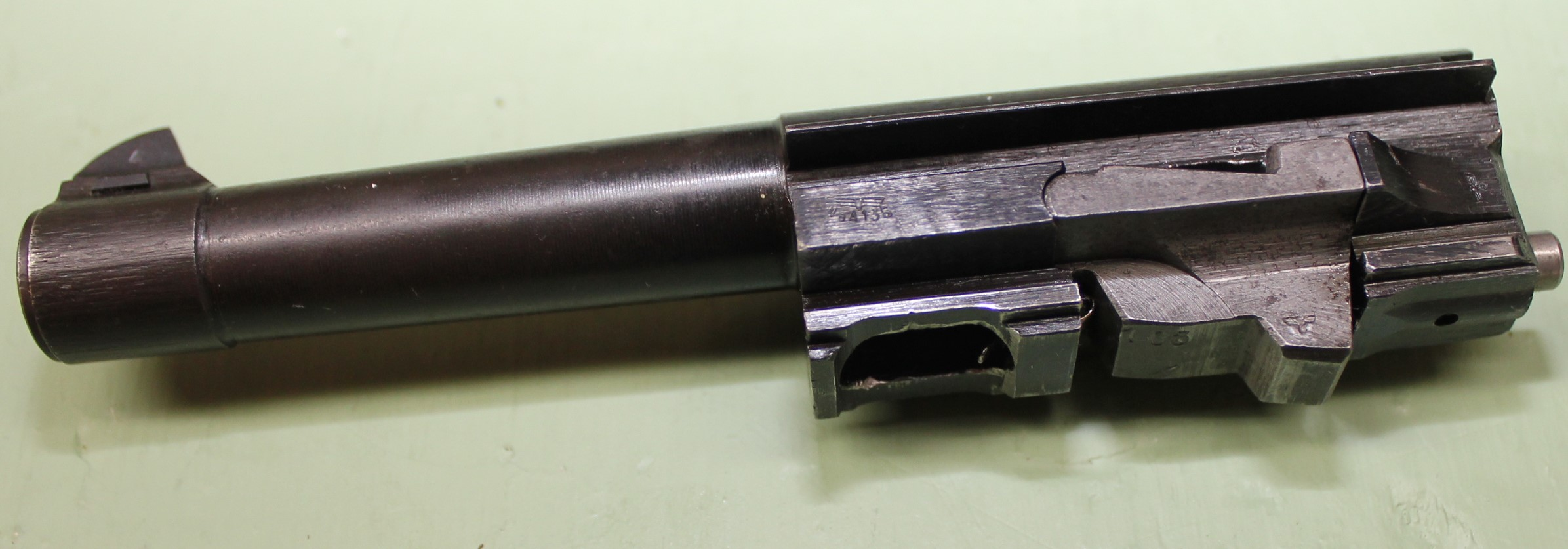
1943 Mauser P.38 barrel showing locking block design

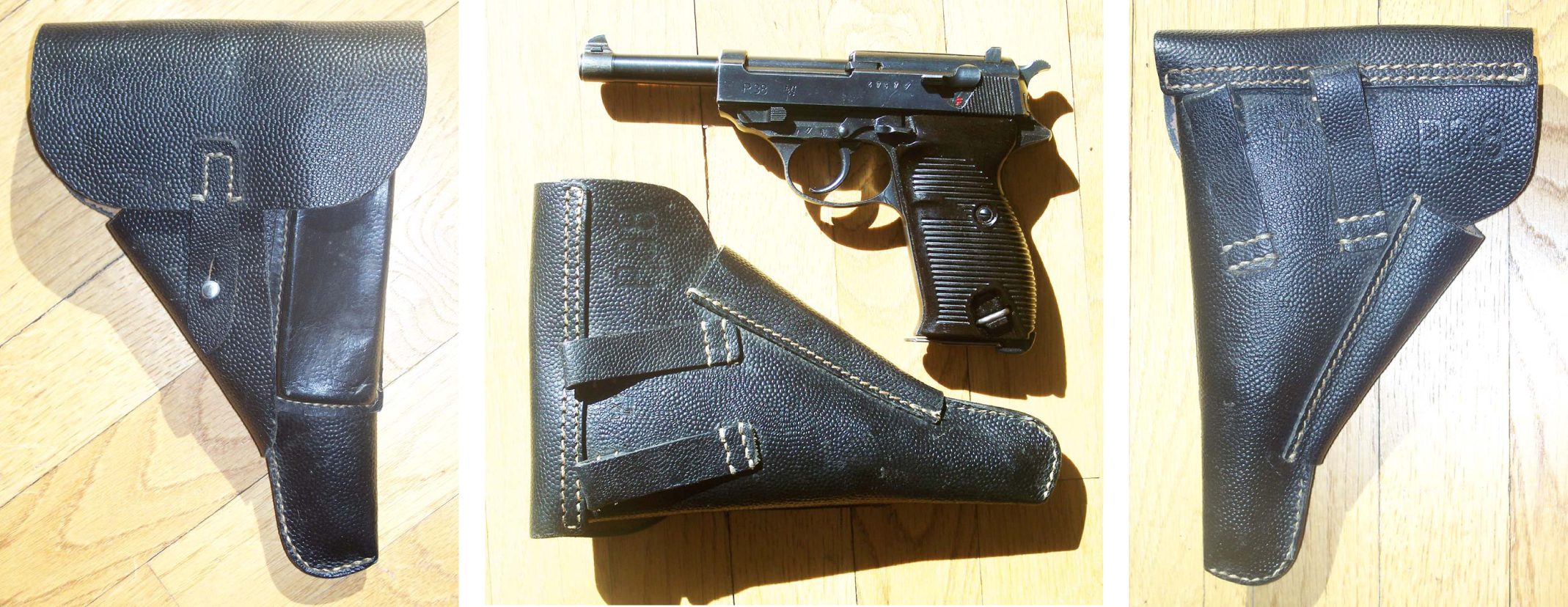
P38 made by Mauser, coded "byf 44" with matching presstoff and leather holster

The moving-barrel mechanism is actuated by a wedge-shaped hinged locking piece underneath the breech. When the pistol is fired, the barrel and slide recoil together, until the hinged locking piece drives down, disengaging the slide and arresting further rearward movement of the barrel. The slide continues its rearward movement on the frame, ejecting the spent case and cocking the hammer before reaching the end of travel. Unlike most autopistols which eject empty cases to the right, the Walther P38 ejects empty cases to the left. Two recoil springs on either side of the frame and below the slide, having been compressed by the slide's rearward movement, drive the slide forward, stripping a new round from the magazine, driving it into the breech and re-engaging the barrel; ending its return travel with a fresh round chambered, hammer cocked and ready to repeat the process. The hinged locking piece assisted breechblock design provides good accuracy due to the in-line travel of the barrel and slide.

Initial production P38 pistols were fitted with walnut grips, but these were later supplanted by Bakelite grips. Sheet metal grips were used for a time on pistols produced in France after the war, being called "Gray Ghosts" by collectors on the account of their distinctive parkerizing and sheet metal grips. Post war P1 grips were made of black colored plastic.

== Variants ==
The Walther P38 was in production from 1939 to 1945. Initial development of the pistol took place 1937–1939, culminating in the first Model HP or Heerespistole ("army pistol"), which had several variants as engineering changes were made. Early production included a Swedish contract. The designation P38 indicates Wehrmacht adoption in 1938, although the exact date is unknown. The transition from HP to the mechanically-identical P38-marked pistols took place 1939–1940. Sweden bought the Walther HP in 1939.

During World War II, the P38 was produced by Walther, Mauser, and Spreewerk. To conceal manufacturer identities, each wartime manufacturer used a letter code: ac (Walther); byf (Mauser), and cyq (Spreewerk), followed by the date (e.g.: ac44: Walther 1944 production). Spreewerk did not mark production dates. Pistols were produced in blocks of 10,000 consecutively numbered pistols, with each block having a consecutive letter suffix, to conceal production volume. 1,277,680 P38s were produced during World War II: 617,585 by Walther in Zella-Mehlis; 372,875 by Mauser in Oberndorf; 287,220 by Spreewerk Grottau. Late in the war, the Spreewerk (cyq) die broke. Subsequent pistols appear to be marked "cvq" due to the broken die. About 31,400 pistols are so marked. Spreewerk production ended April 1945.

From 1945 to 1946, several thousands of pistols were assembled for the French armed forces(frequently dubbed "grey ghosts" because of parkerized finish and grey sheet metal grips). Only after 1957 was the P38 again produced for the German military. West Germany desired to rebuild its military so that it could shoulder some of the burden for its own defense. Walther retooled for new P38 production since no military firearms production had occurred in West Germany since the end of the war, knowing that the military would again seek Walther firearms. When the Bundeswehr announced it wanted the P38 for its official service pistol, Walther readily resumed P38 production within just two years, using wartime pistols as models and new engineering drawings and machine tools. The first of the new P38s were delivered to the West German military in June 1957, some 17 years and two months after the pistol had initially seen action in World War II, and from 1957 to 1963 the P38 was again the standard sidearm.

=== P1 ===
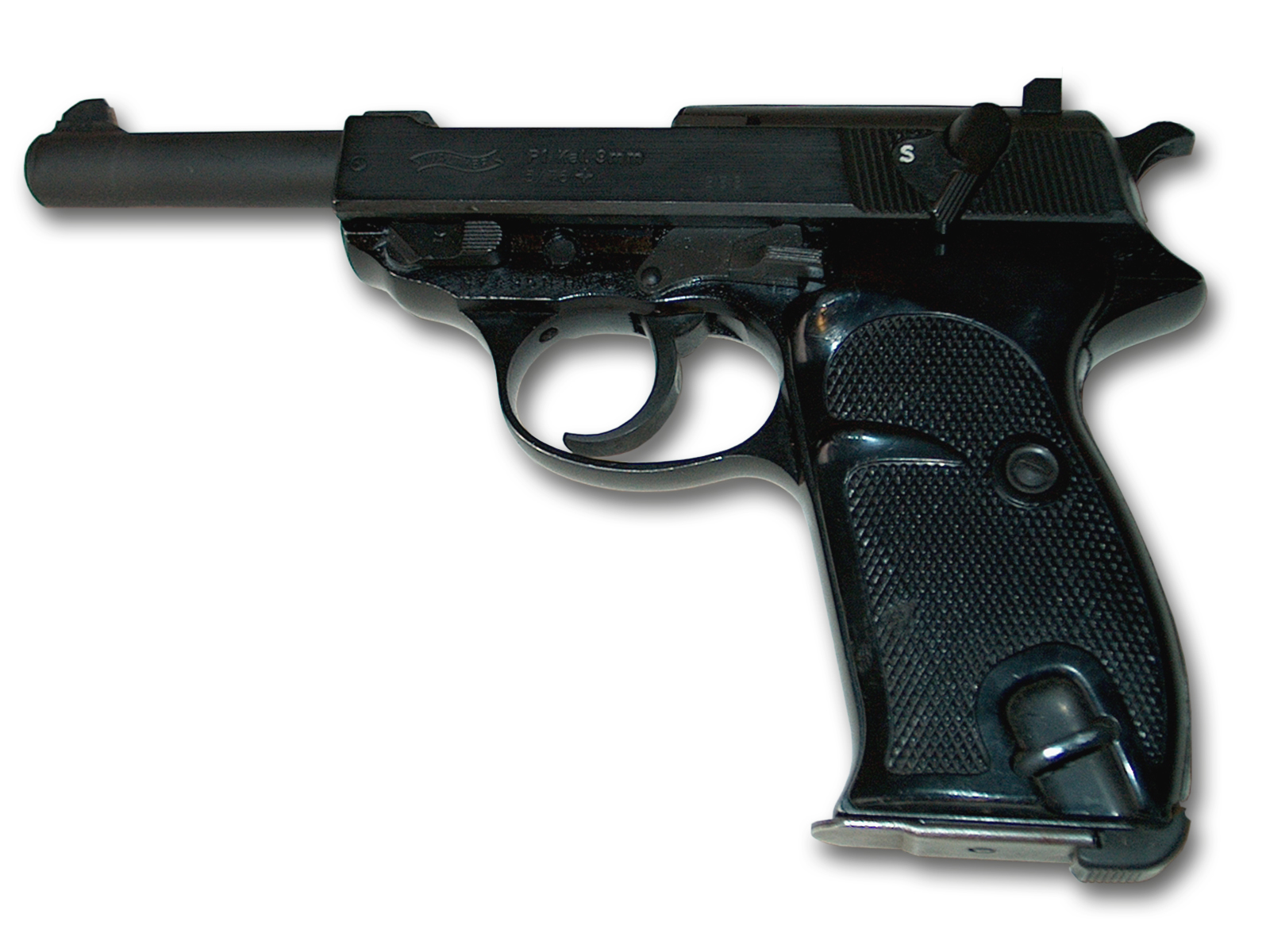
The P1 used by the Bundeswehr

In late 1963 the postwar military model P1 was adopted for use by the West German military, identifiable by the P1 stamping on the slide. Most postwar pistols, whether marked as P38 or P1, have an aluminium frame rather than the steel frame of the original design, though a limited number of post war models were made using a steel frame. Starting in June 1975, the aluminum frame was reinforced with a hex bolt above the trigger guard, and a slightly modified, stronger slide design was introduced. During the 1990s the German military started replacing the P1 with the P8 pistol and finally phased out the P1 in 2004.

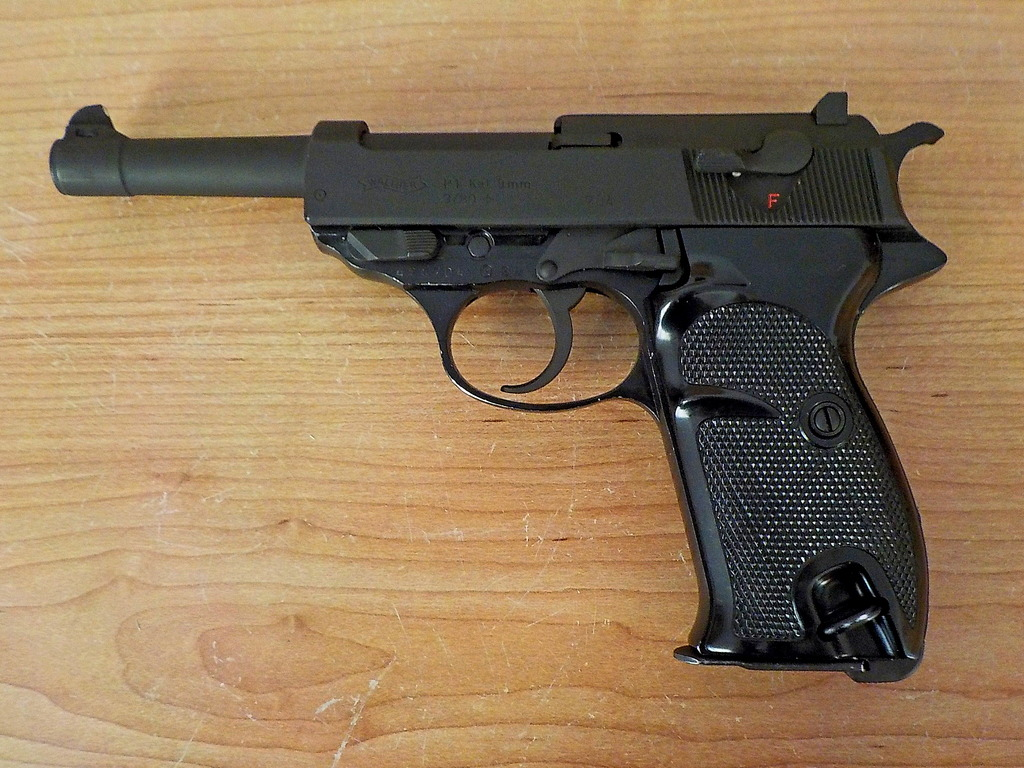
Walther P1 (1980) frame was reinforced with a hex bolt, and stronger "fat" slide.

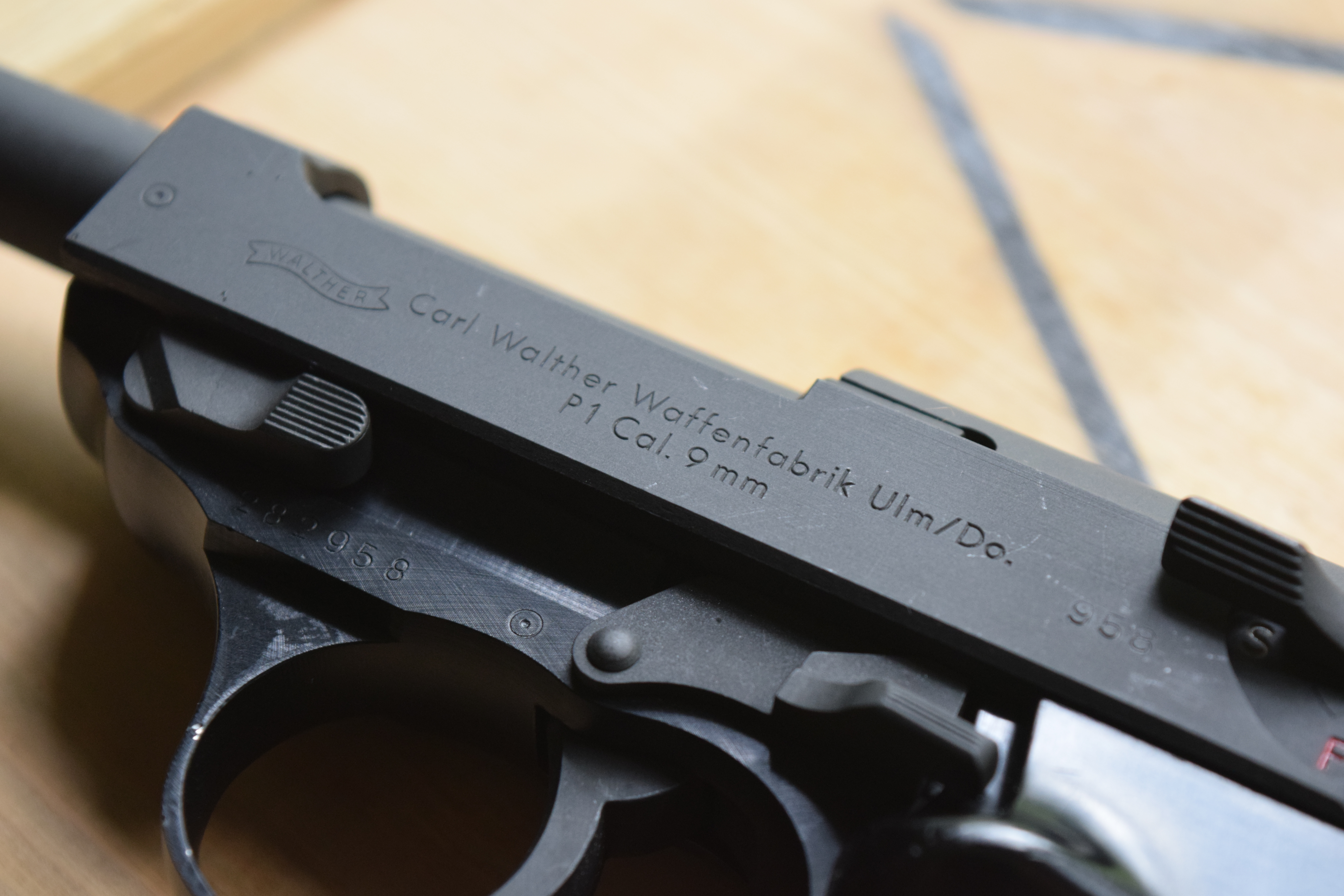
Walther P1 rollmarks

=== P4 ===
An improved version of the P38, the Walther P4, was developed in the late 1970s and was adopted by the police forces of South Africa, Rhineland-Palatinate and Baden-Württemberg.

=== P5 ===
Improved version with a closed slide.

=== Clones ===
Turkish clones made by Kirrikale.

== Users ==
- Algeria
- Chad: P1 variant.
- Chile: Chilean Army.
- Iraq: Kurdistan Region received 8,000 P1 pistols in 2014
- North Macedonia: P1 variant.
- Mozambique
- South Africa: Standard sidearm of SA Police.
- Thailand: Used by Royal Thai Police as Type 96 Pistol (ปืนพกแบบ 96, ปพ.96).
- Uruguay

=== Former ===
- Afghanistan: Afghan National Police received 10,000 P1s after the fall of the Taliban
- Austria
- Bulgaria: Supplied by Germany during World War II
- Independent State of Croatia
- East Germany: Used primarily by police and paramilitary.
- Finland: Finnish UN peacekeeping forces, P1 variant.
- France: Replaced by the mid-1950s.
- Germany: P1 variant.
- Hungary
- Italy
- Kazakhstan – used as a service pistol in private security companies at least up to 2007.
- Lebanon: Used in small numbers by the Lebanese Army and later by some Lebanese militias during the 1958 Lebanon crisis and the Lebanese Civil War (1975–1990).
- Nazi Germany
- North Vietnam
- Norway: Norwegian Armed Forces. Replaced by the P80 in 1985
- Portugal: Used by Portuguese Army until 2019, when was replaced by the Glock 17 Gen 5.
- Rhodesia: Standard sidearm of the BSAP.
- Sweden: HP variant. The Swedish military designation was "pistol m/39". Sweden also used P38s that were confiscated from the German military during World War II.
- United States: Used by US Army Special Forces assigned to Detachment 'A', Berlin during the Cold War.
- West Germany
  - West Berlin Police Manurhin manufactured P38s from France due to treaty restrictions.
  - Bundesgrenzschutz
  - Bereitschaftspolizei
- Yugoslav Partisans
