= Dreyse M1907 =

Dreyse Model 1907 (Dreyse M1907)
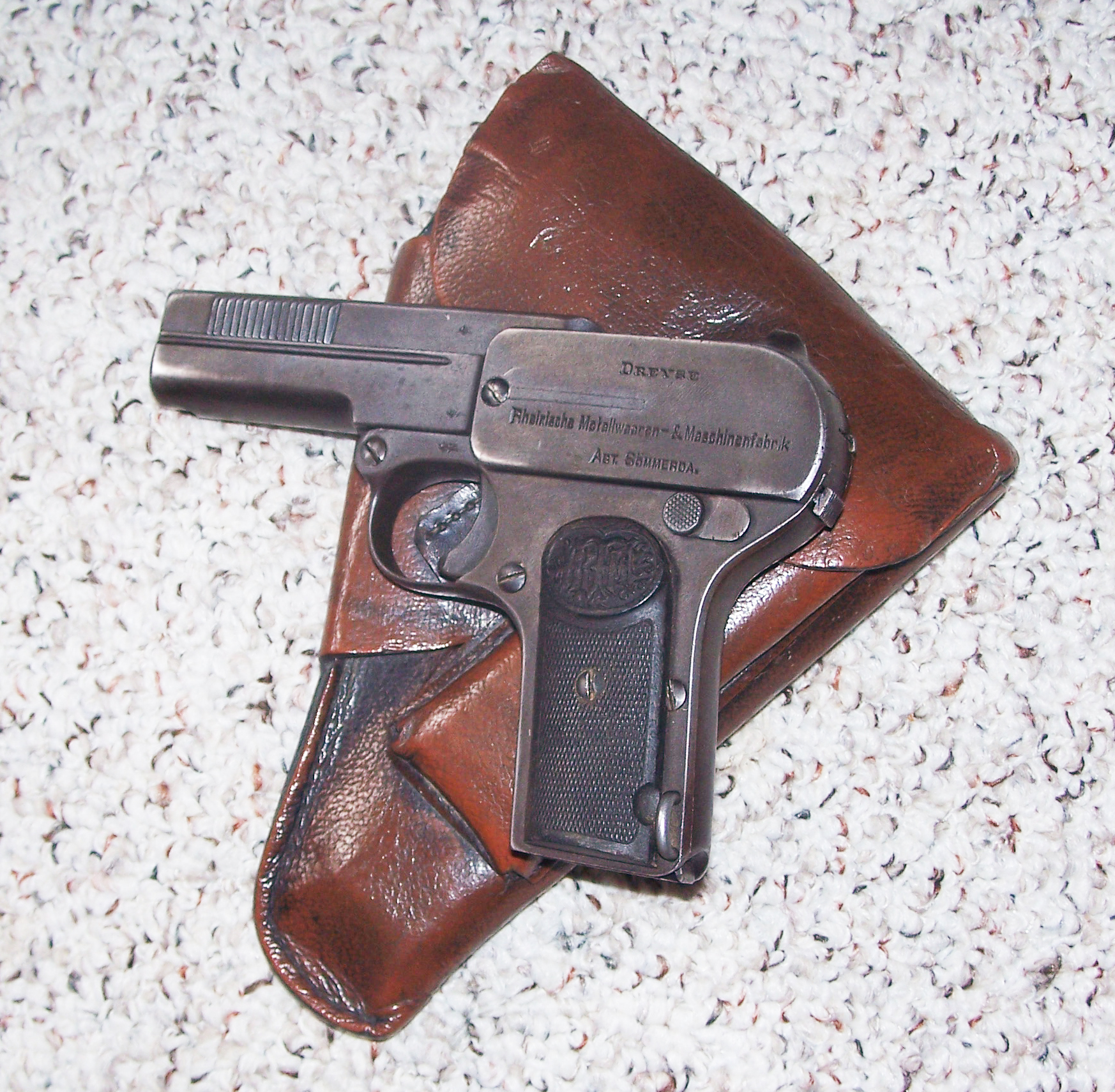
- Dreyse M1907. This example has World War I Imperial German ordnance acceptance stamps, and a late World War II issued Presstoff holster
- Type: Semi-automatic pistol
- Place of origin: German Empire

Service history
- In service: 1907–1945
- Used by: See Users
- Wars: World War I, Lithuanian Wars of Independence, World War II

Production history
- Designer: Louis Schmeisser
- Designed: 1905–1906
- Manufacturer: Rheinische Metallwaaren- und Maschinenfabrik AG
- Produced: 1907–1915

Specifications
- Mass: 710 g (1 lb 9 oz)
- Length: 160 mm (6.3 in)
- Barrel length: 92 mm (3.6 in)
- Cartridge: 7.65 mm Browning (.32 ACP)
- Caliber: 7.65 mm
- Action: blowback, unlocked breech
- Muzzle velocity: 305 m/s (1,000 ft/s)
- Effective firing range: Sights set for 25 m (82 ft)
- Maximum firing range: 50 m (164 ft) effective range
- Feed system: 7-round detachable single-stack magazine
- Sights: Rear notch and front blade post

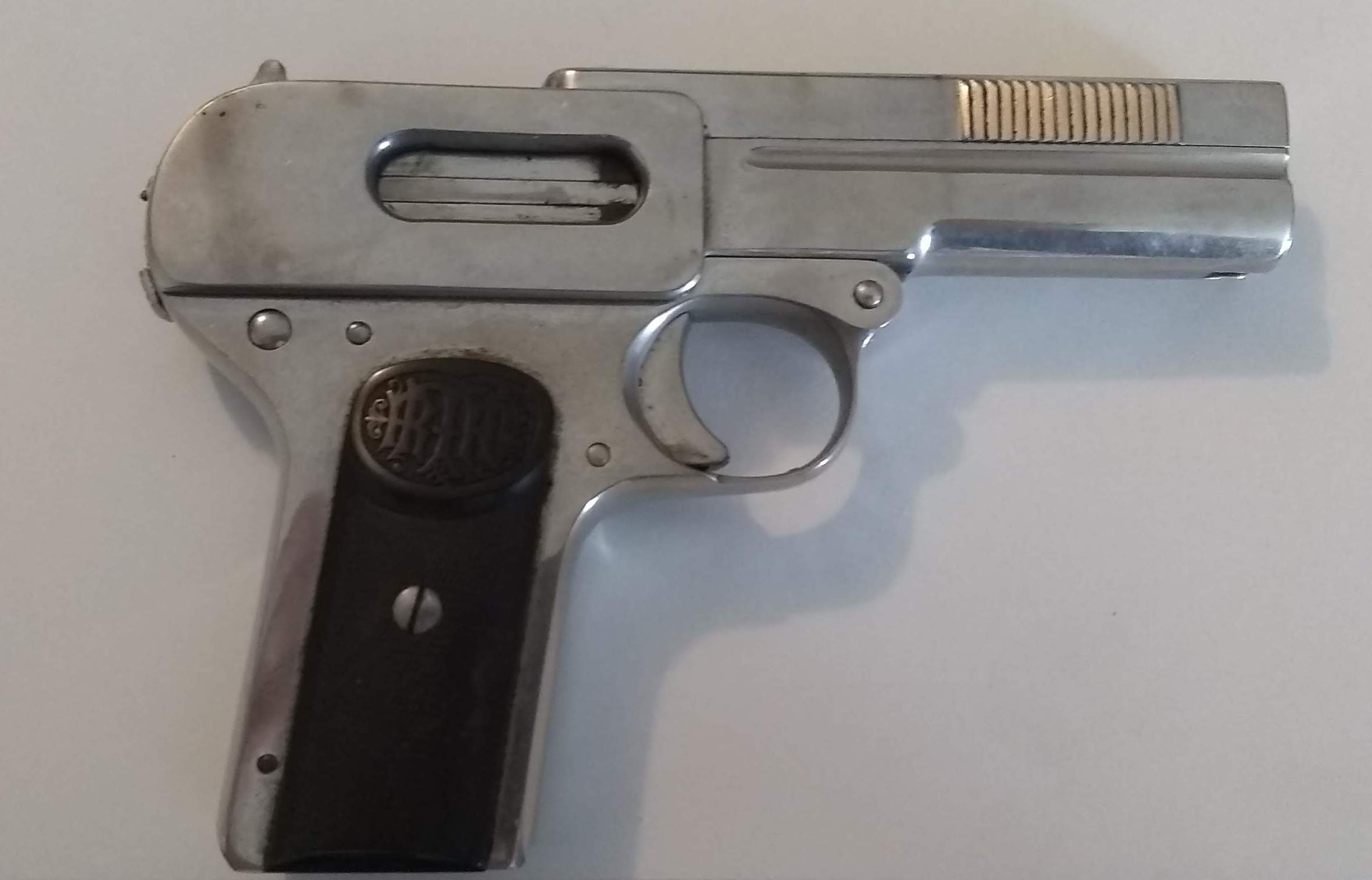
A nickel plated Dreyse M1907

The Dreyse Model 1907 is a semi-automatic pistol designed by Louis Schmeisser. The gun was named after Nikolaus von Dreyse, the designer and inventor of the Dreyse Needle Gun. The Waffenfabrik von Dreyse company was acquired by Rheinische Metallwaren & Maschinenfabrik Sömmerda in 1901, although the Dreyse Model pistols were marketed under the Dreyse name.

The pistol had an interesting feature for the time: when the gun was ready to fire, the firing pin projected through the back of the breech block, serving as an early handgun-cocking indicator. For cleaning, the frame, receiver and slide pivoted forward on a pin in front of the trigger guard. The pistol and its derivatives (Dreyse Model 1907 Pocket Pistol, Dreyse Model 1912 Parabellum) was of simple blowback recoil operation, though of unusual design.

The same company also manufactured a 6.35 mm pocket version (also named Model 1907). In 1912 the 9 mm Parabellum Dreyse Model 1912 emerged as the gun's successor. Marked as the RM & M Dreyse, it was chambered for 9 mm Parabellum.

Despite the gun's limited production time, the gun is relatively common today, in large part due to its use by Volkssturm and Volksgrenadier late in World War II, enabling many Allied personnel to bring examples home as war trophies.

== Dreyse company ==
The Waffenfabrik von Dreyse was founded around 1841 to manufacture the famous Dreyse Needle gun for the Prussian Army, and they also made needle-pistols and caplock revolvers. The Dreyse Factory went into decline after the German Army adopted the Mauser in 1872. In 1901 Rheinische Metallwaren- & Maschinenfabrik of Sömmerda purchased Waffenfabrik von Dreyse.

== Development ==
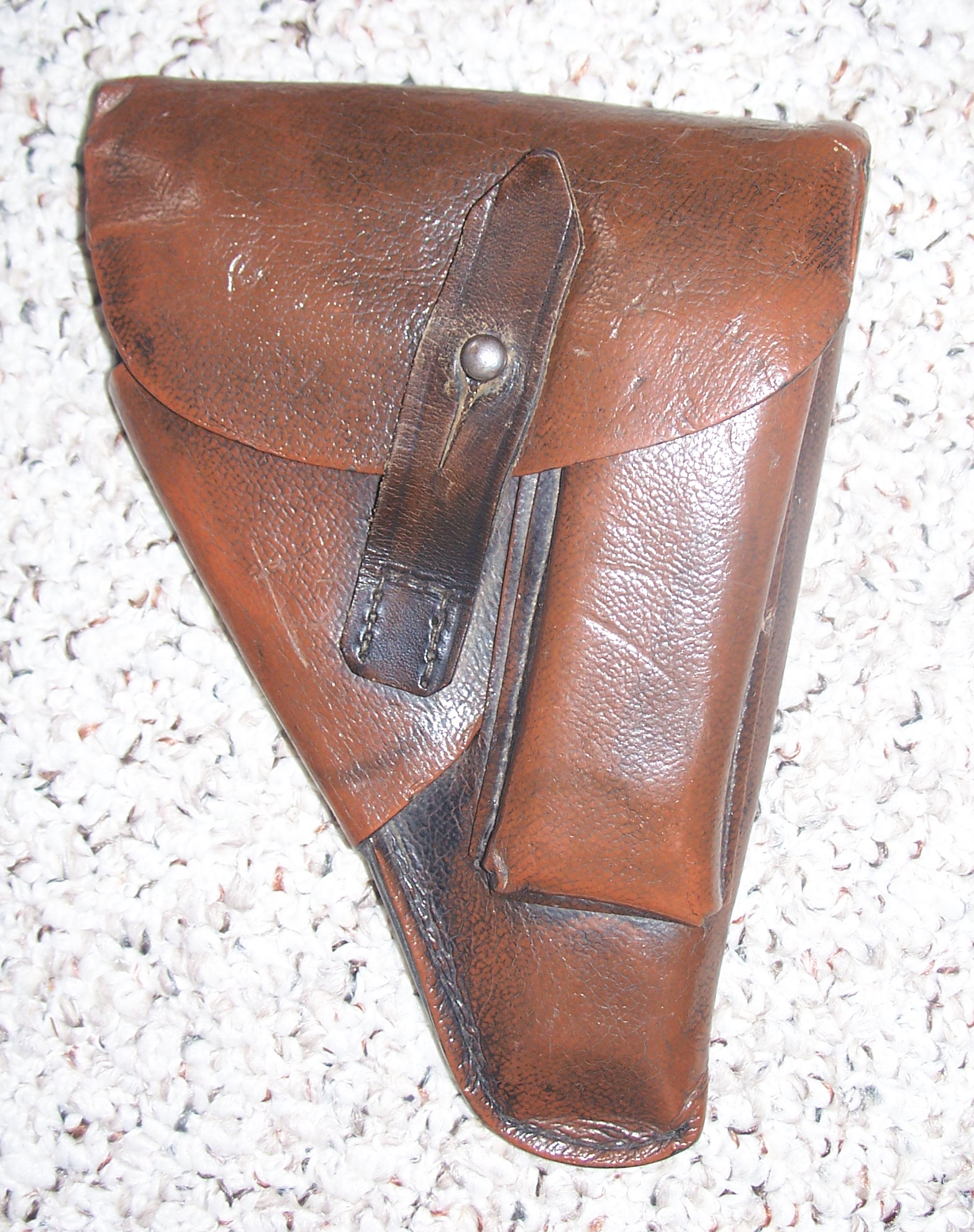
Presstoff late-war holster issued to Volksgrenadiers

The Model 1907 Dreyse pistol was designed by Louis Schmeisser (who had previously worked with Theodor Bergmann on the Bergmann machine gun) in 1905–1906 and were marketed from 1907 onward. The first gun, the 7.65 mm Auto is the most unusual. Most of the cranked slide lies along the top of the barrel, with a short section projecting down behind the chamber to serve as the breech block.

The breech block is confined within a flat-sided frame with a bridge to carry the back sight and arrest the upper section of the slide. The recoil spring surrounds the barrel, enclosed in the frame and held by a collar engaging the front end of the slide through a spring catch. Pulling back on the finger grips at the front of the slide brings the breech block into view behind the frame.

The Dreyse pistol is fired by a striker whose tail protrudes back through the rear of the breech block when the chamber is loaded. The entire top section of the frame and slide can be pivoted on a pin in front of the trigger guard, being locked in the firing position by a catch at the rear of the frame. This final refinement is essential to dismantling; removal of the cranked slide is impossible otherwise.

The Dreyse design was strongly influenced by John Browning's FN M1900, though the Browning has its recoil spring above the barrel, while the Dreyse has a concentric recoil spring. Nonetheless, the overall shape is the same, as is the grip angle and surface design, the magazine release, the positioning of the manual safety and the breech blocks.

== Design modifications ==
The only major modification concerned the firing mechanism. Prior to 1915, the cocked striker had been held by the sear before being released by the trigger; pulling the trigger subsequently pushed the striker back before releasing it, compressing the striker spring to a greater extent. Another wartime change involved a recess cut in the top front of the slide to facilitate removal of the recoil-spring retaining bush.

== Variants ==
Early pistols are marked "Dreyse Rheinische Metallwaren- & Maschinenfabrik ABT. Sommerda" on the left side of the frame and an "RMF" monogram on the grips. Later pistols are usually marked "Dreyse Rheinmetal ABT. Sommerda".

A few pistols made in 1914 lack the Dreyse marking. The pistol was also marketed commercially for police forces, including the Royal Saxon Gendarmerie, examples of which are marked as "K. Sachs. Gend."

== Military users ==
Primarily used by Austrian troops during World War I, especially officers of the Austro-Hungarian Habsburg Empire. Also used by officers of Imperial Germany during World War I.

Examples issued to the Imperial German Army will have an acceptance proof above the ejection port on the right as well as the normal Crown N commercial proofs on the left side of the frame and slide near the trigger.

Examples saw use by Wehrmacht troops (especially officers) during World War II. Nearing the end of the war many examples were issued to the Volksgrenadiere and Volkssturm, the latter often with so-called "last-ditch" Presstoff holsters. Large numbers of these were brought back to the United States by returning servicemen, which accounts for their availability in the country today. Typically the paper Presstoff holsters have not survived.

A few thousand were purchased by the Czechoslovakia military in 1921 and 1922, but they were removed from service in 1923 due to unspecified accidents with them.

In 1912 the pope's Swiss Guard acquired thirty of these pistols for use by officers and non-commissioned officers. They remained in service until 1990 when they were replaced by the SIG P225 pistol as the P75.

During World War II this pistol found its way to the Norwegian resistance. Quite a few of these pistols have, alongside home-made Sten-guns and illegal radios, been found hidden within the house-walls of Norwegian resistance members and sympathisers.

There has not been described any action in Norway with any Dreyse-pistols. As for the unspecified "accidents" with these pistols, the rear latch which holds the hinged upper part, may come loose. If this happens, the striker will move forward and ignite the cartridge. An unconfirmed civilian incident happened in the 1980s, where the shooter pierced his foot with the 7.65 mm as a result of the latch coming loose.

== Users ==
- Austria-Hungary
- Finland
- German Empire
- Nazi Germany
- Lithuania: 110 batches, obtained in 1919-1920
- Ottoman Empire
- Vatican City: 30 batches, replaced by SIG P75

== Notable examples ==
The Deutsches Panzermuseum in Munster, Germany has an M1907 as the first display in its exhibit of German Army sidearms.

== In popular culture ==
The Dreyse M1907 appeared in the earlier versions of the board game Cluedo, mislabelled as a revolver.

The "Dreyse 1906" is depicted in Fritz Lang's 1933 film The Testament of Dr. Mabuse by former detective Hofmeister, and is the favorite weapon of the assassin Hardy, to kill Dr. Kramm. After Hardy's death, Inspector Lohmann muses that Hardy must have used the "1906 Dreyse" pistol because he was used to it, even though "these guns have been out of style for a long time." The film was banned in Germany by Joseph Goebbels, and was not shown in Germany until 1951.

The M1907 appears as the police service weapon of Inspector Gereon Rath, the male protagonist of the 2017 German limited run series, Babylon Berlin, which is set in the German Weimar Republic.
