= CEAM Modèle 1950 =

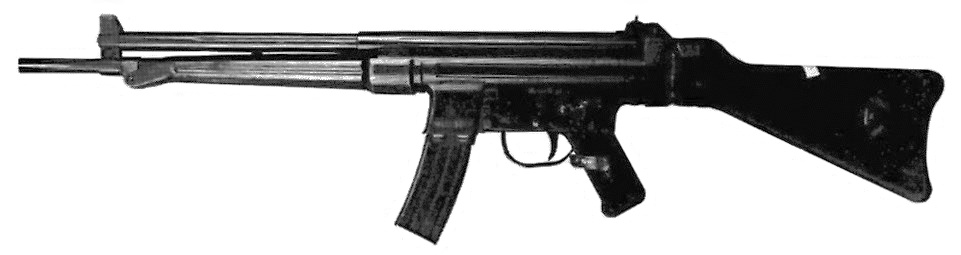
- The CEAM Modèle 1950
- Type: Assault rifle
- Place of origin: France

Production history
- Designer: Theodor Löffler and Ludwig Vorgrimler
- Designed: February, 1949
- Manufacturer: Centre d'Etudes et d'Armement de Mulhouse (CEAM)
- Produced: 1950
- Variants: Modèle 1, Modèle 1949, Modèle II

Specifications
- Mass: 4.33 kg (9.5 lb)
- Length: 905 mm (35.6 in), 658 mm (25.9 in) with stock folded
- Barrel length: 425 mm (16.7 in)
- Cartridge: .30 Carbine; 7.92×33mm Kurz, 7.65×35mm, 7.5×38mm in early prototypes
- Action: Roller-delayed blowback
- Rate of fire: 520 rpm
- Muzzle velocity: 610 m/s (2,000 ft/s)
- Effective firing range: 200m - 300m
- Feed system: 30-round detachable box magazine
- Sights: Iron sights

The CEAM Modèle 1950 was a prototype assault rifle chambered in the .30 Carbine round. It was developed by Centre d'Etudes et d'Armement de Mulhouse (CEAM) of France during the late 1940s/early 1950s, as a development of the German StG 45(M) assault rifle. The three initial prototypes, designated Modèle 1, were chambered in 7.92×33mm Kurz, 7.65×35mm (an experimental French cartridge developed by Cartoucherie de Valence), and .30 Carbine. All succeeding prototypes (Modèle 1949, Modèle II, and the definitive Modèle 1950) were chambered in .30 Carbine. All versions of the design included a combined bipod/handguard and a folding buttstock. Due to economic considerations, with France fighting the Indochina War and being the second biggest NATO contributor, the weapon was cancelled. Co-designer Ludwig Vorgrimler then left for Spain, where he further developed the concept into the CETME rifle, which in turn was developed into the Heckler & Koch G3.

== See also ==
- Cristóbal Carbine
- List of assault rifles
