= Atelier Mécanique de Mulhouse =

French arms manufacturer

Atelier Mécanique de Mulhouse (AME), formerly known as Centre d'Études et d'Armement de Mulhouse (CEAM), was a French small arms manufacturer which operated from 1946 to 1967.

== History ==
After World War II, the Mauser firearms factory was captured by French Forces and restarted to supply the French. Mauser's Department 37 development group was placed under control of the French War Department's armament group, Direction des Etudes et Fabrication d'Armement (DEFA). The Mauser factory was renamed the DEFA Development Center, Oberndorf. The French continued work there through 1946, when German workers and equipment began to be transferred to the Mulhouse area of Alsace. The Alsace region was chosen because most of the people were bilingual in French and German. The new facility became the Centre d'Etudes et d'Armement de Mulhouse (CEAM). The transfer of operations to Mulhouse was complete by March 1948. The Mauser factory itself was ultimately destroyed by the French.

In February 1948, former Mauser engineers Ludwig Vorgrimler and Theodor Löffler were assigned the development of roller-delayed carbines for the French. They worked separately on carbines for the experimental 7.65×35mm cartridge, developed by Cartoucherie de Valence. Their carbines were patterned upon the prototype StG45, which had been under development at Mauser prior to the end of the war. The French ultimately abandoned their 7.65×35mm cartridge in favor of the US .30 carbine cartridge. Vorgrimler and Löffler then went to work on roller delayed carbines for the latter cartridge. Ultimately, Löffler's designs won out. Vorgrimler then devoted his efforts to improving Löffler's designs. Eventually, Vorgrimler tired of this and left CEAM at the end of June, 1950. Months later, Vorgrimler joined CETME in Spain.

Löffler's design, designated the Carabine Mitrailleuse Modèle 1950 (CEAM Modèle 1950), was retained for trials among 12 different prototypes designed by CEAM, MAC and MAS. By 1952, the French dropped the idea of making their own carbine, and decided to concentrate on full-power rifles in 7.5×54mm and 7.62×51mm NATO. Accordingly, Löffler began work on roller-delayed rifle designs in these calibers. These included both conventional layout and bullpup configurations.

Also in 1952, CEAM took control of the former Fabrique d'Objets Métalliques du Haut-Rhin (FOMHAR) metalworking factory. Now with manufacturing capability, CEAM gained its independence from MAC, and was renamed Atelier Mécanique de Mulhouse (AME). Löffler ultimately abandoned the roller-delayed principle for conventional gas-operation. By the 1960s, he had left to return to Germany, where he found employment at Rheinmetall.

In 1964, AME's Small Calibre Department was closed. The rest of the factory was closed in 1967.

== Pictures ==
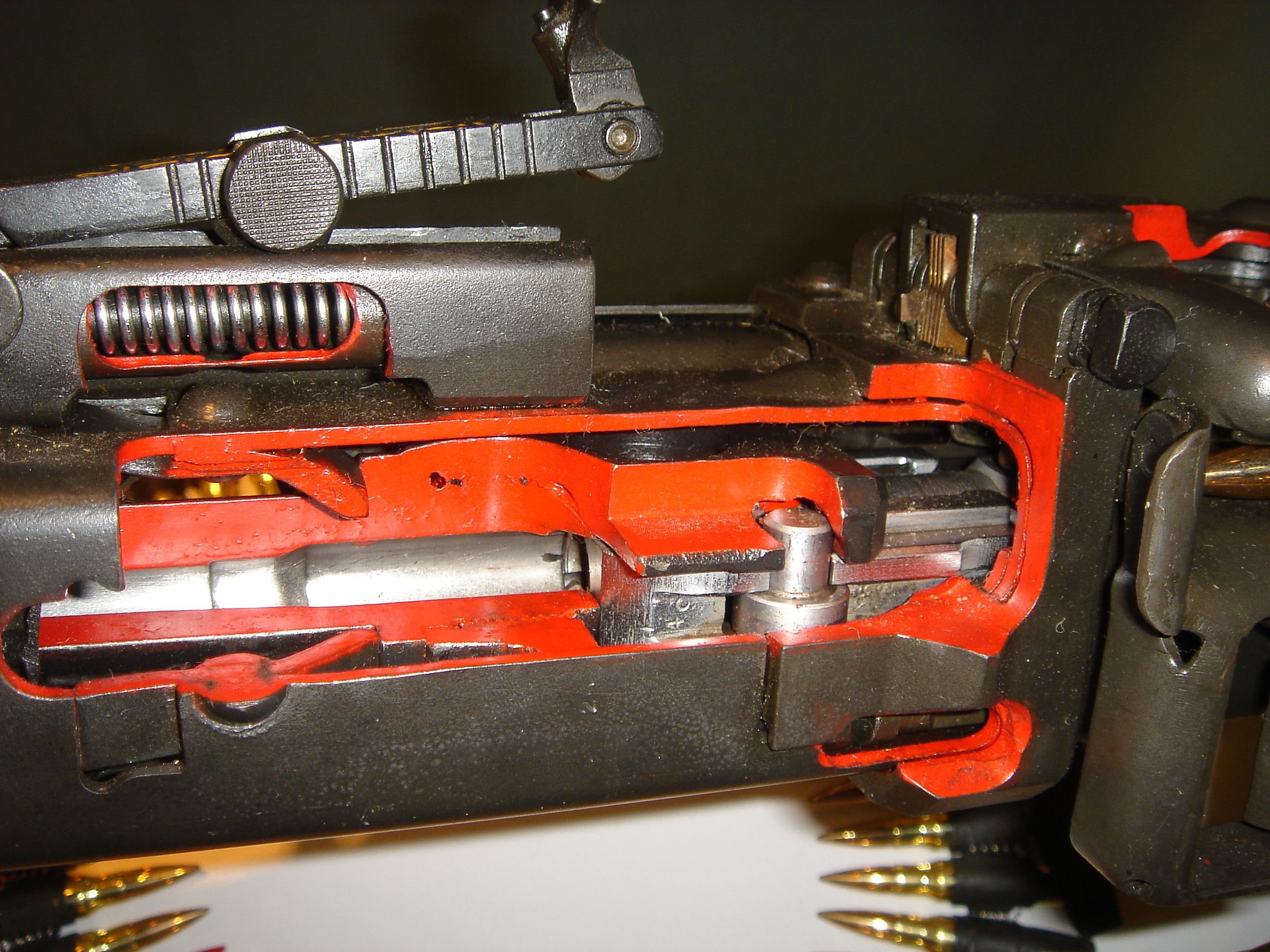
MG42 Roller system

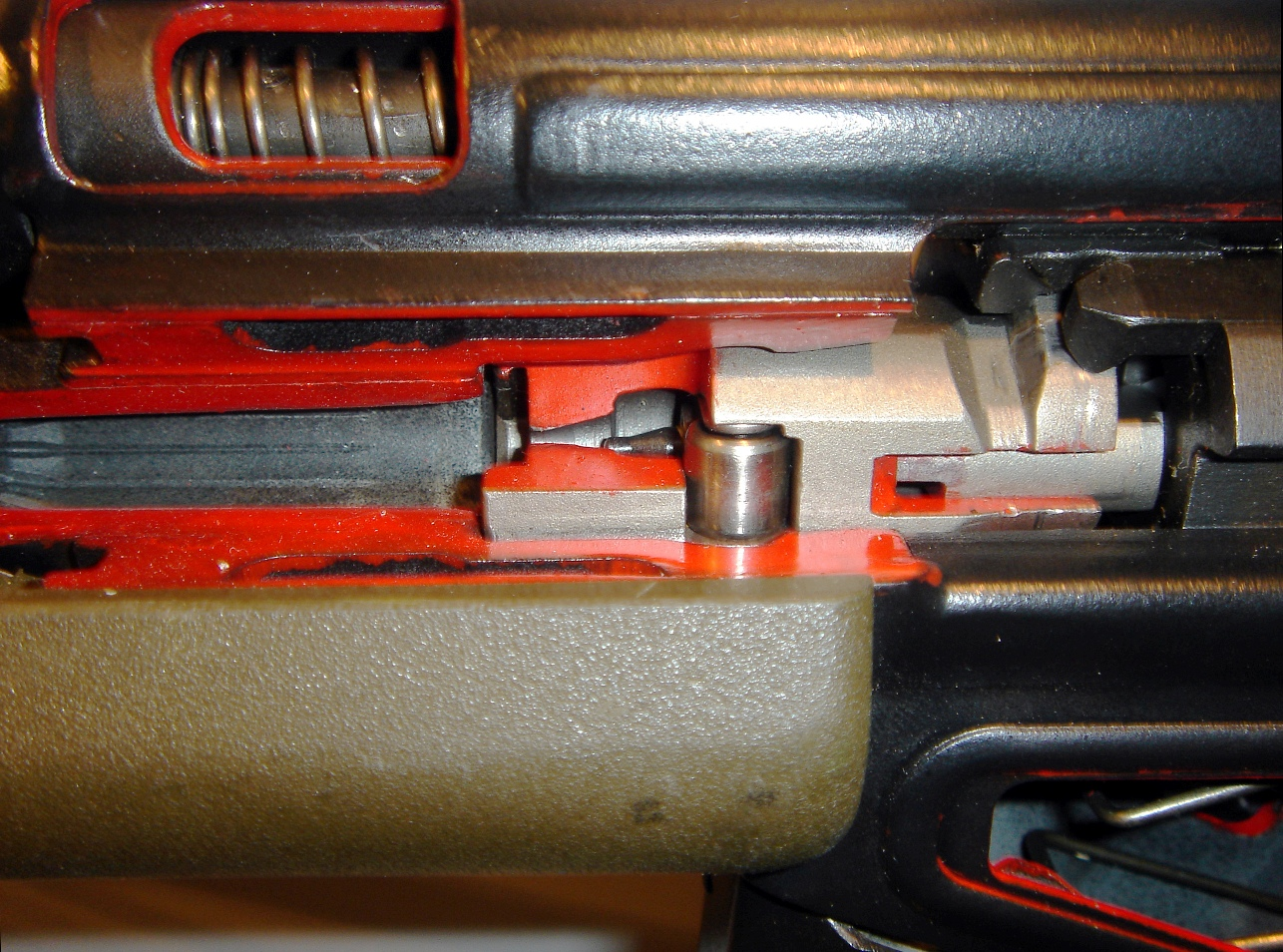
G3 Roller system

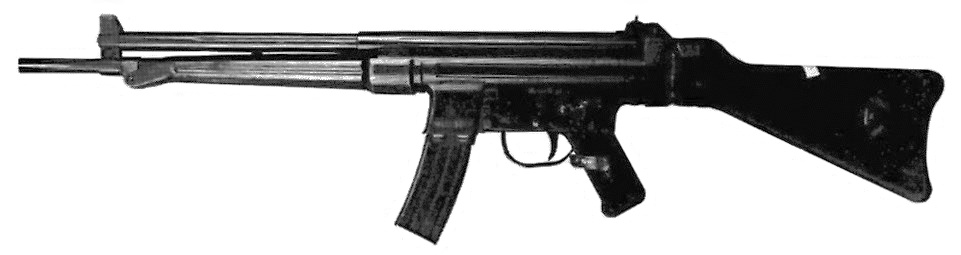
CEAM Modèle 1950, a French StG45 derivative in .30 US Carbine.

== See also ==
- Manufacture d'armes de Châtellerault (MAC)
- Manufacture d'armes de Saint-Étienne (MAS)
- List of firearms
- List of uncommon WW2 weapons
- List of aircraft of the French Air Force during World War II

== Sources and references ==
- Les fusils d'assaut français [The french assault rifles] by Jean Huon, published by Editions Barnett in 1998, ISBN 2-9508308-6-2
- Gotz, Hans Dieter, German Military Rifles and Machine Pistols, 1871-1945, Schiffer Publishing, Ltd. West Chester, Pennsylvania, 1990. OCLC 24416255
- G. de Vries, B.J. Martens: The MP 43, MP 44, StG 44 assault rifles, Propaganda Photos Series, Volume 2, Special Interest Publicaties BV, Arnhem, The Netherlands. First Edition 2001
- Smith, W.H.B, Small arms of the world : the basic manual of military small arms, Harrisburg, Pa. : Stackpole Books, 1955. OCLC 3773343
- Günter Wollert; Reiner Lidschun; Wilfried Kopenhagen, Illustrierte Enzyklopädie der Schützenwaffen aus aller Welt : Schützenwaffen heute (1945–1985), Berlin : Militärverlag der Deutschen Demokratischen Republik, 1988. OCLC 19630248
- Clinton Ezell, Edward Small arms of the world, Eleventh Edition, Arms & Armour Press, London, 1977
- Barnes, Frank C., Cartridges of the World, DBI Books Inc. (1989)
1. "French autoloading rifles. 1898-1979 (Proud promise), by Jean Huon ,1995, Collector Grade Publications. ISBN 0-88935-186-4. This volume (in English) contains a detailed technical chapter describing the Lebel rifle and its ammunition. This volume primarily describes all French semi-automatic rifles since 1898, notably the Mle 1917 and Mle 1918 semi-automatic rifles, the Meunier (A6) rifle as well as the MAS 38-40 to MAS49 and 49/56 series.
2. La Manufacture Nationale d'Armes de Châtellerault (1819-1968), Claude Lombard, 1987, Brissaud, 162 Grande Rue, Poitiers, ISBN 2-902170-55-6. This illustrated volume (in French) contains the production statistics for the Lebel rifle as well as complete technical accounts on the Gras, Kropatschek, Lebel and Berthier weapons and how they came to be designed and manufactured. This is regarded as the fundamental research volume on the subject. The author is a retired armament engineer who spent most of his career at Châtellerault and had full access to all the archives and the prototypes.
3. Military rifle and machine gun cartridges, Jean Huon, 1988, Ironside International Publishers, Alexandria, VA, ISBN 0-935554-05-X. This volume (in English) provides a detailed description of all the types of 8 mm Lebel ammunition, including the Balle D (a.m.). The 7 X 59 mm Meunier cartridge (for the semi-automatic A6 Meunier rifle) is also illustrated and described in detail.
4. Standard Catalog of Military Firearms, Ned Schwing, 2003, Krause Publications, ISBN 0-87349-525-X. Contains an informative and detailed page dedicated to the Lebel rifle ( by David Fortier).
5. The Chauchat Machine Rifle (Honour Bound), Gerard Demaison and Yves Buffetaut, 1995, Collector Grade Publications,ISBN 0-88935-190-2, The 10 pages illustrated appendix at the end of this volume (in English) exhaustively describes all the 8 mm Lebel ball ammunition types, plus the less well-known blank, tracer, armor-piercing, incendiary, dummy and proof rounds. This appendix was documented and authored by internationally known cartridge expert Dr Ph.Regenstreif.
6. Bolt Action Rifles, Frank de Haas and Wayne Van Zwoll, 2003, Krause Publications, ISBN 0-87349-660-4. An illustrated chapter in this volume reviews in depth the Lebel and Berthier rifles (and carbines).
- Ferrard, Stéphane. France 1940 l'armement terrestre, ETAI, 1998, ISBN 2-7268-8380-X

Note: Discussion of weapons manufactured by AME and CEAM have appeared in numerous journals, including: Deutsches Waffen Journal, Visier, Schweizer Waffen Magazin, Internationales Waffen Magazin, Cibles, AMI, Gazette des Armes, Action Guns, Guns & Ammo, American Handgunner, SWAT Magazine, Diana Armi, and Armi & Tiro.
