= Baryshev AVB-7.62 =

Baryshev AB Battle Rifle
- Type: battle rifle
- Place of origin: Soviet Union

Production history
- Designer: Anatoly F. Baryshev
- Designed: 1985
- Variants: AVB-7.62; LCZ B20/CZW-7.62; AB-7.62; LCZ B10; AB-5.45; KPB; ARGB; RAG-30/SAG-30

Specifications
- Mass: 3.9 kg (8.60 lb)
- Length: 1,000 mm (39 in) (750 mm stock folded)
- Barrel length: 455 mm (17.9 in)
- Cartridge: AVB-7.62: 7.62×54mmR; LCZ B20/CZW-7.62: 7.62×51mm; AB-7.62/LCZ B10: 7.62×39mm; ARGB-85/RAG 30: 30mm Grenade
- Action: Delayed-blowback
- Rate of fire: 750 RPM
- Maximum firing range: 800m
- Feed system: 20-round detachable box magazine

AVB-7.62 is a battle rifle designed by Anatoly F. Baryshev that is derived from his weapon operating system. It is characterized by significantly reduced recoil.

== Variants ==
=== AB-7.62 and AB-5.45 ===
The rifle shares nearly 2/3s of its common parts with the AKM and AK-74. The 5.45 version was not developed due to the futility of already low-powered 5.45 cartridges that are not needed to reduce recoil.

The weapon externally differs from the AKMS only in the absence of a gas tube (a carrying handle is installed instead) and a different stock design. Due to such small differences, their balancing is almost the same, although the folding butt is undoubtedly more convenient than AKMS's, but the difference in shooting is significant: the recoil is almost not noticeable, the barrel isn't thrown up, its point of impact is maintained, and the direction of shooting is maintained without effort. Because the 7.62 mm assault rifle cartridge is a softer shooting cartridge, the advantages of the new design become apparent to the shooter after more than one hundred rounds. According to its tactical characteristics, the AB-1(AB-7.62) has almost no difference from the AKM, but it allows the user to perform much more accurate automatic firing at a greater distance.

== Derivatives ==
=== KPB-12.7 and ARGB-85 ===
The ARGB-85 is a 30mm automatic grenade launcher which uses standard VOG-17 grenades. The KPB-12.7 is based on the ARGB-85 and chambered with 12.7×108mm cartridge. It was not to be interested due to its constructive analogy with the ARGB-85.

Test results showed great recoil reduction, making it easily usable as a small arm with half of weight of the pre-existing AGS-17.

Because of Baryshev recoil-reducing operation, this weapon can be fired from the shoulder, but it still has drawbacks that are common with all other Baryshev weapons – insufficient reliability and inferior accuracy when performing single shots more so than conventional weapon mechanisms.

RAG 30 is an (unlicensed) prototype, with ammunition feeding supplied from the magazine located on top of the receiver, thus it is possible to replenish the magazine without removing it.

== See also ==
- AEK-971
- AK-107
- Kord machine gun
- AGS-30
- List of Russian weaponry
- List of firearms
