= Oerlikon SSG36 =

- Type: Anti-tank rifle
- Place of origin: Switzerland

Service history
- Used by: Bolivia
- Wars: Chaco War

Production history
- Manufacturer: Oerlikon-Bührle

Specifications
- Action: API Blowback

The Oerlikon SSG36 is an anti-tank rifle of Swiss origin.

== Overview ==
The Oerlikon SSG36 anti-tank rifle demonstrated, that it was possible to build a successful straight blowback rifle up to 20 mm caliber shooting at 750 m/s (2,500 ft/s) velocity. The SSG36 used a Becker principle of bolt head following the rebated rim cartridge base deep into the chamber. After firing, the case and the bolt could safely back off from the chamber without immediately exposing the base to explode under remaining chamber pressure. The bolt is shown under the barrel with cartridge attached to the protruding bolt head.

The blowback action Oerlikon SSG36 has a deep chamber in which the cartridge totally sinks along with the bolt head. The massive recoil of the 20 mm cartridge was quite effectively tamed by the straight blowback operation and the mass of the bolt creating much less vigorous kick than regular delayed blowback actions.

== Service ==
Some numbers were delivered to Bolivia and saw service during the Chaco War.
