= Blowback (firearms) =

Type of firearm action

Blowback is a system of operation for self-loading firearms that obtains energy from the motion of the cartridge case as it is pushed to the rear by expanding gas created by the ignition of the propellant charge.

Several blowback systems exist within this broad principle of operation, each distinguished by the methods used to control bolt movement. In most actions that use blowback operation, the breech is not locked mechanically at the time of firing: the inertia of the bolt and recoil spring(s), relative to the weight of the bullet, delay opening of the breech until the bullet has left the barrel. A few locked breech designs use a form of blowback (example: primer actuation) to perform the unlocking function.

The blowback principle may be considered a simplified form of gas operation, since the cartridge case behaves like a piston driven by the powder gases. Other operating principles for self-loading firearms include delayed blowback, blow forward, gas operation, and recoil operation.

== Principle of operation ==
Schematic of a blowback operation

In firearms, a blowback system is generally defined as an operating system in which energy to operate the firearm's various mechanisms, and automate the loading of another cartridge, is derived from the inertia of the spent cartridge case being pushed out the rear of the chamber by rapidly expanding gases produced by a burning propellant, typically gunpowder. When a projectile (e.g. bullet) is still within the gun barrel, the high-pressure propellant gas behind it is contained within what could be seen as a closed system, but at the moment it exits the muzzle, this functional seal is broken, allowing the propellant gas to be suddenly released in an explosive muzzle blast. The expanding gas also creates a jet propulsion effect rearward in the barrel against the spent cartridge case. This "blowback" is the predominant component of the recoil. Some guns use energy from blowback to perform the automatic bolt cycling /reloading process, while others will use a portion of the blowback to operate only certain parts of the cycle or simply use the blowback energy to enhance the operational energy from another system of automatic operation.

What is common to all blowback systems is that the cartridge case must move under the direct action of the powder pressure; therefore, any gun in which the bolt is not rigidly locked (and is thus permitted to move while there remains gas pressure in the chamber) will undergo a degree of blowback action. The energy from the expansion of gases upon firing appears in the form of kinetic energy transmitted to the bolt mechanism, which is controlled and used to operate the firearm's operation cycle. The extent to which blowback is employed largely depends on the manner used to control the movement of the bolt and the proportion of energy drawn from other systems of operation. How the movement of the bolt is controlled is where blowback systems differ. Blowback operation is most often divided into three categories, all using residual pressure to complete the cycle of operation: "simple blowback" (often just "blowback"), "delayed/retarded blowback", and "advanced primer ignition".

Relating blowback to other types of automatic firearm operation, George M. Chinn wrote that: "In the larger sense, blowback might well be considered a special form of gas operation. This is reasonable because the cartridge case may be conceived of as a sort of piston driven by the powder gases. Actually, blowback involves so many special problems that it is best considered to be in a class by itself. The question whether or not it should be included within the more general class of gas operation or recoil operation is purely academic. The important point is that it partakes some of the properties of both classes and, depending on the particular problem at hand, may be considered to be either one."

== History ==
In 1663 a mention is made in the journal of the Royal Society for that year of an engineer who came to Prince Rupert with an automatic weapon, though how it worked is unknown. In 1854 a hydropneumatically delayed-blowback cannon was patented by Henry Bessemer. In 1856 a crank-operated cannon with a blowback-operated cocking mechanism was patented in the US by Charles E. Barnes. In 1876 a single-shot breech-loading rifle with an automatic breech-opening and cocking mechanism using a form of blowback was patented in Britain and America by the American Bernard Fasoldt. In 1883 Hiram Maxim patented a blowback-operated rifle. In 1884 he would also patent a toggle-lock delayed-blowback-operated rifle. Also in 1884, a few months after Maxim, a British patent for blowback-operated pistols and rifles was filed by Richard Paulson. In 1887 a patent was filed by an American inventor called Carl J. Bjerkness for a blowback-operated rifle. In 1888 a delayed-blowback machine gun known as the Skoda was invented by Grand Duke Karl Salvator and Colonel von Dormus of Austria.

== Simple blowback ==
Animation of simple blowback operation

The reason why delayed blowback was invented. The schematic shows the hazards of using a simple blowback operation with rifle rounds (left) and higher than average pressure pistol rounds (right).

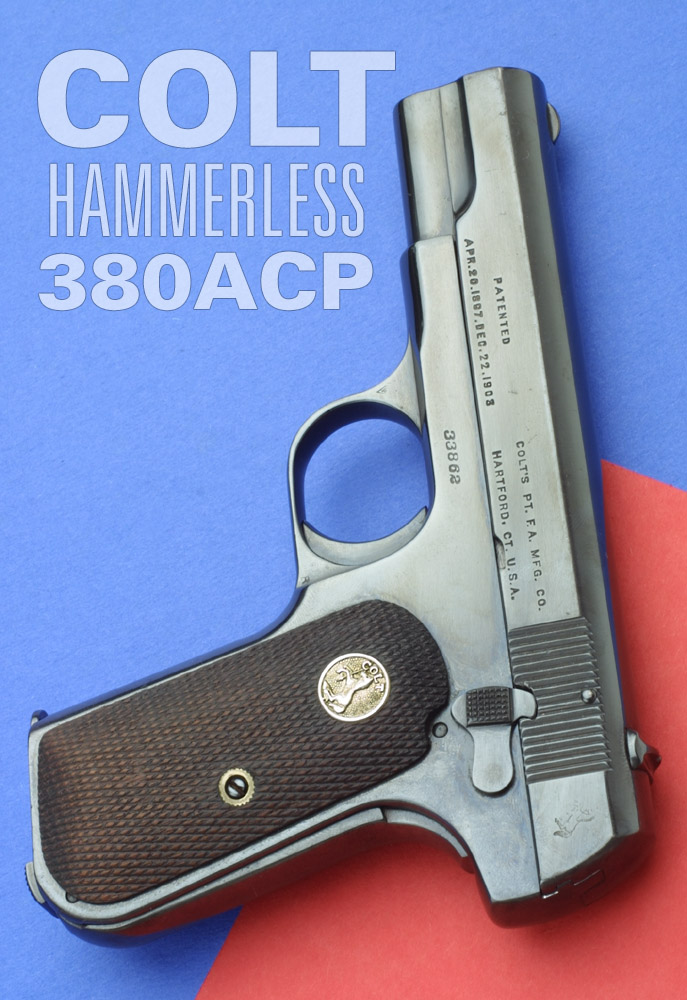
The .380 ACP Colt Model 1903 Pocket Hammerless uses simple blowback. The mass of the slide is enough to delay opening of the chamber until pressure has dropped.

The blowback (sometimes referred to as "simple", "straight" or "pure" blowback) system represents the most basic auto loading operation type. In a blowback mechanism, the bolt rests against the rear of the barrel, but is not locked in place. At the point of ignition, expanding gases push the bullet forward through the barrel while at the same time pushing the case rearward against the bolt. The expanding gases push the bolt assembly to the rear, but the motion is slowed by the mass of the bolt, internal friction, and the force required to compress the action spring. The design must ensure that the delay is long enough that the bullet exits the barrel before the cartridge case clears the chamber. The empty case is ejected as the bolt travels to the rear. The stored energy of the compressed action spring then drives the bolt forward (although not until the trigger is pulled if the weapon fires from an open bolt). A new cartridge is stripped from the magazine and chambered as the bolt returns to its in-battery position.

The blowback system is practical for firearms using relatively low-power cartridges with lighter weight bullets. Higher power cartridges require heavier bolts (typically 20lbs) to keep the breech from opening prematurely; at some point, the bolt becomes too heavy to be practical. For an extreme example, a 20 mm cannon using simple blowback and lubricated cartridges would need a 500-pound (230 kg) bolt to keep the cartridge safely in the barrel during the first few milliseconds. Yet the bolt must cycle far enough back to eject the spent casing and load a new round, which would limit the return spring to an average force of 60 pounds-force (270 N). The resulting system, if it could be built, would not have enough energy to cycle reliably or even keep the bolt closed when the gun is tilted up.

Due to the required bolt weight (typically 1lbs/2lbs), blowback designs in pistols are generally limited to calibers smaller than 9×19mm Parabellum (e.g., .25 ACP, .32 ACP, .380 ACP, 9×18mm Makarov, etc.) There are exceptions such as the simple blowback pistols from Hi-Point Firearms which include models chambered in .40 S&W and .45 ACP. Simple blowback operation can also be found in small-bore (such as .22LR) semi-automatic rifles, carbines and submachine guns. Most simple blowback rifles are chambered for the .22 Long Rifle cartridge. Popular examples include the Marlin Model 60 and the Ruger 10/22. Most blowback carbines and submachine guns are chambered for pistol cartridges such as the 9×19mm Parabellum, .40 S&W and .45 ACP. Examples include the MP 40, Sten and UZI. The bolt can be made bigger and more massive in these weapons than in handguns, as they are intrinsically heavier and designed, ideally at least, to be fired with both hands, often with the aid of a shoulder stock; and these factors help to ameliorate the disruption to the shooter's aim caused by the heavy bolt's movement. Consequently, simple blowback is adequate for somewhat more powerful rounds in submachine guns than in standard pistols. The barrel usually requires a short length in simple blowback firearms as this is to prevent rupturing cartridges (even low pressure examples). One of the very few known simple blowback firearms capable of firing fully powered rifle cartridges was the Brixia 930 light machine gun, that required a large bolt to handle the pressure of the round as well as a spring buffer shock absorbing butt plate on the stock to handle recoil. There were also a few rifles that chambered cartridges specifically designed for blowback operation. Examples include the Winchester Model 1905, 1907 and 1910. The only known assault rifle to use simple blowback was the Burton Model 1917.

Although simple blowback is limited to guns using low-power rounds, it is so efficient that in small-calibre semi-automatic pistols it has become almost ubiquitous. Heavier calibre semiautomatic handguns typically employ a short recoil system, of which by far the most common type are Browning-derived designs which rely on a locking barrel and slide assembly instead of blowback. But blowback guns can be used to fire powerful cartridges if they are of the other two types: API or delayed blowback.

== Advanced primer ignition (API) blowback ==
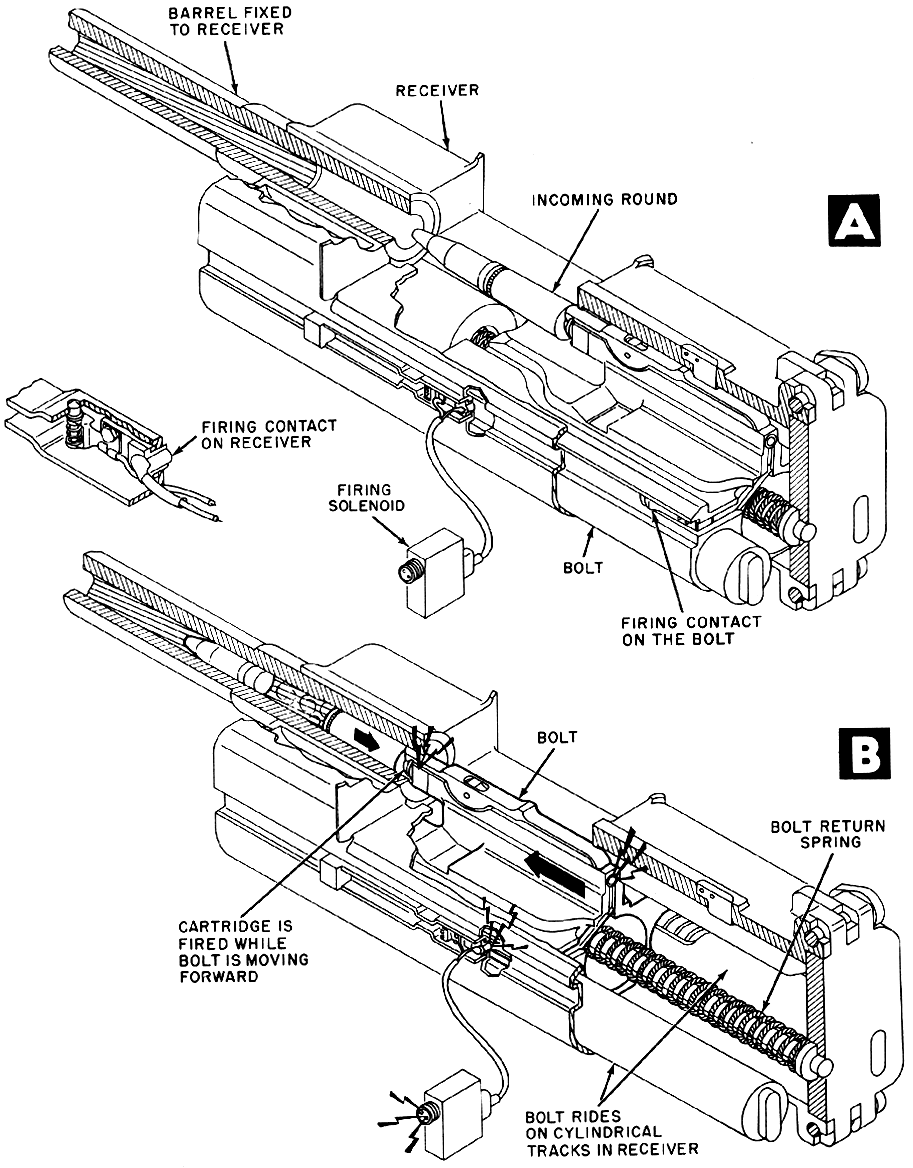
MK 108 cannon bolt cycle (part I)

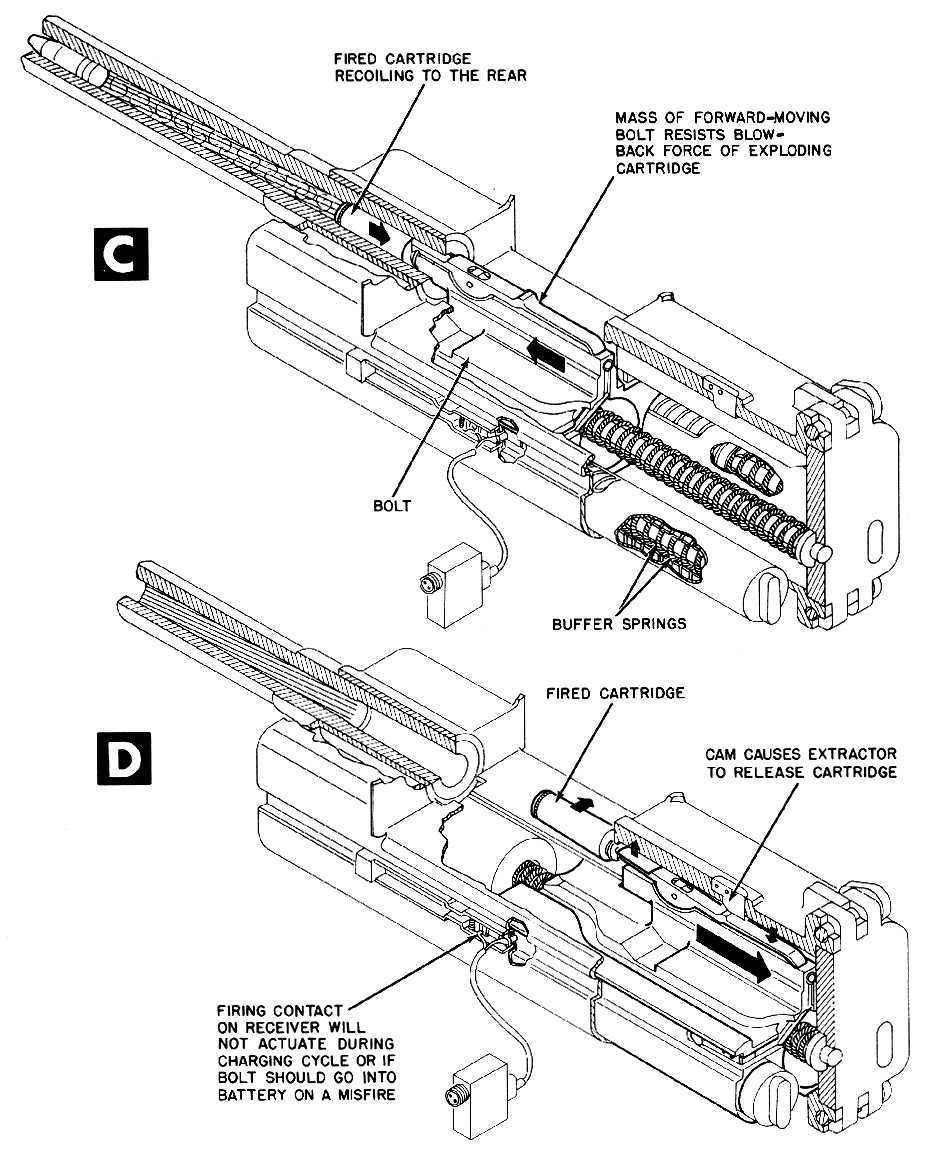
MK 108 cannon bolt cycle (part II)

In the API blowback design, the primer is ignited when the bolt is still moving forward and before the cartridge is fully chambered (akin to the fire-out-of-battery principle used in some mountain guns like Canon de 65 M (montagne) modele 1906, although there the bolt is locked and whole ordnance is moving at fire). This requires a very careful design to ensure the proper balance and equalization of forces between the projectile weight, propellant charge, barrel length, bolt weight, and return spring strength. In a simple blowback design, the propellant gases have to overcome static inertia to accelerate the bolt rearwards to open the breech. In an API blowback, they first have to do the work of overcoming forward momentum to arrest the forward motion of the bolt. Because the forward and rearward speeds of the bolt tend to be approximately the same, the API blowback allows the weight of the bolt to be halved. Because the momentum of the two opposed bolt motions cancels out over time, the API blowback design results in reduced recoil.

Advanced primer ignition (API) was originally developed by Reinhold Becker for use on the Becker Type M2 20 mm cannon. It became a feature of a wide range of designs that can be traced back to Becker's, including the Oerlikon cannon widely used as anti-aircraft weapons during World War II.

To increase performance of API blowback firearms, larger calibre APIB guns such as the Becker and Oerlikon use extended chambers, longer than is necessary to contain the round, and ammunition for APIB firearms come with straight-sided cartridges with rebated rims (rims that are smaller in diameter than the cartridge itself). The last part of forward motion and the first part of the rearward motion of the case and bolt happen within the confines of this extended chamber. As long as the gas pressure in the barrel is high, the walls of the case remain supported and the breach sealed, although the case is sliding rearwards. This sliding motion of the case, while it is expanded by a high internal gas pressure, risks tearing it apart, and a common solution is to grease the ammunition to reduce the friction. The case needs to have a rebated rim because the front end of the bolt will enter the chamber, and the extractor claw hooked over the rim therefore has to fit also within the diameter of the chamber. The case generally has very little neck, because this remains unsupported during the firing cycle and is generally deformed; a strongly necked case would be likely to split.

The API blowback design permits the use of more powerful ammunition in a lighter gun than would be achieved by using simple blowback, and the reduction of felt recoil results in further weight savings. The original Becker cannon, firing 20×70mmRB ammunition, was developed to be carried by World War I aircraft, and weighed only 30 kg. Oerlikon even produced an anti-tank rifle firing 20×110mmRB ammunition using the API blowback operation, the SSG36. On the other hand, because the design imposes a very close relationship between bolt mass, chamber length, spring strength, ammunition power and rate of fire, in APIB guns high rate of fire and high muzzle velocity tend to be mutually exclusive. API blowback guns also have to fire from an open bolt, which is not conducive to accuracy and also prevents synchronized fire through an aircraft propeller arc.

According to a United States Army Materiel Command engineering course from 1970, "The advanced primer ignition gun is superior to the simple blowback because of its higher firing rate and lower recoil momentum. However, favorable performance depends on timing that must be precise. A slight delay in primer function, and the gun reverts to a simple blowback without the benefit of a massive bolt and stiffer driving spring to soften the recoil impact. [...] The exacting requirements in design and construction of gun and ammunition reduce this type almost to the point of academic interest only."

API mechanisms are very sensitive to the ammunition used. For example, when the Germans switched their MG FF (an Oerlikon FFF derivative) to their new, lighter mine shell, they had to rebalance the spring strength and bolt weight of the gun, resulting in a new MG FF/M model with ammunition not being interchangeable between the two models. The 30 mm MK 108 cannon was perhaps the apogee of API blowback technology during World War II.

The principle is also used in some automatic grenade launchers, for example in the US Mk 19 grenade launcher or Russian AGS-30.

=== Extended chamber blowback ===
Schematic of an Extended Chamber Blowback operation

A closed bolt firing equivalent of Advanced Primer Ignition that uses straight-sided rebated rim cartridges in an extended deeper chambering to contain the gas pressure slightly longer until it reaches a safe level to extract. This operation is almost similar to a simple blowback operation, API blowback firearms that have fired the round at the point where the cartridge is fully chambered operate in a similar way.

== Delayed blowback ==
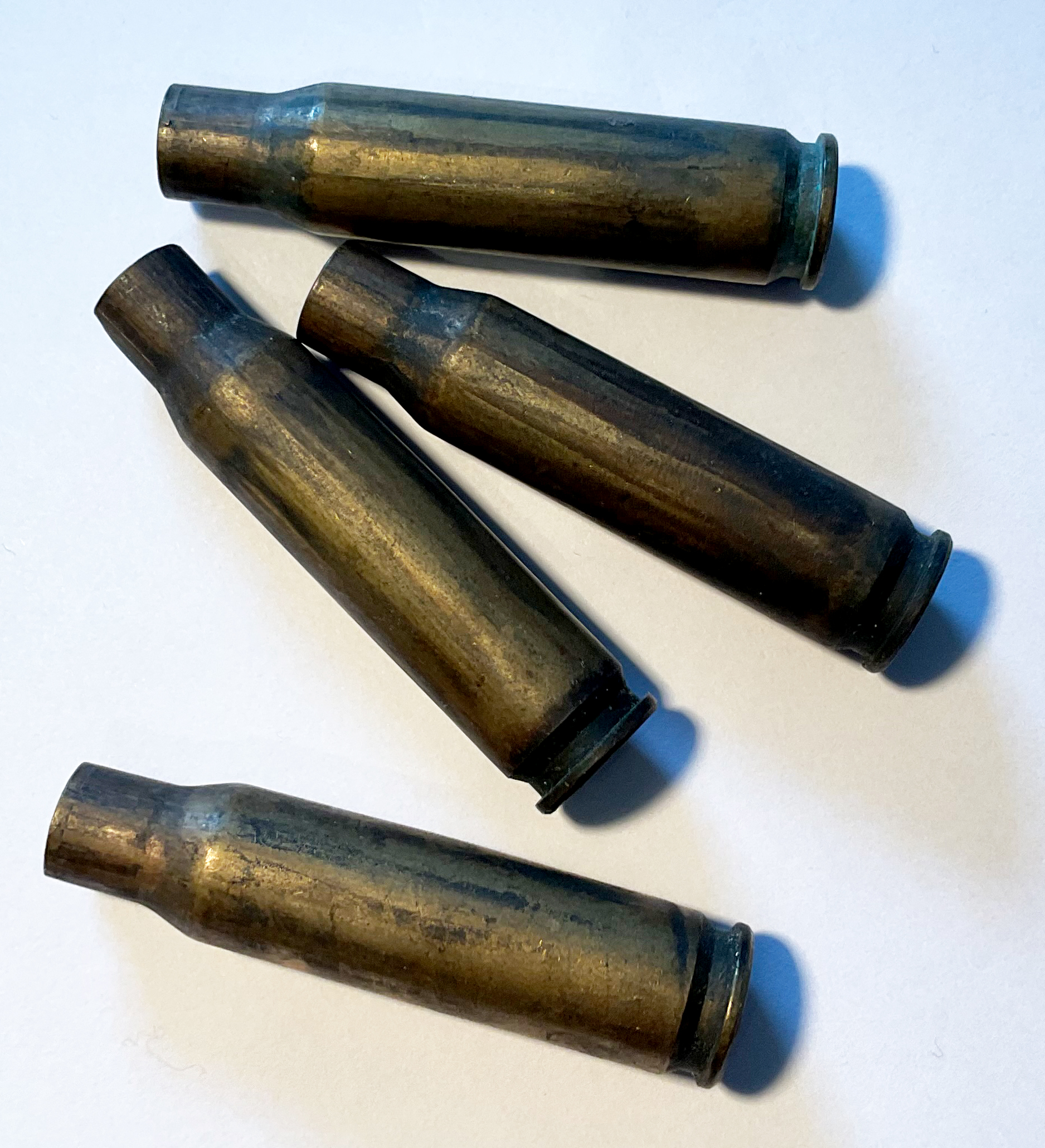
7.62x51mm NATO rounds from a delayed blowback firearm. Note the scorch marks from the fluted chamber

Stepped ring fluted chamber

For more powerful rounds that cannot be safely used in simple blowback, or in order to obtain a lighter mechanism than the simple format can provide, the alternative to API is some system of delayed or retarded blowback, in which the bolt is never fully locked, but is initially held in place, sealing the cartridge in the chamber by the mechanical resistance of one of various designs of delaying mechanism. As with the resistance provided by momentum in API, it takes a fraction of a second for the propellant gases to overcome this and start moving cartridge and bolt backwards; this very brief delay is sufficient for the bullet to leave the muzzle and for the internal pressure in the barrel to decrease to a safe level. The bolt and cartridge are then pushed to the rear by the residual gas pressure.

Delayed blowback operations do away with the complexity of gas or recoil operations, using only a few simple solid components centralizing the main moving parts into the receiver. Because of high pressures, rifle-caliber delayed blowback firearms, such as the FAMAS, AA-52 and G3, typically have fluted chambers to ease extraction. Below are various forms of delayed-blowback actions:

=== Roller-delayed ===
Roller-delayed blowback-operated breech for automatic weapons

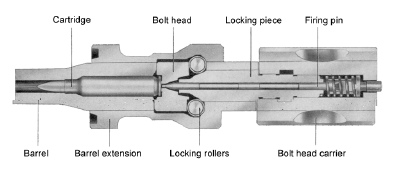
A schematic of the G3 roller-delayed blowback mechanism

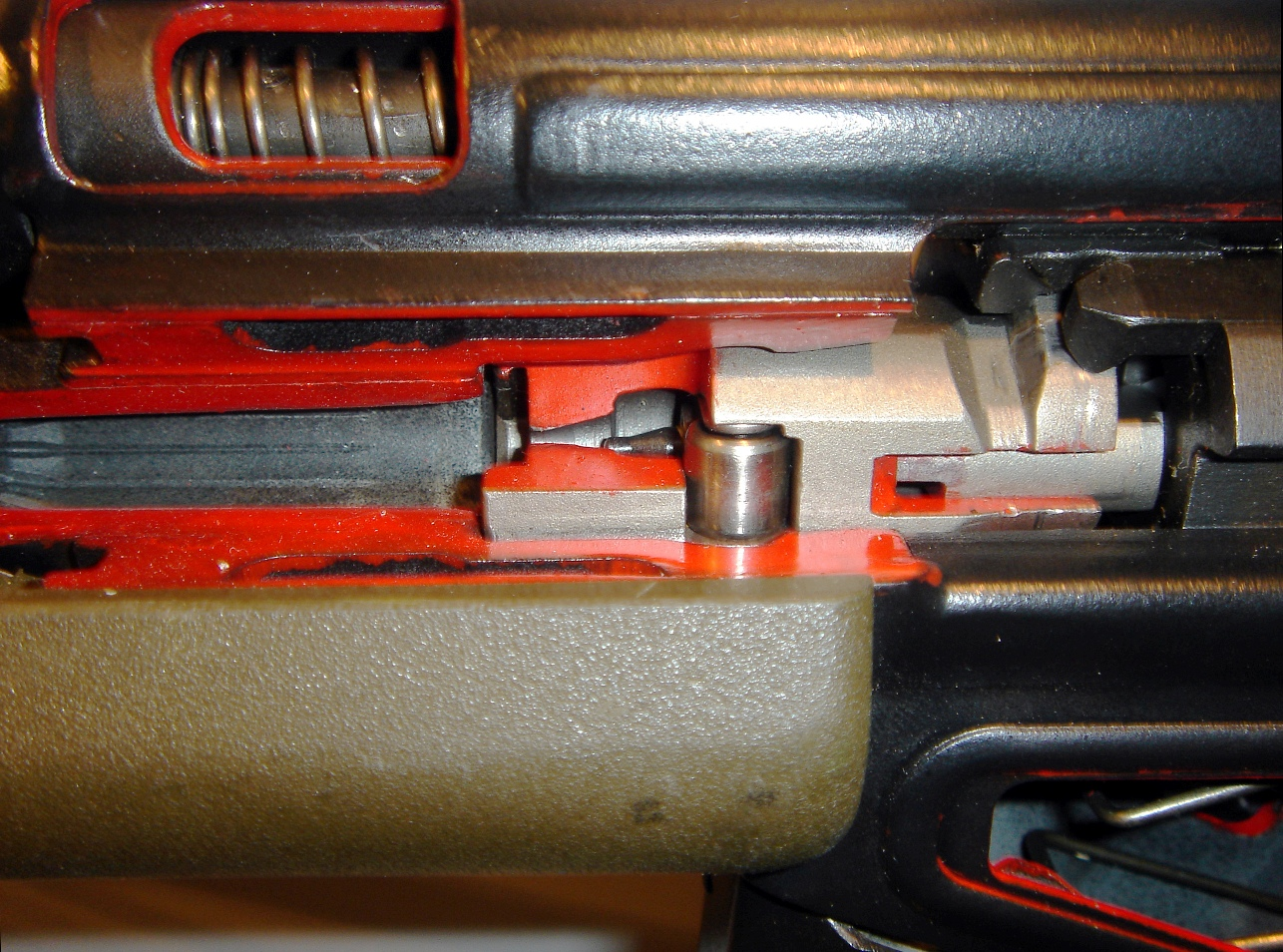
Cutaway model of the chamber with gas relief flutes (left) and roller-delayed action of the G3 battle rifle

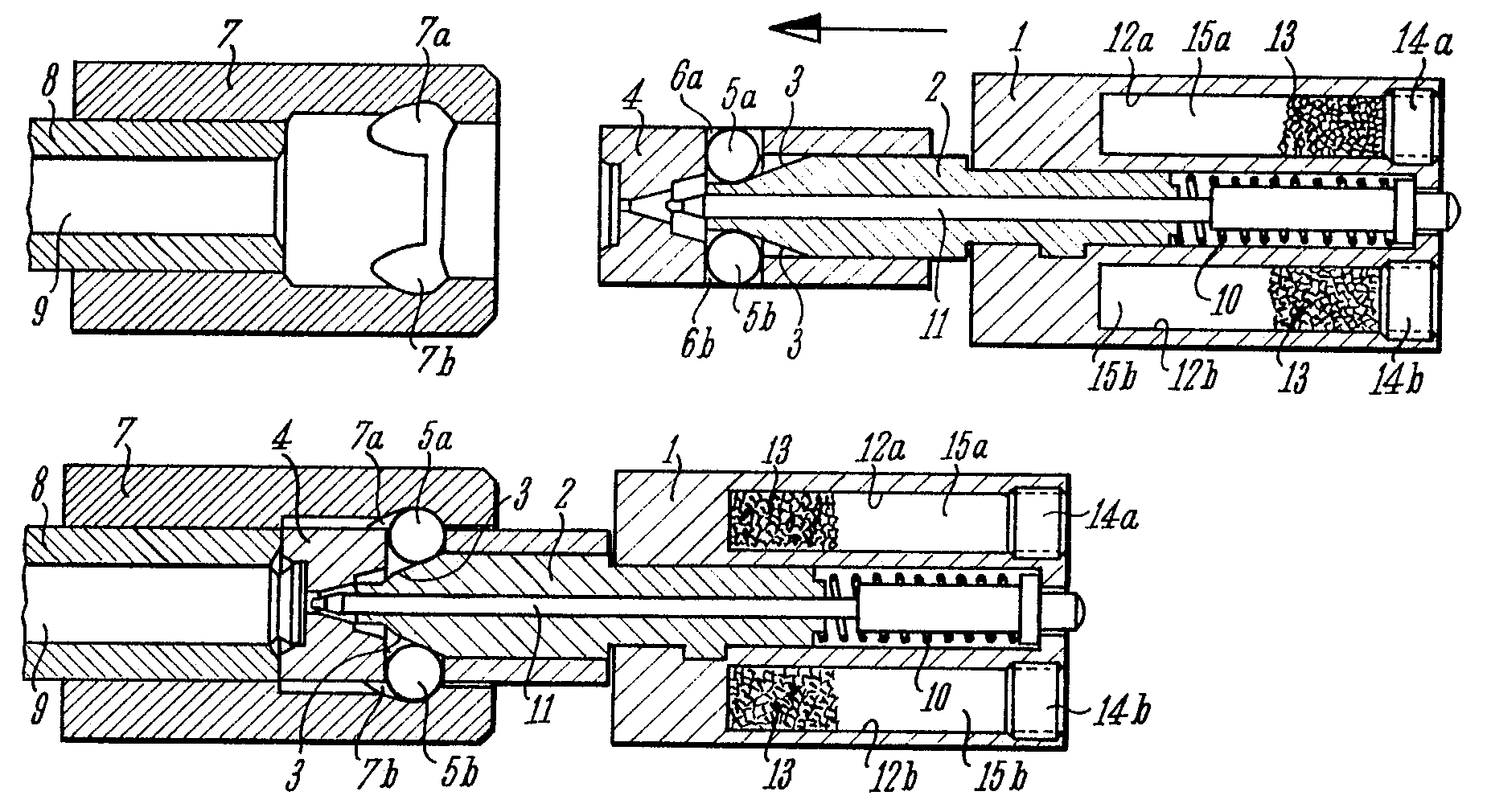
A schematic of the roller-delayed blowback mechanism used in the MP5 submachine gun. This system had its origins in the late-war StG 45(M) assault rifle prototype.

Roller-delayed blowback was first used in Mauser's Gerät 06H prototype. Roller-delayed blowback operation differs from roller-locked recoil operation as seen in the MG 42 and gas operated roller locked, as seen in the Gerät 03 and Gerät 06. Unlike the MG 42, in roller-delayed blowback the barrel is fixed and does not recoil, and unlike the Gerät 03 and Gerät 06 and StG 44, roller-delayed blowback systems lack a gas piston. These omissions are conducive to relatively light construction by significantly reducing the number of parts required and the amount of machining required to produce a rifle. As the bolt head is driven rearward, rollers on the sides of the bolt are driven inward against a tapered bolt carrier extension. This forces the bolt carrier rearward at a much greater velocity and delays movement of the bolt head. The primary advantage of roller-delayed blowback is the simplicity of the design compared to gas or recoil operation.

The roller-delayed blowback firearm action was patented by Mauser's Wilhelm Stähle and Ludwig Vorgrimler. Though appearing simple, its development during World War II was a hard technical and personal effort, as German engineering, mathematical and other scientists had to work together on a like-it-or-not basis led by Ott-Helmuth von Lossnitzer, the director of Mauser Werke's Weapons Research Institute and Weapons Development Group. Experiments showed roller-delayed blowback firearms exhibited bolt-bounce as the bolt opened at an extreme velocity of approximately 20 m/s (66 ft/s) during automatic fire. To counter bolt-bounce the perfect angle choice on the nose of the bolt head had to be found to significantly reduce the opening velocity of the bolt. The extremely high bolt carrier velocities problem was not solved by trial and error. Mathematician Karl Maier provided analysis of the components and assemblies in the development project. In December 1943 Maier came up with an equation that engineers used to change the angles in the receiver to 45° and 27° on the locking piece relative to the longitudinal axis reducing the bolt-bounce problem. With these angles the geometrical transmission ratio of the bolt carrier to the bolthead became 3:1, so the rear bolt carrier was forced to move 3 times faster than the bolthead. The rearward forces on the bolt carrier and receiver were 2:1. The force and impulse transmitted to the receiver increases with the force and impulse transmitted to the bolt carrier. Making the bolt carrier heavier lessens the recoil velocity. For Mauser's StG 45(M) project Maier assumed a 120 g (4.2 oz) bolt head and 360 g (12.7 oz) bolt carrier (1 to 3 ratio). The prototype StG 45 (M) assault rifle had 18 longitudinal gas relief flutes cut in the chamber wall to assist the bloated cartridge casing from the chamber walls during extraction. Fluting the end of the chamber provides pressure equalization between the front outer surface of the cartridge case and its interior and thus ensures extraction without tearing the case making extraction easier and more reliable. In 1944 other German companies like Großfuß, Rheinmetall and C.G. Haenel showed interest in developing roller-delayed blowback small arms. Großfuß worked on a roller-delayed blowback MG 45 general-purpose machine gun that, like the StG 45 (M), had not progressed beyond the prototype stage by the end of World War II.

After World War II, former Mauser engineers Ludwig Vorgrimler and Theodor Löffler perfected the mechanism between 1946 and 1950 while working for the French small arms manufacturer Centre d'Etudes et d'Armament de Mulhouse (CEAM). In 1950 Ludwig Vorgrimler was recruited to work for CETME in Spain. The first full-scale production rifle to utilize roller-delay was the Spanish CETME battle rifle, which was closely followed by the Swiss SIG SG 510 and the CETME Model B-based Heckler & Koch G3. The G3 bolt features an anti-bounce mechanism that prevents the bolt from bouncing off the barrel's breech surface. The G3's "bolt head locking lever" is a spring-loaded claw mounted on the bolt carrier that grabs the bolt head as the bolt carrier group goes into battery. The lever essentially ratchets into place with friction, providing enough resistance to being re-opened that the bolt carrier does not rebound. Due to the relative low bolt thrust exhibited by pistol cartridges the anti-bounce mechanism is omitted by Heckler & Koch on their roller-delayed blowback firearms chambered for pistol cartridges. Heckler & Koch's MP5 submachine gun is the most common weapon still in service worldwide using this system. The Heckler & Koch P9 semi-automatic pistol, CETME Ameli light machine gun, SIG MG 710-3, Heckler & Koch HK21 and Ohio Ordnance REAPR general-purpose machine guns also use it.

Roller-delayed blowback arms are ammunition specific, since they lack an adjustable gas port or valve to adjust the arm to various propellant and projectile specific pressure behavior. Their reliable functioning is limited by specific ammunition and arm parameters like bullet weight, propellant charge, barrel length and amount of wear. At the moment of cartridge ignition the chamber has to be and remain sealed, until the bullet has exited the barrel and the gas pressure within the bore has dropped to a safe level before the seal is broken and chamber starts to open. For obtaining a proper and safe functioning parameters bandwidth arms manufactures offer a variety of locking pieces with different mass and shoulder angles and cylindrical rollers with different diameters. The angles are critical and determine the unlock timing and gas pressure drop management as the locking piece acts in unison with the bolt head carrier. The bolt gap width determines the headspace and hence the correct positioning of the cartridges in the (closed) chamber. Due to usage wear the bolt gap between the locking piece and bolt head carrier is expected to gradually increase. It can be determined and checked by a feeler gauge measurement and can be altered by changing the cylindrical rollers for rollers with a different diameter. Installing larger diameter rollers will increase the bolt gap and push the locking piece forward. Installing smaller diameter rollers results in the reverse effects.

=== Bearing delay ===
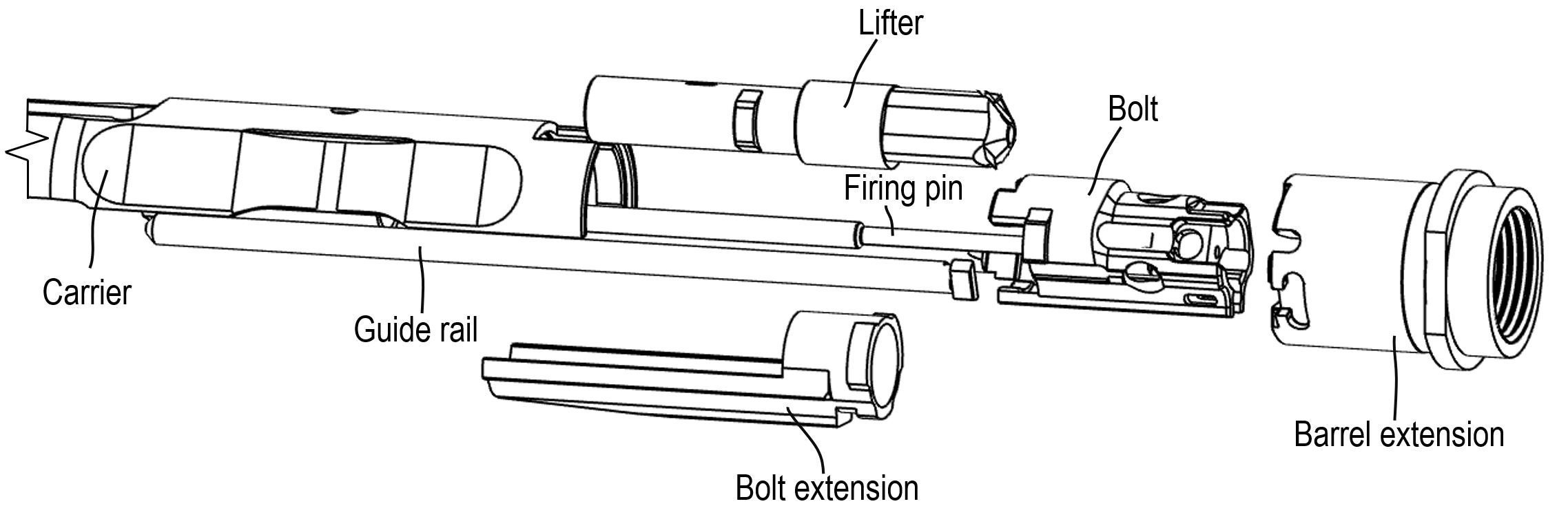
Exploded view of primary components for bearing delay bolt carrier group

Bearing delay blowback uses a plurality of ball bearings to delay the movement of the bolt carrier group after firing. It is designed to be tuned based on the user's preference or configuration of other components by swapping to a lifter with a different geometry.

=== Lever-delayed ===
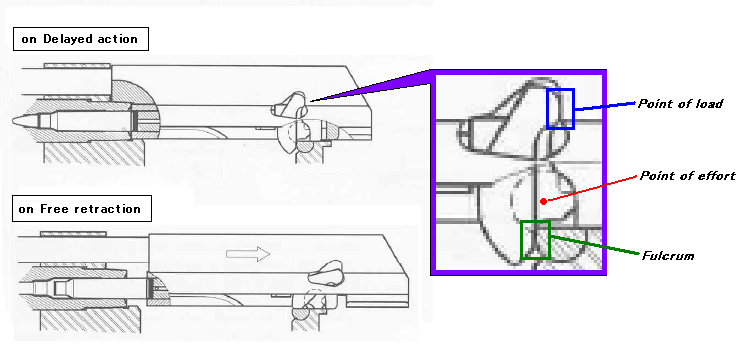
A schematic of the lever-delayed blowback mechanism used in the FAMAS assault rifle.

Lever-delayed blowback utilizes leverage to put the bolt at a mechanical disadvantage, delaying the opening of the breech. When the cartridge pushes against the bolt face, the lever moves the bolt carrier rearward at an accelerated rate relative to the light bolt. Leverage can be applied with a dedicated part or through inclined surfaces interacting with each other. This leverage significantly increases resistance and slows the movement of the lightweight bolt. The reliable functioning of lever-delayed blowback arms is limited by specific ammunition and arm parameters like bullet weight, propellant charge, barrel length and amount of wear. John Pedersen patented one of the first known designs for a lever-delay system. The mechanism was also used by Hungarian arms designer Pál Király in the 1910s and 1930s and used in the Danuvia 39M and 43M submachine guns for the Hungarian Army. After World War II, Király settled in the Dominican Republic and developed the Cristóbal Carbine (or Király-Cristóbal Carbine) employing a similar mechanism. Other weapons to use this system are the Hogue Avenger and Benelli B76 pistols, the FNAB-43 submachine gun, the TKB-517, VAHAN and FAMAS assault rifles, the Sterling 7.62 and AVB-7.62 battle rifles/light machine guns, and the AA-52 general-purpose machine gun.

=== Gas-delayed ===
Gas-delayed blowback should not be confused with gas-operation. In gas-delayed guns the bolt is never locked, and so is pushed rearward by the expanding propellant gases, as in other blowback-based designs. However, propellant gases are vented from the barrel into a cylinder with a piston that delays the opening of the bolt. It was used in the Krag–Jørgensen pistol and in some World War II German designs for the 7.92×33mm Kurz cartridge, including the Volkssturmgewehr rifle (with little effectiveness) and the Grossfuss Sturmgewehr (with slightly more efficiency), and after the war by the Heckler & Koch P7, Walther CCP, Shevchenko PSh, Steyr GB and M-77B pistols. In recent years it was used in Laugo Alien pistol.

=== Chamber-ring-delayed ===
Chamber-ring-delayed blowback

When a cartridge is fired, the case expands to seal the sides of the chamber. This seal prevents high-pressure gas from escaping into the action of the gun. Because a conventional chamber is slightly oversized, an unfired cartridge will enter freely. In a chamber-ring delayed firearm, the chamber is conventional in every respect except for a concave ring within the chamber wall. When the cartridge is fired, the case expands into this recessed ring and pushes the bolt face rearward. As the case moves to the rear this ring constricts the expanded portion of the case. The energy required to squeeze the walls of the cartridge case slows the rearward travel of the case and slide, reducing their mass requirements. The first known use of the system was on the Fritz Mann pistol in 1920 and later on the High Standard Corp model T3 experimental pistol developed by Ott-Helmuth von Lossnitzer while working for High Standard. Other firearms that used this system were the LWS Seecamp pistol, the AMT AutoMag II, and the Kimball .30 Carbine pistol. The SIG SG 510 rifle family incorporates a stepped & fluted chamber ring near the shoulder of the cartridge which is used to avoid bolt-bounce rather than a delay element.

Similar operations exist using a fluted chamber for delay. When the round is fired, the cartridge sticks to the fluted chamber walls making a slight delay of extraction. The prototype 6x45mm SAW caliber Brunswick light machine gun is an example that used this operation.

Another example using a ported chamber that uses a barrel chamber with pressure relief ports that allow gas to leak into an annular chamber during extraction. Basically the opposite of a fluted chamber lubrication as it is intended for the cartridge to stick to the chamber wall making a slight delay of extraction. This requires a welded-on sleeve with an internal annular groove to contain the pressure.

=== Hesitation locked ===
Hesitation locked blowback (schematic shows example using a tilting bolt)

John Pedersen's patented system incorporates a breech block independent of the slide or bolt carrier. When in battery, the breech block rests slightly forward of the locking shoulder located in the frame of the firearm. When the cartridge is fired, the cartridge case, bolt and slide move together a short distance until the breech block strikes the locking shoulder and stops. The slide continues rearward with the momentum it acquired in the initial phase while the breech remains locked. This allows chamber pressure to drop to safe levels once the bullet departs the barrel. The continuing motion of the slide lifts the breech block from its recess and pulls it rearward, continuing the firing cycle. Straight-walled cartridges are used in this operation as they are less prone to rupturing than tapered (conical) cartridges in firearms with bolt operations that instantly retract rounds when under high pressure from the chamber when firing. The Remington Model 51 and R51 pistols, SIG MKMO submachine gun, Star Si 35 submachine gun are the only production firearms to have used this design.

=== Flywheel delayed blowback ===
Flywheel delayed blowback operation is where, during firing, the bolt opening is delayed by the rotational inertia of a flywheel. This is driven by a rack and pinion arrangement on the bolt carrier. The Barnitzke, Kazachok SMG, and the MGD PM-9 uses this operation.

=== Toggle-delayed ===
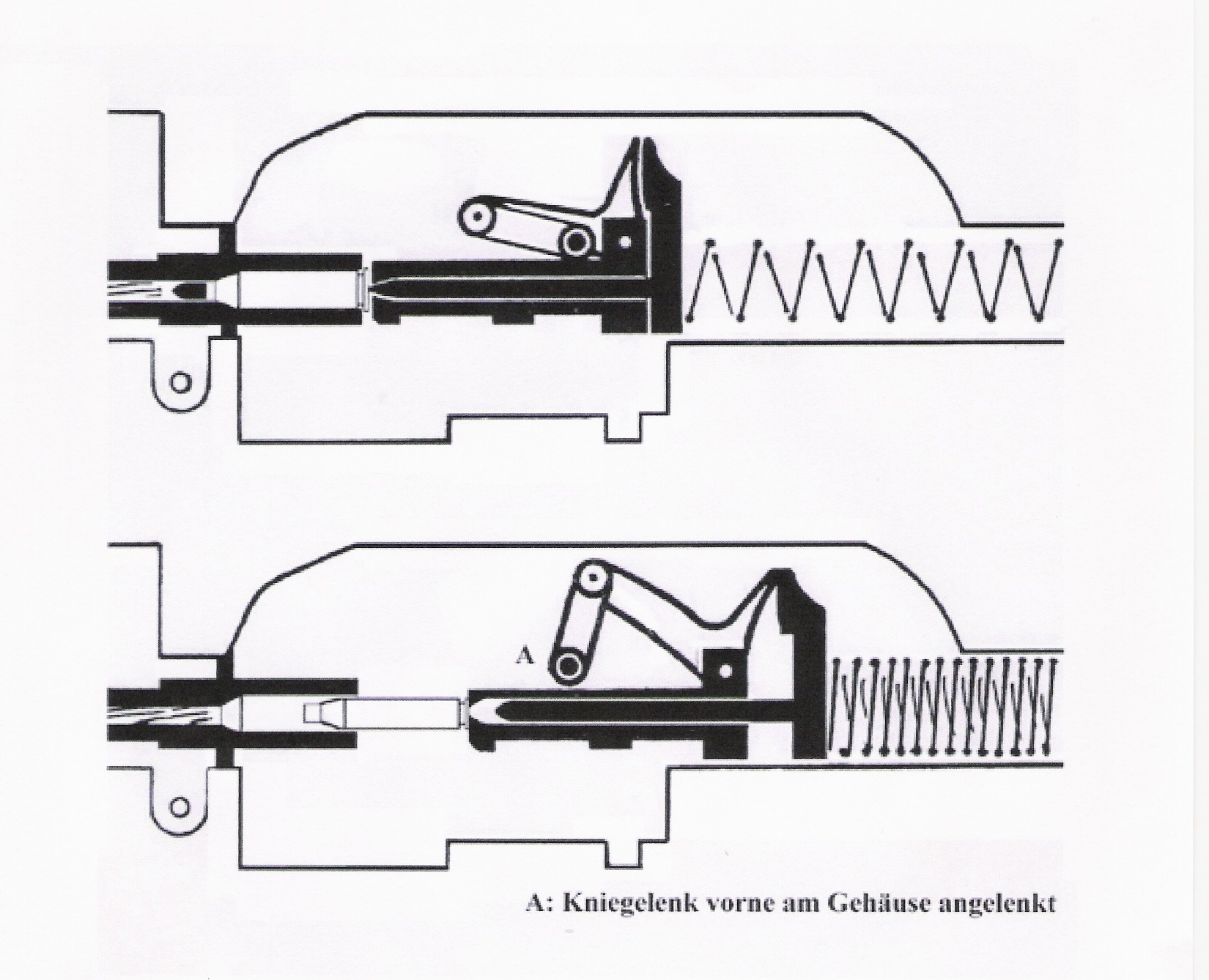
Operation of the Schwarzlose machine gun.

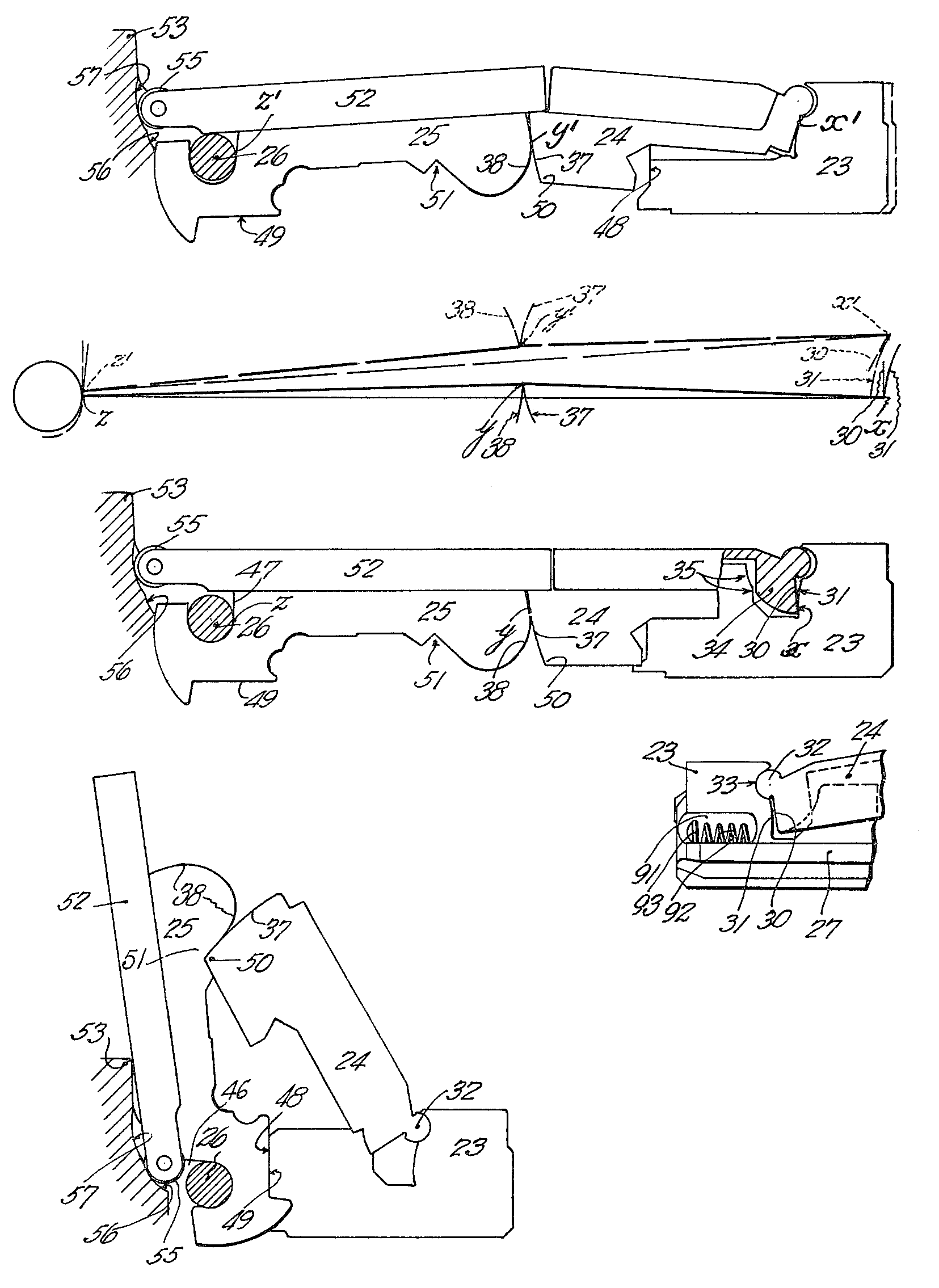
Image from Pedersen patent describing toggle-delayed blowback mechanism as used in his rifle

In toggle-delayed blowback firearms, the rearward motion of the breechblock must overcome significant mechanical leverage. The bolt is hinged in the middle, stationary at the rear end and nearly straight at rest. As the breech moves back under blowback power, the hinge joint moves upward. The leverage disadvantage keeps the breech from opening until the bullet has left the barrel and pressures have dropped to a safe level. This mechanism was used on the Pedersen rifle and Schwarzlose MG M.07/12 machine gun.

=== Off-axis bolt travel ===
John Browning developed this simple method whereby the axis of bolt movement was not in line with that of the bore probably during late WWI and patented it in 1921. The result was that a small rearward movement of the bolt in relation to the bore-axis required a greater movement along the axis of bolt movement, essentially magnifying the resistance of the bolt without increasing its mass. The French MAS-38 submachine gun of 1938 utilizes a bolt whose path of recoil is at an angle to the barrel. The Jatimatic and KRISS Vector use modified versions of this concept.

=== Radial-delayed ===
Radial-delayed blowback

CMMG introduced the MkG carbine incorporating a radial-delay in 2017. This system uses the rotation of the bolt head to accelerate the bolt carrier of an AR-15 pattern rifle. The bolt locking lugs are adapted to incorporate 120° angles that rotate the bolt as it travels rearward under conventional blowback power. As the bolt rotates 22.5˚, it must accelerate the bolt carrier to the rear through an adapted 50° angle cam-pin slot. This acceleration amplifies the effective mass of the bolt carrier, slowing the speed of the bolt head. This delay allows pressure to drop prior to extraction without the penalty of a heavier bolt carrier assembly. The system is similar to roller and lever-delayed blowback in that it uses the mass of the bolt carrier moving at a faster rate than the bolt head to delay the action from opening. The design is described in U.S. patent 10,436,530.

=== Screw/Turnbolt-delayed ===
First used on the Mannlicher Model 1893 automatic rifle, the bolt in screw-delayed blowback uses a turn bolt that was delayed by angled interrupted threads delayed by a quarter twist to unlock. John T. Thompson designed an autorifle that operated on a similar principle around 1920 and submitted it for trials with the US Army. This rifle, submitted multiple times, competed unsuccessfully against the Pedersen rifle and Garand primer-actuated rifle in early testing to replace the M1903 Springfield rifle. This operation is one of the most simple forms of delayed blowback but unless the ammunition is lubricated or uses a fluted chamber, the recoil can be volatile especially when using full length rifle rounds. Rotation of the bolt should be at least 90° to prevent ruptured cartridges. Another form of this operation using a helical screw to delay rearward movement was the Salvator-Dormus M1893 machine gun and later the prototype Kalashnikov Model 1942 submachine gun in 1942 and the Fox Wasp carbine.

=== Detent-delayed ===
Detent-delayed blowback uses a spring loaded detent installed inside the bolt (IE: a roll-pin) that locks itself into a notch on the end section of the guide rod closest to the barrel chamber rather than a section of the receiver/trunnion. Removing the detents from the bolt would turn the operation into a simple blowback operation. The Show Low Manufacturing Black-Jack pistol caliber carbine uses this operation.

== Other blowback systems ==
=== Floating chamber ===
David Marshall Williams (a noted designer for the U.S. Ordnance Office and later Winchester) developed a mechanism to allow firearms designed for full-sized cartridges to fire .22 caliber rimfire ammunition reliably. His system used a small "piston" that incorporates the chamber. When the cartridge is fired, the front of the floating chamber is thrust back by gas pressure impinging on the front of the chamber as in a traditional piston. This, added to the blowback energy imparted on the cartridge, pushes the bolt back with greater energy than either force alone. Often described as "accelerated blowback", this amplifies the otherwise anemic recoil energy of the .22 Rimfire cartridge. Williams designed a training version of the Browning machine gun and the Colt Service Ace .22 long rifle version of the M1911 using his system. The increased recoil produced by the floating chamber made these training guns behave more like their full-power counterparts while still using inexpensive low-power ammunition. The floating chamber is both a blowback and gas operated mechanism.

=== Primer actuated ===
Primer actuated blowback (schematic shows example using locking flaps)

Primer actuated firearms use the energy of primer setback to unlock and cycle the firearm. John Garand developed the system in an unsuccessful bid to replace the M1903 bolt-action rifle in the early 1920s. Garand's prototypes worked well with US military .30-06 ammunition and uncrimped primers, but then the military changed from a fast burning gunpowder to a progressive burning Improved Military Rifle (IMR) powder. The slower pressure rise made the primer actuated prototypes unreliable, so Garand abandoned the design for a gas operated rifle that became the M1 Garand. AAI Corporation used a primer piston in a rifle submitted for the SPIW competition. the Postnikov APT assault rifle and Clarke carbine as described in U.S. patent 2,401,616. And in some cases as in U.S. patent 2537443A the whole primer ejecting from the cartridge through a port in the bolt cocking the striker

A similar system is used in the spotting rifles on the LAW 80 and Shoulder-launched Multipurpose Assault Weapon use a 9mm, .308 Winchester based cartridge with a .22 Hornet blank cartridge in place of the primer. Upon firing, the Hornet case sets back a short distance, unlocking the action.

=== Case setback ===
The case cartridge itself has been used experimentally to actuate the action similar to Garand's primer-actuation. Known prototypes using this method of operation include two 1936 rifle designs, one by Mihail Mamontov and another by Makar Goryainov at TsKB-14, and a 1980s design by A.F. Barishev. The Mamontov and Goryainov rifles are only partially automatic; only the bolt unlocking is powered by the gases pushing the cartridge back, while the rest of the cycle (ejection, reloading) is done manually as in a traditional bolt-action rifle. A major problem with using the case cartridge as piston is that its motion is much faster (about 1 ms) compared to tapping gas further down the bore through a piston—about 5 ms in the Dragunov sniper rifle, which used the same cartridge as Mamontov's rifle. Barishev made a fully automatic, but rather bulky mechanism that used a mechanical delay. In his system, the case cartridge pushed back a tilting bolt face, that upon reaching a certain angle pushes backwards an unlocking lever that continues further before unlocking the bolt. The GRAU however still gave a negative evaluation of Barishev's gun, pointing out that the main problems with reliability of firearms using the cartridge case as a piston were known since the 1930s and still unsolved.

== Limited-utility designs ==
=== Blish lock ===
The Blish Lock is a breech locking mechanism designed by John Bell Blish based upon his observation that under extreme pressures, certain dissimilar metals will resist movement with a force greater than normal friction laws would predict. In modern engineering terminology, it is called static friction, or stiction. His locking mechanism was used in the Thompson submachine gun, Autorifle and Autocarbine designs. This dubious principle was later eliminated as redundant in the M1 and M1A1 versions of the submachine guns at the insistence of the US Army. Lubrication or fouling would completely defeat any delay. Whatever actual advantage a clean, unlubricated Blish system could impart could also be attained by adding a mere ounce of mass to the bolt.

=== Savage rotating barrel ===
The Savage system employed the theory that the rifling in the barrel caused a rotational force that would hold the gun locked until the projectile left the barrel. It was later discovered that the bullet had left the barrel long before any locking could occur. Savage pistols were in fact operating as simple blow back firearms. The French MAB PA-15 and PA-8 9mm pistols feature a similar design and work correctly.

=== Headspace actuated unlocking ===
Headspace actuated unlocking.

An unusual operation that uses a bolt head that moves rearwards when firing that allows the cartridge to move backwards or even stretching it until the bolt unlocks. When firing the cartridge moves the bolt head rearwards around 2.5mm until it stops, then rotates the bolt to unlock and cycle the operation.

=== Magnet delay ===
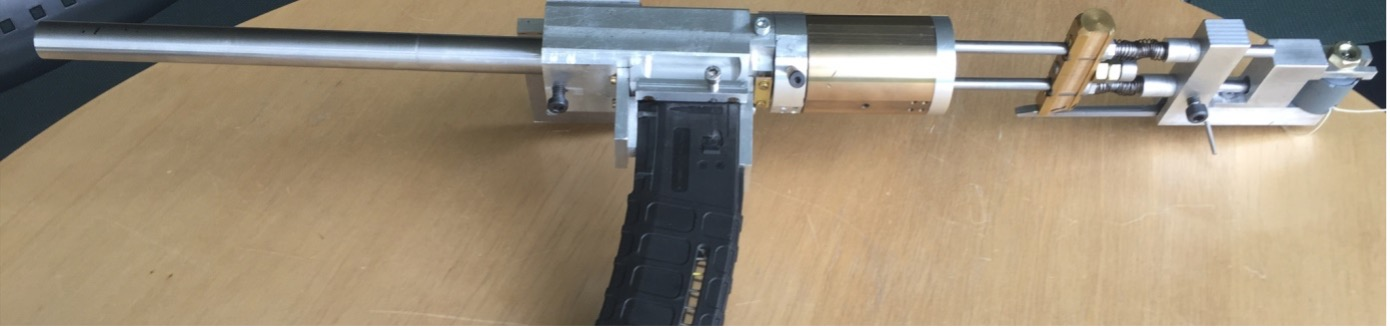
Magnet delayed blowback (testbed shown)

An operation using a "simple blowback" type bolt that has neodymium magnets to delay its operation. A special buffer using this operation has been developed by TACCOM.

=== Pneumatic delay ===
Pneumatic/Hydraulic delay.

Pneumatic/hydraulic delay is where using a "simple blowback" type bolt with the air pressure delaying the operation. The Suomi KP/-31 and the Moore submachine gun is an example that uses this operation.

== Other autoloading systems ==
Other autoloading systems are:

- Blow forward, which is similar to blowback, but with the whole barrel being pushed forward rather than the bolt pushed back.
- Recoil operation uses the rearward movement of parts of the weapon counter to the ejecta (bullet and propellant) moving forward, as described by Newton's third law of motion.
- Gas-operated reloading

== See also ==
- List of blow forward firearms
- List of delayed-blowback firearms
- List of API blowback firearms

== Bibliography ==
- Bremner, Derek. The MG42V and the Origins of Delayed Blowback Roller Lock: WWII German Equipment. ISBN 0-9533792-0-5.
- Chinn, George M. (1955). The Machine Gun, Volume IV: Design Analysis of Automatic Firing Mechanisms and Related Components. Washington, D.C.: Bureau of Ordnance, Department of the Navy.
- Hatcher, Julian (1957). Hatcher's Notebook: A Standard Reference Book for Shooters, Gunsmiths, Ballisticians, Historians, Hunters, and Collectors (2nd ed.). Harrisburg: Stackpole. OCLC 2397069.
