= Ludwig Vorgrimler =

German firearms engineer (1912–1983)

- Born: Ludwig Vorgrimler; 7 September 1912; Freiburg, German Empire
- Died: 10 January 1983 (aged 70)
- Occupations: Inventor, engineer

Ludwig Vorgrimler (7 September 1912 – 23 February 1983) was a weapons designer, best known for designing the Spanish roller-delayed CETME rifle, and its prolific offspring from the German gunmaker Heckler & Koch such as the G3, HK21, P9 and MP5.

== Early career with Mauser ==
Born in Freiburg, Germany, Vorgrimler worked as an engineer for several arms manufacturers over his long career. He briefly worked for the Krupp factory from January to November 1936. From there, he was recruited by Ott-Helmuth von Lossnitzer, the director of Mauser Werke's Weapons Research Institute and Weapons Development Group. He was assigned to Department 37, which was responsible for military small arms up to 15 mm in caliber and eventually led the sub-department in charge of aircraft weapon construction.

During the Second World War the roller-delayed blowback firearm action was patented by Vorgrimler together with Wilhelm Stähle but the work was not entirely completed by the end of the war. Though appearing simple its development during World War II was a hard technical and personal effort, as German engineering, mathematical and other scientists had to work together on a like-it-or-not basis led by von Lossnitzer. Experiments showed roller-delayed blowback firearms exhibited bolt-bounce as the bolt opened at an extreme velocity of approximately 20 m/s (66 ft/s) during automatic fire. To counter bolt-bounce the perfect angle choice on the nose of the bolt head had to be found to significantly reduce the opening velocity of the bolt. The extremely high bolt carrier velocities problem was not solved by trial and error but mathematician Karl Maier finally provided a numerical analysis of the components and assemblies in the development project.

By January 1944, Vorgrimler was ordered to design a heavy machinegun using the roller-delayed blowback operating system then under development for military rifles. In response, Vorgrimler attempted to convert the gas-operated roller-locked MG215 to the roller-delayed system. He would later claim that he participated in the development of the MG 45, a conversion of the roller-locked MG 42 to roller-delayed operation.

Vorgrimler remained with Mauser until August 1945.

== After World War II ==
After the war ended, Mauser's Department 37 development group was placed under control of the French War Department's armament group, Direction des Etudes et Fabrication d'Armament (DEFA). The Mauser factory was renamed the DEFA Development Center, Oberndorf. The French continued work there through 1946, when workers and equipment began to be transferred to the Mulhouse area of Alsace. This became the Centre d'Etudes et d'Armament de Mulhouse (CEAM). The transfer of operations to Mulhouse was complete by March 1948. In February 1948, Vorgrimler and fellow Mauser engineer Theodor Löffler were assigned the development of roller-delayed carbines for the French. They worked separately on carbines for the experimental 7.65×35mm cartridge, developed by Cartoucherie de Valence. Their carbines were patterned upon the prototype StG45, which had been under development at Mauser prior to the end of the war. The French ultimately abandoned their 7.65×35mm cartridge in favor of the US .30 Carbine cartridge. Vorgrimler and Löffler then went to work on roller delayed carbines for the latter cartridge. Ultimately, Löffler's designs won out. Vorgrimler then devoted his efforts to improving Löffler's designs. Eventually, Vorgrimler tired of this and left CEAM at the end of June, 1950.

Vorgrimler was recruited to work for CETME in Spain. The French initially attempted to prevent him from leaving the country, but Vorgrimler and family were allowed to move to Madrid in September 1950. Once there, Vorgrimler went to work on a roller-delayed rifle chambered for the experimental 7.92×40mm cartridge. Former Rheinmetall engineers led by Hartmut Menneking already had a nine-month head start on the gas-operated Modelo 1, but Vorgrimler and his team of former Mauser engineers had their own Modelo 2 prototype ready by December 1950. The Spanish government selected the Modelo 2 for continued development in July, 1952.

== CETME Modelo B ==
Beside the interest at home in Spain, the Modelo 2 attracted a lot of attention from the West German Border Guards (Bundesgrenzschutz), which sought a new service rifle. Not willing to accept a cartridge outside of the NATO specification, the Germans asked CETME to develop a 7.62 mm version of the rifle. Misunderstanding the German request, CETME developed a 7.62 mm version of the 7.92×40mm cartridge. The Germans then had to explain that they wanted a version chambered for the standard 7.62×51mm NATO. Instead, the resulting CETME Modelo A was chambered for the 7.62×51mm CETME cartridge, which had identical chamber dimensions but a reduced-power load compared to the standard NATO round. Further development of the rifle produced the CETME Modelo B, which had been "improved" with the help of Heckler & Koch, receiving several modifications including the ability to fire from a closed bolt in both semi-automatic and automatic firing modes, a new perforated sheet-metal handguard (the folding bipod had been the foregrip in previous models), improved ergonomics, and a slightly longer barrel with a rifle grenade launcher mount. In 1958, this rifle was introduced into service with the Spanish Army as the Modelo 58. For his efforts in developing the rifle, Vorgrimler was awarded the Encomienda de Alfonso X el Sabio.

In 1956, the Bundesgrenzschutz canceled its planned procurement of the CETME rifles, adopting the FN FAL (G1) instead. However, the newly formed West German Army (Bundeswehr) now displayed interest and soon purchased a number of CETME rifles for further testing. The CETME, known as the Automatisches Gewehr G3, competed successfully against the SIG SG 510 (G2) and AR-10 (G4) to replace the previously favored G1 rifle. In January 1959, the Bundeswehr officially adopted the CETME rifle. The CETME design was licensed by the West German government, and production was transferred to German manufacturers, Heckler & Koch and Rheinmetall. Heckler & Koch would go on to develop an entire family of weapons based on the G3, including the HK33 rifle, HK21 machine gun, and MP5 submachine gun.

== Later years ==
In the summer of 1956, Vorgrimler moved back to West Germany. Despite the recruiting efforts of Heckler & Koch engineering director (and former Mauser Department 37 colleague) Alex Seidel, Vorgrimler returned to work at Mauser as the head of research and development. By then, Mauser and CETME had entered a working alliance. Soon after, Vorgrimler developed a companion machinegun based on the CETME rifle design. While commercially unsuccessful, it inspired Heckler & Koch's HK21 introduced years later.

Vorgrimler continued to be granted patents for his work throughout the 1960s and 1970s. This included work on commercial sporting rifles, caseless infantry rifles, and an automatic cannon with Mauser and Industriewerke Karlsruhe.
