= Hełm wz. 67 =

Polish People's Army combat helmet

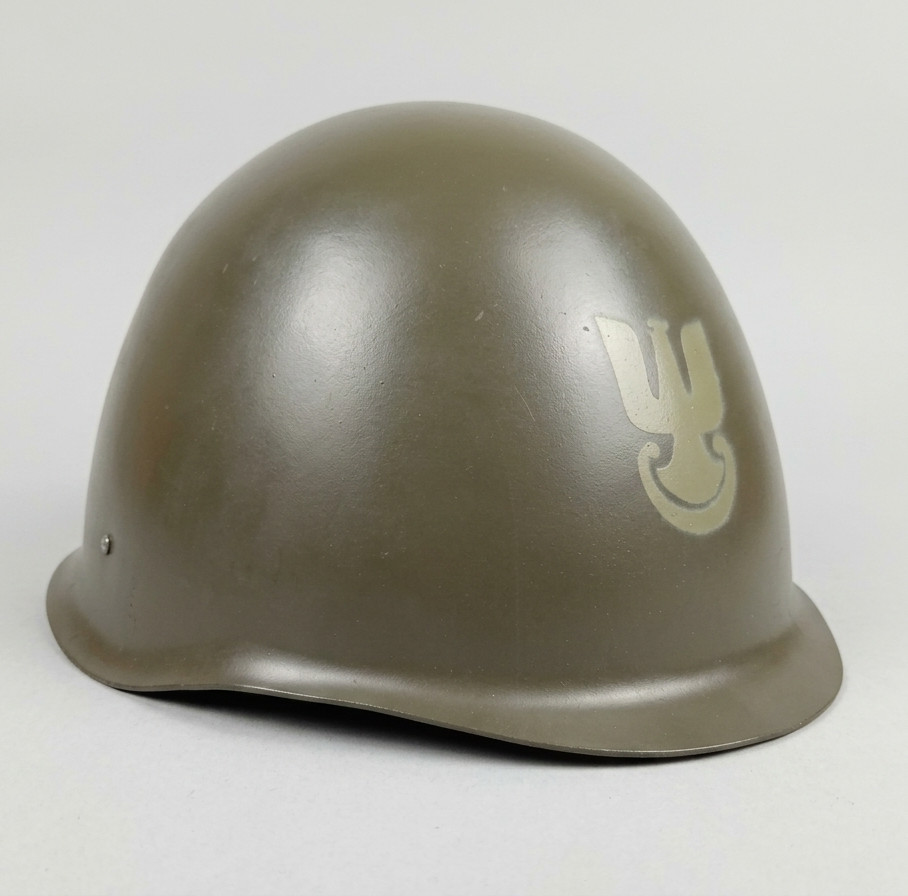
- Type: Combat helmet
- Place of origin: Polish People's Republic

Service history
- In service: 1967-present
- Used by: See Users for details
- Wars: Warsaw Pact invasion of Czechoslovakia; Martial law in Poland; Gulf War; War in Afghanistan (2001–2021); Syrian civil war Russo-Ukrainian War

Production history
- Designer: Military Institute of Armament Technology
- Manufacturer: Huta Silesia
- Produced: 1967-1989
- Variants: wz. 67; wz. 67/75

Specifications
- Weight: 1,5kg (3,35 lbs)

The Hełm wz. 67 is a combat helmet designed in the 1960s. Originally intended for the Polish People's Army, it was also exported to other countries. Despite many attempts to replace it with the wz. 93 or wz. 2000 helmets, it remains in use for rear-line units and training.

== History ==
Working on a new steel helmet to replace the previously used wz. 50, started at the Military Institute of Armament Technology in 1964. The construction team was led by Colonel M. Eng. Romuald Zimny. Hełm wz. 67 was officially adopted on April 21, 1967, and was produced at Huta Silesia until the end of the 1980s.

== Design ==
=== Shell ===
The shape of the helmet refers to the pre-war model helmet wz. 31. The shell is pressed from a special steel sheet with a thickness of 1.4 mm. It has a slightly marked peak and a tiny brim. The weight of the helmet is approximately 1.5 kg.

The shells of wz. 67 helmet are made in two sizes:

- small (adapted to the installation of suspensions in sizes: 54–57 cm)
- large (adapted to the installation of suspensions in sizes: 58–60 cm)

=== Liner ===
In hełm wz. 67 there are three types of internal equipment. The first type is the suspension used in wz. 50 helmets. The second one (the most common) is mounted on a supporting element in the form of a metal ring. A leather belt is attached to it, cut into eight elongated leaves. Each of them was sewn together at the end, creating a tunnel. A shoelace is threaded through the tunnels, thus creating a kind of hat. The suspension is attached to the shell with one screw located at the top of the helmet. This procedure significantly facilitates the replacement of the damaged liner, as well as its quick disassembly, which allows you to wear the helmet directly on the fur hat in winter. The chin strap, made of leather, is attached directly to the shell. It is fastened with a metal buckle.

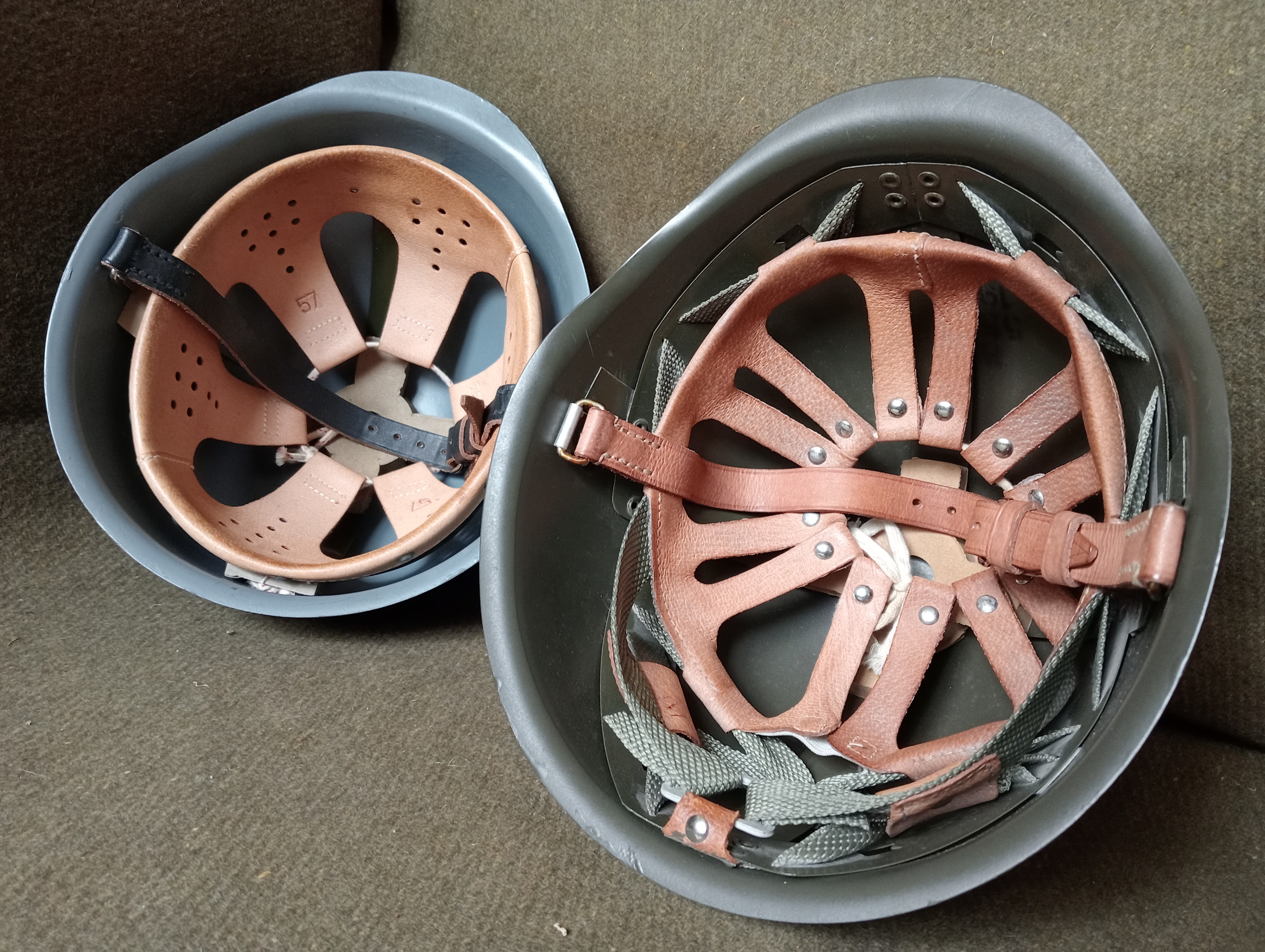
The interior of a wz. 67 helmet (left) and wz. 67/75 helmet (right).

The third type of internal equipment was introduced in 1977. The new facade consists of a metal frame, a complex system of straps and a leather "hammock". The hammock can be adjusted to suit any head size. The new fit allows the helmet to be held firmly on the back of the head, preventing it from sliding onto the face, for example when crawling. Helmets with such equipment are marked as wz. 67/75.

== Painting ==
Initially, it was planned to paint the helmets with "Salamandra" anti-reflective varnish, similarly to the wz. 31, however, this idea was abandoned. The standard ones were painted with a smooth semi-matt varnish in two colors: green (for land forces) and blue-gray (for air forces, Home Air Defense Forces and Navy). The eagle symbol of the Land Forces or Air Force was painted on the helmets (or applied in the form of decals). An appropriate mark was placed on helmets intended for WSW. Helmets intended for the Milicja Obywatelska had large letters "M" and "O" painted on the front and a large state eagle between them.

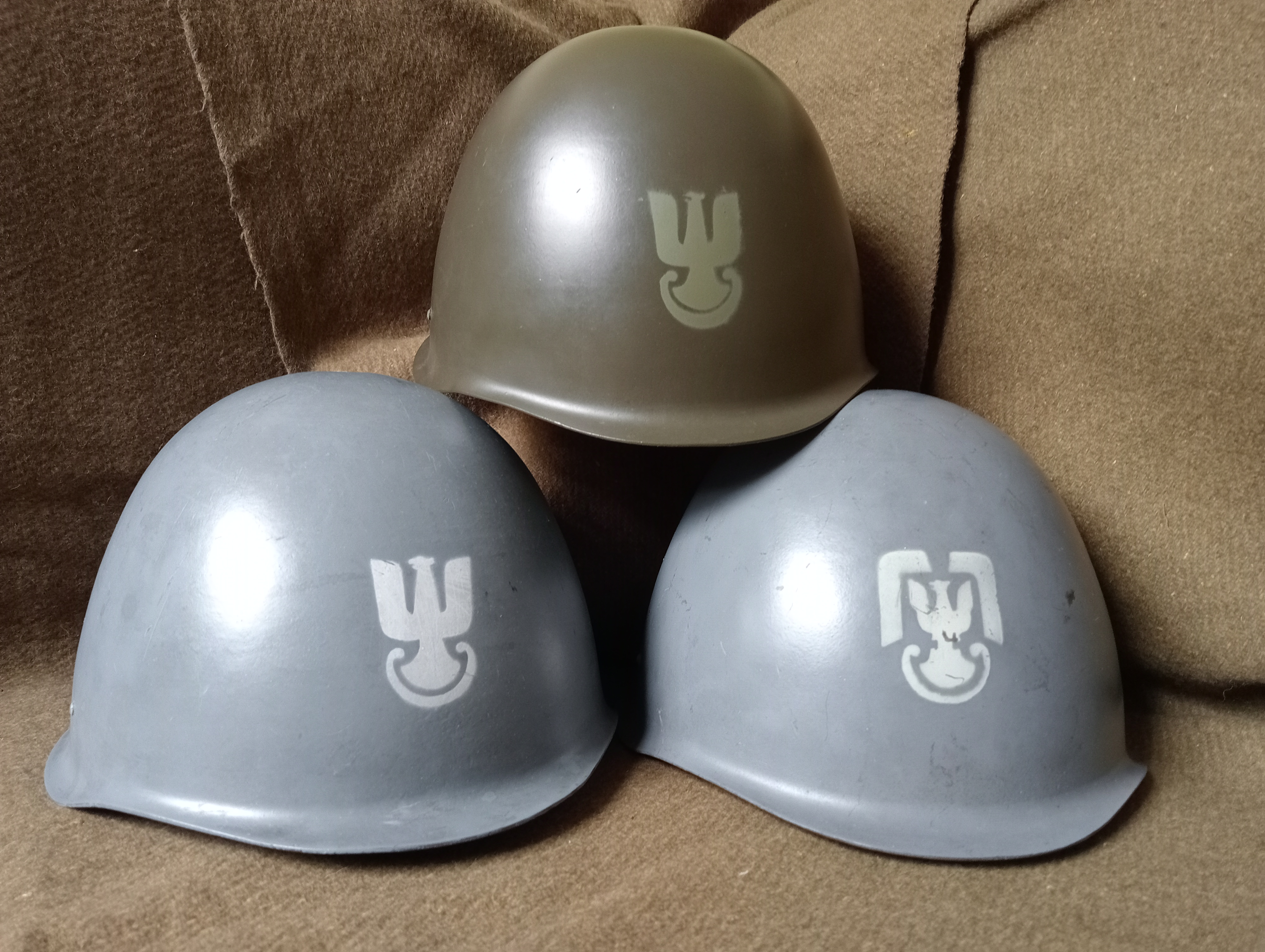
The wz. 67 helmets in the following colours (from top, from left): Land Forces, Navy and Air Force.

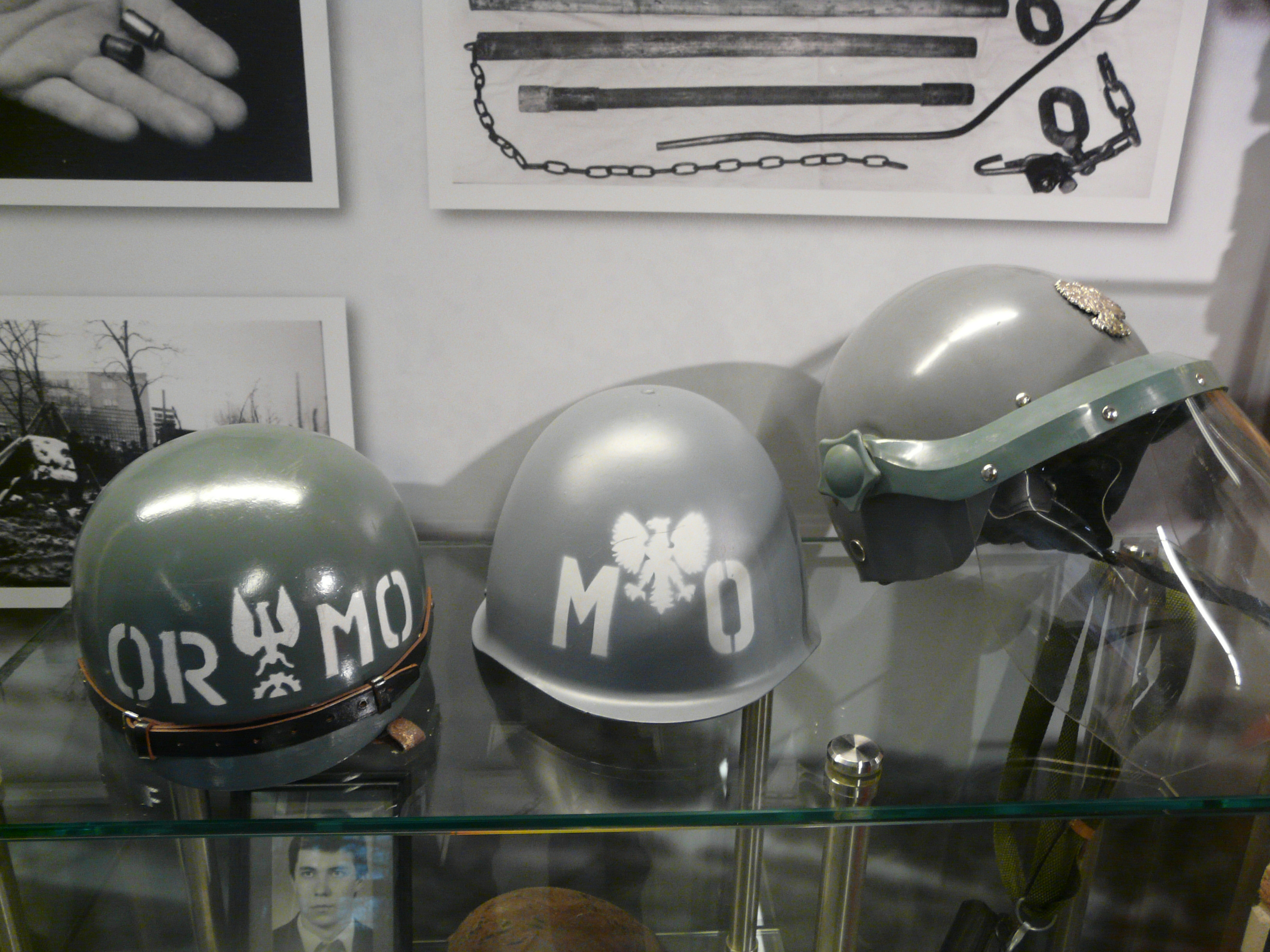
The wz. 67 helmet (mid) in painting for Milicja Obywatelska.

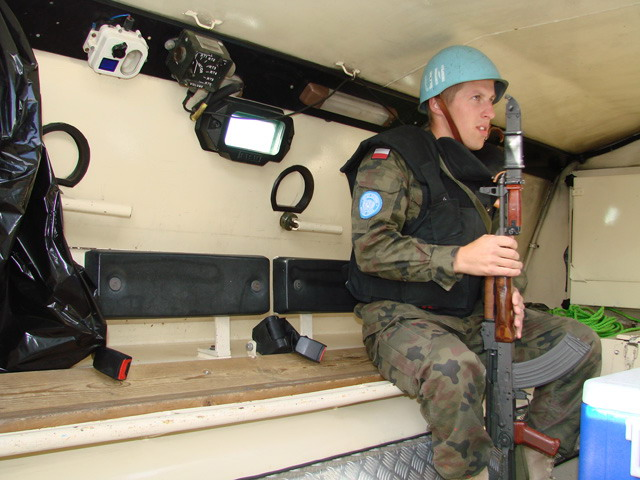
Wz. 67 helmet in painting for United Nations forces.

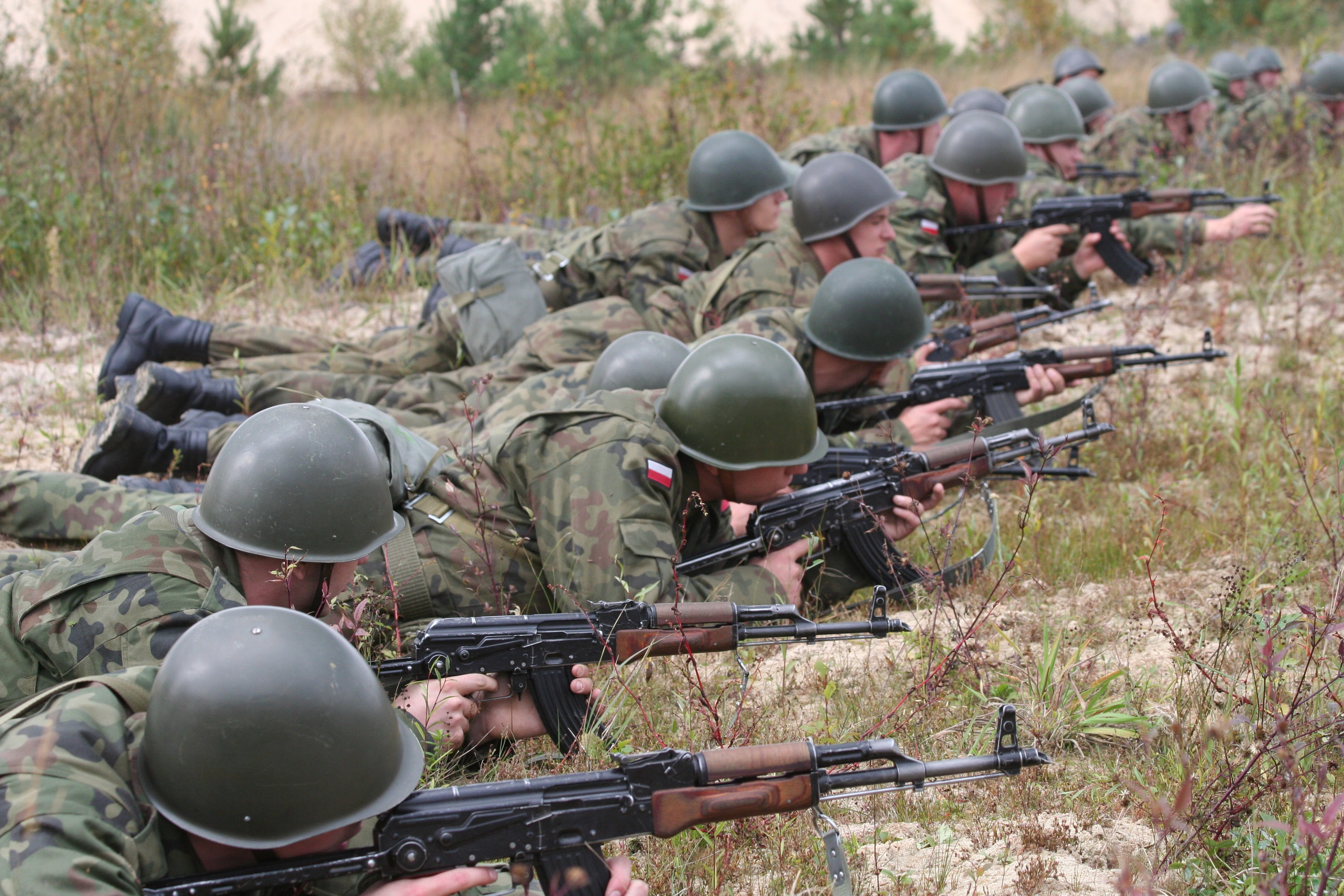
Polish soldiers in wz. 67 helmets, 2008.

== Accessories ==
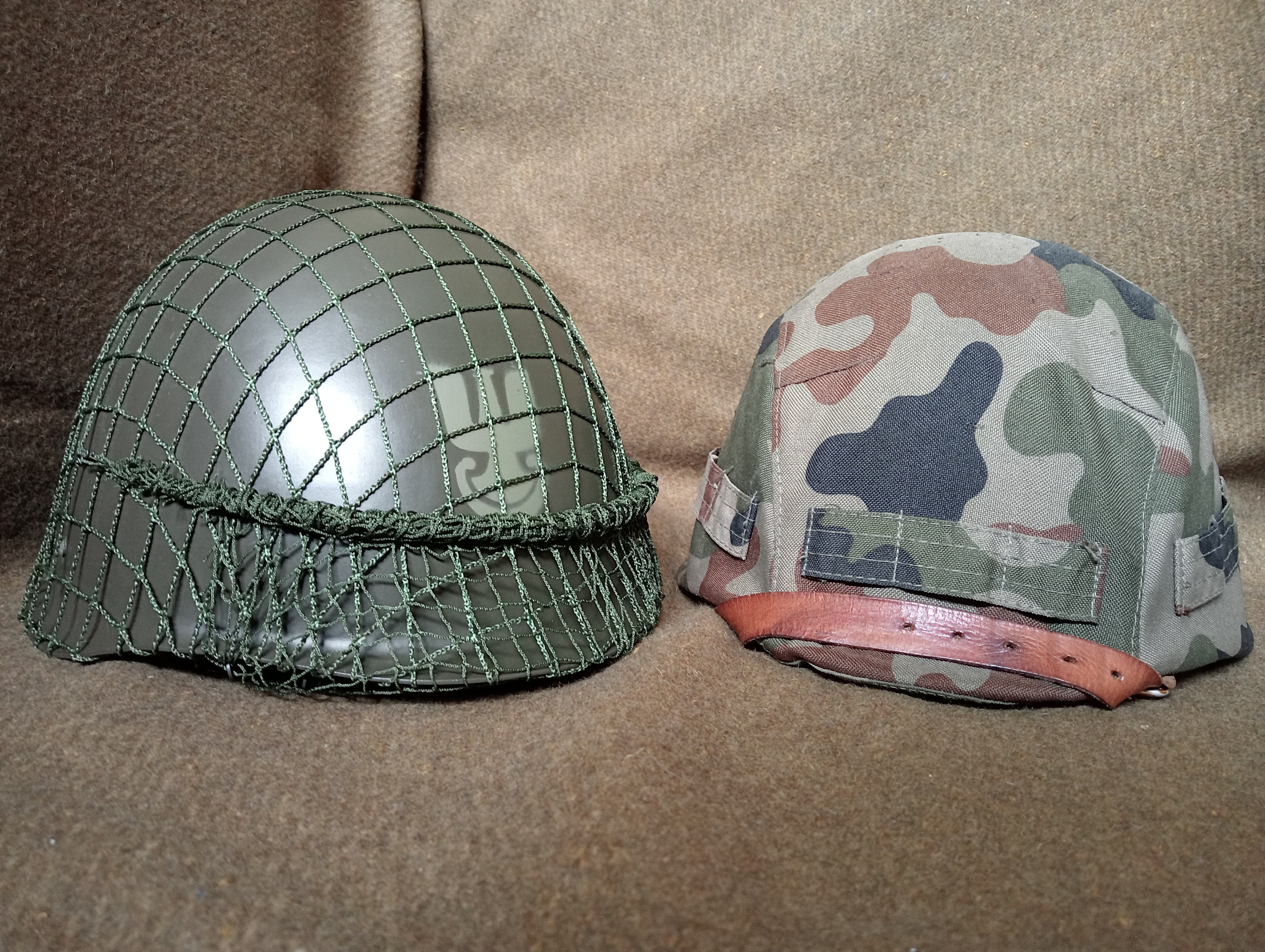
Example of camouflage of wz. 67 helmets: camouflage net and camouflage cover in wz. 93 Pantera camouflage.

For camouflaging purposes, helmets wz. 67 and wz. 67/75 are equipped with a masking net and a special face veil. In helmets for land forces, the mesh and veil were khaki, and in blue-gray helmets - in a similar color. In winter, white covers were used. Currently, the camouflage nets have been replaced by camouflage covers in wz. 93 Pantera camo.

== Users ==
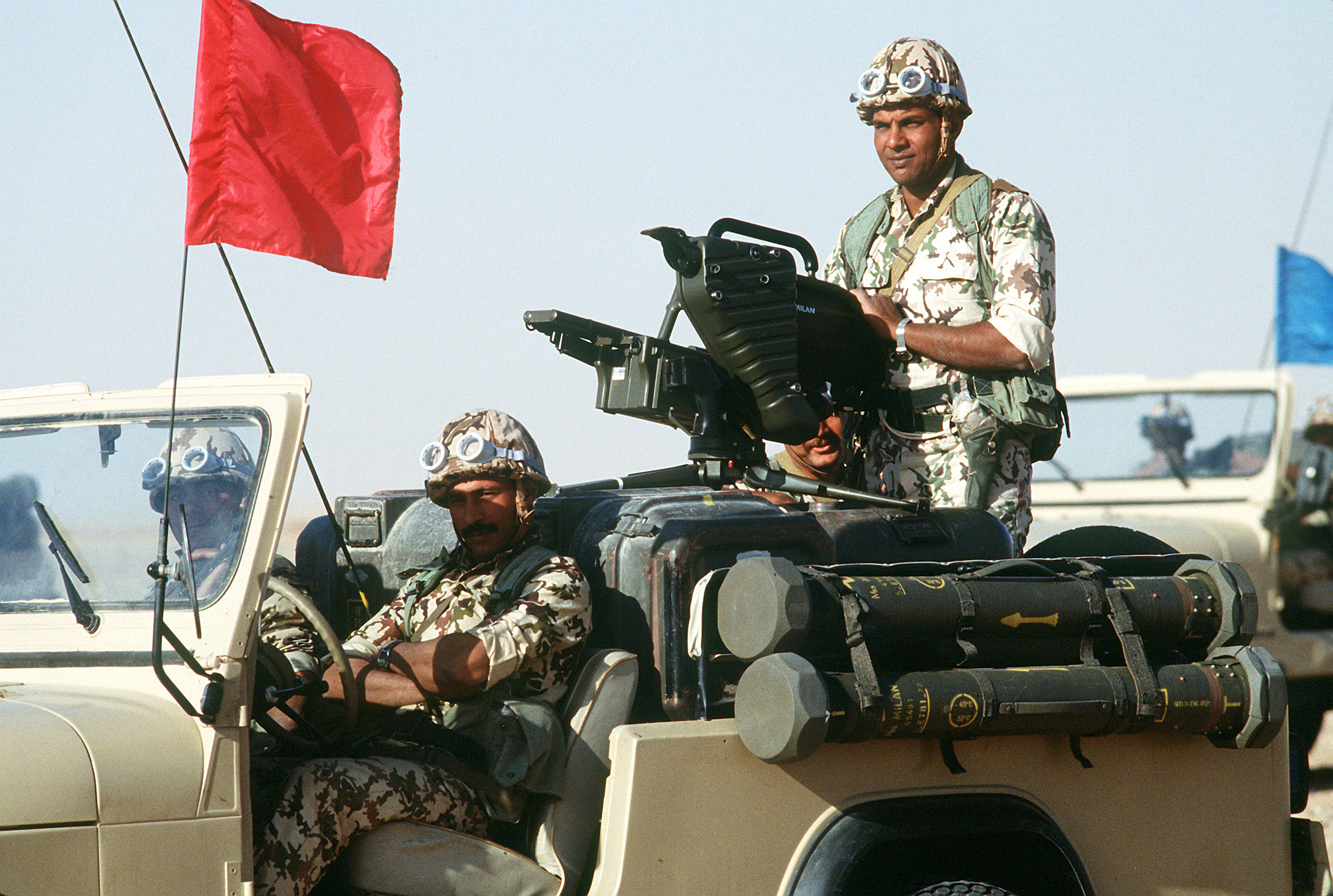
Egyptian soldiers wearing wz. 67 helmets, 1992

Current

- Donetsk People's Republic
- Egypt: wz. 67 and wz. 67/75 helmets were exported to Egypt in the 1970s and 1980s.They remain in use by the Egyptian Armed Forces and police.
- Poland: still in limited use as a training helmet in Polish Armed Forces and police.
- Syria
- Ukraine: used sporadically in auxiliary formations during the Russian invasion of Ukraine.

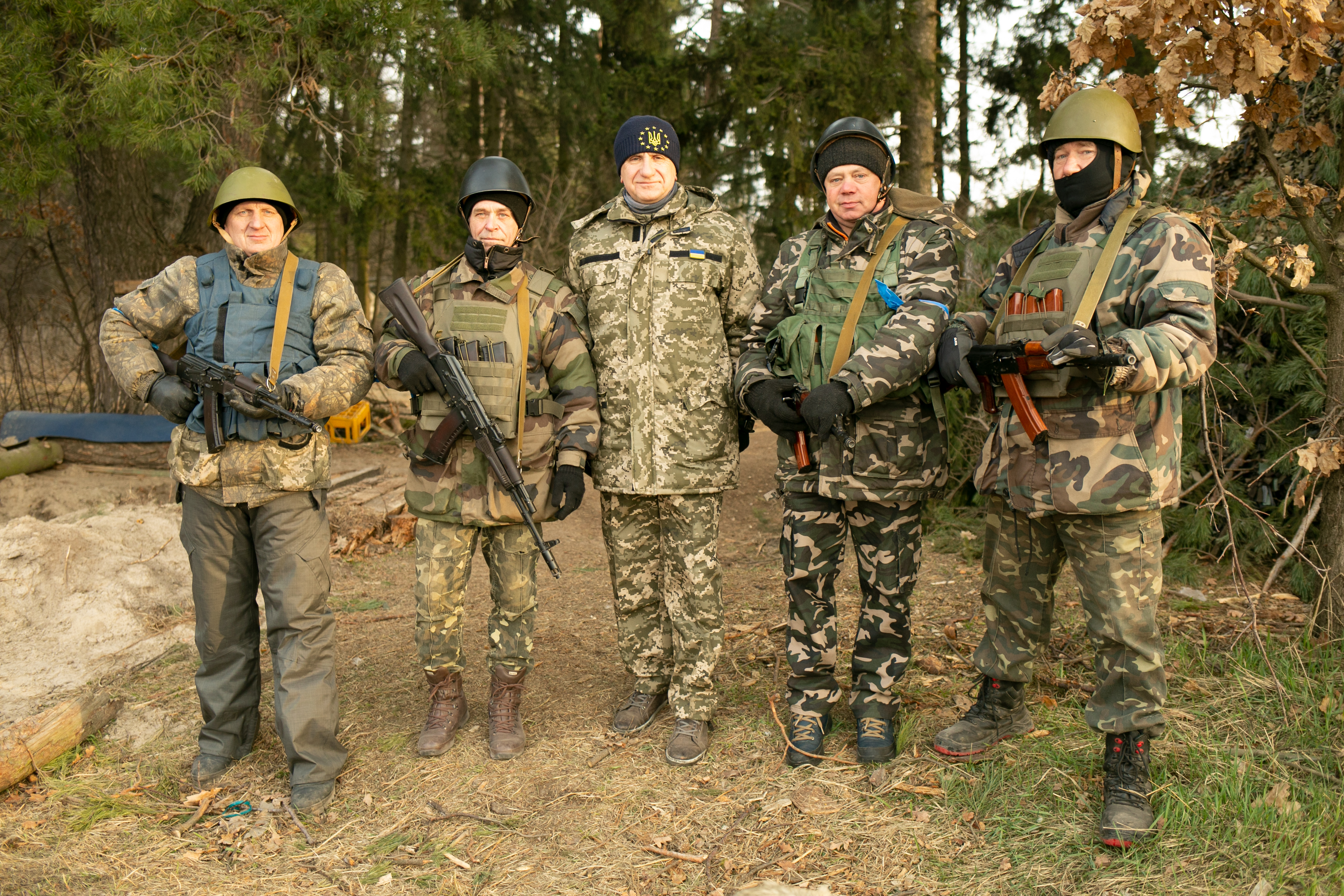
Soldiers of Territorial Defense Forces of Ukraine in 2022, with wz. 67 helmets (painted on black color).

Former

- Islamic Republic of Afghanistan: there are known examples of the use of wz. 67 helmets by the Afghan National Army.
- Polish People's Republic: the wz. 67 and wz. 67/75 was used as the primary infantry helmet of the Polish People's Army from 1967 until 1989. Also used by the Militia and Border Protection Forces.

Non-state actors

- al-Qaeda
- Free Syrian Army
