= List of equipment of the Armenian Armed Forces =

Equipment of the Armenian Armed Forces
- Founded: January 28, 1992

The modern equipment of the Armenian Armed Forces is listed in this page.

== Personnel equipment ==
=== Uniforms ===
Name	Photo	Origin	Notes
ARMPAT		Armenia	Main camouflage pattern of the Armenian Armed Forces. Being replaced by Multicam.
KLMK		Soviet Union	Used by border guards.
Flora		Russia	Digital EMR Flora and Woodland Flora used by different divisions in the army.
Multicam		Armenia	To be used by the Armenian Army in 2024. Used by the military special units and law enforcement. Civilian versions used by volunteer fighters in the 2020 Nagorno-Karabakh war.
A-TACS "Ataka"		United States	Used by Armenian special forces and snipers.
Tropentarn		Germany	Used by peacekeepers in Afghanistan and Iraq who are part of the German contingent.
Vegetato		Italy	Used by Armenian special units.
Lizard		Greece	Used formerly by Armenian Peacekeepers.
U.S. Woodland		United States	Formerly used by the Armenian Army and the Artsakh Army.
DCU		United States	Used in training drills. Formerly used by Armenian peacekeepers in Iraq.

=== Individual equipment ===
Name	Type	Origin	Photo	Notes
Helmets
Hełm wz. 93	Combat helmet	Poland		Secondary-use helmet.
SSh-68	Combat Helmet	Soviet Union		Used by reservists, volunteers and for training purposes.
PASGT Helmet	Combat helmet	United States		New Standard Helmet, used widely since 2023.
FAST Helmet	Combat helmet	United States		Mostly used by special forces. Few used by reconnaissance, scout, and infantry divisions. Seen in 2021 Armenian Armed Forces exercises.
Armored vests
Armocom Vests	Bulletproof vest	Armenia		"SK" variant vests made by the Armocom company.
MG-47	Bulletproof vest	Armenia		New widely seen "MG-47" variant vests made by Armor Arm.
CIRAS	Bulletproof vest	United States		Limited use.
SMPP	Bulletproof vest	India		
Tactical communications
COMTAC	Headset	United States		Protective communication headsets.
Other Equipment
MILES	Military laser	United States		Used in trainings, being seen used since 2021
PSO-1	Telescopic sight	Soviet Union		
EOTech	Holographic sight	United States		Used by Armenian Special Forces
M4 Aimpoint	Red dot sight	United States		Used by Armenian Special Forces, seen in exercises.
JIM Compact	Multifunctional optronic device	France		The multifunctional Jim Compact infrared binoculars were purchased from Safran in 2023 and delivered in early 2024. The STERNA Joint Fires Support System has also been purchased to work in tandem with the binoculars.
Tonbo Spartan-S	Thermal weapon sight	India		Seen first during 2024 "Eagle Partner" exercise.

== Small arms ==
=== Small arms ===
Name	Photo	Origin	Cartridge	Notes
Handguns
TT-33 Tokarev		Soviet Union	7.62×25mm Tokarev	
PSM		Soviet Union	5.45×18mm	Used in small numbers.
Makarov PM		Soviet Union	9×18mm Makarov	Main service pistol.
Shotguns
Carbines and spec arms
VSS Vintorez		Soviet Union	9×39mm	Used by special units.
AKS-74U		Soviet Union	5.45×39mm	Used by special units.
Assault rifles
AKM		Soviet Union	7.62×39mm	
AK-74		Soviet Union	5.45×39mm	Main assault rifle under replacement.
AK-103		Armenia; Russia	7.62×39mm	Main assault rifle. Replacing the AK-74 as main assault rifle, produced under license.
AK-105		Russia	5.45×39mm	
AK-12		Armenia; Russia	5.45×39mm	Replacing the AK-74, produced under license.
AK-15		Armenia; Russia	7.62×39mm	Replacing the AK-74, produced under license.
Sniper rifles
SVD		Soviet Union	7.62×54mmR	Used by snipers and special forces.
SV-98		Russia	.338 Lapua Magnum	Used by snipers and special forces.
Orsis T-5000		Russia	.338 Lapua Magnum	Probably used in small number.
Sako TRG		Finland	.338 Lapua Magnum	Used by the special forces of the army and the NSS Alpha Group.
PGM 338		France	.338 Lapua Magnum	Used by snipers and the special forces.
SSS Saber		India	.338 Lapua Magnum	Used by snipers and special forces.
Accuracy International AX-338		United Kingdom	.338 Lapua Magnum	Used by snipers and special forces.
Victrix Scorpio		Italy	.338 Lapua Magnum	Seen in recent Special Forces exercise in March. Used with NightForce Optics and SIGNUM suppressors made by Victrix.
Zastava M93 Black Arrow		Serbia	12.7×108mm	Standard service anti-material rifle.
Desert Tech HTI		United States	.50 BMG	Anti-material rifle used by snipers and special forces.
Machine guns
RPK-74		Soviet Union	5.45×39mm	
RPK-74M		Russia	5.45×39mm	
PK		Soviet Union	7.62×54mmR	Standard issue general-purpose machine gun.
DShK		Soviet Union	12.7×108mm	
NSV		Soviet Union	12.7×108mm	
OFB 7.62X51mm Belt Fed		India	7.62x51mm	Shown during meeting with Indian military chief.
Browning M2		Belgium	.50 BMG	Shown during Military Parade preparation. Produced in Belgium.
Grenade launchers
AGS-17		Serbia; Soviet Union	30mm grenade	100 launchers purchased from Serbia.
GP-30		Russia	40mm grenade	Underslug grenade launcher.
RG-6		Russia	40mm grenade	
RPO-A Shmel		Soviet Union	93mm (man-portable thermobaric weapon)	

=== Mortars ===
Name	Origin	Type	Photo	Notes
Mortars
M57	Yugoslavia	60mm		
M69	Yugoslavia	82mm		
2B9 Vasilek	Soviet Union	82mm		
Hrazdan	Armenia	82mm		Transported on Tata Xenon. New Armenian made mortar Made by Arsenal Armtech.
Sevan	Armenia	120mm		Armenian made mortar with firing range of 7100m. Seen in military trainings. Made by Arsenal Armtech.
M74	Yugoslavia	120mm		The M75 variant is also used.
M120 mortar	United States	120mm		
Hell cannon	Armenia	?		Improvised mortar used in the Second Nagorno-Karabakh War.

=== Man-portable air-defense systems (MANPADS) ===
Name	Origin	Photo	Notes
9K310 Igla-1	Soviet Union		NATO codename SA-16 Gimlet.
9K38 Igla	Soviet Union		NATO codename SA-18 Grouse.
9K338 Igla-S	Russia		NATO codename SA-24 Grinch.
9K333 Verba	Russia		NATO codename SA-25 Gizmo.
Possible future procurements
Mistral 3	France		Letter of intent signed in October 2023.

=== Anti-tank weapons ===
Name	Origin	Type	Photo	Notes
anti-tank grenade launchers
RPG-7		Armenia; Soviet Union	Rocket-propelled grenade	
RPG-7A		Armenia	Rocket-propelled grenade	Arsenal Armtech made RPG with penetration of 300-600mm and a firing range of 300-500m.
anti-tank guided missile (ATGM) launchers
9K111 Fagot		Soviet Union	Anti-tank guided missile	NATO codename: AT-4 Spigot.
9M113 Konkurs		Soviet Union	Anti-tank guided missile	NATO codename: AT-5 Spandrel. An unknown number of Konkurs-M missiles were reportedly purchased from India.
9K115 Metis		Soviet Union	Anti-tank guided missile	NATO codename: AT-7 Saxhorn. Seen in use for training reservists.
9M133 Kornet		Russia	Anti-tank guided missile	NATO codename: AT-14 Spriggan. Kornet-E version.
GAM-102 LR		China	Anti-tank guided missile	Transported on Tata Xenon. Seen during Parade in 2026. 10km Range with 1000mm armor penetration and a top-attack trajectory. Operating under local name "Nizak".
anti-tank gun
SPG-9		Soviet Union	Recoilless rifle	
MT-12 "Rapira"		Russia	Anti-tank gun	100mm
tank destroyers
9P149 Shturm-S		Soviet Union	Tank destroyer	NATO codename: AT-6 Spiral.
9P148		Soviet Union	Tank destroyer	Upgraded with thermal sights.

== Vehicles ==
Available estimates should be treated with caution following losses suffered in the fighting since late 2020 in Nagorno-Karabakh.

=== Combat vehicles ===
Name	Photo	Origin	Type	Number	Notes
Tanks
T-54/55		Soviet Union	Main battle tank	8	3 T-54 and 5 T-55 as of 2024.
T-72		Soviet Union; Russia	Main battle tank	100	T-72A and T-72B variants used.
T-90		Russia	Main battle tank	1	One T-90S won as a prize at the tank biathlon in 2014.
Armoured fighting vehicle
BMP-1		Soviet Union	Infantry fighting vehicle	100	
BMP-1K		Soviet Union	Infantry fighting vehicle	25	
BMP-2		Soviet Union	Infantry fighting vehicle	15	
BRM-1K		Soviet Union	Reconnaissance vehicle	12	
MT-LB		Soviet Union	Armoured personnel carrier	20	
BTR-60		Soviet Union	Armoured personnel carrier	108	
BTR-70		Soviet Union	Armoured personnel carrier	18	
BTR-80		Soviet Union	Armoured personnel carrier	4	
Light armored cars
ACMAT Bastion		France	Armoured personnel carrier	50	A total of 50 vehicles purchased in 2023.
Lusan		Armenia	Infantry mobility vehicle	15	15 Armenian licensed Buran, with NATO STANAG 2 Protection. In production for the Armenian Army since 2022.
GAZ Tigr		Russia	Infantry mobility vehicle	Unknown	

=== Transport vehicles ===
Name	Origin	Type	Number	Photo	Notes
Trucks
GAZ-66	Soviet Union	Cargo truck	Unknown		Being replaced with Russian KAMAZ and Ural trucks.
GAZ-3308	Russia	Cargo truck	Unknown		
KAMAZ	Russia	Cargo Truck	Unknown		6x6 truck.
KrAZ-255	Soviet Union	Cargo truck	Unknown		Being replaced with Russian KAMAZ and Ural trucks.
Ural 4320	Russia	Cargo truck	Unknown		Some are used as fuel or water tankers.
Ural 43206	Russia	Cargo truck	Unknown		
ZiL-130	Soviet Union	Cargo truck	Unknown		Being replaced with Russian KAMAZ and Ural trucks.
ZiL-131	Soviet Union	Cargo truck	Unknown		Being replaced with Russian KAMAZ and Ural trucks.
Tata LPTA 713 TC	India	Cargo truck	Unknown		Seen on parade preparations.
TATA LPTA 2038C	India	Cargo truck	Unknown		Seen on parade
Utility vehicles
GAZ-69A	Soviet Union	Light utility vehicle	Unknown		Seen in use during the Second Nagorno-Karabakh war. Being replaced with Russian UAZ Jeeps.
UAZ-452	Soviet Union	Light utility vehicle	Unknown		
UAZ-469	Soviet Union	Light utility vehicle	Unknown		Being replaced with Russian UAZ Jeeps.
UAZ-3962	Russia	Ambulance vehicle	Unknown		Used by medical units.
UAZ Hunter	Russia	Light utility vehicle	Unknown		
UAZ Patriot	Russia	Light utility vehicle	Unknown		The UAZ-23602-130 and UAZ-23632 variants are also used.
Nissan Navara	Japan	Light utility vehicle	Unknown		
Tata Xenon	India	Light utility vehicle	Unknown		Transporting Chinese Military Robots.
Iveco Daily	Italy	Light utility vehicle	Unknown		
Spec operation vehicles
M-3 Chaborz	Russia	All-terrain vehicle	Unknown		Used spec ops.

=== Engineering and recovery vehicles ===
Name	Origin	Type	Photo	Notes
Engineering and recovery vehicles
MT-LB	Soviet Union	Armored engineering vehicle		Military engineering variant.
BTS-4	Soviet Union	Armored recovery vehicle		
BREM-1	Soviet Union	Armored recovery vehicle		
BREM-D	Soviet Union	Armored recovery vehicle		
PMZ-4	Soviet Union	Minelayer		
BTM-3	Soviet Union	Trench digger		

=== Electronic warfare ===
Name	Origin	Type	Number	Photo	Notes
Electronic warfare
R-330ZH	Russia	Automated jamming station	Unknown		Seen during Parade in 2026.
R-330P	Soviet Union	Automated jamming station	Unknown		Unknown
Borisoglebsk-2	Russia	Automated jamming station	Unknown		
Kvant 1L222 Avtobaza	Russia	Electronic warfare vehicle	Unknown		
Infauna K1Sh1 UNSh-12	Russia	Electronic warfare vehicle	Unknown		Military parade in 2016.
Repellent-1	Russia	Electronic warfare	Unknown		
Zen Anti-drone System	India	UAV jamming station	Unknown		Ordered in 2023
Maraghuh	Armenia	Electronic warfare vehicle	Unknown		Seen during Military Parade in 2026

== Artillery ==
Name	Photo	Origin	Caliber	Number	Notes
Towed Artillery
D-44		Soviet Union	85mm	N/A	
M-30		Soviet Union	122mm	N/A	
D-30		Soviet Union	122mm	60	
D-1		Soviet Union	152mm	2	
D-20		Soviet Union	152mm	34	
2A36 Giatsint-B		Soviet Union	152mm	26	
ATAGS ('Tork')		India	155mm L/52	6	84 more planned.
Trajan		India	155mm	?	The Trajan gun is designed for high mobility and rapid deployment, capable of firing NATO-standard 155 mm projectiles, including advanced "smart" munitions, reported Manu Pubby of ET Defence.
Self-Propelled Artillery
2S1 Gvozdika		Soviet Union	122mm	9	
2S3 Akatsiya		Soviet Union	152mm	28	
MaRG 155-BR ('Mihr')		India	155 mm	72	Wheeled self-propelled howitzer, based on a 4×4 truck. Product of Kalyani Strategic Systems (KSSL).72 ordered in November 2022, all delivered by January 2026.
CAESAR		France	155 mm	36	Ordered in June 2024. French media reported an order of 36, to be delivered within 15 months.
Multiple Rocket Launcher Artillery
Pinaka ('Shant')		India	214mm	4 batteries (24 launchers)	Armenia has ordered 4 batteries of Pinaka Mk1 systems worth $250 million.
Pinaka Guided		India	214mm	N/A	The delivery of Guided Pinaka rockets commenced in January 2026. 700 rockets delivered in 2026. Range 75–80 km
BM-21 'Grad'		Soviet Union	122mm	Up to 50	
Atlant		Armenia	122mm	N/A	Range up to 40km. Seen during Parade in Yerevan.
TOS-1A		Russia	220mm	N/A	
BM-30 'Smerch'		Russia	300mm	2	
WM-80		China	273mm	8	
AR1A		China	300mm	6	Reportedly purchased from China.

=== Ballistic missile systems ===
Name	Origin	Type	Number	Photo	Notes
Scud (R-17 Elbrus)	Soviet Union	Tactical ballistic missile	7+		
OTR-21 Tochka	Soviet Union	Tactical ballistic missile	3+		
9K720 Iskander	Russia	Short-range ballistic missile	4		Iskander-E revealed during the preparations for the 2016 military parade in Yerevan. Armenia acquired the system from Russia, who delivered it as a part of a larger sale of weapons to Armenia, financed through a $200 million loan from Russia.

=== Anti-aircraft / UAV-interceptor ===
Model	Image	Origin	Caliber	Quantity	Details
Static surface-to-air missile system
S-75 Dvina		Soviet Union	N/A		
S-125		Soviet Union	N/A	4	Four sites were active in 2020: Yerevan, Martuni, Vardenis, and Stepanakert.
S-300PT		Soviet Union	N/A		
UAV interceptor loitering munition
DDS-10K		Armenia	N/A		Counter UAV system. Maximum altitude 8000m, 200km/h speed. Seen during Parade in 2026
Mobile surface-to-air missile system
S-300PS		Russia	N/A	50	50 systems, unknown variant.
2K11 Krug		Soviet Union	N/A		
Buk M1-2		Russia	N/A	6	It was intended replace the aging Krug and Kub systems, but due the lack of funds only two batteries were purchased.
Akash ('Lusan')		India	N/A	4 (unknown on order)	Armenia signed a deal, worth ₹6,000 crore (equivalent to ₹69 billion or US$720 million in 2026), with Bharat Dynamics Limited in 2022. The first Akash battery (4 launchers and a Rajendra radar) was delivered in November 2024.
2K12 Kub		Soviet Union	N/A		Unknown number in service as of 2024
S-125 Neva/Pechora		Soviet Union; Armenia	N/A		Some were upgraded with KAMAZ truck mounted launchers.
Tor-M2KM		Russia	N/A		
9K33 Osa		Soviet Union	N/A	~75	At least 35 Osa AKs were purchased from Jordan.
9K35 Strela-10		Soviet Union	N/A		
Majid AD-08		Iran	N/A		Seen at the May 2026 military parade in Yerevan.
anti-aircraft guns
KS-19		Soviet Union	100 mm		Used as field artillery. Some mounted on MT-LBs.
ZU-23-2		Soviet Union	23 mm		Some mounted on MT-LBs.
Zastava M55		Yugoslavia	20 mm		Some mounted on MT-LBs.
ZSU-23-4 Shilka		Soviet Union	23 mm		

=== Proposed, in negotiation purchases ===
Name	Origin	Type	Photo	Notes
VL MICA	France	Mobile surface-to-air missile system		French Defense Minister Sébastien Lecornu mentioned its possible sale during his visit to Armenia in February 2024.
SAMP/T	France	Mobile surface-to-air missile system		French Defense Minister Sébastien Lecornu mentioned its possible sale during his visit to Armenia in February 2024.
Akash-NG	India	Mobile surface-to-air missile system		Armenia currently possesses Akash-1S and seeks for Akash-NG.
Pralay	India	Short-range tactical ballistic missile		

=== Radar systems ===
Name	Origin	Type	Number	Photo	Notes
Radar systems
5N63S "Flap Lid"	Soviet Union	Radar	Unknown		
P-18 "Spoon Rest D"	Soviet Union	Radar	Unknown		
Avtobaza	Russia	Radar	Unknown		Part of Russian-Armenian arms deal.
P-12 radar	Russia	Radar	Unknown		
P-15 radar	Russia	Radar	Unknown		
P-40 radar	Russia	Radar	Unknown		
Snar-10 Big Fred	Russia	Ground surveillance radar	Unknown		
Kasta 2E2	Russia	Radar	Unknown		Seen during Parade on 28th May 2026.
Swathi Weapon Locating Radar ('Paylatsu')	India	Counter-battery radar	4		Four radars delivered for a cost of US$40 million in 2020.
GM-200	France	AESA 3D Radar	3		French Defense Minister Sébastien Lecornu said Armenia would buy three Ground Master 200 Radar Systems from the French defense group Thales.
Rajendra	India	Fire-control radar	Unknown		Radar for Akash weapon system
Central acquisition radar (3D-CAR)	India	long-range high-resolution 3D surveillance radar	Unknown		Radar For Akash weapon system

== Aircraft ==
=== Unmanned aerial / ground vehicles ===
Name	Photo	Origin	Notes
Unmanned combat aerial vehicles UCAVs
UL-650		Armenia	Seen during 2026 meeting with Indian military chief to Armenia. UCAV is loaded with guided bombs from CJSC.
Dragonfly-4		Armenia	Multi-role loitering munition classified as a medium range UAV with reconnaissance and bombing capabilities. Equipped with 20 400g mini bombs.
CH-4B		China	Seen on Republic Square, Yerevan for parade preparations. Armed with AR-1 and AR-2 missiles.
Reconnaissance UAVs
Storm-320		Armenia	VTOL UAV seen during visit of military chief of India to Armenia in 2026 Made by IDS
UL-300		Armenia	Introduced along UL-350 and UL-450 in 2023
UL-350		Armenia	Introduced in 2022, seen during 2022 military trainings.
UL-450		Armenia	Introduced in 2023, showcased in early 2024.
UL-550		Armenia	Seen during Parade in 2026. Improved version of UL-450 with longer range, endurance and slower speed.
Orlan-10		Russia	Reportedly used in the Second Nagorno-Karabakh war.
Shield AI MQ-35 V-BAT		United States	Purchased for US$11 million
FPV
?		Unknown	Unknown FPV drone seen during weapon showcase with Indian military chief in Armenia during 2026
X-8		Armenia	FPV drone designed for precision short-range strikes and reconnaissance missions
X-10		Armenia	fiber optical FPV drone designed to resist electronic warfare (EW) and deliver precise short-range kamikaze-style strikes seen during Indian military chief visit to Armenia in 2026
Mavic DJI		China	Used for reconnaissance
Loitering munitions
ASN-301		China	Chinese heavy loitering muntion with 30kg warhead and 288km range. Seen during Military Parade in Yerevan.
AW-5R		Armenia	Armenian made light loitering munition, launchable from hand. Made by AirWorker
Dragonfly-3		Armenia	Armenian made loitering munition with an operational distance of 200 km
Dragonfly-3.1		Armenia	Armenian made loitering munition for SEAD Operations
Dragonfly-1		Armenia	Armenian made loitering muntion with operational distance of 40 km
Draco-50		Armenia	Armenian made tactical loitering muntion with flight distance of 100 km Can be launched from air and ground.
Ultima-250		ArmeniaSoviet Union	The Ultima-250 is a Soviet-era designed 250-kilogram general-purpose air-dropped glide bomb with 60 km distance
MDS-1		Armenia	The MDS-1 is classified as a loitering munition and is characterized as a micro, short-range, and short-endurance system capable of kamikaze-style strikes.
Zeel A1		Armenia	On vehicle mounted container for drone launching
ALS-50		India	VTOL loitering munition seen in 2024 Armenian special forces training
Peron-15		Armenia	loitering munition with AI-driven functions enabling it to form swarm formations
Unmanned Ground Vehicles UGVs
Unknown		Armenia	Unknown UGV with mine laying function, made by Davaro defence systems
Torq		Armenia	Unknown UGV with machine gun, made by Davaro defence systems
other
Robo Dog		China	Quadrupedal robot for reconnaissance and survaillance. Also for detecting / neutralization of explosives, as well as transportation of weapons and special equipment.

== Bibliography ==
- International Institute for Strategic Studies (2023). Hackett, James (ed.). The Military Balance: 2023. Routledge. ISBN 978-1-000-91073-5.
- International Institute for Strategic Studies (2024). "Russia and Eurasia". The Military Balance 2024. 124. Taylor & Francis: 178−179. doi:10.1080/04597222.2024.2298592.
- International Institute for Strategic Studies (12 February 2025). The Military Balance 2025. London: Routledge. ISBN 9781003630760.
- Jones, Richard D.; Ness, Leland, eds. (2010). Jane's Infantry Weapons 2010-2011 (36th ed.). Janes Information Group. ISBN 978-0-7106-2908-1.
- Hoyle, Craig (December 2023). World Air Forces 2024. FlightGlobal (Report). London: Flight Global Insight.
