= Hełm wz. 2000 =

Polish combat helmet

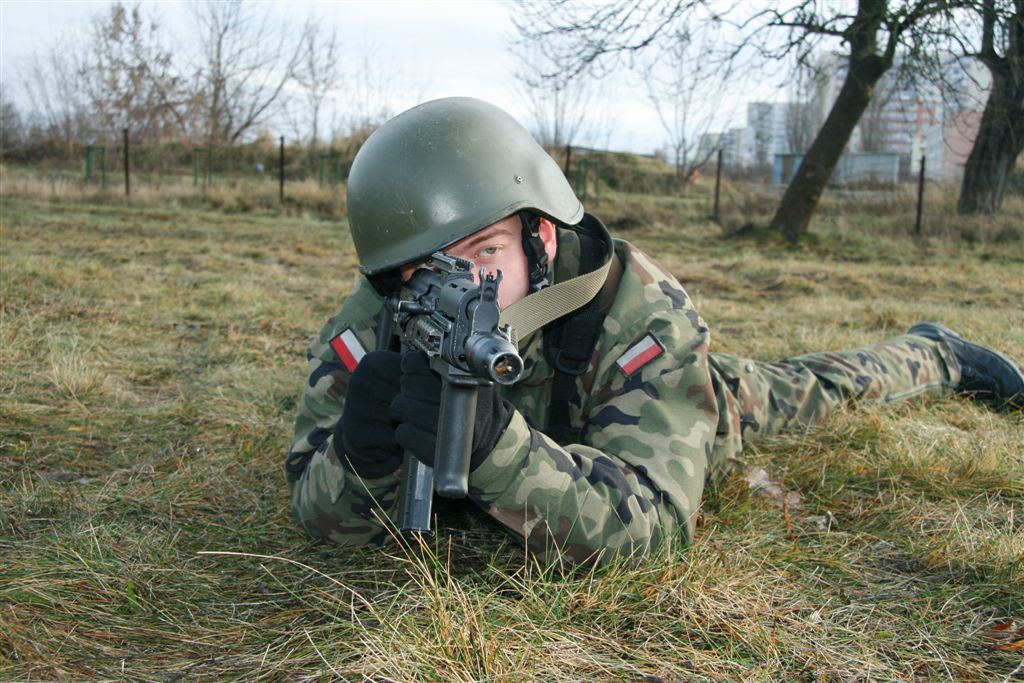
- An up-close image of a Polish Army soldier wearing a wz. 2000 helmet
- Type: Combat helmet
- Place of origin: Poland

Service history
- Used by: Poland; Ukraine
- Wars: Iraq War; War in Afghanistan (2001–2021); Russo-Ukrainian War

Production history
- Designer: Military Institute of Armament Technology
- Manufacturer: Resal; Maskpol
- Produced: 2000-2005
- No. produced: 10 000

Specifications
- Weight: Size 2: 1.4 kg (3.1 lb)

The Hełm wz. 2000 is a combat helmet used by the Polish Army. It's withdrawn from Polish service in favor of the wz. 2005 helmet. The main producers of helmets were RESAL and Maskpol.

== History ==
The helmet was developed by Military Institute of Armament Technology based on the German Schubert helmet. The internal equipment is based on a profiled rim with a so-called hammock. The sweatband is made of black leather (similar to the wz. 93 helmet). It was attached to the supporting hoop with Velcro. The suspension bands are black. Produced in three sizes - from 1 to 3 (1 is the smallest and 3 is the largest). The ballistic resistance of the helmet is at the level of general military helmets of this type (>610 m/s). The main disadvantage of the wz. 2000 is limited compatibility with helmet-mounted night vision devices according to NATO rules.

The wz. 2000 helmet can be fitted with cloth helmet covers in wz. 93 Pantera camoflauge pattern (woodland and desert version) or blue cover intended for UN forces.

In addition to the basic version, a version for aeromobile forces was developed (an additional rear leather cushion was inserted inside the helmet) and an optionally mounted face shield.

The wz. 2000 helmet was produced for a short period of about 5 years when it was replaced by the wz. 2005 helmets. It was used by Polish soldiers during the wars in Iraq and Afghanistan. It was completely withdrawn from use in the Polish Army in the second decade of the 21st century.

After the warranty expired (10 years from the date of production), the helmets were directed to civilian sale in the military surplus. This coincided with the outbreak of the conflict in eastern Ukraine in 2014. The wz. 2000 helmets, along with the older wz. 93 models, were bought by various pro-Ukrainian organizations and sent to fighting units.The situation repeated itself in 2022.

== Users ==
- Poland: Used by Polish Armed Forces until replaced by the wz. 2005 helmet.
- Ukraine: During the War in Donbas and Russian invasion, wz. 2000 helmets were widely purchased from military surplus in Poland and sent to fighting units.

== Gallery ==
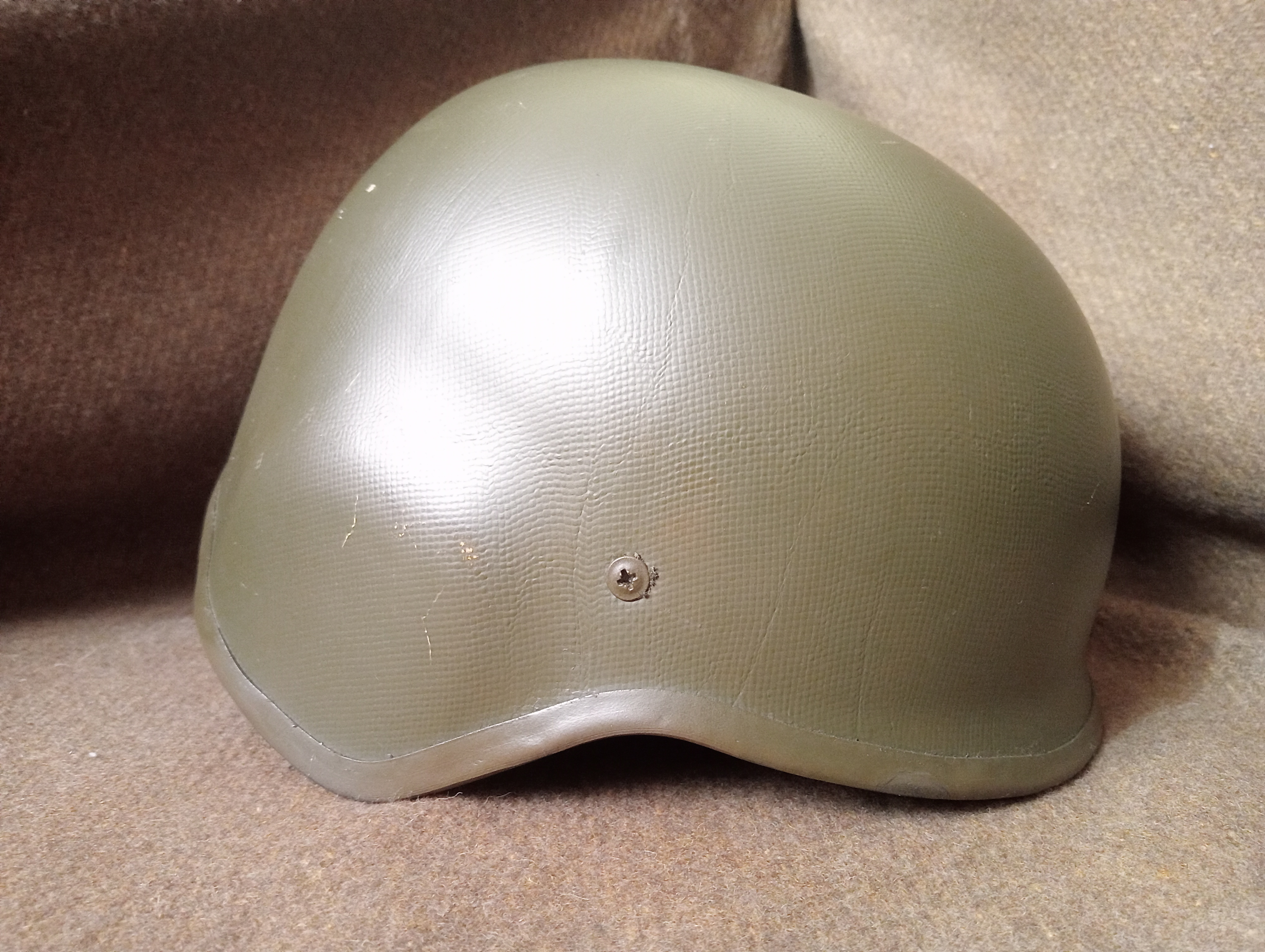
The wz. 2000 helmet without cloth cover.

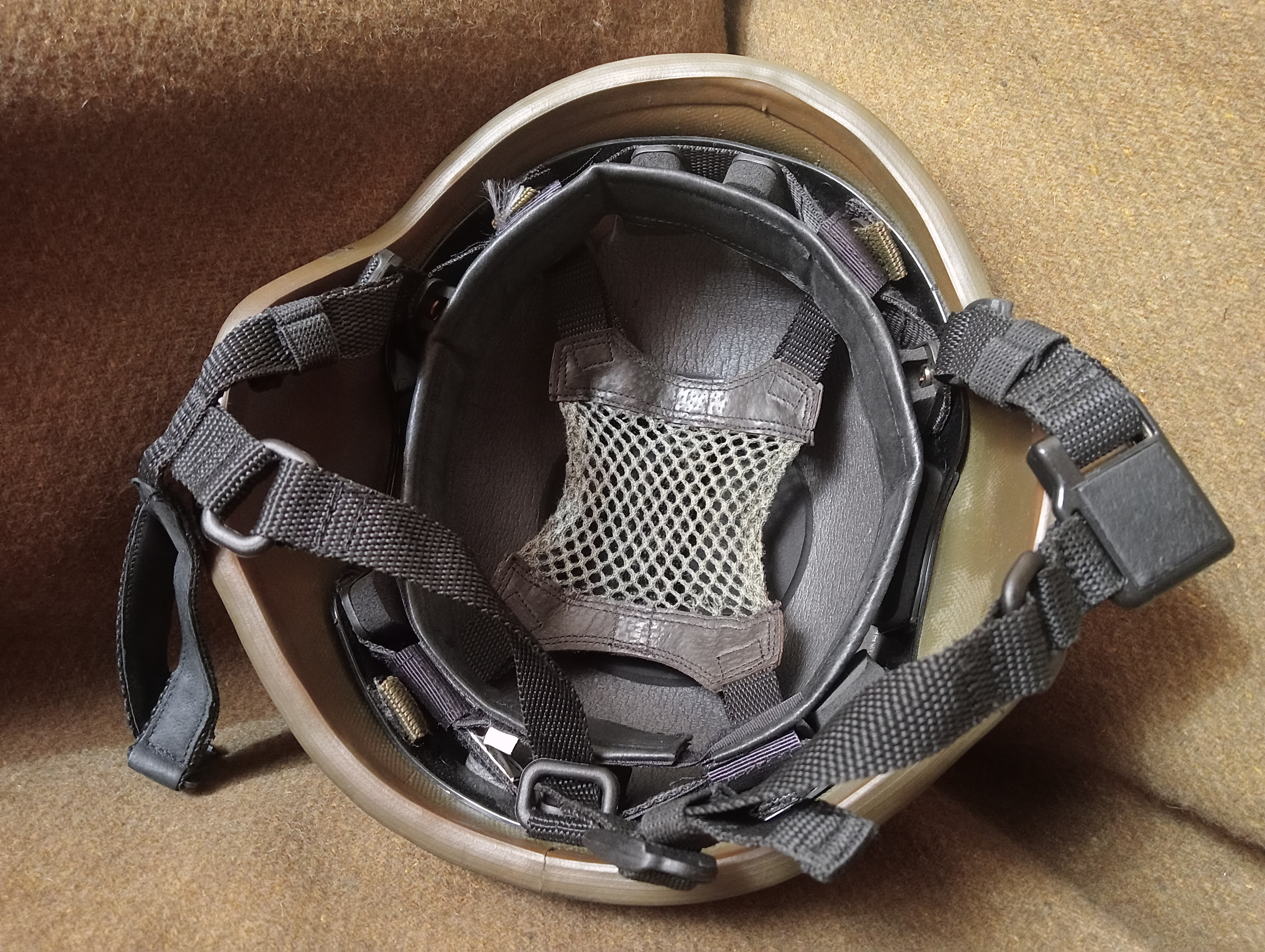
The interior of a wz. 2000 helmet.

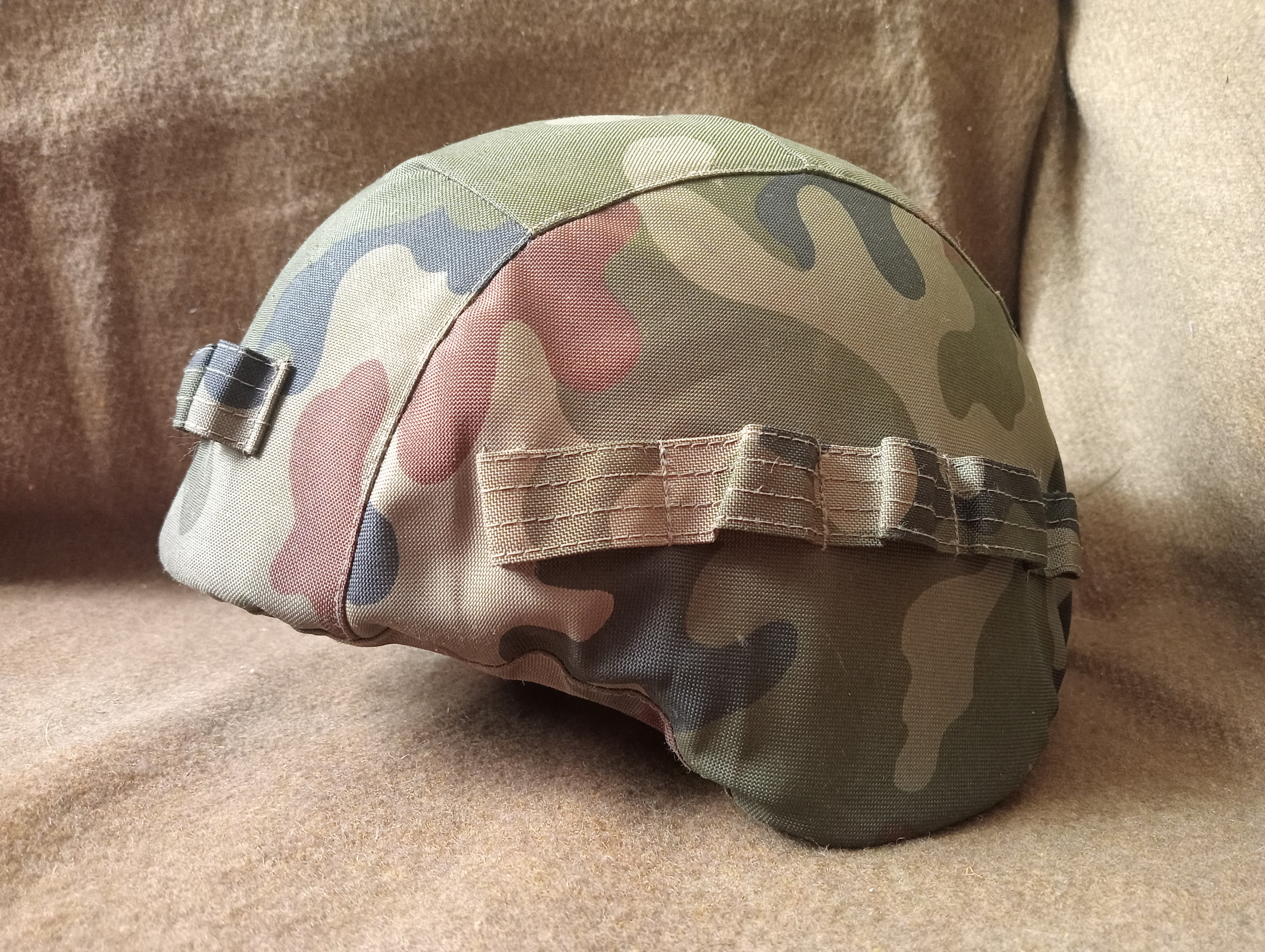
The wz. 2000 helmet with cloth cover in wz. 93 Pantera camo.

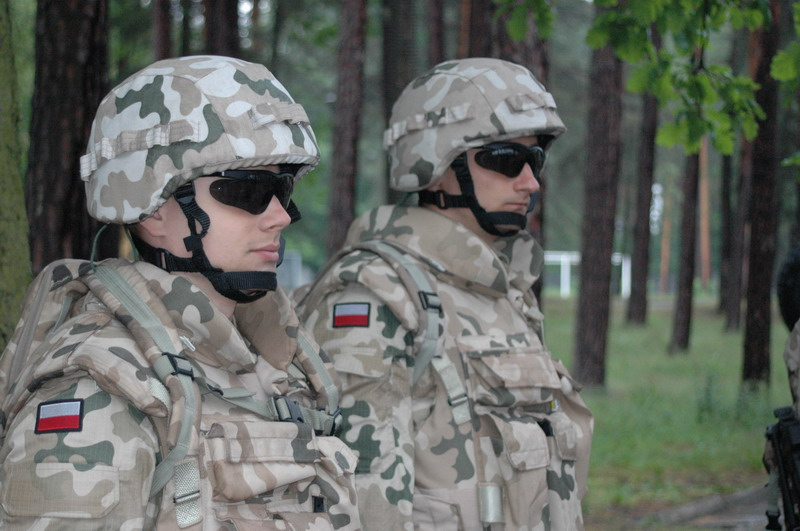
The wz. 2000 helmets in cloth cover in desert version of wz. 93 Pantera, 2005.

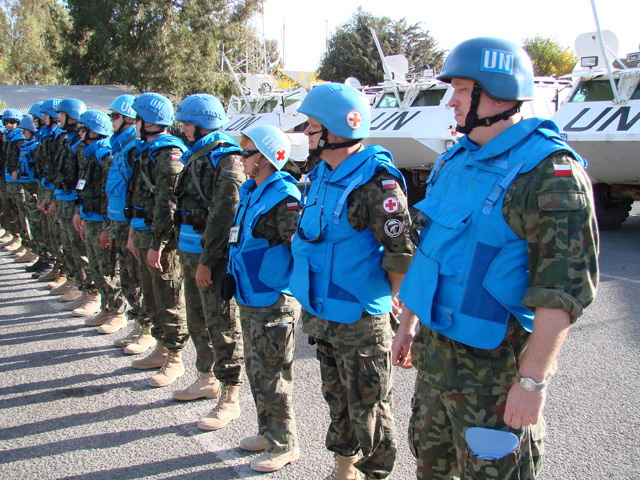
Polish soldiers during UN mission in Syria, 2007.

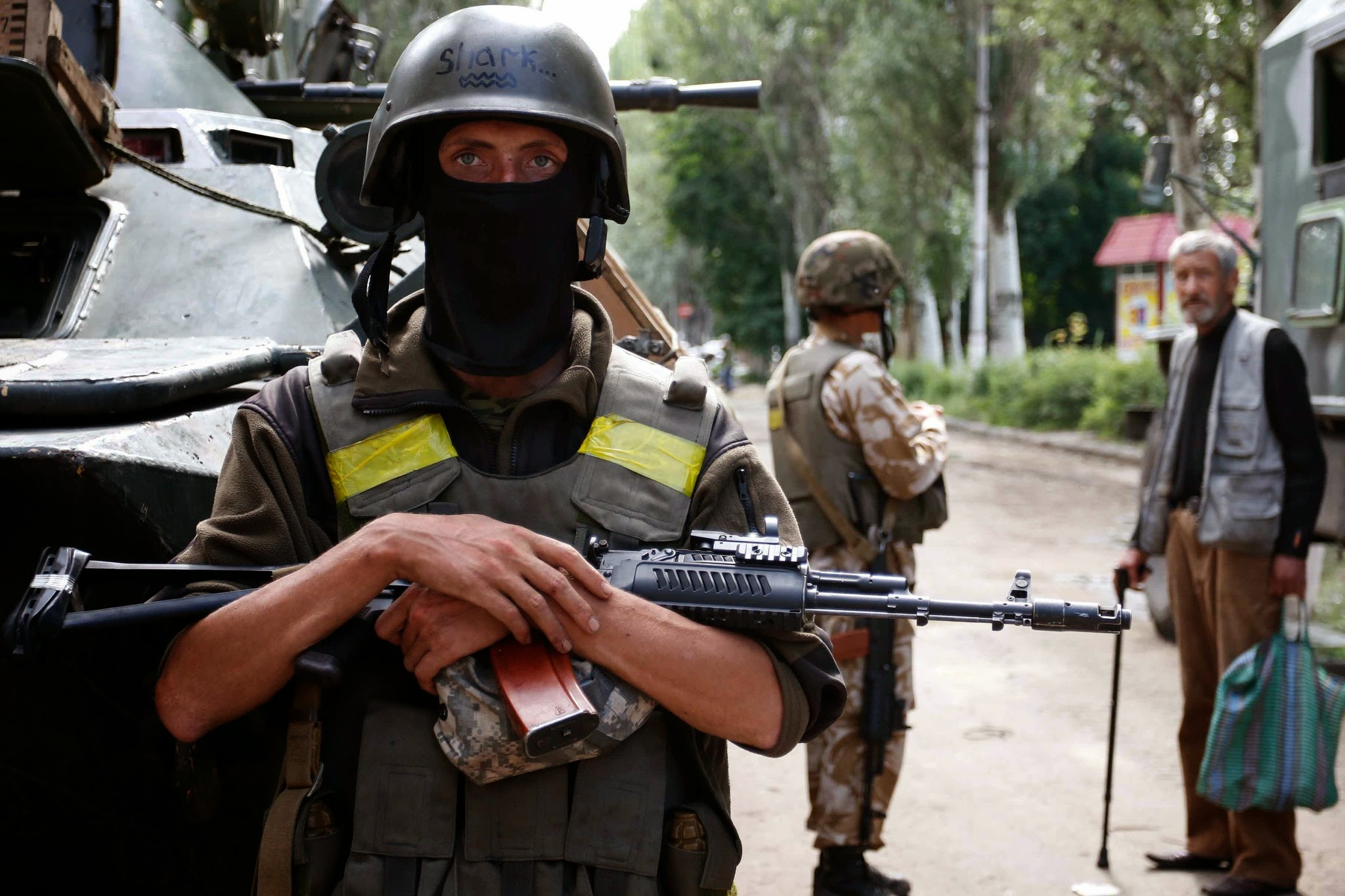
Ukrainian soldiers in Sloviansk, July 9, 2014.

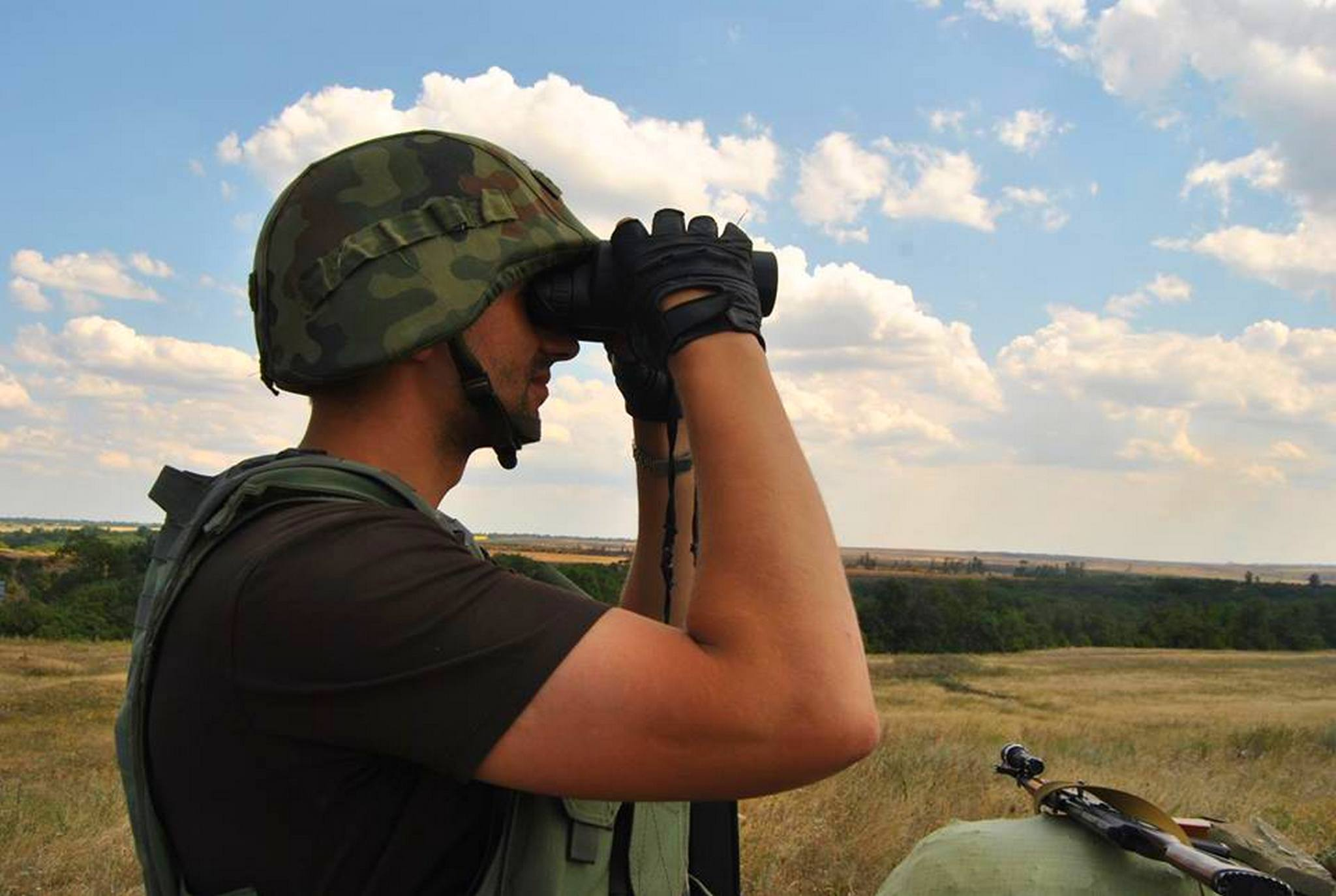
War in Donbas, 2016.
