= Hełm wz. 93 =

Combat helmet of the Polish Army

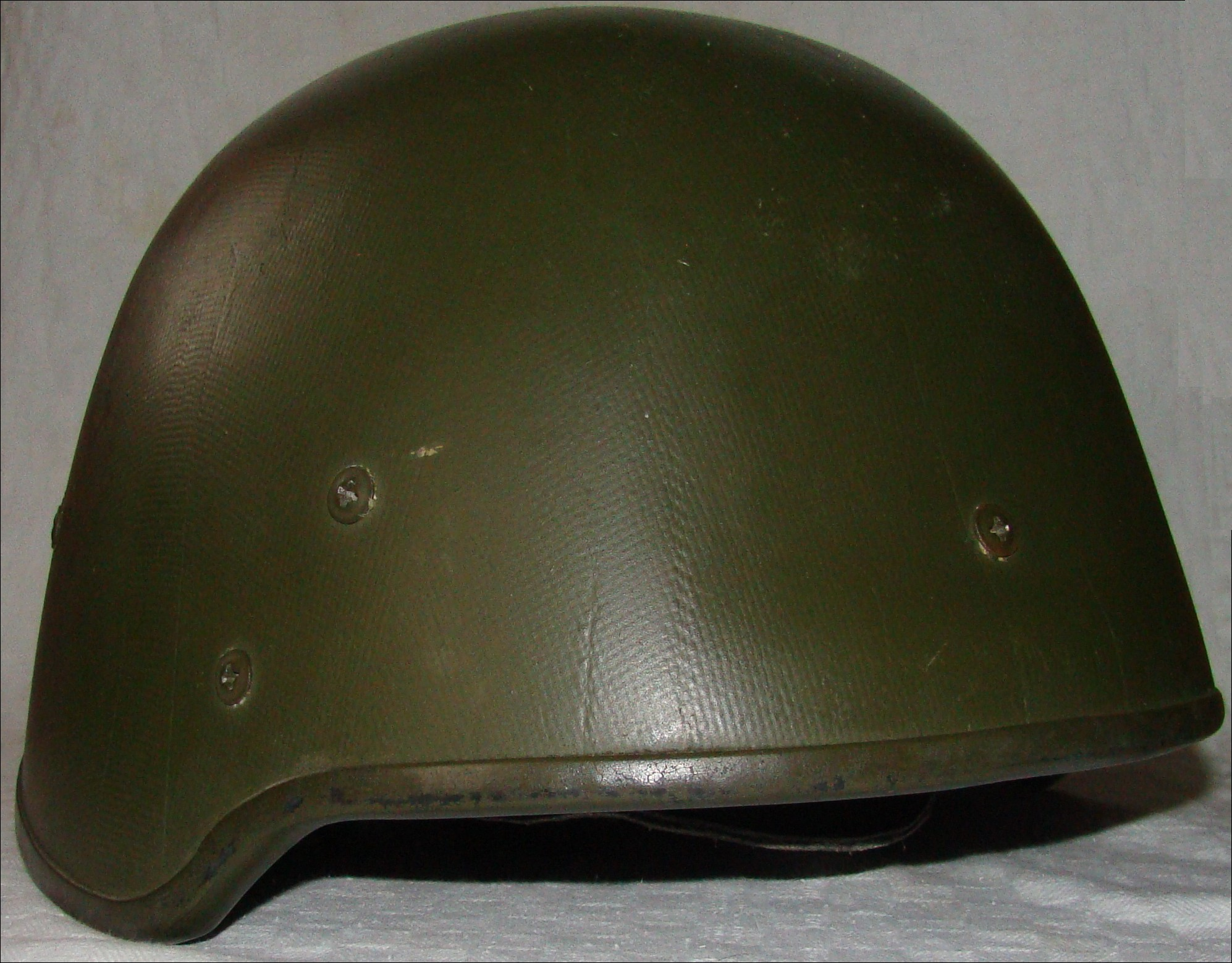
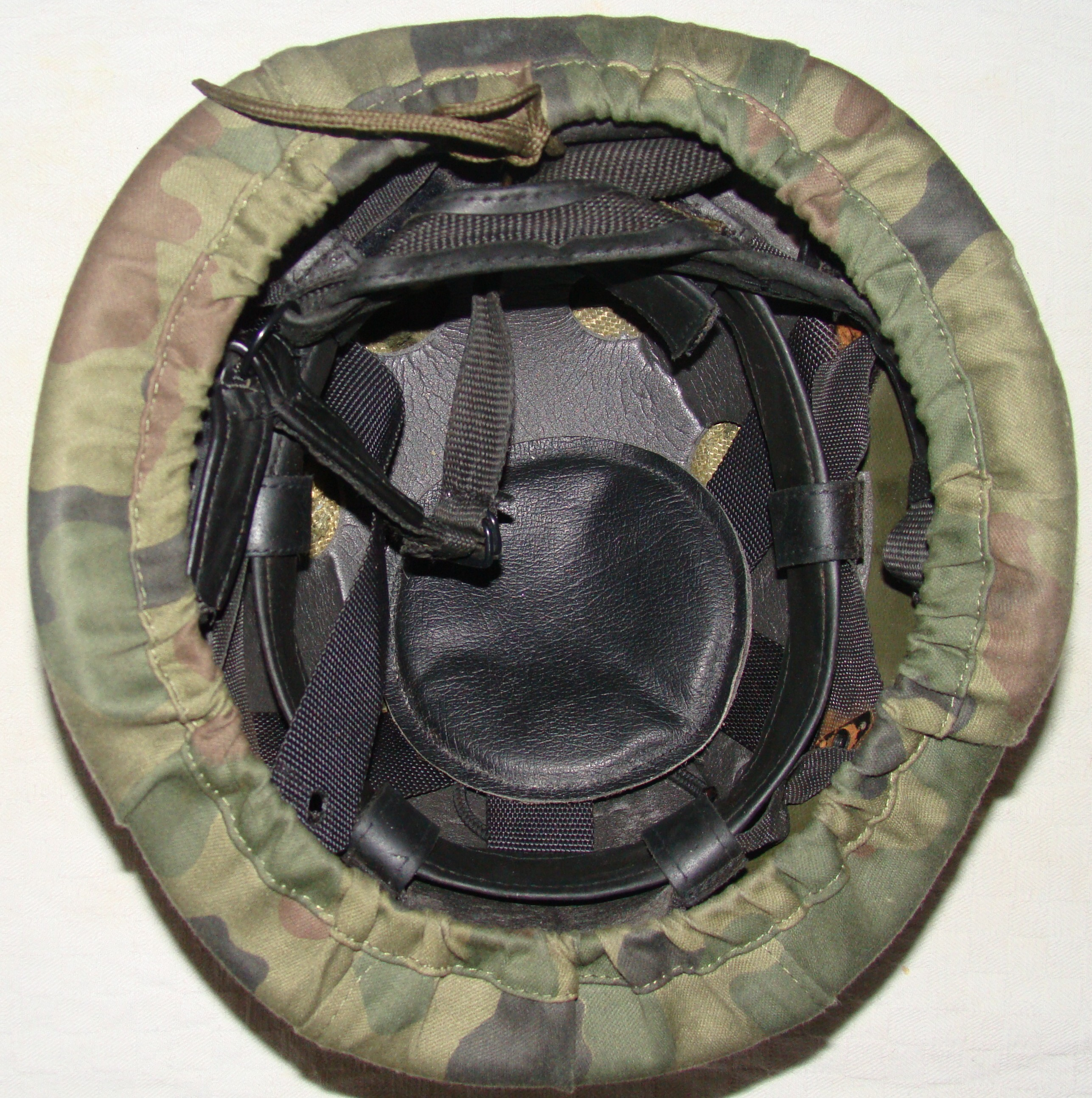
- Polish wz. 93 helmet showing the helmet and interior.
- Type: Combat Helmet
- Place of origin: Poland

Service history
- In service: 1993-2011 (in Polish Armed Forces)
- Used by: See Users
- Wars: Bosnian War; Kosovo War; Iraq War; War in Afghanistan (2001–2021); War in Donbas; 2016 Nagorno-Karabakh conflict Russo-Ukrainian War

Production history
- Designer: Military Institute of Armament Technology
- Designed: 1993
- Manufacturer: PZL Mielec; Resal; Bella
- Produced: 1993–2000

Specifications
- Weight: 1,4 kg (3,08 lbs)

The Hełm wz. 93 is a combat helmet that was used by the Polish Army from 1993 until it was succeeded by the wz. 2000 helmet.

== History ==
It was the first composite Polish Army helmet (before it, there was also a prototype, the so-called Aleksander Dutka helmet). The wz. 93 helmet was intended to replace older steel helmets wz. 50 and wz. 67. The shape of the shell is quite original, the liner is made of artificial leather dyed black. The helmet was painted green and came in two sizes: small (M) and large (D). The wz. 93 helmet can be fitted with camouflaged helmet covers (wz. 89 Puma and wz. 93 Pantera).

The wz. 93 produced by Bella company is certified by WITU and the German Shooting Research Center in Mellrichstadt No. B-940049.

== Variants ==
=== Kirasa BSH-E ===
Russian clone of the wz.93.

== Users ==
- Armenia: Secondary-use helmet.
- Poland: Used by Polish Army until 2000s. Replaced by the wz. 2000 and wz. 2005.
- Russia: Uses the BSH-E, a Russian clone of the wz.93. Modifications include a different type of liner and chinstrap.
- Ukraine: Used during war in Donbas and Russian invasion in 2022.

== Gallery ==
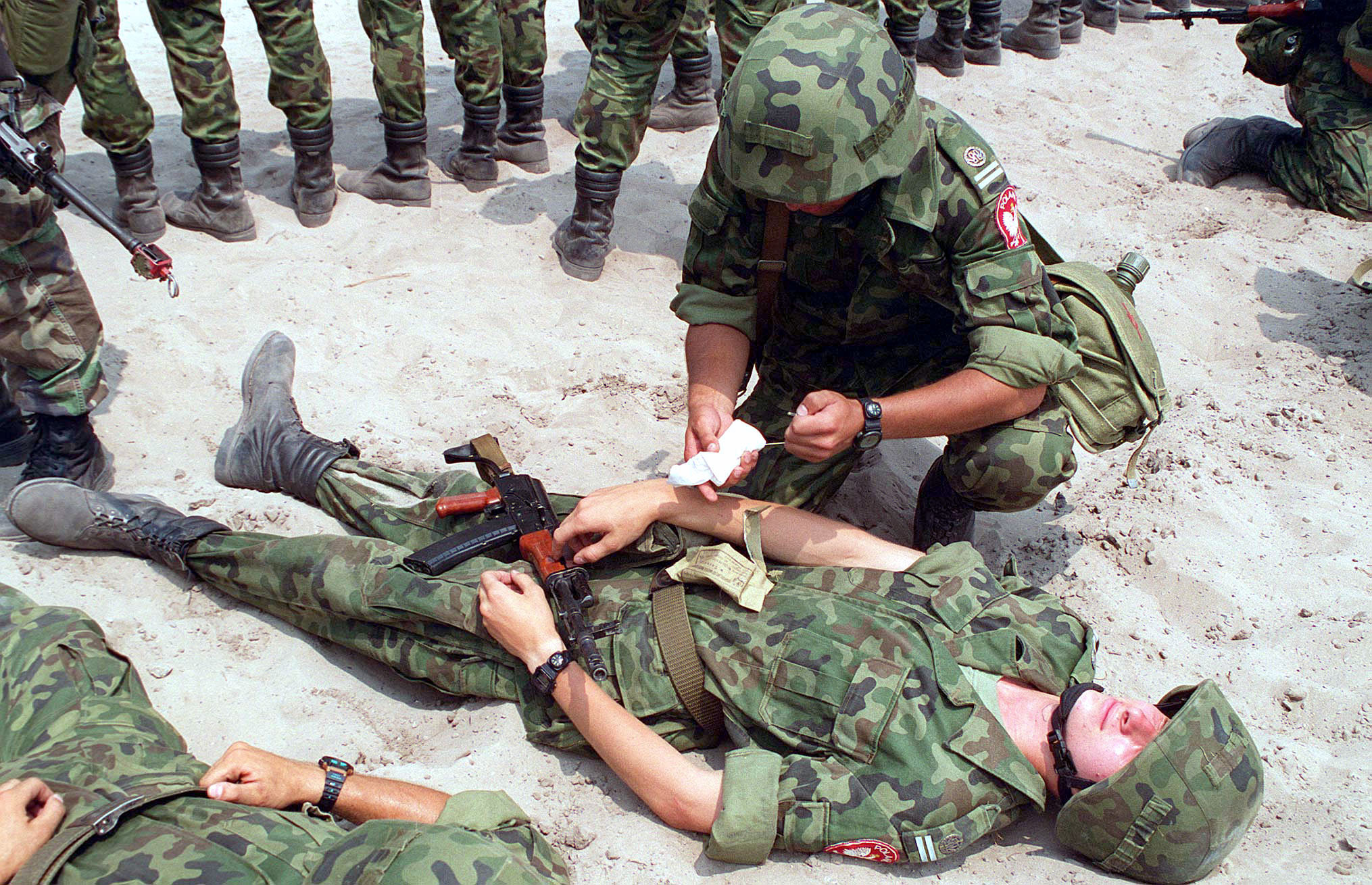
Polish soldiers during training exercise, 1996.

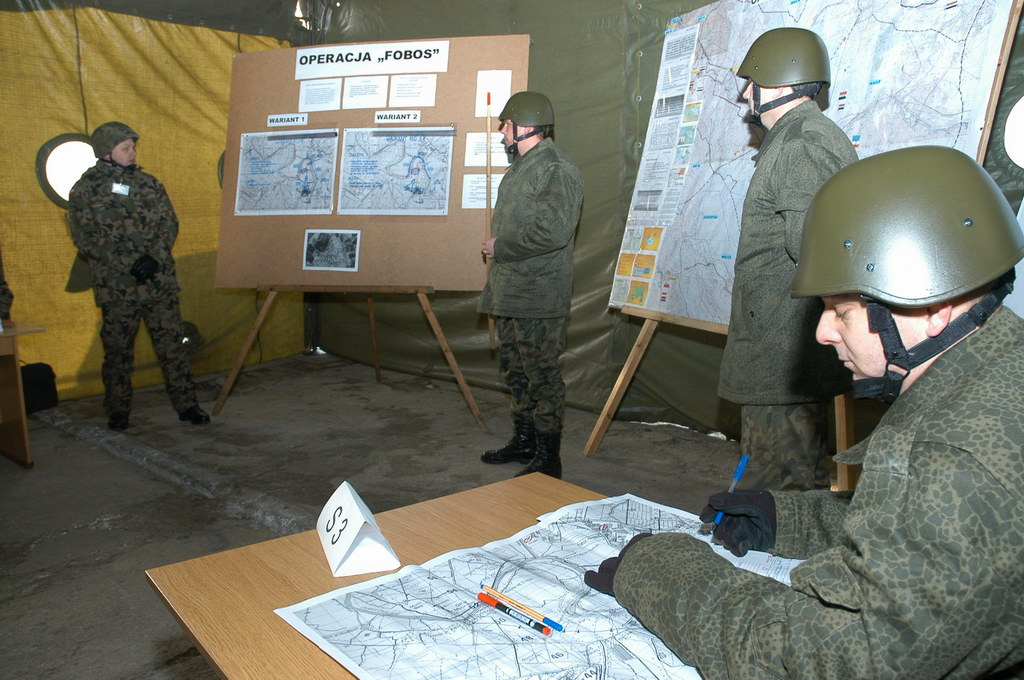
Polish soldiers in 2006 with wz. 93 helmets.

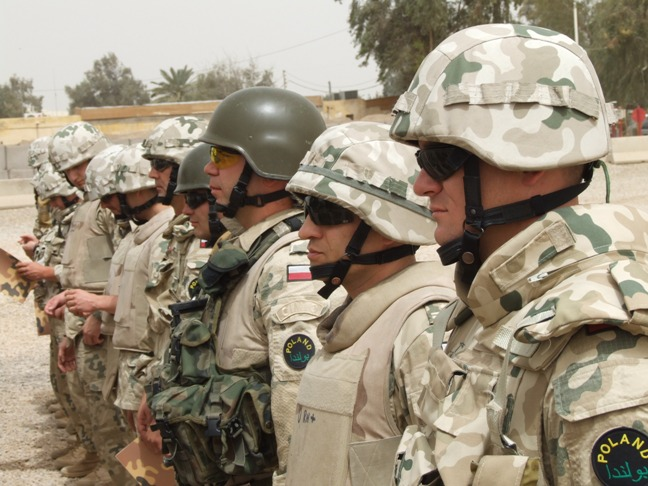
Polish soldiers in Iraq using wz. 93 and wz. 2000 helmets, 2007.

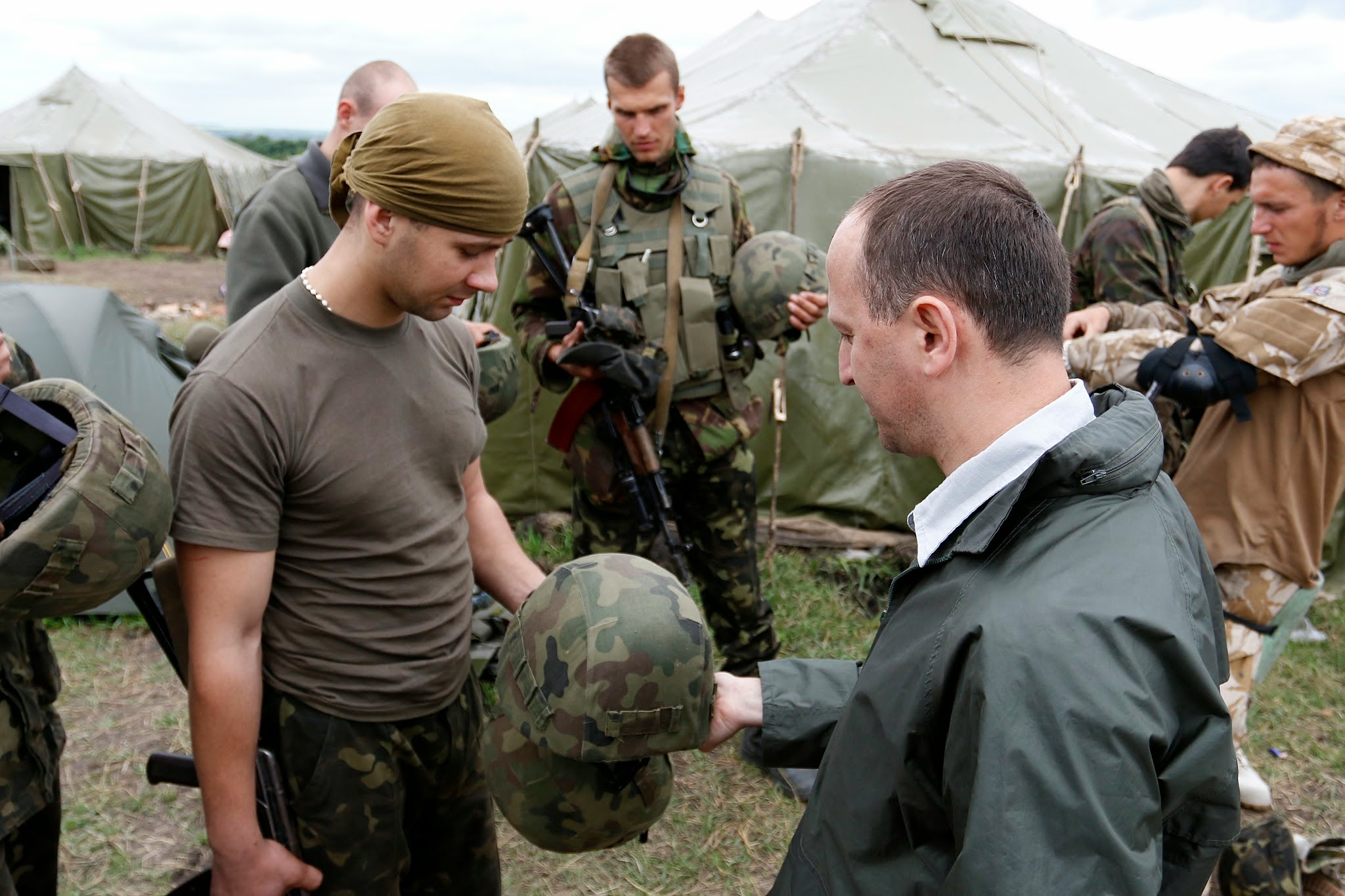
Ukrainian soldiers in 2014, with wz. 93 helmets.

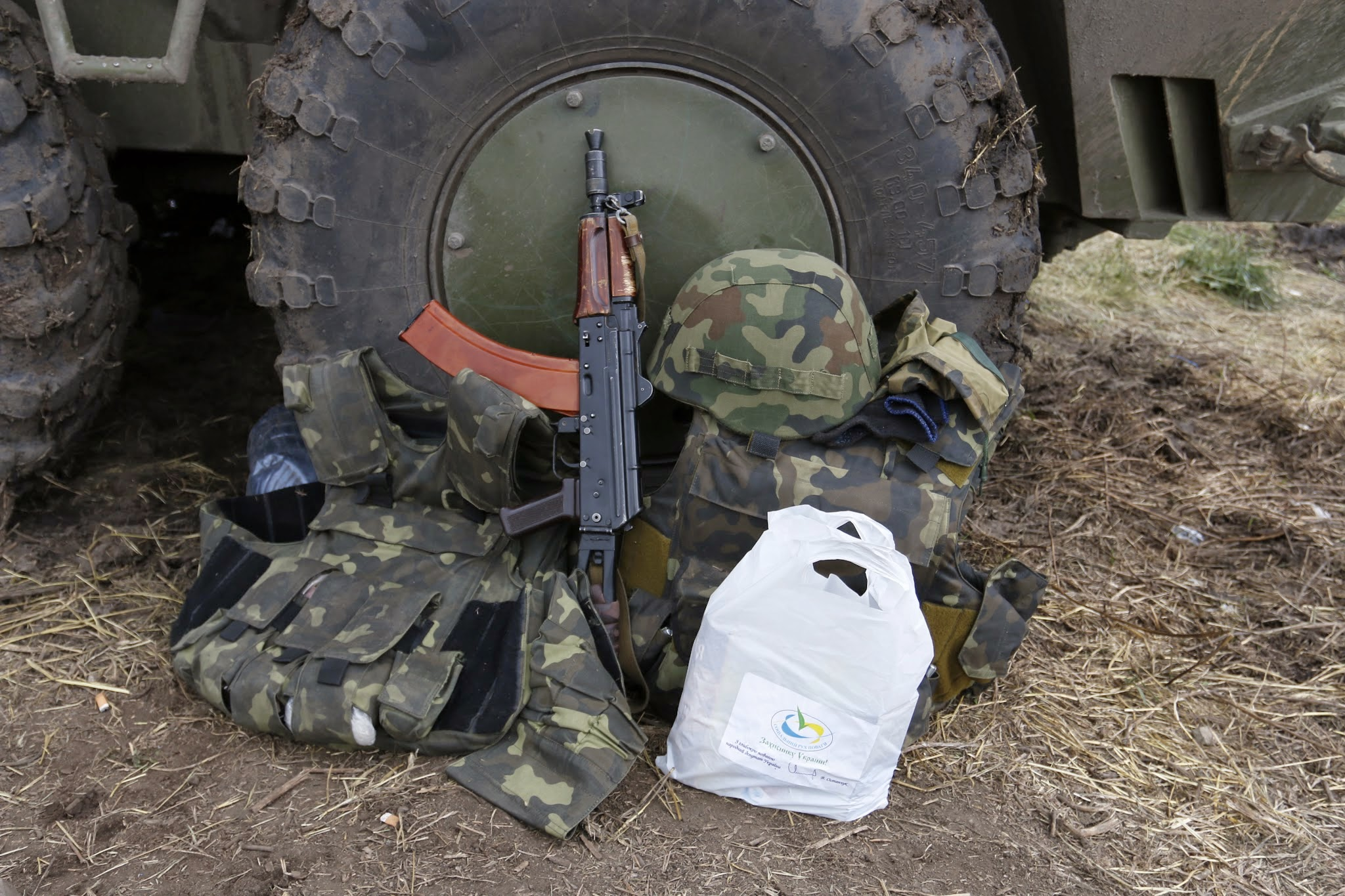
The hełm wz. 93 with other ukrainian equipment, 2014.
