= Storm-320 =

Armenian UAV

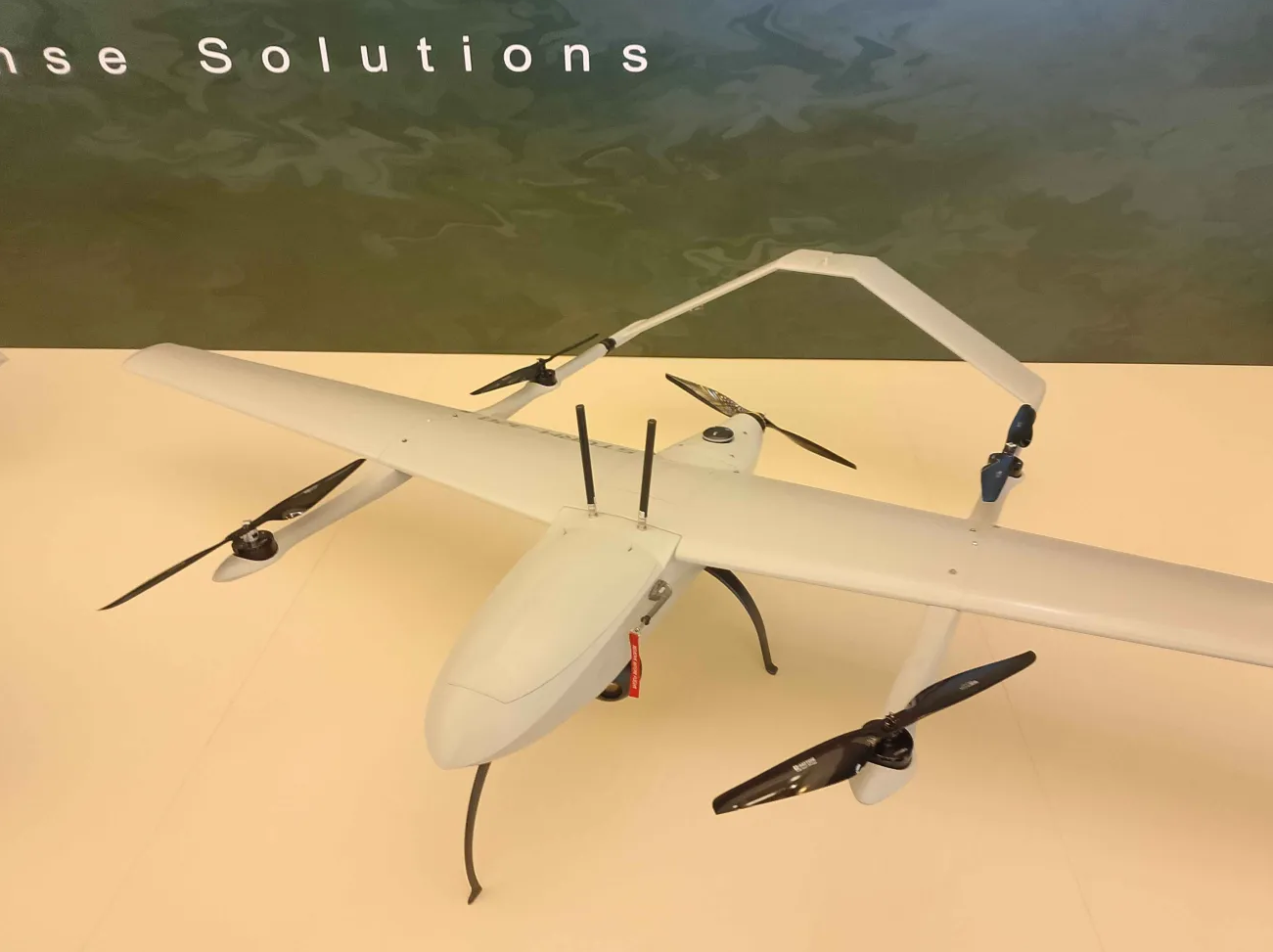

General information
- Type: Unmanned aerial vehicle
- National origin: Armenia
- Designer: Intelligent Defense Solutions
- Primary user: Armed Forces of Armenia

History
- Introduction date: In service since 2025

Storm-320 (Armenian: Հրդեհ-320) is an Armenian unmanned aerial vehicle (UAV) with VTOL capabilities. The Storm-320 has four configurations. The UAV is made for Reconnaissance, long endurance, Kamikaze and FPV drone carrying tasks.

== Appearance ==
Storm-320 was first seen during India’s top military commander's visit to Armenia in early February 2026. Second appearance was during the military parade in Yerevan 2026.

== Service ==
- Armenia - Armed Forces of Armenia

== Specifications ==
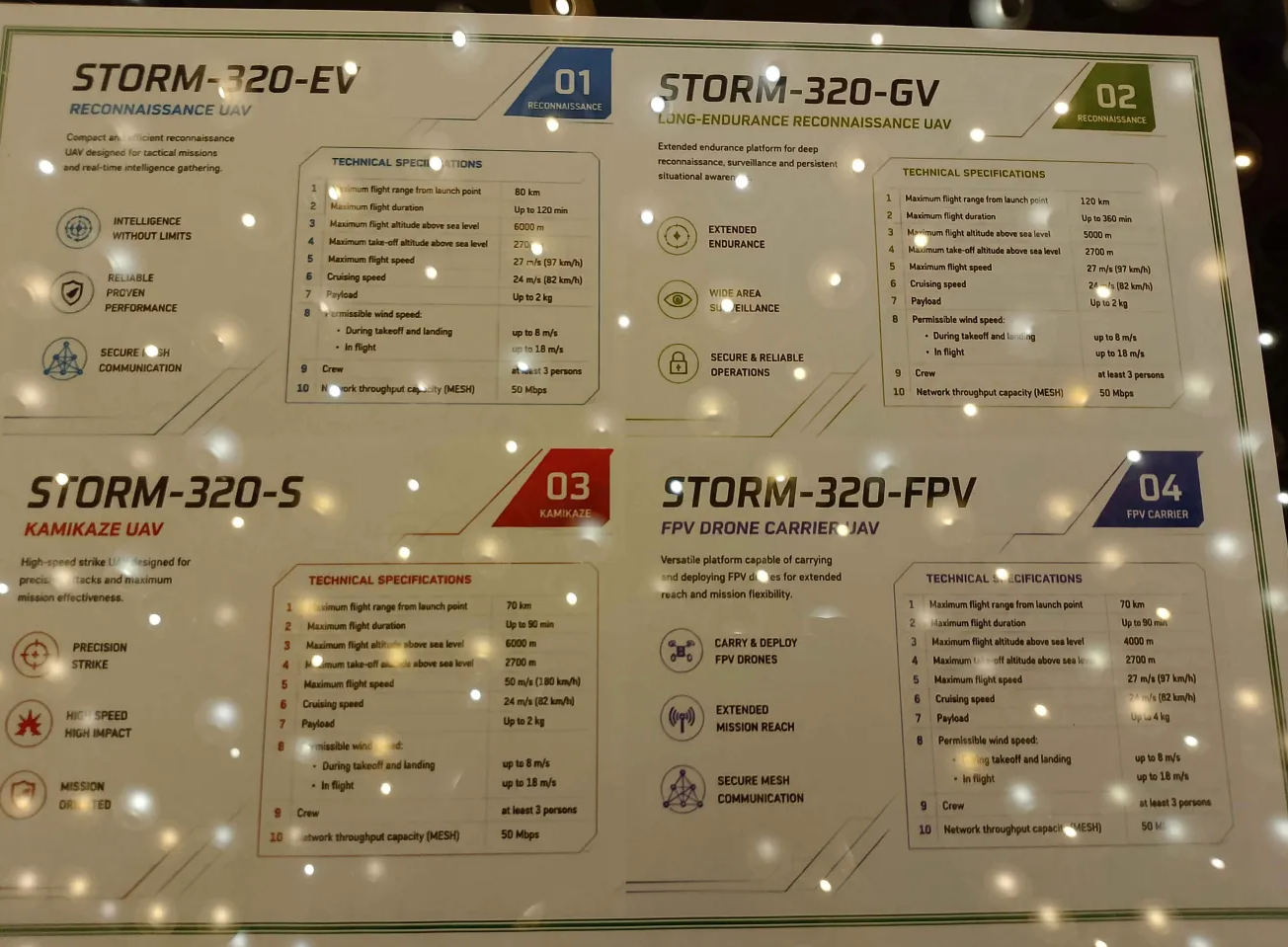
Specifications of STORM-320, seen during RISE EXPO

	Storm-320-EV	Storm-320-GV	Storm-320-S	Storm-320-FPV
Purpose	Reconnaissance UAV	Long-Endurance Reconnaissance UAV	Kamikaze UAV	FPV Drone Carrier UAV
Maximum flight range	80 km	120 km	70 km	
Maximum flight duration	Up to 120 min	Up to 360 min	Up to 90 min	
Maximum flight altitude above sea level	6000 m	5000 m	6000 m	4000 m
Maximum take-off altitude above sea level	2700 m			
Maximum flight speed	27 m/s (97 km/h)			
Cruising speed	24 m/s (82 km/h)			
Payload	Up to 2 kg			Up to 4 kg
Permissible wind speed:	8 to 18 m/s			
Crew	at least 3 persons			
Network trough capacity (MESH)	50 Mbps			
