= Avtobaza =

Russian ground-based mobile signals intelligence system

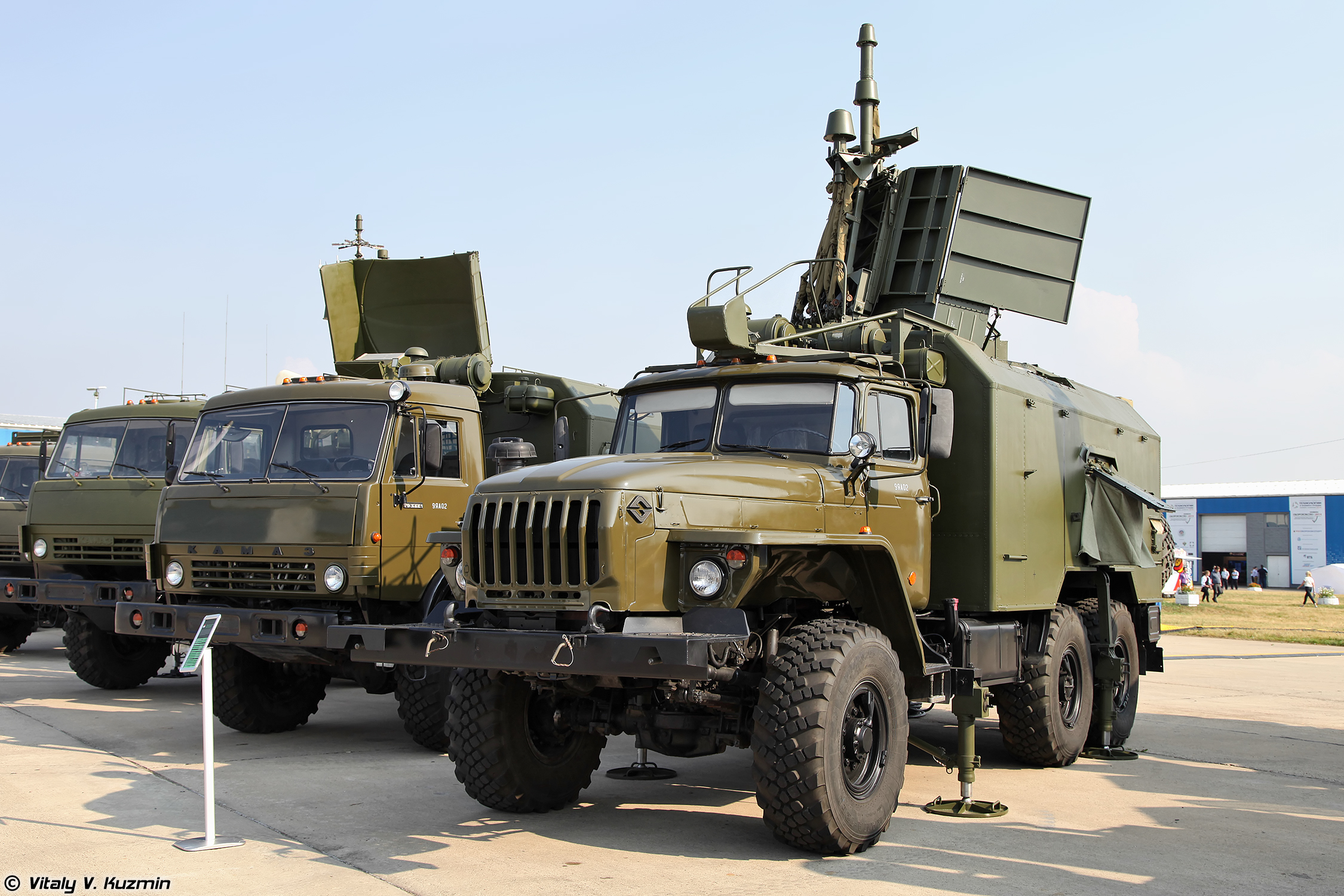
1L222 Avtobaza exhibited at the 2014 Engineering Technologies International Forum in Zhukovsky, Russia.

Kvant 1L222 Avtobaza is an ELINT system designed to detect side looking airborne radars, air-to-ground fire-control radars and low-altitude flight control radars, as well as to provide intelligence data for the 1L125M APUR.

== System composition ==
- equipment vehicle based on the Ural-43203 chassis with the K1.4320 van
- ED2x16-T230P-1VAS electric power generator in the K1.4320 van on the Ural 4310 chassis

The ELINT system displays on the TV screen acquired targets with data on their direction finding, angular coordinates (azimuth and elevation), radiation signal parameters (carrier frequency, duration, pulse repetition frequency) and radar type classification (sidelooking, fire control, low-altitude flight control radar). The APUR automated jamming control system is fed with target data (frequency band number according to frequency assignment of jamming systems, type of emitting radars and their angular coordinates) via cable at a range of up to 100 meters.

== Operational service ==
There are unconfirmed reports of the system being used in the capture of an RQ-170 UAV by the Iranian forces on 4 December 2011.

There are also unconfirmed reports of it being used by the Russian forces during the annexation of Crimea in March 2014 to overtake controls of an American drone.

== General system information ==
- Max ELINT range in kilometers: up to 150
- Radar detection frequency range in MHz: 8000–17544
- Operational envelope in degrees: 360 (in azimuth), 18/30 (in elevation for A, B/V Bands)
- Target detection/data transmission-to-APUR delay in microseconds: 500
- Number of emitting target bearings (at 15 tgt/s flow): up to 60
- Probability of radar type classification: 0.8 (with 1.0 being 100%)
- Into/out-of-action time in minutes: not more than 25
- Power consumption in kilowatts: not more than 12
- Crew: 4
