= Wz. 93 Pantera =

Polish camouflage scheme

wz. 93 Pantera
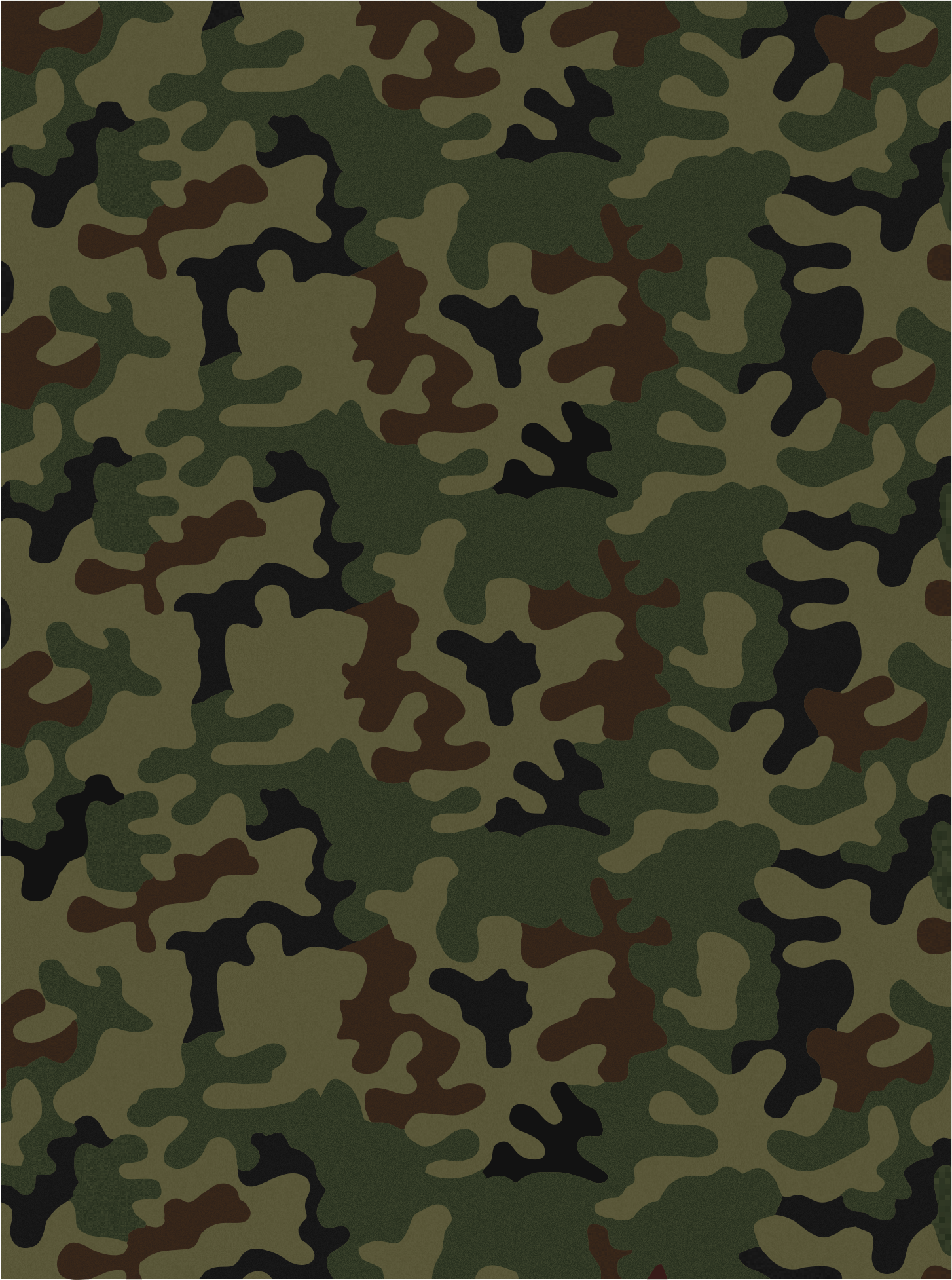
- Wz. 93 Pantera camouflage
- Type: Military camouflage patterns
- Place of origin: Poland

Service history
- In service: 1993–present
- Used by: See Users
- Wars: Operation Uphold Democracy; Bosnian War; Kosovo War; War in Afghanistan; Iraq War; EUFOR Tchad/RCA; Russo-Ukrainian War

Production history
- Designed: 1993
- Produced: 1993-present
- Variants: Woodland and desert version

The Wz. 93 Pantera (simply Wz. 93, Wzór 93, or Type 93 Panther) pattern is the standard camouflage of the Polish Armed Forces. It is the successor of the wz. 89 Puma pattern, and entered service in 1993. It differs from Puma in having stronger contrast, resulting in better disruptive camouflage.

== History ==
The camouflage pattern Wz. 93 Pantera was created for JW GROM. In 1993, it was introduced for all branches of the Polish Armed Forces, following President Lech Wałęsa appearing with GROM's camouflage on military exercises.

It first saw combat with Polish troops serving in UNPROFOR during the Yugoslav wars. The Wz. 93 Pantera camouflage is currently used by the entire Polish Armed Forces.

At the beginning of the 21st century, because of the involvement of the Polish Armed Forces in international operations in arid regions (Iraq and Afghanistan), it was decided to introduce a desert version of Pantera. This version keeps the same basic pattern but uses different colors.

In addition to uniforms, personal equipment such as plate carriers and backpacks or helmet covers have been issued in Pantera.

== Pattern ==
The Wz. 93 camouflage is designed on the basis of four colors that are a fairly good translation of the colors of areas covered with vegetation, which occurs at the Central European latitude. The first color, olive, is the background of the pattern. It is the brightest and the largest percentage. It is an imitation of grass, fresh young vegetation. The next group of stains in terms of size in the pattern are dark green stains. Their job is resembling the dark leaves of trees and shrubs. The brown stain imitates leaves, tree bark, forest litter or soil lying on the ground. The last, building the greatest contrast, black spots imitate shadows and dark elements of the forest environment. The geometries of the individual shapes are very similar, soft and do not create a clear vertical or horizontal direction.

Wz. 93 Pantera's desert variant (known as PL Desert), also used in the mountainous areas of Afghanistan or Iraq, is the same camouflage pattern with a different set of colors, adapted to the environment with a small amount of vegetation. The light color prevails here, reflecting the main component of the environment, i.e. sand. It is also important when reflecting light, because light colors of fabrics heat up much less than regular Wz.93 which is a reference to plant forms. In the desert version it is rather simply a mechanical translation of the same spots and has no reference to the forms occurring in the area of operation. Only the colors have been changed, leaving the same shapes.

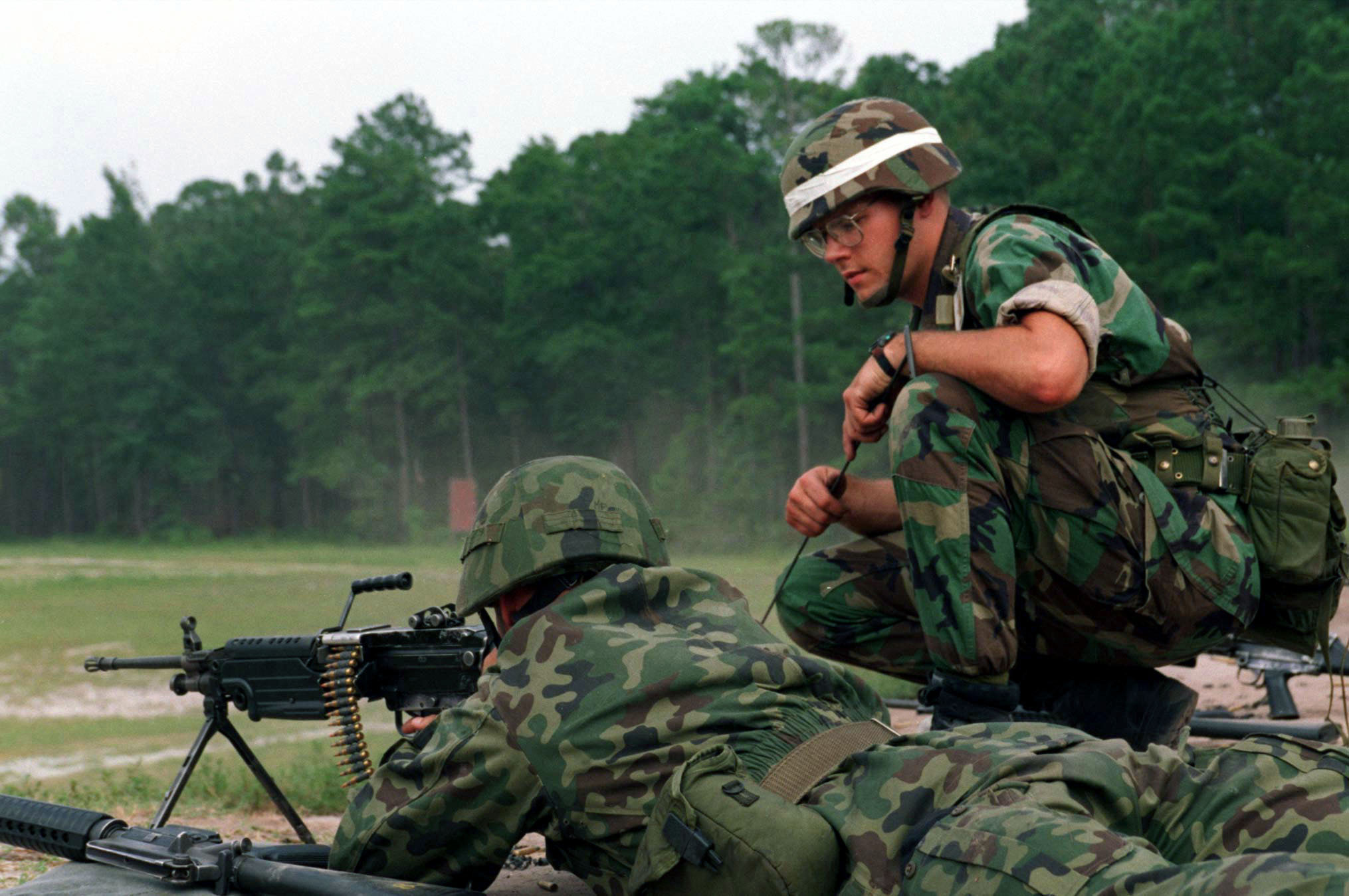
Comparison of Polish wz. 93 Pantera (left) and US Woodland camouflage.

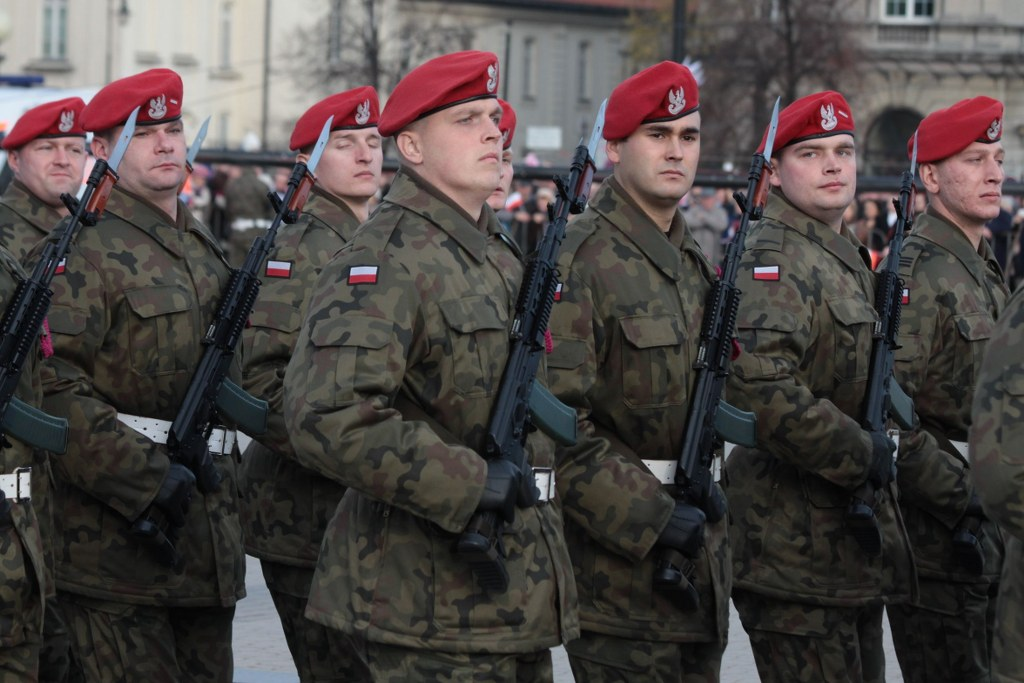
Polish Military Gendarmerie in 2012.

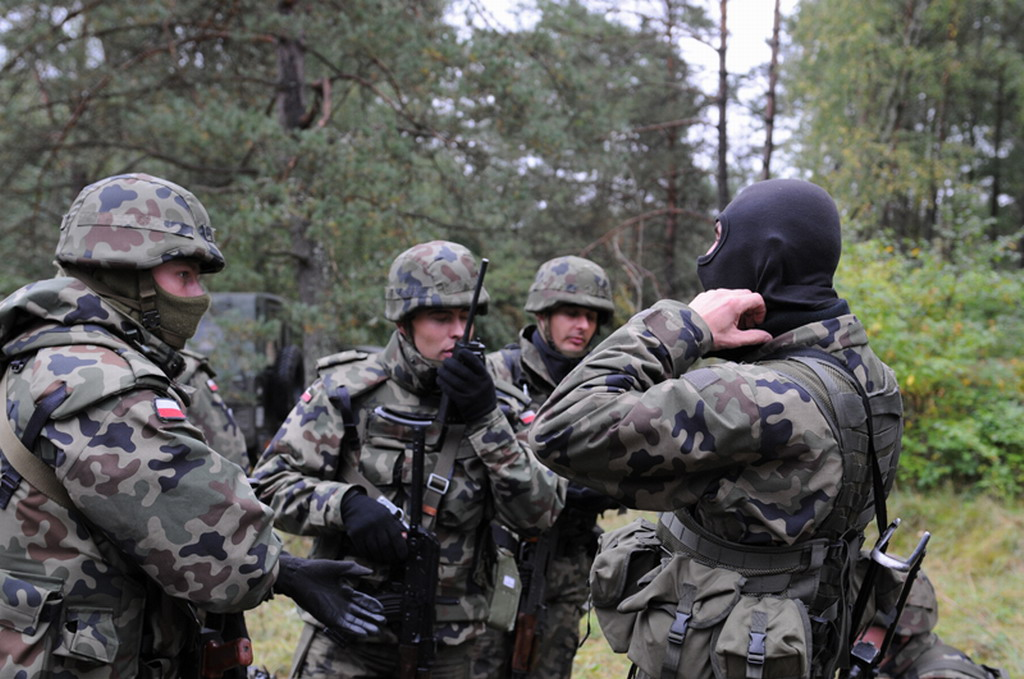
Polish soldiers in wz. 93 camo uniforms.

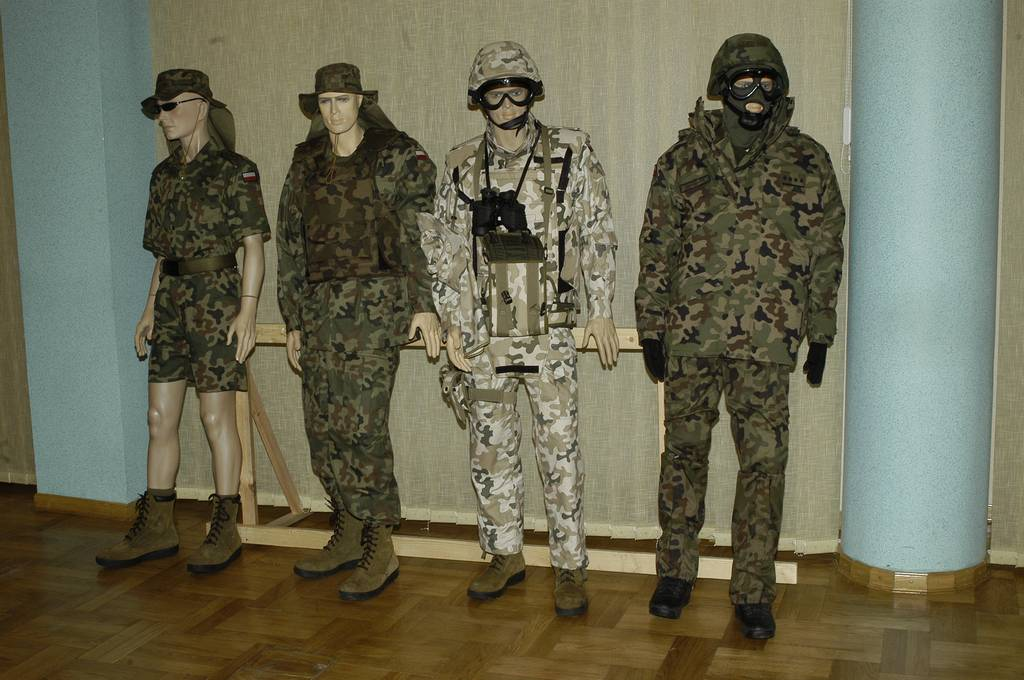
Presentation of uniforms for Polish soldiers going to Iraq, June 2003.

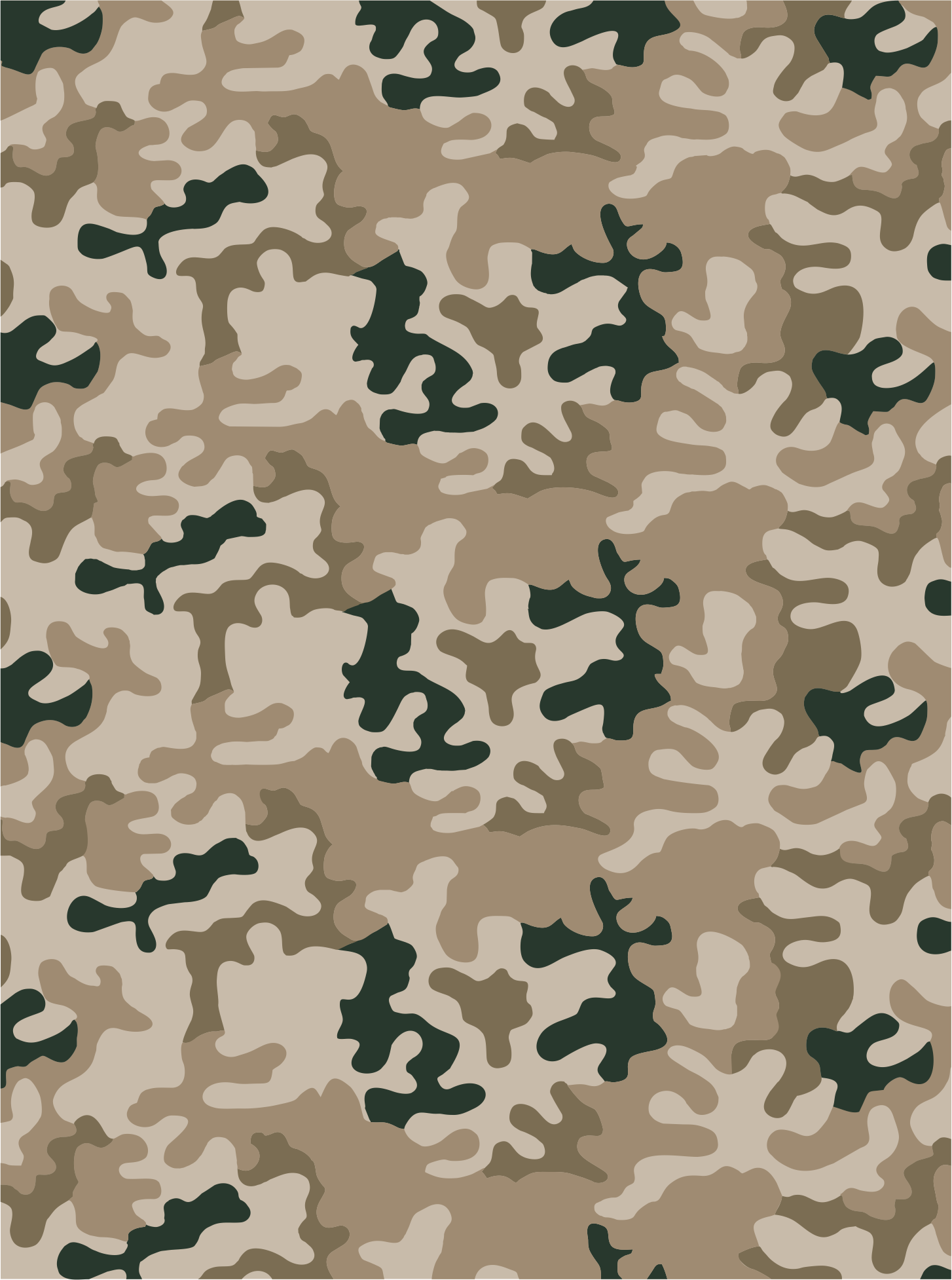
Desert variant of Wz.93 (Also known as "PL Desert")

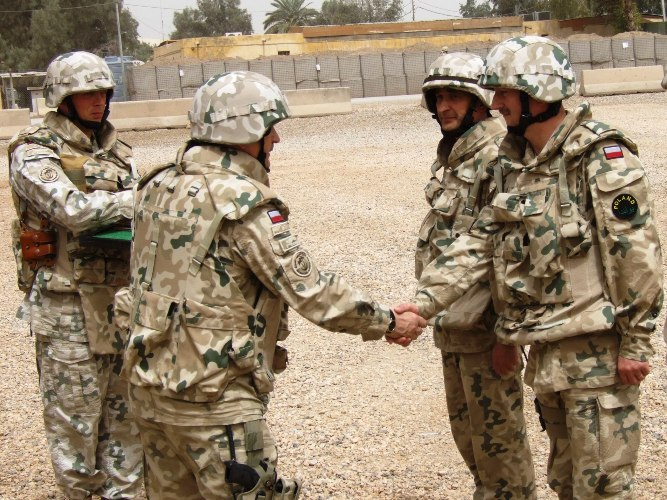
Desert version of the Polish Army uniform in wz. 93 Pantera camouflage pattern.

== Users ==
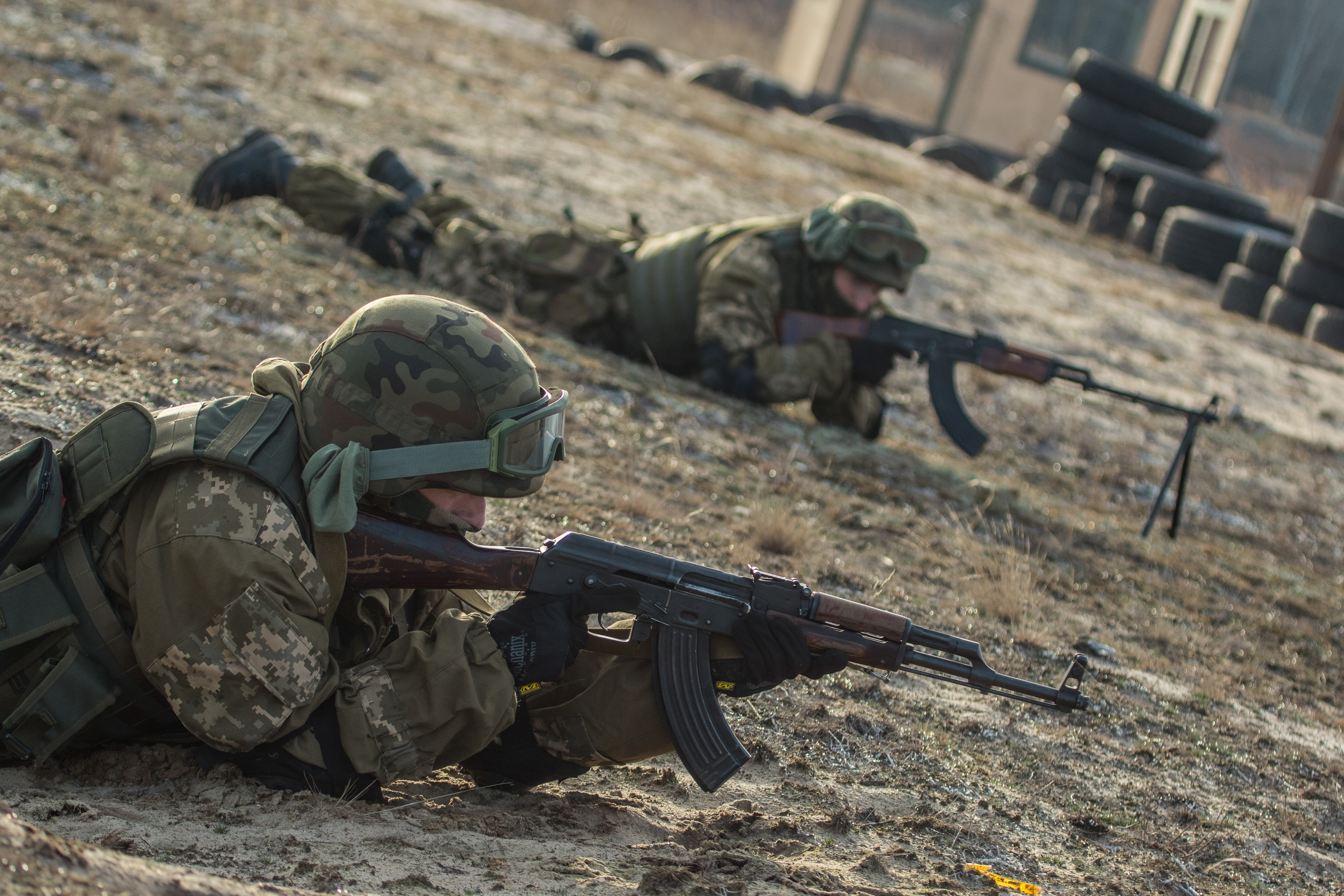
Wz. 93 Pantera camo in use by Ukrainian soldiers.

- Armenia: Used by Armenian Army as helmet covers for their wz. 93 helmets.
- Poland: Introduced into service in 1993, remains in use today. Also used by the Border Guard and the State Protection Service.
- Ukraine: Unknown numbers of uniforms and equipment in wz. 93 were handed over in 2014 and following the Russian invasion of Ukraine.
