= Military Institute of Armament Technology =

Polish scientific institution

Coordinates: 52.3050°N 21.1658°E

- Wojskowy Instytut Techniczny Uzbrojenia
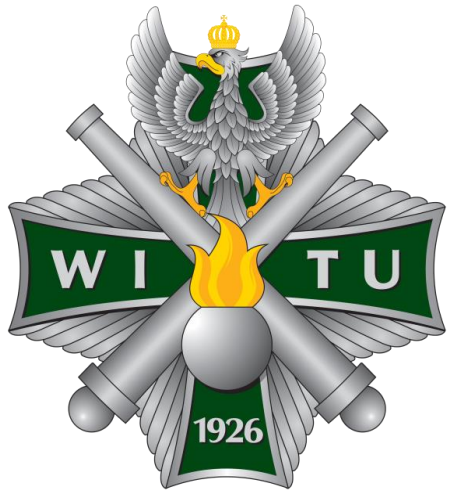
- distinctive unit insignia

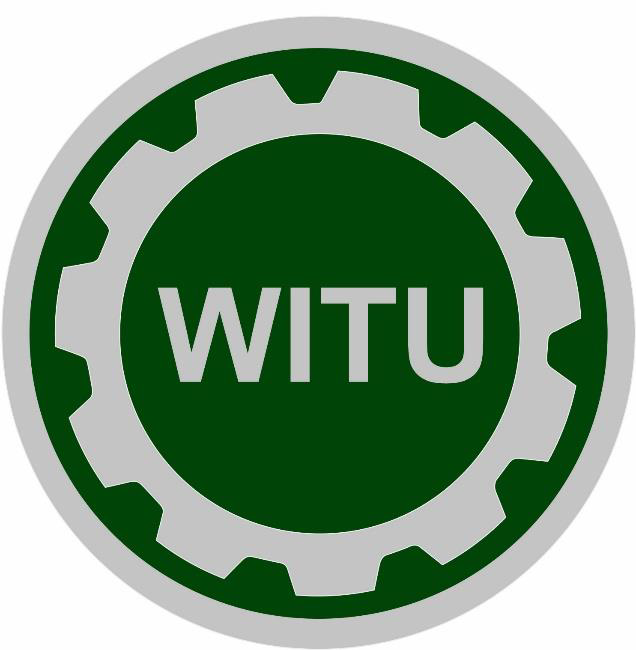
- shoulder sleeve insignia

Agency overview
- Formed: 1965
- Jurisdiction: Government of Poland
- Headquarters: ul. Prymasa Stefana Wyszyńskiego 7 05-220 Zielonka
- Agency executive: płk dr inż. Paweł Sweklej
- Parent department: Ministry of National Defence

Military Institute of Armament Technology (Polish: Wojskowy Instytut Techniczny Uzbrojenia; WITU) is a Polish scientific institution responsible for the research and development of new technologies for use by the military. It is based in Zielonka at the outskirts of Warsaw. Subordinate to the Ministry of National Defence, the institute is considered one of "central institutions", that is one of state-owned institutions essential to the functioning of the state.

== History ==
The institute was founded 25 March 1926 as the Institute for Artillery Research (Polish: Instytut Badań Artylerii). The new institution consisted of three departments dubbed centres: Centre for Field Studies (later renamed to Centre for Ballistic Studies) in Zielonka, Centre for Laboratory Research and the Technical Bureau. In 1935 the institute was renamed to Institute of Armament Technology (Polish: Instytut Techniczny Uzbrojenia; ITU). As one of the principal centres for research and development of weapons, the ITU was responsible for a number of successful designs introduced in the Polish Army of the epoch. Among them were the Wz. 35 anti-tank rifle, the Szabla wz. 34 sabre and the Kbsp wz. 1938M semi-automatic rifle. It was also responsible for modifications and customisations of roughly 200 types of foreign-made weapons. In the thirties col. Stanisław Witkowski was the commandant of the Military Institute of Armament Technology.

After World War II the institute was recreated. After several reorganisations, in 1965 it was renamed to its modern name. Among the best-known weapons designed by the WITU were PM-84 Glauberyt SMG, numerous pistols including P-83 Wanad and WIST-94, RPG-76 Komar AT grenade launcher and AHS Krab SP howitzer, as well as most post-war Polish helmet designs, including the Hełm wz. 2005 currently used by the Polish Army. It also customised numerous types of foreign (mostly Soviet) technology for local production, including the ZU-23-2 AA autocannon.

== See also ==
- Agency for Defense Development - South Korea
- Defense Advanced Research Projects Agency - United States
- Defence Industry Agency - Turkey
- Defence Research and Development Organisation - India
- Defence Technology Institute - Thailand
- National Chung-Shan Institute of Science and Technology - Taiwan
- Rafael Advanced Defense Systems - Israel
- Swedish Defence Research Agency - Sweden
