= 1994 Brooklyn Bridge shooting =

Shooting attack on Jewish Americans

Coordinates: 40.707°N 73.999°W

- Part of spillover of the Israeli–Palestinian conflict
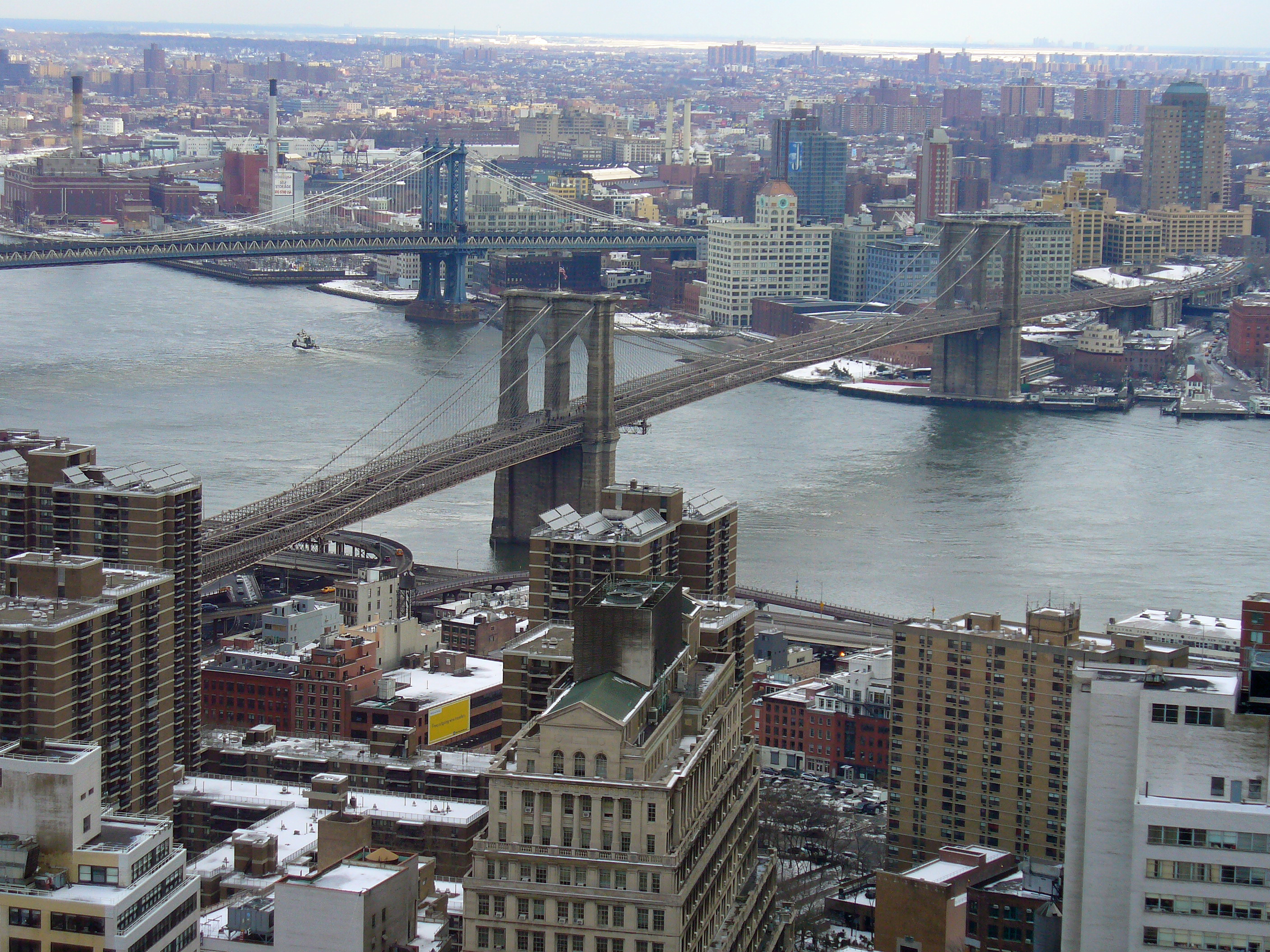
- The Brooklyn Bridge, where the shooting took place. Photographed in February 2007
- Location: New York City, United States
- Date: March 1, 1994
- Target: Jews
- Attack type: Islamic fundamentalist terrorism, Mass shooting, hate crime
- Weapons: .380-caliber Cobray MAC-11 machine pistol; 9mm Glock 17 pistol; 12-gauge Armsel Striker shotgun
- Deaths: 1
- Injuries: 3
- Perpetrator: Rashid Baz
- Motive: Anti-Semitic; Revenge for CoP Massacre

On March 1, 1994, Lebanese-born Rashid Baz shot at a van of 15 Chabad-Lubavitch Orthodox Jewish students who were traveling on the Brooklyn Bridge in New York City, killing one and injuring three others. Initially considered a road rage incident, in December 2000, this shooting was reclassified as a terrorist attack.

== Incident ==
In the attack, Baz shot at a van in which 15 Chabad-Lubavitch Orthodox Jewish students were crossing the Brooklyn Bridge. He used a Cobray MAC-11 automatic pistol to strafe the van, and a Glock 17 9mm semi-automatic pistol to shoot at students. He also had a 12-gauge Armsel Striker shotgun in his trunk.

Four students were shot. The two most seriously wounded included Ari Halberstam, a 16-year-old, who died five days later from a shot to the head. The other student, Israeli-born Nachum Sasonkin, was also shot in the head and suffered permanent major speech impediments.

Amir Abudaif, an auto mechanic, reported the incident to the police. During the arrest, Baz was also found to be in possession of anti-Jewish literature, a .380-caliber semiautomatic pistol, a stun gun, a bulletproof vest, and two 50-round ammunition magazines. Initially, Baz claimed a traffic dispute led him to commit the shootings, and the Federal Bureau of Investigation initially classified the case as road rage. Witnesses testified that on the day of the shooting Baz had attended "a raging anti-Semitic sermon" at the Islamic Society of Bay Ridge.

Baz pleaded not guilty by reason of insanity. His defense team also offered the theory that Baz was reacting to events in the Middle East, specifically the recent attack on the Cave of the Patriarchs in Hebron by an extremist Israeli settler that had occurred less than a week before.

The jury rejected both defenses, and Baz was found guilty of second degree murder and 14 additional counts of attempted murder in New York Supreme Court on December 1, 1994. He was sentenced to 141 years to life in prison.

== Dead and wounded ==
=== Dead ===
Ari Halberstam, a yeshiva student, was killed in the attack. He was the son of Devorah Halberstam and David Halberstam, members of distinguished families associated with the Chabad-Lubavitch movement. He was raised under the personal supervision of the seventh Lubavitcher Rebbe, Menachem Mendel Schneerson. The Halberstam family had ties to the Rebbe as Ari's father, Rabbi Chesed Halberstam (1951-2025), worked as a butler and personal manager to the Rebbe. The family descends from Rabbi Chaim Halberstam, founder of the Sanz dynasty of Rebbes.

On March 1, 1994, Ari Halberstam was visiting the ailing Rebbe at the Manhattan Eye, Ear and Throat Hospital, and was returning to his Brooklyn home via the Brooklyn Bridge. On the entrance ramp to the bridge, gunman Rashid Baz opened fire on the van, which also carried more than a dozen other Hasidic students. Baz was equipped with a submachine gun, two 9mm guns, and a "street sweeper" shotgun. Baz pursued the van across the bridge as he fired in three separate bursts, spraying both sides of the van, before disappearing into traffic. During the shooting spree, the gunman reportedly shouted in Arabic "Kill the Jews," expressing revenge for the terrorist massacre of 29 Muslim worshipers at the Cave of the Patriarchs in Hebron by Baruch Goldstein four days prior. The attack critically wounded two of the young men and injured two others.

Halberstam was rushed to St. Vincent's Hospital and was the most severely wounded, having been shot in the head by Baz. As a result of the massive brain injuries, Halberstam died on March 6, five days after the shooting.

As the funeral procession took place on Eastern Parkway, outside the central Lubavitcher synagogue at 770 Eastern Parkway, some 10,000 mourners were in attendance. More than 250 police officers were on hand to maintain safety. Halberstam was buried in the Montefiore Cemetery in Queens.

=== Wounded ===
Nachum Sossonkin survived but suffered permanent brain damage.

Levi Wilhelm survived a bullet to the abdomen.

Yaakov Schapiro has minor injuries to one hand and a minor gunshot wound to the head.

=== Legacy ===
Among the items named in memory of Ari Halberstam include:

- Ari Halberstam Memorial Ramp, the entrance ramp from the FDR Drive to the Brooklyn Bridge, on which the act of terrorism occurred.
- The Jewish Children's Museum, dedicated in memory of Ari Halberstam.
- Ari's Law: requiring a license in order to possess a gun kit from which a firearm could be produced.

== Convictions ==
Bassam Reyati, uncle of Baz and the owner of the car, was convicted of concealing evidence, and was sentenced to five years of probation and a $1,000 fine on October 16, 1996. Hilal Abd Al-Aziz Muhammad, owner of the car repair shop Baz used to hide the damage to his car, was convicted of concealing evidence and hindering prosecution. He was sentenced to five years of probation on May 17, 1995. Albert Jeanniton was convicted for illegally selling one of the guns obtained by Baz. In 2000, U.S. Attorney for the Southern District of New York (Manhattan) Mary Jo White and the Federal Bureau of Investigation re-classified the attack as "the crimes of a terrorist."

Rashid Baz's defense team portrayed him as suffering from post-traumatic stress disorder due to his childhood exposure to violence during the Lebanese Civil War. They argued further that Baz's actions were triggered by Cave of the Patriarchs massacre of 29 people in Hebron. The jury rejected this argument, and on December 1, 1994, Baz was convicted on one count of murder, 14 counts of attempted murder, and one count of criminal use of a firearm. On January 18, 1995, judge Harold Rothwax sentenced Baz to 141 years to life in prison. Baz was initially imprisoned at the Auburn Correctional Facility in upstate New York and later transferred to the Clinton Correctional Facility.

Despite the conviction of Baz, the Halberstam family and others wanted the case reclassified as a terrorist attack and wanted a further investigation to probe any terrorist links to Baz. On August 26, 1999, the United States Department of Justice and FBI agreed to open an investigation into Baz. The investigation did not yield any new leads connected to terrorist organizations but the Justice Department did formally reclassify the incident as an act of terrorism. In his confession in 2007, Baz said, "I only shot them because they were Jewish."

In July 2026, the Department of Justice sent a letter to Halberstam’s mother, saying that if the murder happened today, it would be investigated as a federal hate crime.

== See also ==
- Crown Heights riot
- Xenophobia
- Religious intolerance
- Meir Kahane, an American-bred Orthodox Jewish rabbi, activist and chairman of Kach
  - Kach — a far-right Orthodox fundamentalist party and terror group, led by Kahane.
  - Assassination of Meir Kahane
  - Binyamin (Baruch) Capel Goldstein, a physician, JDL activist and member of the banned Kach movement.
- Cave of the Patriarchs massacre
- 1997 Empire State Building shooting
- 2000 New York terror attack
- 2009 Bronx terrorism plot
- List of attacks on Jewish institutions in the United States
