= SIONICS =

American firearm suppressor manufacturer

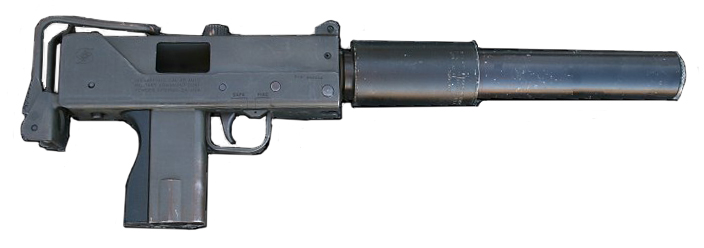
A SIONICS suppressor attached to a MAC-10

SIONICS (an acronym for Studies in the Operational Negation of Insurgents and Counter-Subversion) was an American company producing firearm suppressors. It was founded in the 1960s by Mitchell WerBell III, a former OSS officer.

== History ==
The company was originally formed to design suppressors for the M16 rifle. Later, WerBell began work on designs for a low-cost, efficient suppressor for machine guns.

In 1967 WerBell partnered with Gordon B. Ingram, inventor of the MAC-10 submachine gun. They added Werbell's suppressor to Ingram's SMG (submachine gun) and attempted to market it to the U.S. military for use in the Vietnam War. The suppressor was the M14SS-1, designed for the M14 rifle, and forty suppressors were sent unofficially to the 9th Infantry Division in Vietnam during early 1969 for combat evaluation. An undisclosed number were procured under ENSURE Number 360.1, but the suppressor was not adopted officially.

To obtain capital for manufacturing, Werbell solicited 29 investors, each for 7 million dollars, into a holding company called Quantum Ordnance Bankers. They created a manufacturing corporation called Military Armament Corporation, and merged it with Quantum and SIONICS. The efforts to sell to the military failed and Werbell lost control of the company.

== Other companies ==
SIONICS Weapon Systems, which manufactures AR-15 type rifles in Tucson, Arizona, has no relationship to the original SIONICS beyond the name.
