= Roger Elwood =

American novelist

- Born: January 13, 1943; New Jersey, U.S.
- Died: February 2, 2007 (aged 64); U.S.
- Occupations: Author; editor

Roger Elwood (January 13, 1943 – February 2, 2007) was an American science fiction author and editor, who edited a large number of anthologies and collections for a variety of publishers during the early to mid-1970s.

== Biography ==
Born and raised in southern New Jersey, Roger Elwood started his professional writing career soon after graduating from high school.

Elwood edited two magazines about wrestling, The Big Book of Wrestling and Official Wrestling Guide, on a contract basis during 1971–72 for Jalart House, an Arizona publisher, and regularly photographed matches (photographs were more important than text for wrestling magazines). He became a regular with locker room access at some shows on the East Coast, which might seem to contradict rumours that he had become disillusioned with wrestling when it came to his attention that some professional wrestling matches were fixed. This period produced some fictional confessional stories (e.g. "I Killed a Man in the Ring") that Elwood claimed were based on "a blending of interviews". He left the job abruptly between late 1972 and early 1973, telling writers the wrestling magazines were too much work for too little compensation.

Elwood was published by four different publishers during his first six years as an SF anthologist. During the next few years he would contract with more than a dozen other publishers to produce many dozens of individual books and two anthology series, the four-book Continuum and two-book Frontiers. The Encyclopedia of Science Fiction observes that "At one time it was estimated that Roger Elwood alone constituted about one quarter of the total market for SF short stories."

About the time the SF anthology market was decreasing, Elwood began working for Laser Books, an ultimately unsuccessful attempt by romance publishing giant Harlequin Books to systematize and regularize SF into a uniform series of novels by diverse authors. He then effectively quit ordinary science fiction/fantasy during the late 1970s, becoming a prolific writer of Christian-based novels during the 1990s, with more than thirty novels published during that decade.

Elwood's biography on the Fantastic Fiction website omits mention of his work concerning ordinary science fiction/fantasy and identifies him as a Writer-in-Residence (or occasionally a "professor of literature") at a Bible college in the mid-western USA. The biography also claims that "12 of his novels have won Excellence in Media awards for best book of the year", although the Silver Angels award website includes only a general "Print" category, and does not list Elwood's name.

== Criticisms ==
Elwood's work as a genre anthology editor during the mid-1970s is not without its detractors, whose criticisms range from professional to ad hominem; James Nicoll has noted that Elwood's "capacity to produce anthologies at high speed was not, alas, matched with an ability to produce interesting anthologies", as well as the possibility that "readers, having read a few unremarkable Elwood anthologies, were reluctant to buy more".

A review of Elwood's 1976 anthology Six Science Fiction Plays in the Star Trek fan magazine Enterprise Incidents remarked that except for the inclusion of the original teleplay of the episode "The City on the Edge of Forever" by Harlan Ellison, the book was "another excursion into mediocrity by Roger Elwood."

=== Quality ===
Amongst other criticisms, which she suggests "are more conjectural, but not easily dismissed", Nielsen Hayden nominates "the quality of the books themselves". She describes Elwood's theme anthologies as "carelessly edited" and "low-grade", although she allows that "some of Elwood's collections were quite decent," and that "all of them featured some good writers and good stories."

The following are examples of peer recognition accorded to some of the stories printed in Elwood's anthologies (source: the Internet Speculative Fiction Database):

- The short story "Forever and Amen" by Robert Bloch, from Elwood's 1972 anthology And Walk Now Gently Through The Fire and Other Science Fiction Stories was chosen by Forrest J. Ackerman for inclusion in his Best Science Fiction for 1973 compilation.
- The 1973 anthology Future City included "The World as Will and Wallpaper" by R. A. Lafferty, which was reprinted by Terry Carr in The Best Science Fiction of the Year #3 (1974), "The Undercity" by Dean Koontz, which has been re-anthologized twice (in 1977 by Martin H. Greenberg and Joseph D. Olander in Criminal Justice Through Science Fiction, and in 1997 by Ric Alexander in Cyber-Killers), and "Getting Across" by Robert Silverberg which has also been re-anthologized twice (in 1986 by Greenberg et al. in Computer Crimes and Capers and in 1997 by Waugh and Greenberg in Sci-Fi Private Eye). The Future City anthology itself was reprinted in the United Kingdom by Sphere Books in 1976.
- Robert Silverberg's "The Wind and the Rain", from Elwood's 1973 anthology Saving Worlds, was reprinted by Harry Harrison and Brian Aldiss in their Best SF: 1973 anthology.
- "After King Kong Fell" by Philip José Farmer, from Elwood's 1973 anthology Omega, was nominated for a Nebula Award in 1974, and reprinted by Harrison and Aldiss in Best SF: 1974.
- Elwood's 1973 anthology Showcase contains Silverberg's novelette Breckenridge and the Continuum, which was chosen by Terry Carr for The Best Science Fiction of the Year #3 (1974), as well as "The Childhood of the Human Hero" by Carol Emshwiller, which was included in Nebula Award Stories 9, edited by Kate Wilhelm.
- Thomas F. Monteleone's short story "Breath's a Ware That Will Not Keep", from Elwood's 1975 anthology Dystopian Visions, was nominated for a Nebula award in 1976.
- No less than twenty of the stories chosen by Barry N. Malzberg for inclusion in his collection The Best of Barry N. Malzberg (1976) were first published in one or other of Elwood's original anthologies.

=== Professionalism ===
Elwood is reported to have underpaid authors. Additionally, Teresa Nielsen Hayden discusses speculation about the financial details of some of Elwood's projects "that by all indications should have had generous budgets" but were "peculiarly long on authors who had slight or nonexistent publishing credentials outside of Roger Elwood projects."

Elwood's eight-volume young adult hardcover Lerner SF Library (1974), with three or four stories per volume, includes stories from three authors whose only recorded sale, according to the Internet Speculative Fiction Database, was to that book; two more authors who only ever sold stories to Roger Elwood; and one whose only first sale was to Roger Elwood, but who had the story republished elsewhere.

SF hardcovers were relatively uncommon during the 1970s and the stories were supposedly original commissions, so Nielsen Hayden believes it is reasonable to assume that this was a well-funded project. Normally the entire advance for an anthology is paid to the anthologist, who then purchases story rights out of his or her own pocket, retaining any unspent advance money.

Given the availability of experienced short fiction writers at the time, Elwood's choice of inexperienced authors aroused suspicions.

The Lerner SF Library also contains two stories by Earl and Otto Binder, and a third story by Otto alone. Given that Earl and Otto Binder ceased to co-author stories in 1955, and that Earl died in 1965 and Otto in 1974, it seems unlikely any of these stories was a commissioned work.

=== Effect on the industry ===
Nielsen Hayden reports that, prior to Elwood's involvement with the market, anthologies and collections were very popular with readers, and were considered by the publishing industry to be "a surer bet than novels". She accuses Elwood of "singlehandedly breaking the story collection/anthology market". By "wreck[ing] the readers' faith in collections" she says, Elwood "squandered industry credibility accumulated over decades by better anthologists". Anthologies and story collections, she suggests, became "a hard sell".

The idea that Elwood's effect has been a long-term one, as Nielsen Hayden maintains, is difficult to maintain considering the continuing high numbers of anthologies published annually.

=== Publishers ===
Publishing houses which published Roger Elwood's anthologies:

- 1964: Paperback Library
- 1965: Paperback Library
- 1966: Holt, Rinehart and Winston
- 1967: Tower
- 1968: Tower
- 1969: MacFadden-Bartell (3x)
- 1970: MacFadden-Bartell
- 1971: ---
- 1972: Avon, Chilton, Fleming H. Revell, MacFadden-Bartell
- 1973: Avon (2x), Concordia, Doubleday, Fawcett Gold Medal Books, Follett, Franklin Watts, Harper & Row, Macmillan Publishers (2x), Manor, Rand McNally (2x), Random House, Trident, Walker, Whitman
- 1974: Aurora, Berkley/Putnam (3x), Curtis, Dodd, Mead and Company, Doubleday, Franklin Watts, John Knox Press, Julian Messner, Lerner SF Library (8x), Pocket Books, Rand McNally, Thomas Nelson, Trident
- 1975: Berkley, Berkley/Putnam, Bobbs-Merrill, Evans, Follett, Manor, Prentice Hall, Warner
- 1976: Archway, Pocket, Washington Square Press
- 1977: Bobbs-Merrill Company

== Bibliography ==
=== Short work ===
Elwood's Fantastic Fiction biography claims that he has sold "a thousand articles and a few short stories" to publications including Ladies Home Companion, Mike Shayne's Mystery Magazine, Edgar Wallace Mystery Magazine, Photoplay, Grit and Weekly Reader.

=== Anthologies ===
- Alien Worlds (1964)
- Invasion of the Robots (1965)
- Strange Signposts (1966) (with Sam Moskowitz)
- The Time Curve (1968) (with Sam Moskowitz)
- Alien Earth: And Other Stories (1969)
- The Little Monsters (1969) (with Vic Ghidalia)
- Other Worlds, Other Times (1969) (with Sam Moskowitz)
- Horror Hunters (1971) (with Vic Ghidalia)
- And Walk Now Gently Through The Fire: And Other Science Fiction Stories (1972)
- Young Demons (1972) (with Vic Ghidalia)
- Beware the Beasts (1973) (with Vic Ghidalia)
- Demon Kind (1973)
- Future Quest (1973)
- Way Out (1973)
- The Berserkers (1973)
- Future City (1973)
- The Other Side Of Tomorrow (1973)
- Monster Tales: Vampires Werewolves And Things (1973)
- Children of Infinity: Original Science Fiction Stories for Young Readers (1973)
- Androids, Time Machines, and Blue Giraffes: A Panorama of Science Fiction (1973)
- Flame Tree Planet: And Other Stories (1973)
- Saving Worlds (1973) (with Virginia Kidd)
- Showcase (1973)
- Ten Tomorrows (1973)
- Omega (1974)
- Crisis: Ten Original Stories of Science Fiction (1974)
- Chronicles of a Comer: And Other Religious Science Fiction Stories (1974)
- The Killer Plants: And Other Stories (1974)
- Night of the Sphinx: and Other Stories (1974)
- Strange Gods (1974)
- Survival from Infinity: Original Science Fiction Stories for Young Readers (1974)
- The Far Side of Time (1974)
- Future Kin: Eight Science Fiction Stories (1974)
- Horror Tales: Spirits, Spells and the Unknown (1974)
- The Learning Maze: and Other Science Fiction (1974)
- The Wounded Planet (1974)
- Dystopian Visions (1975)
- Future Corruption (1975)
- The Gifts Of Asti: And Other Stories of Science Fiction (1975)
- Tomorrow: New Worlds of Science Fiction (1975)
- Epoch (1975)
- Six Science Fiction Plays (1975)
- The Fifty-meter Monsters: And Other Horrors (1976)
- Visions of Tomorrow (1976)
- Futurelove (1977)
- Science Fiction Tales (1978)
- Spine-Chillers: Unforgettable Tales of Terror (1978) (with Howard Goldsmith)
- More Science Fiction Tales (1978)

==== Anthology series ====
Frontiers:

- Frontiers 1: Tomorrow's Alternatives (1973)
- Frontiers 2: The New Mind (1973)

Continuum: Each Continuum volume contained eight short stories: seven comprising four-episode series by the authors Poul Anderson, Philip José Farmer, Anne McCaffrey, Chad Oliver, Edgar Pangborn, Thomas N. Scortia, and Gene Wolfe. (The stories by Pangborn are based in the world of his novel Davy, but at different times within that world's fictional history.) The eighth story in each volume is part of a rotating author series started by Dean R. Koontz.

- Continuum 1 (1974)
- Continuum 2 (1974)
- Continuum 3 (1974)
- Continuum 4 (1975)

=== As author ===
==== Novel series ====
Angelwalk:

1. Angelwalk (1988)
2. Fallen Angel (1990)
3. Steadfast Guardian Angel (1992)
- Darien: Guardian Angel Of Jesus (1994)
- The Angelwalk Trilogy: Angelwalk / Fallen Angel / Stedfast (omnibus) (1995)
- Darien's Angelwalk for Children (1995)
- Angels in Atlantic City (1998)
- Wendy's Phoenix (1999)
- Where Angels Dare (1999)
- On Holy Ground (2001)

Bartlett Brothers:

- Sudden Fear (1991)
- Terror Cruise (1991)
- Forbidden River (1991)
- The Frankenstein Project (1991)
- Disaster Island (1992)
- Nightmare at Skull Junction (1992)

Oss Chronicles:

1. Wolf's Lair (1993)
2. Deadly Sanction (1993)
3. Code Name Bloody Winter (1993)

Without The Dawn:

1. How Soon The Serpent (1997)
2. Valley of the Shadow (1997)
3. The Judas Factor (1997)
4. Bright Phoenix (1997)

==== Novels ====
- Long Night Of Waiting (1974)
- Remnant (1989)
- The Christening (1989)
- The Wandering (1990)
- Children of the Furor (1990)
- Dwellers (1990)
- Sorcerers of Sodom (1991)
- Dark Knight (1991)
- Wise One (1991)
- Soaring : An Odyssey of the Soul (1992)
- Maggie's Song (1993)
- Circle of Deception (1993)
- The Road to Masada (1994)
- Shawn Hawk: A Novel of the 21st Century (1995)
- Act of Sacrifice: Vol. 3 (1997)
- Ashes of Paradise (1997) (which explains how to reconcile Confederate slaveholding and Christian ideals)
- Stephen the Martyr (1998)

==== Other ====
- The Dukes of Hazzard Scrapbook

== See also ==
- Sam Moskowitz
- Vic Ghidalia
- The book Science Fiction and Market Realities, proceedings of the conference from an Eaton Conference, edited by George Slusser, Gary Westfahl, and Eric S. Rabkin, Athens : University of Georgia Press, c1996, ISBN 0-8203-1726-8, has one or more essays that discuss the effect of Elwood on the science fiction market in some detail.
