= Automatic pistol =

Automatic pistol may refer to:

- Semi-automatic pistol, a type of auto-loading handgun that can be fired in semi-automatic mode, firing one cartridge for each pull of the trigger.
- Machine pistol, a handgun-style, magazine-fed and self-loading firearm, capable of fully automatic or burst fire, and chambered for pistol cartridges
