= MAC-10 =

American machine pistol

Military Armament Corporation M10
- M-10 chambered in .45 ACP, with magazine
- Type: Machine pistol Submachine gun
- Place of origin: United States

Service history
- In service: 1970–present
- Used by: See Users
- Wars: Vietnam War; The Troubles; Cambodian Civil War; Lebanese Civil War; Salvadoran Civil War; Crips-Bloods gang war; Miami drug war; Invasion of Grenada

Production history
- Designer: Gordon Ingram
- Designed: 1964
- Manufacturer: Military Armament Corporation
- Unit cost: $120
- Produced: 1970–1973

Specifications
- Mass: 2.84 kg (6.3 lb) empty without a suppressor
- Length: 269 mm (10.6 in) with stock removed; 295 mm (11.6 in) with stock retracted; 548 millimetres (1 foot 9.6 inches) with stock extended; 545 millimetres (1 foot 9.5 inches) with stock retracted w/suppressor; 798 millimetres (2 feet 7.4 inches) with stock extended with suppressor
- Barrel length: 146 mm (5.7 in)
- Width: 50 mm (2.0 in) without a suppressor; 54 mm (2.1 in) with suppressor
- Cartridge: .45 ACP (11.43×23mm); 9×19mm Parabellum
- Action: Straight blowback
- Rate of fire: 1,200–1500 rounds/min. (9mm); 1,090 rounds/min. (45 ACP)
- Muzzle velocity: 366 metres per second (1,200 ft/s) for 9mm; 280 metres per second (920 ft/s) for .45 ACP
- Effective firing range: 50 meters (.45 ACP); 70 meters (9×19mm Parabellum)
- Maximum firing range: 100 meters (for .45 ACP)
- Feed system: 30-round detachable box magazine (.45 ACP); 32-round detachable box magazine (9×19mm)
- Sights: Iron sights

The Military Armament Corporation Model 10, officially abbreviated as "M10" or "M-10", and more commonly known as the MAC-10, is a compact, blowback operated machine pistol/submachine gun that was developed by Gordon Ingram in 1964. It is chambered in either .45 ACP or 9mm. A two-stage suppressor by Sionics was designed for the MAC-10, which not only abates the noise created but makes it easier to control on full automatic (although it also makes the gun far less compact and concealable).

Military Armament Corporation never used the "MAC-10" nomenclature in its catalogues or sales literature, but "MAC-10" is frequently used by Title II dealers, gun writers, and collectors. For a decade, the semi-automatic pistol version of the weapon was forbidden in the U.S. under the assault weapons ban enacted by Congress in 1994.

== Design ==
The MAC-10 is built predominantly from steel stampings. A notched cocking handle protrudes from the top of the receiver, and turning the handle 90° locks the bolt, and acts as an indicator the weapon is unable to fire. The MAC-10 has a telescoping bolt, which wraps around the rear face of the barrel. This allows a more compact weapon and balances the weight of the weapon over the pistol grip, where the magazine is located. The MAC-10 fires from an open bolt, and the light weight of the bolt results in a rapid rate of fire. In addition, this design incorporates a built-in feed ramp as part of the trigger guard (a new concept at the time) and, to save on cost, the magazine design was recycled from the M3 Grease Gun. The barrel is threaded to accept a suppressor, which works by reducing the discharge's sound without attempting to reduce the speed of the bullet. The .45 ACP models are well-suited for this, as most .45 loads are naturally subsonic, as opposed to the specialized subsonic loads usually required for suppressed 9mm weapons. At the suggestion of the United States Army, the suppressor also acts as a foregrip to inhibit muzzle rise when fired. Ingram added a small bracket with a small strap beneath the muzzle to aid in controlling recoil during fully automatic fire. The original rate of fire for the MAC-10 in .45 ACP is approximately 1090 rounds per minute. That of the 9mm is approximately 1250, and that of the smaller MAC-11 in .380 ACP is 1500 rounds per minute.

Noting the weapon's poor accuracy, in the 1970s, International Association of Police Chiefs weapons researcher David Steele described the MAC series as "fit only for combat in a phone booth".

=== Suppressor ===
One of the features that brought early attention to the MAC-10 was its sound suppressor, designed by Mitchell WerBell III of Sionics. The suppressor uses a two-stage design, with a wider first section followed by a narrower second section, giving it a distinctive stepped profile.

When used with subsonic ammunition, the suppressor substantially reduces the sound of firing. Under these conditions, the mechanical noise of the bolt cycling is often more noticeable than the muzzle report. Standard .45 ACP ammunition is subsonic and commonly used with the suppressor.

A heat-resistant Nomex cover can be fitted over the suppressor, allowing it to be used as a forward gripping surface while protecting the user from heat buildup.

During the 1970s, U.S. export restrictions on suppressors led several international customers to cancel orders, as the suppressor was a key feature of the MAC-10. This reduction in sales was one factor that contributed to the financial failure of the Military Armament Corporation.

The original Sionics suppressor measures approximately 29.1 centimetres (11.44 inches) in length, has an overall diameter of 5.4 centimetres (2.13 inches), and weighs about 0.54 kilograms (1.20 pounds).

=== Calibers and variants ===
While the original M10 was available chambered for either .45 ACP or 9mm, the M10 is part of a series of machine pistols, the others being the MAC-11/M-11A1, which is a scaled-down version of the M10 chambered in .380 ACP (9×17mm); and the M-11/9, which is a modified version of the M-11 with a longer receiver chambered in 9×19mm, later made by SWD (Sylvia and Wayne Daniel), Leinad and Vulcan Armament. Law enforcement bureaucracies such as the Minnesota Bureau of Criminal Apprehension (BCA) consider MAC-11 variants such as the Leinad PM-11 to be part of the "MAC-10 class pistol".

In the United States, machine guns are National Firearms Act items. As the Military Armament Corporation was in bankruptcy, a large number of incomplete sheet metal frame flats were given serial numbers and then bought by a new company, RPB Industries. Some of the previously completed guns, which were already stamped with MAC, were then stamped with RPB on the reverse side, making it a "double stamp" gun.

RPB Industries made many open-bolt semi-automatic and sub-machine guns before the Bureau of Alcohol, Tobacco, Firearms and Explosives (ATF) seized roughly 200 open-bolt semi-autos during the drug wars of 1981. The ATF insisted that all future semi-automatic firearms were to be manufactured with a closed-bolt design as the open-bolt semi-automatics were considered too easy to illegally convert to full automatic operation.

Semi-automatic variants, Mk III, IV and V were marketed to South American countries where "military" calibers were forbidden for civilian sales were chambered in .30, .41 and .50 Ingram respectively and available as semi-automatic pistols/carbines.

Wayne Daniel, a former RPB machine operator, purchased much of their remaining inventory and formed SWD, designing a new weapon which was more balanced, available either fully or semi-automatic with his new BATFE-approved closed bolt design.

There are several carbine versions of the M-11/9 and Cobray and SWD manufactured a smaller version chambered in .380 ACP as a semiautomatic pistol called the M-12.

Today, while the civilian manufacture, sale and possession of post-1986 select-fire MAC-10 and variants is prohibited, it is still legal to sell templates, tooling and manuals to complete such conversions. These items are typically marketed as being "post-sample" materials for use by Federal Firearm Licensees for manufacturing/distributing select-fire variants of the MAC-10 to law enforcement, military and overseas customers.

== 1994 assault weapons ban in the U.S. ==
The civilian, semi-automatic pistol version of the MAC-10 was affected by the U.S. Federal Assault Weapons Ban enacted in 1994. The ban remained in effect until 2004.

Although the civilian MAC-10 differed mechanically from the original military submachine gun, it still met the law’s definition of an assault weapon. It was derived from a design originally intended for automatic fire. It also exceeded the unloaded weight limit of 1.4 kilograms (50 ounces). The civilian MAC-10 weighs approximately 2.84 kilograms (100.16 ounces).

The pistol also featured a threaded barrel capable of accepting accessories such as a suppressor or flash suppressor. In addition, it used magazines with capacities of up to 32 rounds.

In response, Wayne Daniel redesigned the M-11 platform to comply with the ban. The revised design removed the threaded barrel and modified the magazine release to accept only 10-round magazines. This compliant version was marketed as the PM11/9.

== Foreign copies and derivatives ==
=== BXP ===
The BXP is a 9 mm submachine gun developed in the mid-1980s by the South African company Mechem (currently a division of Denel, formerly under ARMSCOR) and brought into production in 1984. Due to international arms embargoes of Apartheid South Africa, the country was forced to design and manufacture their own weapons. The weapon was intended for use by security forces. The manufacturing rights have changed hands several times, passing from Mechem to Milkor Marketing and later to Truvelo Armoury, the current manufacturer (as of 2009).

=== Cobra carbine ===
The Cobra carbine is a semi-automatic firearm of Rhodesian origin manufactured during the Rhodesian Bush War Era as a self-defense weapon for farmers and is chambered for the 9×19mm Parabellum round. The layout of this weapon is somewhat based on the Uzi submachine gun.

=== Patria submachine gun ===
The Pistola Ametralladora Patria is a close copy of the MAC-10 and features a cooling jacket/barrel extension much like the South African BXP. It was developed by Major Luis Ricardo Dávila, of the Argentine Air Force, and protected by national Patent n° 220494/5/6/7 on August 20, 1980. It uses 9mm rounds for easy transportation and can be operated in either hand. A similar earlier Argentine weapon based on the MAC-10 was also designed in 1977 by manufacturer Domingo Matheu, the Pistola Ametralladora MPA.

=== Enarm MSM ===
The Enarm MSM (Mini Sub Metralhadora or Mini Submachine Gun) was a submachine gun of Brazilian origin based on the Uzi and MAC-10 weapons, made by ENARM. It was chambered in the 9×19mm Parabellum round and also came with a foregrip. Although the weapon performed well in trials, it was discontinued due to the company disbanding due to "internal disruptions".

=== Section Five MAC-10 ===
Section Five Firearms Ltd of Tunbridge Wells, Kent in the UK manufactured a MAC-10 variation in 9×19 Parabellum in the 1970s. They only accept 9×19mm Uzi magazines and are equipped with a folding or a special fixed polymer stock.

== Users ==
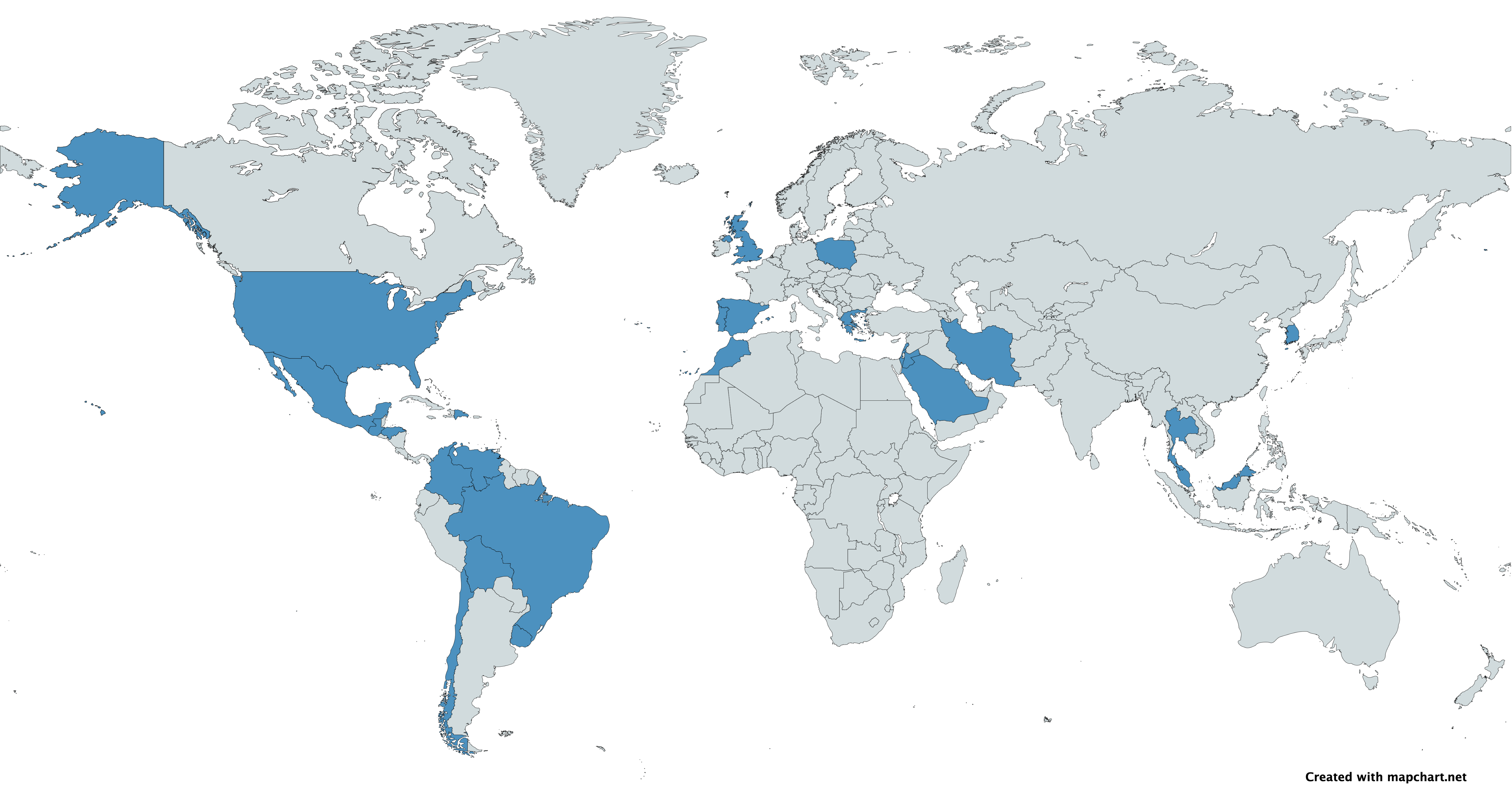
Map with MAC-10 users in blue

- Bolivia 160 9mm MAC-10s manufactured by RPB Industries for use by Bolivian Customs.
- Brazil: Used by GRUMEC
- Chile
- Colombia
- Dominican Republic
- Greece
- Guatemala
- Honduras
- Iran: Used in small numbers by SAVAK agents
- Israel
- Mexico: Used by police
- Morocco: Used by GISGR, DGST and DGED
- Poland
- Portugal
- Saudi Arabia
- South Africa: Used by South African Special Forces (Recces) during the Angolan Civil War and South African Border War
- Spain: Used by various police forces
- United States: Was used by special forces, including LRRPs and Navy SEALs, in the Vietnam War and the Invasion of Grenada; MAC-10s are located in the inventories of Delta Force and the 492nd Special Operations Wing

=== Former Users ===
- Jordan: Formerly used by police forces
- Lebanon: Formerly used by police forces
- Malaysia: Formerly used by the Special Actions Unit, Royal Malaysian Police, now on display at the Police Museum
- South Korea: Issued to special forces in the 1970s, later replaced by the Daewoo K1.
- Thailand: Formerly used by police forces
- United Kingdom: Used by the SAS and 14 Intelligence Company on operations in Northern Ireland. Used formerly by the Special Boat Service.
- Uruguay: Formerly used by general officer's bodyguards, later replaced by Mini-Uzi
- Yugoslavia: One of the first buyers (along with Chile)

=== Non-state users ===
- Lebanese Forces
- Ulster Volunteer Force: semi-auto weapons bought in US and illegally converted to full-auto, then smuggled from Canada

== See also ==
- FB Glauberyt
- MGP-15 submachine gun
- Minebea PM-9
- PP-2000
- Saab Bofors Dynamics CBJ-MS
- Socimi Type 821
- Type 77 submachine gun
- vz.61 Skorpion, Czechoslovak equivalent
