= MAC-11 =

American machine pistol

Military Armaments Corporation M11
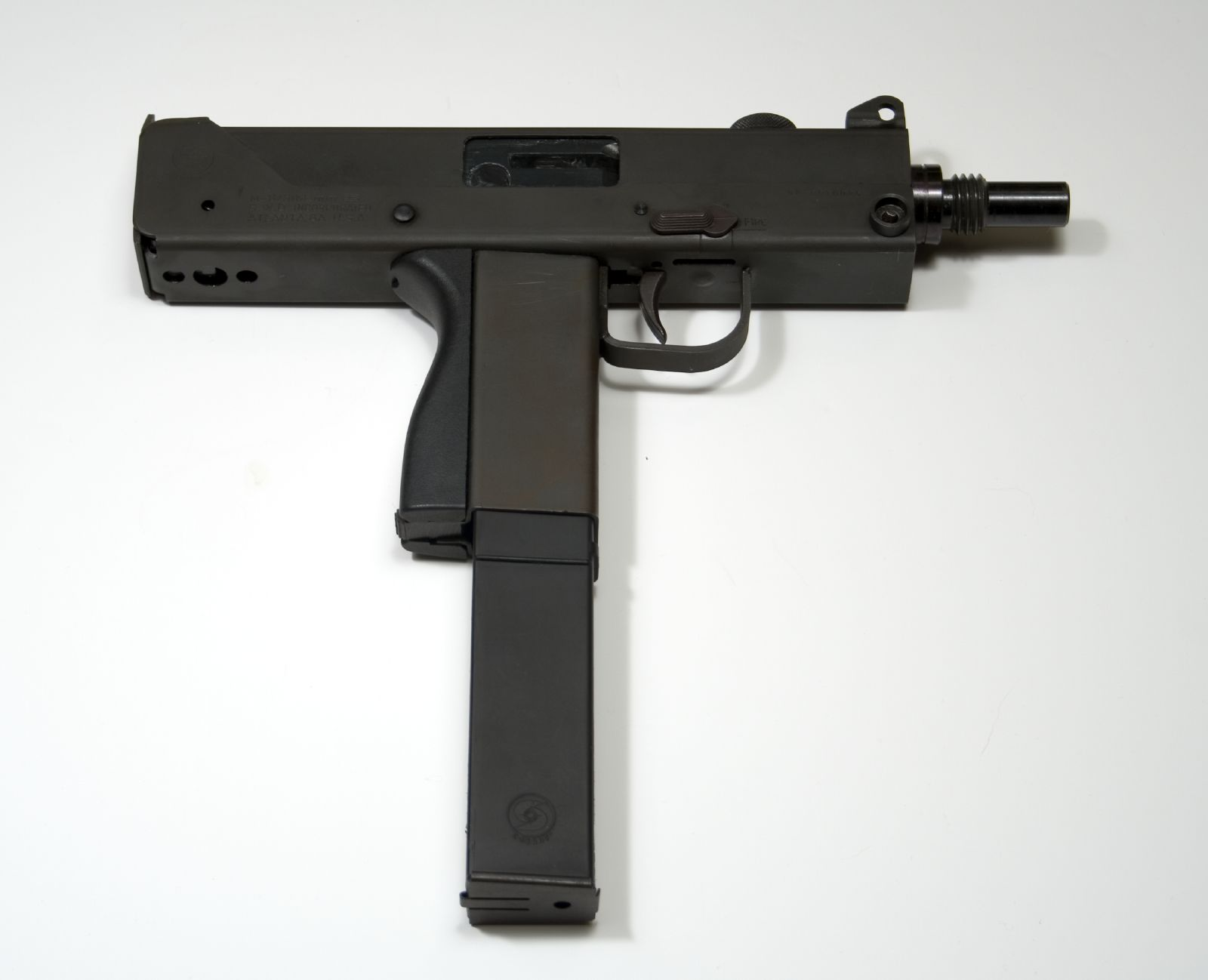
- A Cobray M-11/9, a variant of the MAC-11
- Type: Machine pistol Submachine gun
- Place of origin: United States

Service history
- In service: 1972–present
- Used by: See Users
- Wars: Lebanese Civil War

Production history
- Designer: Gordon Ingram
- Designed: 1972; A prototype was in development in 1964 and 1965
- Manufacturer: Military Armament Corporation; Cobray Company; RPB; SWD Inc.; Jersey Arms; Leinad; MasterPiece Arms
- Produced: 1972–present
- Variants: MAC-11A1; MAC-11/9

Specifications
- Mass: 1.59 kg (3.50 lbs)
- Length: 248 mm (531 mm stock extended) (9.76 in/20.90 in)
- Barrel length: 129 mm (5.08 in)
- Cartridge: .380 ACP (9×17mm); 9×19mm Parabellum
- Action: Straight blowback
- Rate of fire: 1200 rounds/min
- Muzzle velocity: 980 ft/s (300 m/s)
- Effective firing range: 50 meters (.380 ACP); 70 meters (9×19mm Parabellum)
- Feed system: 16 or 32-round box magazine
- Sights: Iron sights

The Military Armament Corporation Model 11, officially abbreviated as "M11" or "M-11", and commonly known as the MAC-11, is a machine pistol/submachine gun developed by American firearm designer Gordon Ingram at the Military Armament Corporation (MAC) during the 1970s in Powder Springs, Georgia, United States. The weapon is a sub-compact version of the Model 10 (MAC-10), and is chambered to fire the smaller .380 ACP round.

This weapon is sometimes confused with the Sylvia & Wayne Daniels M-11/9, its successor the Leinad PM-11, or the Vulcan M-11-9, both of which are later variants of the MAC chambered for the 9 mm Parabellum cartridge. Cobray also made a .380 ACP variant called the M12.

== Design ==
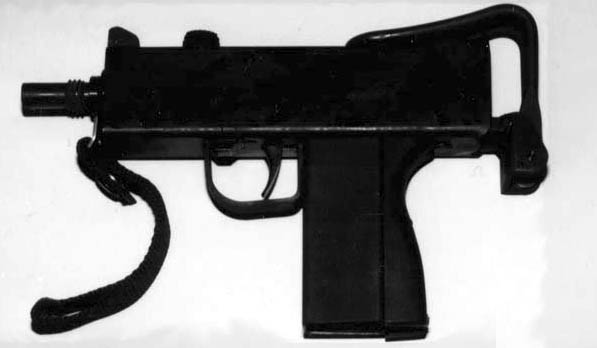
MAC-11 machine pistol

=== Operation ===
Like the larger M-10, the M-11 has iron sights with the rear pinhole sight welded to the receiver. These sights are for use with the folding stock, as using them without the stock is nearly useless because of the initial jump of the weapon due to its heavy, open-bolt design. The M-11A1 also has two safety features which are also found on the Model 10A1. The charging handle rotates to 90 degrees to lock the bolt in the forward position thus preventing the weapon from being cocked. The second safety is a slider that is pushed forward to lock the trigger, which in turn pins the bolt to the rear (cocked) position. This prevents the weapon from discharging even when dropped, which is not uncommon with an open-bolt design.

=== Performance ===
The rate of fire of the M-11A1 is one of the biggest complaints about the firearm. Listed as 1,200 rounds per minute, the MAC-11's high cyclic rate is able to empty the entire 32-round magazine in about two seconds, which many users view as a drawback. Extreme trigger discipline is required to discharge short bursts, which are required for combat effectiveness. Without proper training, the natural tendency of the inexperienced shooter is to hold down the trigger, discharging the entire magazine, often with poor accuracy due to recoil. The rate of fire also varies depending on the weight of bullets used. The gun also has a selector switch that allows it to fire only one round at a time in semi-automatic mode.

Noting the weapon's poor accuracy, in the 1970s International Association of Police Chiefs weapons researcher David Steele described the MAC series as "fit only for combat in a phone booth".

The M-11 is the least common version in the MAC family of firearms.

=== Sound suppressor ===
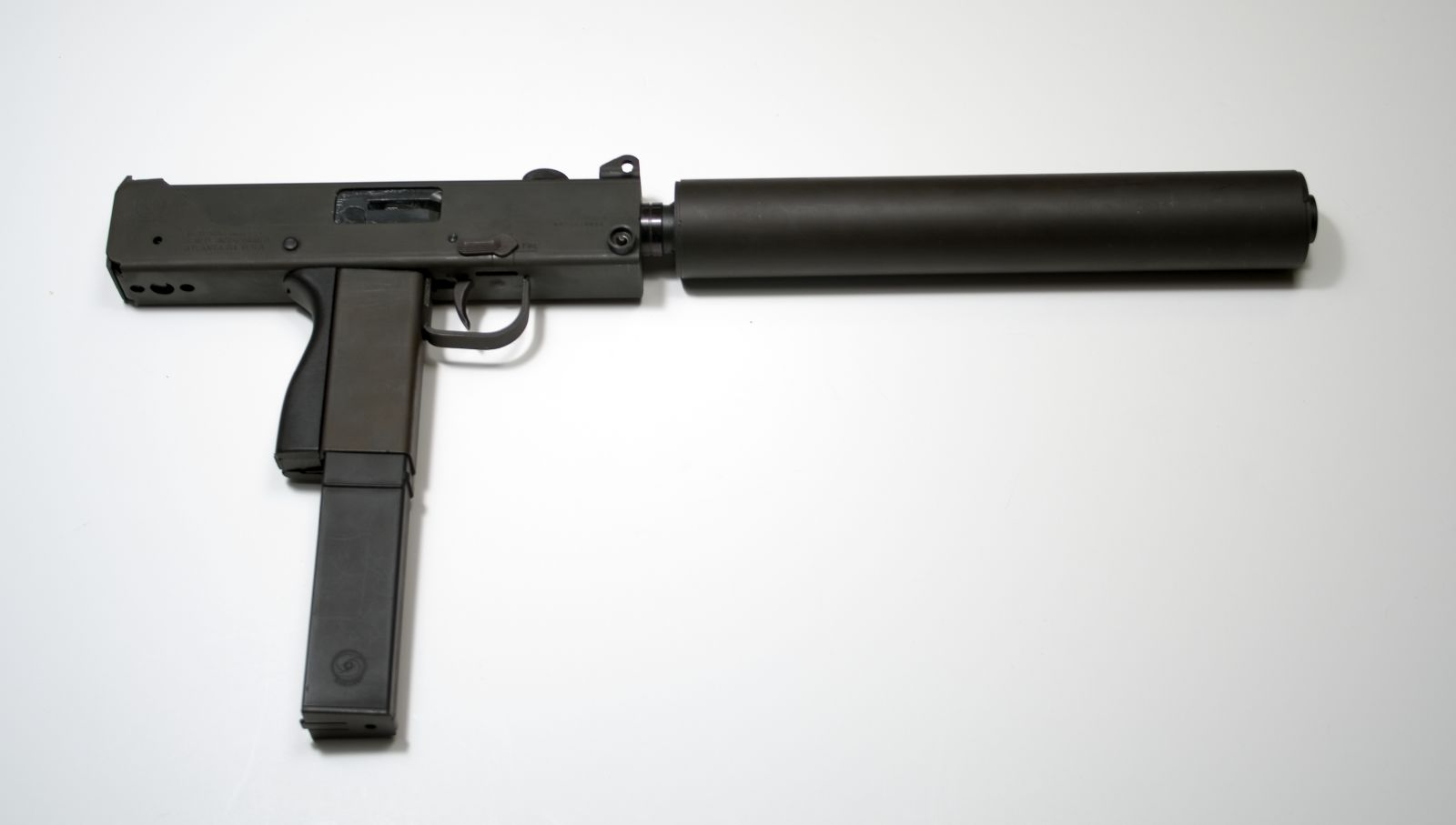
M11/9 with 32-round magazine and suppressor

A specific suppressor was developed for the MAC-11, which used wipes as baffles, instead of the reflex baffles that Mitchell WerBell III created for the MAC-10. Though wipes are less durable than reflex baffles, they had the advantage of proving quieter for the MAC-11. The suppressor is 224 mm (8.8 in) long and is covered with Nomex, a heat-resistant material.

== Manufacturers ==
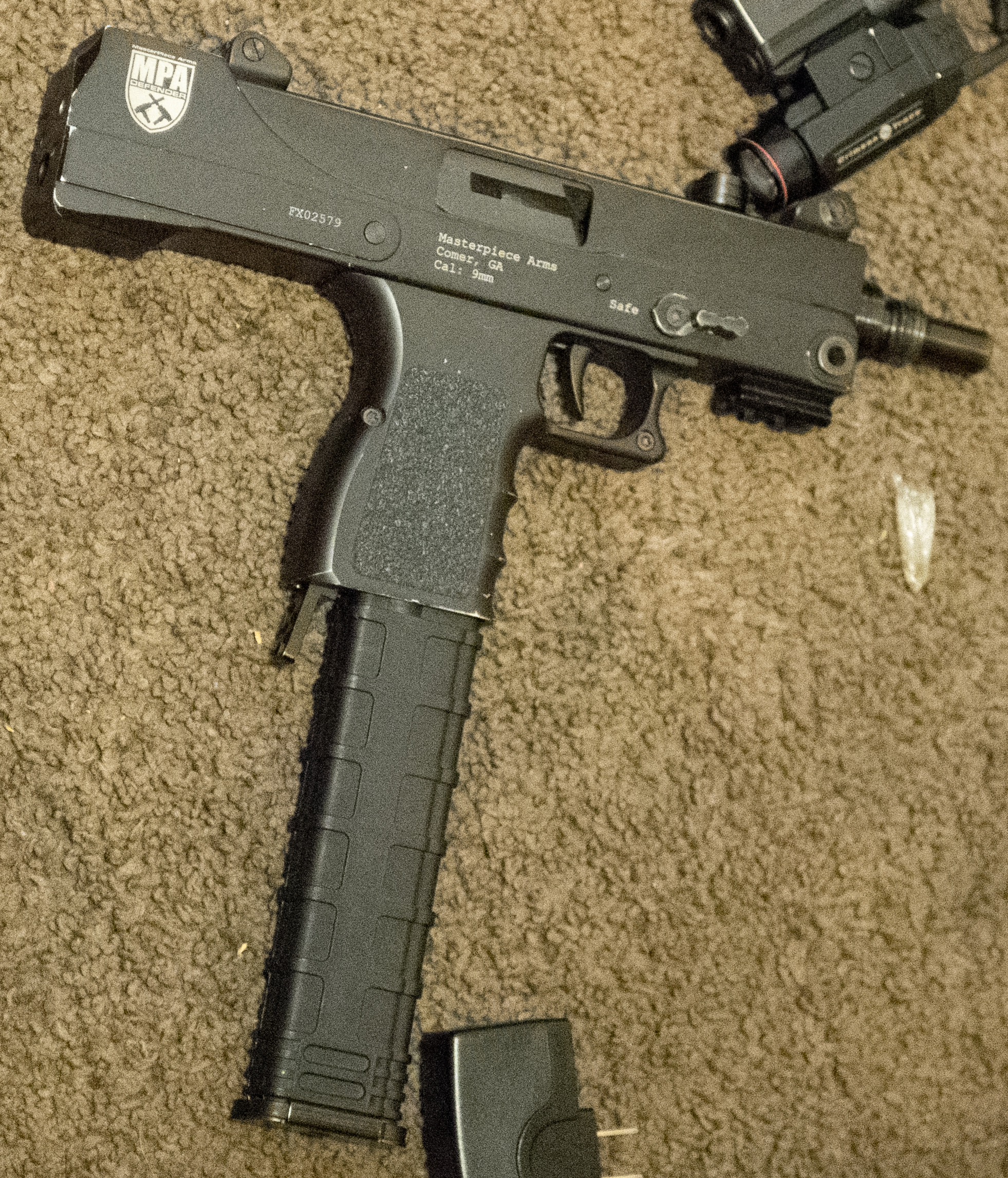
MasterPiece Arms MPA30AT, a modern iteration of the MAC-11 design

MAC-type submachine guns and semi-automatic pistols were first manufactured by the Military Armament Corporation, and later by RPB Inc., Cobray (later named Leinad, then Sylvia/Wayne Daniel Inc.), Jersey Arms, MasterPiece Arms, and Vulcan.

== Users ==
- Argentina: In 1972, 20 were acquired for police and intelligence services. A further 24 were acquired for the Army and air force in 1973.
- Brazil: SWD M11/9 formerly used by GRUMEC
- Colombia: 25 acquired by police forces in the 1970s
- Chile: Cobray M11/9 formerly used by special forces
- Dominican Republic
- Guatemala: 135 acquired for police forces in 1973
- Haiti
- South Korea: 28 acquired for special forces in the 1970s
- Slovenia
- Venezuela: Known to be used by the Cuerpo de Investigaciones Científicas Penales y Criminalísticas (Scientific Penal and Criminal Investigations Corps).

=== Non-state users ===
- Lebanese Forces

== See also ==
- Uzi

== General and cited references ==
- Stepan, Randal; Nolan Wilson, Gary Reisewitz (1989). Mac-10 Cookbook;. Arkansas: Desert Publications.
