= Military Armament Corporation =

Defunct American small arms manufacturer

The Military Armament Corporation (MAC) was an American manufacturer of small arms, founded by Gordon Ingram, a firearm designer, and Mitchell WerBell III, the owner of SIONICS, a manufacturer of suppressors. The company is known for manufacturing the MAC-10 and MAC-11 machine pistols in the 1970s.

== History ==
In 1969, Gordon Ingram, the designer of the MAC-10, joined SIONICS as a Chief Engineer. Mitchell WerBell III designed the MAC-10's suppressor. The company focused on the military market, and attempted to sell the MAC-10 to the United States Army for use in the Vietnam War. WerBell and Ingram demonstrated the MAC-10 to several units of the US Army and in 1970 convinced a group of investors, Quantum Corp, that it might replace the M1911 pistol as the standard sidearm of the Army. The investors formed a new company, the Military Armament Corporation, to make and sell this weapon. WerBell became president of the new company and Ingram Chief Engineer, but within a year, they were both ousted from the company by its investors. SIONICS was later absorbed by the Military Armament Corporation.

The company stopped producing the firearms in 1973 due to internal company politics and filed for bankruptcy in 1975.

In 2017, SDS Imports began operations in Knoxville, Tennessee, and revived the MAC brand, importing shotguns, handguns, and most notably both the MP5 (Mac-5) and the MP5K (Mac-5K) under the MAC name.
