= The Blue Giraffe =

- Short story by L. Sprague de Camp
- W. A. Koll's illustration of the story in Astounding Science-Fiction
- Country: United States
- Language: English
- Genre: Science fiction

Publication
- Published in: Astounding Science-Fiction
- Publisher: Street & Smith Publications, Inc.
- Media type: Print (magazine)
- Publication date: August, 1939

"The Blue Giraffe" is a science fiction short story on the concept of mutation by American writer L. Sprague de Camp. It was first published in the magazine Astounding Science-Fiction for August, 1939. It appeared in book form in the anthology Adventures in Time and Space (Random House, 1946) and later in the anthologies World of Wonder (Twayne, 1951), The Science Fiction Bestiary (Thomas Nelson, 1971), Androids, Time Machines and Blue Giraffes (Follett, 1973), Isaac Asimov Presents the Great Science Fiction Stories: Volume 1, 1939 (DAW Books, 1979), Isaac Asimov Presents The Golden Years of Science Fiction (Bonanza Books, 1983), and An Anthropomorphic Century (FurPlanet Productions, 2015). The story has been translated into Italian, French and German.

== Plot summary ==
Athelstan Cuff, an English immigrant to America, finds his son, Peter, distraught on having learned he is adopted. He reassures the boy that it makes no difference, and at Peter's urging explains why he never had natural children.

In 1976, before coming to America, Cuff is a park official in southern Africa. He is called to a wildlife preserve in the Okavango River Delta by George Mtengeni, the local warden, to investigate the sighting of a strange blue giraffe. Once on the scene, he learns that the mystery extends far deeper. Together with Mtengeni, he observes not just the animal in question but another giraffe with a goat-like beard, only six feet long, a green hippopotamus with pink spots, and a two-headed rhinoceros. Other creatures are so mutated their very survival is threatened, and Mtengeni is concerned about the long-term prospects of the animal population.

Establishing camp in the bush, the two are separated when the warden goes out into the night for firewood and Cuff, hearing what he takes for a native woman's scream from another direction, heads off to investigate. He finds the woman treed by a buffalo and rescues her, only to realize he has now lost his way and cannot relocate the camp. The woman, Ingwamza, undertakes to lead him back to her village. When daylight comes and Cuff can finally see her clearly, he discovers Ingwamza too is a mutant; despite her generally human proportions, she has greenish-yellow hair, a short tail, and the head of a baboon. Startled, he accidentally shoots himself in the foot.

Now dependent on Ingwamza for survival, Cuff allows her to lead him onward despite his horror. They soon arrive at the village of the Fene Abantu, or baboon people. There, Cuff is introduced to their chief, Ingwamza's father Indlovu. The chief explains what he knows about himself and his people. He was the first of their race; the others of the tribe are all his descendants. His first memories are of the black man who taught him to speak, Stanley H. Mqhavi, who worked for "the machine man", a white man named Heeky. Heeky was called the machine man for some sort of device he had built and operated at the edge of the Chobe Swamp. When Heeky died, Mqhavi tried leading Indlovu and his progeny back towards civilization, but became lost in the delta and died after admonishing his charges never to go near the machine. The Fene Abantu have lived in the delta ever since.

Cuff realizes "Heeky" must have been Hickey, a scientist known to have disappeared in the region back in the 1940s. He deduces that Hickey must have been experimenting on the animals with radiation, and his device, never deactivated, has continued to affect the germ plasm of any who wander near it, until their altered descendants have finally attracted outside notice.

Simultaneously, Cuff learns he has a personal problem. Not only is he trapped in the baboon people's village until he recovers, but Indlovu has decided to honor him by marrying him to Ingwamza. His succor comes in the form of Cukata, Ingwamza's former lover, who sneaks into Cuff's hut by night intending to kill his rival. Convincing Cukata he has no wish to come between them, Cuff persuades the creature to help him escape instead. Accordingly, Cukata spirits Cuff out and provides him transportation in the form of Soga, one of a herd of mutated crocodiles the tribe retains as mounts. He also tells him where he can find Hickey's machine.

On the back of Soga, Cuff succeeds in reaching Hickey's old headquarters and turning off his machine. The creatures of the region are now safe from further mutation. But Cuff himself is still in danger from the pursuing Fene Abantu, led by the offended Indlovu. Facing imminent recapture, he is rescued at the last moment by Mtengeni, who has also been searching for him. Under the protection of Mtengeni's rifle, Cuff resolves his differences with Indlovu.

Later, however, Cuff realizes that in approaching and deactivating Hickey's device, he himself must have gotten a full dose of radiation, damaging his own germ plasm. Hence he can never risk having children for fear of producing monsters, and that, as he tells his son Peter, is why he chose to adopt.

== Reception ==
In the analysis of the science fiction historians Alexei and Cory Panshin, the story typified an attitude of de Camp's that was remarkable for the genre of the time: "In the proto-ecological universe projected by de Camp, to be human ... was a natural state of being which we might share with a wide variety of creatures. ... [D]e Camp was capable of imagining what previously would have been thought of as lesser beings–[such as] a tribe of mutated baboons in 'The Blue Giraffe' (Astounding, Aug 1939) ... as being as decent, rational and civilized as most men manage to be, and maybe even more so."

Jamie Todd Rubin, reviewing the issue of Astounding in which the story originally appeared, writes, "Of all the stories in the issue, de Camp’s is the best written. There is no feeling of pulp writing or story-telling. It is a smooth tale that comes alive in your imagination so that you feel like you are right there with the characters on their journey. Abou[t] the only weakness in the story was the ending, which returns to the father and his adopted son. I didn’t think the ending lived up to the full potential of the story, and almost would have liked to seen[sic] the beginning and ending left off, and just go on the wonderful journey through the African wilderness."

== Relation to other works ==
Other uses of intelligent non-human primates by de Camp can be found in his earlier short story "Living Fossil" (1939) and the later novel Genus Homo (1950) written in collaboration with P. Schuyler Miller. Another instance of his use of a "lower" species raised to intelligence by scientific means can be found in his later novella The Virgin of Zesh (1953). De Camp reuses the plot elements of the protagonist gaining sanctuary with a nonhuman race, facing an unwelcome marriage, and being saved by the reluctant bride's betrothed in his later novel The Pixilated Peeress (1991). In that novel Thorolf Zigramson, the hero, is adopted into a tribe of "trolls" (remnant Neanderthals), whose chief seeks to cement the alliance by the same expedient attempted by Indlovu in "The Blue Giraffe."
