= Beretta 93R =

- Type: Machine pistol
- Place of origin: Italy

Service history
- Used by: See Users

Production history
- Designed: 1977–1979
- Manufacturer: Beretta
- Produced: 1979–1993

Specifications
- Mass: 1.17 kg (2.6 lb) empty
- Length: 240 mm (9.4 in)
- Barrel length: 125 mm (4.9 in) (156 mm (6.1 in) with compensator
- Cartridge: 9×19mm Parabellum
- Rate of fire: 700 round/min (3-round burst)
- Muzzle velocity: 380 m/s (1,200 ft/s)
- Effective firing range: 50 m (160 ft)
- Feed system: Detachable box magazine; capacities: 10 rounds (restricted); 15 rounds (flush standard); 17 rounds (flush high-capacity); 18 rounds (flush high-capacity); 20 rounds (standard extended); 30 rounds (extended); 32 rounds (extended); 35 rounds (extended); Detachable drum magazine; capacity: 50 rounds
- Sights: Iron sights

The Beretta 93R is an Italian selective-fire machine pistol, designed and manufactured by Beretta in the late 1970s.

== Designation ==
The "R" stands for Raffica, which is Italian for "volley", "flurry", or "burst" (sometimes spoken "R" as "Rapid" in English).

== History ==
The 93R was designed to be used by the Italian counterterrorism forces of the Polizia di Stato, Nucleo Operativo Centrale di Sicurezza, and the Carabinieri Gruppo di Intervento Speciale (both formed in the late 1970s during the turbulent Years of Lead) but was also adopted by other police and military forces who required a concealable weapon with rapid fire capabilities.

Unlike other Berettas in the 90 series it is single-action only, does not have a decocker, and very few are around today.

Later on, a small number of Beretta 92SB semi-automatic carbines fitted with 93R stocks were made for the Los Angeles Police Department.

The BATFE removed these short-barrel rifles from the purview of the National Firearms Act.

== Design ==
The Beretta 93R is mechanically similar to the Beretta 92.

It can be selected to fire either a three round burst or single fire. A selector switch enables the operator to alternate between the two firing modes.

The pistol is fitted with a collapsible angled foregrip at the front end of the trigger guard to provide better stability when firing.

A folding steel buttstock can be attached at the heel of the grip.

The Beretta 93R is much more controllable compared to other machine pistols because it was designed with only a three-round burst mode as well as a ported barrel.

== Users ==
- Algeria
- Honduras
- Italy

== See also ==
- HK VP70
- Glock 18
- Machine pistol
- Personal defence weapon

== Bibliography ==
- Thompson, Leroy (2012). The Beretta M9 Pistol. Weapon 11. Osprey Publishing. ISBN 978-1-84908-837-4.
