= ENARM Pentagun =

- Type: Shotgun
- Place of origin: Brazil

Production history
- Designer: Nelmo Suzano, Luiz Gonçalves and Gilson Fontes
- Designed: December 1986
- Manufacturer: ENARM

Specifications
- Mass: 3.4kl
- Length: 900mm (commercial), 680mm (military/police)
- Barrel length: 510mm (commercial), 290mm (military/police)
- Cartridge: 12 gauge
- Action: Double-action
- Feed system: 5-round cylinder
- Sights: Iron

The Pentagun is a five-round shotgun manufactured by the Brazilian firm ENARM (Empresa Nacional de Armas). It has a revolver-type cylinder and could be fired in double action-only. The Pentagun's design prevented the gas venting that occurs between the cylinder and barrel on typical revolvers, by means of a movable barrel, which was pulled just prior to firing 1.5mm backwards into the corresponding recesses in the cylinder. The shotgun utilizes a straight-line configuration (similar to AR-15) in order to minimize muzzle rise when firing.

== See also ==
- Armsel Striker - a more successful revolving shotgun.
- Pancor Jackhammer - another failed experimental shotgun.
