= The Science Fiction Bestiary =

Science fiction anthology

- cover of first edition
- Author: edited by Robert Silverberg
- Cover artist: John R. Gibson
- Language: English
- Genre: Science fiction
- Publisher: Thomas Nelson
- Publication date: 1971
- Publication place: United States
- Media type: Print (hardcover)
- Pages: 256 pp.
- ISBN: 0-8407-6172-4

The Science Fiction Bestiary is an anthology of science fiction novelettes and short stories edited by Robert Silverberg. It was first published in hardcover by Thomas Nelson in 1971; it was reprinted in March 1973. The first paperback edition was published by Dell Laurel in February 1974. It has also been translated into German.

The book collects nine novelettes and short stories by various science fiction authors (including one by the editor), together with an introduction by Silverberg. The stories were previously published from 1934 to 1956 in various science fiction magazines.

== Contents ==
- "Introduction" (Robert Silverberg)
- "The Hurkle Is a Happy Beast" (Theodore Sturgeon)
- "Grandpa" (James H. Schmitz)
- "The Blue Giraffe" (L. Sprague de Camp)
- "The Preserving Machine" (Philip K. Dick)
- "A Martian Odyssey" (Stanley G. Weinbaum)
- "The Sheriff of Canyon Gulch" (Poul Anderson and Gordon R. Dickson)
- "Drop Dead" (Clifford D. Simak)
- "The Gnurrs Come from the Voodvork Out" (R. Bretnor)
- "Collecting Team" (Robert Silverberg)
