= Androids, Time Machines and Blue Giraffes =

1973 anthology compiled by Roger Elwood and Vic Ghidalia

- Cover of the first edition
- Editors: Roger Elwood and Vic Ghidalia
- Cover artist: Franz Altschuler
- Language: English
- Genre: Science fiction
- Publisher: Follett Publishing Company
- Publication date: 1973
- Publication place: United States
- Media type: Print (hardcover)
- Pages: 381
- ISBN: 0-695-40369-9

Androids, Time Machines and Blue Giraffes is an anthology of science fiction novelettes and short stories compiled by Roger Elwood and Vic Ghidalia, actually packaged by the former and edited by the latter. It was first published in hardcover by the Follett Publishing Company in August 1973.

The book collects twenty-four novelettes and short stories by various science fiction authors, together with a preface by the packager. The stories were previously published in 1835-1973 in various science fiction and other magazines.

== Contents ==
- "Preface" (Roger Elwood)
- Robots
  - "Moxon's Master" (Ambrose Bierce)
  - "Metal Man" (Jack Williamson)
  - "Lenny" (Isaac Asimov)
  - "Grandma Was Never Like This" (Rachel Cosgrove Payes)
- Monstrosities
  - "The Horla" (Guy de Maupassant)
  - "Counter Charm" (Margaret St. Clair)
  - "The House in the Valley" (August Derleth)
  - "The Unpicker" (William F. Temple)
- Machines
  - "Frank Reade Junior's Air Wonder" (Luis P. Senarens)
  - "The Machine" (John W. Campbell)
  - "Calling Dr. Clockwork" (Ron Goulart)
  - "The Running" (Richard Posner)
- Mutants
  - "King Pest" (Edgar Allan Poe)
  - "White Ape" (H. P. Lovecraft)
  - "The Blue Giraffe" (L. Sprague de Camp)
  - "The Mutant Season" (Robert Silverberg)
- Time Travel
  - "Chronic Argonaut" (H. G. Wells)
  - "Time For Sale" (Ralph Milmer Farley)
  - "Where the Time Went" (James H. Schmitz)
  - "Forerunner" (Jeff Sutton)
- Space Travel
  - "The Begum's Fortune" (excerpt) (Jules Verne)
  - "Son of the Stars" (Eando Binder)
  - "Sunjammer" (Arthur C. Clarke)
  - "Terra Phobia" (Dean R. Koontz)
