= Gerry Patrick Hemming =

American mercenary and CIA asset

Gerald Patrick "Gerry" Hemming, Jr. (March 1, 1937 – January 28, 2008) was a former U.S. Marine, mercenary and Central Intelligence Agency asset within the Domestic Contact Division beginning in 1960, using the aliases Jerry Patrick, Gerry Patrick, Heming and Hannon. He was primarily involved in covert operations against Cuba.

== Early background ==
Hemming was born in Los Angeles on March 1, 1937, one of eleven children. He attended El Monte Union High School in California before joining the United States Marine Corps in 1954. He worked as an aviation control tower operator, later being promoted to Sergeant and receiving an honorable discharge.

Hemming left the Marines in October 1958 and the following year traveled to Cuba where he aided Fidel Castro and his revolutionary forces. He was an assistant to his fellow American William Alexander Morgan, who was later executed by Castro's government. Hemming reached the rank of Sergeant but eventually became disillusioned with Castro. He began providing information to U.S. intelligence.

== Interpen ==
Hemming was the leader of Interpen, or Intercontinental Penetration Force, a group of anti-Castro guerrillas who trained at No Name Key, Florida in the early 1960s. Hemming drilled its volunteers, who stayed at a house in Little Havana in Miami where weapons were stored. Regarding the funding of the group, Hemming said "There were dribs and drabs from people connected with organized crime, some from the right wing, and even from some quite liberal sources".

Declassified FBI files show that the agency had an informer within Interpen. His code name was MM T-1. In one document dated June 16, 1961, it said that MM T-1 had "been connected with Cuban revolutionary activities for the past three years". One document dated May 12, 1961, claims that Allen Lushane of Miami "had made a trip to Texas to recruit Americans for some future military action against the Government of Cuba". The document adds that the "first training camp was established by Gerald Patrick Hemming with Dick Watley and Ed Colby running the camp." In an interview that he gave to John M. Newman on January 6, 1995, Hemming claimed that the FBI informer was Steve Wilson.

This group of experienced soldiers were involved in training members of the anti-Castro groups funded by the Central Intelligence Agency in Florida in the early 1960s. When the government began to crack down on raids from Florida in 1962, Interpen set up a new training camp in New Orleans, Louisiana. When this work came to an end in 1964 Hemming was employed in the construction industry in Miami.

In 1971 he co-founded the Miami-based arms sales company Parabellum Corporation with his friend Mitch WerBell and the Cuban exile Anselmo Alliegro. During March and April 1972, while traveling in Guatemala, El Salvador, and Nicaragua, Hemming was able penetrate a conspiracy to assassinate the Chief Executives and Members of Congress of the Republic of Costa Rica, and the Chief Executive of the Republic of Panama.

== Hemming and Lee Harvey Oswald ==
Gerry Hemming has granted long interviews with several writers working on the assassination of John F. Kennedy. These include Anthony Summers (Conspiracy), Noel Twyman (Bloody Treason), John M. Newman (Oswald and the CIA), and Greg Burnham (AssassinationOfJFK.net). Greg Burnham possesses what is arguably the largest inventory of Hemming recorded interviews.

In one such interview, Hemming tells Burnham that [Hemming] introduced Lee Harvery Oswald to then CIA Chief of Counterintelligence, James Jesus Angleton. Some researchers believe that a combination of Interpen members and anti-Castro Cubans were involved in the assassination of John F. Kennedy. This included Hemming, James Arthur Lewis, Roy Hargraves, Edwin Collins, Steve Wilson, David Sanchez Morales, Herminio Díaz García, Tony Cuesta, Eugenio Martinez, Virgilio Gonzalez, Felipe Vidal Santiago and William "Rip" Robertson. While others insist that the “Sponsors" had no need to recruit from a group whose members were emotionally invested in JFK’s demise, as such investment can compromise the success of the mission.

== Criminal investigations ==
Gerry Hemming was arrested on August 23, 1976, for the illegal transfer of a silencer and drug smuggling. It seems that this was the point that he began talking about his past work with the CIA. He told one reporter: "All of a sudden they're accusing me of conspiracy to import marijuana and cocaine. Hey, what about all the other things I've been into for the last 15 years, lets talk about them. Let's talk about the Martin Luther King thing, let's talk about Don Freed, Le Coubre, nigger-killers in bed with the Mafia, the Mafia in bed with the FBI, and the goddamn CIA in bed with all of them. Let's talk about all the people I dirtied up for them over the years."

In April 1980 Hemming was arrested in Palm Beach County, Florida and charged with drug trafficking after he piloted a twin-engine plane that landed in Lantana Airport. An airport mechanic observed 728 pounds of marijuana and 177 pounds of quaaludes on the plane. His bond was set at $200,000. Hemming's defense was that he had been working for the U.S. government by attempting to infiltrate drug smuggling organizations. The government produced a witness to testify that this was false. His defense was rejected, with a maximum 30-year sentence being imposed for smuggling marijuana, alongside a 5 year consecutive sentence for possession of quaaludes. He served seven years before being released.

== Liberty Lobby ==
Hemming was convicted by a Miami jury of conspiracy to import marijuana. In 1978 he was sentenced to six months in prison by U.S. District Judge William Hoeveler. Hemming was released on appeal bond and the conviction was later overturned.

In August, 1978, Victor Marchetti published an article about the assassination of John F. Kennedy in the Liberty Lobby newspaper, The Spotlight. In the article Marchetti argued that the House Select Committee on Assassinations (HSCA) had obtained a 1966 CIA memo that revealed Hemming, E. Howard Hunt, and Frank Sturgis had been involved in the plot to kill Kennedy. Marchetti's article also included a story that Marita Lorenz had provided information on this plot.

Hunt decided to take legal action against the Liberty Lobby. In December, 1981, he was awarded $650,000 in damages. Liberty Lobby appealed to the United States Court of Appeals. It was claimed that Hunt's attorney, Ellis Rubin, had offered a clearly erroneous instruction as to the law of defamation. The three-judge panel agreed and the case was retried. This time Mark Lane defended the Liberty Lobby against Hunt's action.

Lane eventually discovered Marchetti's sources. The main source was William R. Corson. It also emerged that Marchetti had also consulted James Angleton and A. J. Weberman before publishing the article. As a result of obtaining depositions from David Atlee Phillips, Richard Helms, G. Gordon Liddy, Stansfield Turner, and Marita Lorenz, plus a skillful cross-examination by Lane of E. Howard Hunt, the jury decided in January, 1985, that Marchetti had not been guilty of libel when he suggested that John F. Kennedy had been assassinated by people working for the CIA. Lane stated that during a later meeting they had, Hemming corroborated the details of the assassination which were outlined during the trial.

== Later life ==
Hemming became an active member of the JFK assassination research community later in life. He served for a time as official dignitary of the South Florida Research Group. He was interviewed for the 1988 Jack Anderson documentary American Expose: Who Killed JFK?. He was an advisor for Oliver Stone's 1991 film JFK. In 1996 he participated in November in Dallas: The JFK-Lancer Conference on assassination research, hosted in Dallas from November 21 to 24. He delivered brief remarks before making himself available for questions from the panelists: Gordon Winslow, Jerry Rose, George Michael Evica, and Charles Drago. This panel became the subject of an article by a journalist who attended the conference.

Hemming died aged 70 in January 2008. He was found dead at his home in North Carolina and was survived by six children, being buried at Sandhills State Veterans Cemetery.

== Filmography ==
- JFK (1991), technical advisor to Oliver Stone's film about the assassination of Kennedy.
- Cuba: Lost in the Shadows (2011), a documentary in which Hemming plays a key role.
