= Ingram Model 6 =

Model 6
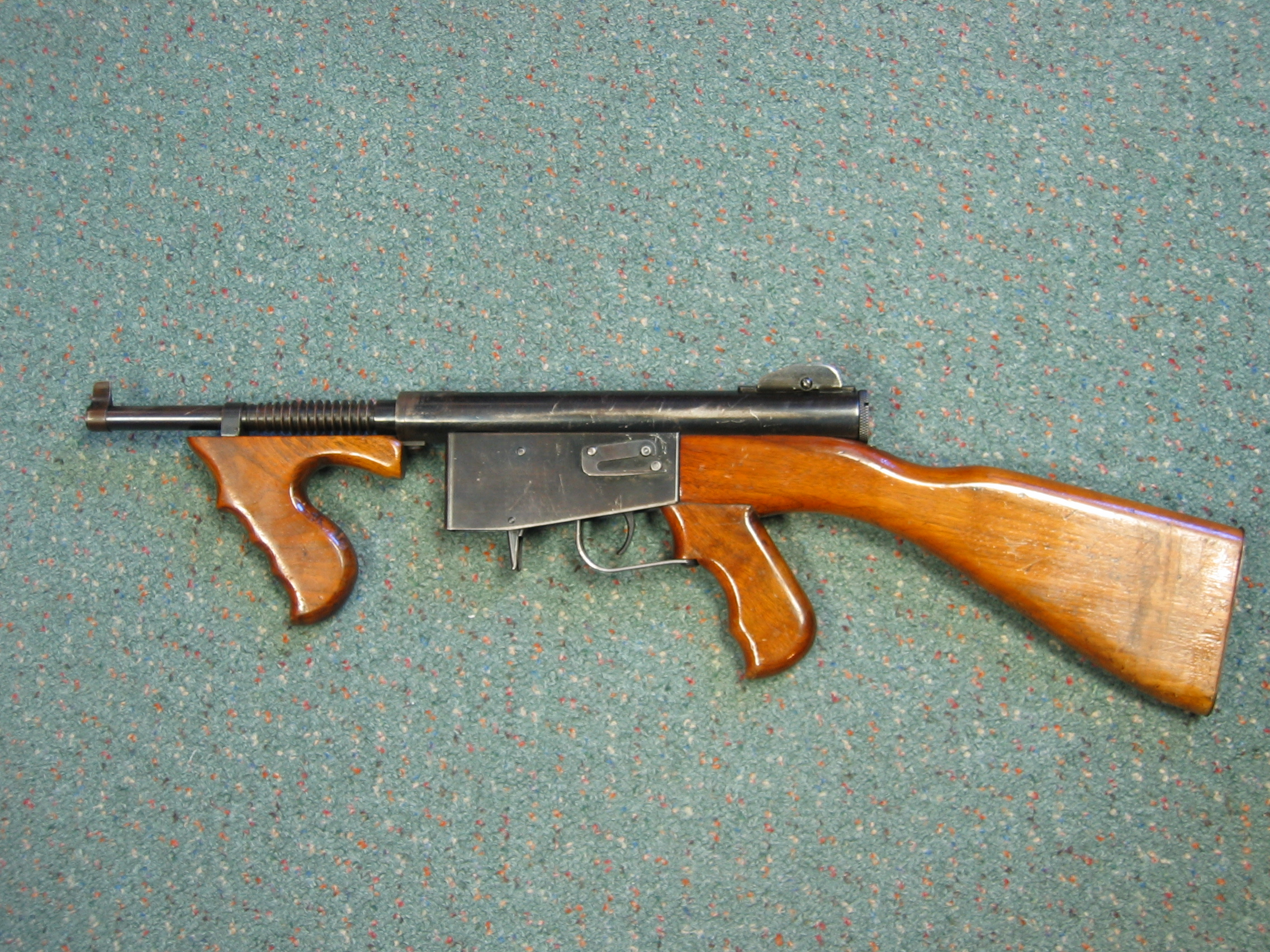
- Ingram Model 6 SMG
- Type: Submachine gun
- Place of origin: United States

Service history
- In service: 1949–1952
- Used by: Cuba; Peru; United States

Production history
- Designer: Gordon B. Ingram
- Manufacturer: Police Ordnance Company
- Produced: 1949
- Variants: Model 7 Model 8 Model 9

Specifications
- Mass: 3.3 kg
- Length: 762 mm
- Barrel length: 228 mm
- Cartridge: 9×19mm Parabellum.45 ACP.38 Super
- Action: Simple blowback
- Rate of fire: 600 rounds/min
- Effective firing range: 25 m for .45 ACP variants, 50 m for .38 Super and 9mm Parabellum variants
- Maximum firing range: 100 m
- Feed system: 30-round magazine
- Sights: Iron sights

The Ingram Model 6 is a .45 ACP caliber submachine gun that was designed by Gordon B. Ingram and manufactured from 1949 through 1952 by the Police Ordnance Company of Los Angeles, California, US.

== Overview ==
Although the Model 6 has an appearance similar to the Thompson submachine gun, it was intended to be sold as a low cost alternative for domestic law enforcement agencies in the United States. Normally produced with a wood stock, pistol grip and front grip, the overall length is approximately 30" with the barrel being 9". The magazine is a stick design with a capacity of 30 rounds.

== Variants ==
A Model 7 version was made in 1952, the differences being that it was able to fire from a closed bolt and has a fire mode selector on. Only a few of these were made in the 1950s.

== See also ==
- List of submachine guns
