= Armsel Striker =

South African revolver-type combat shotgun

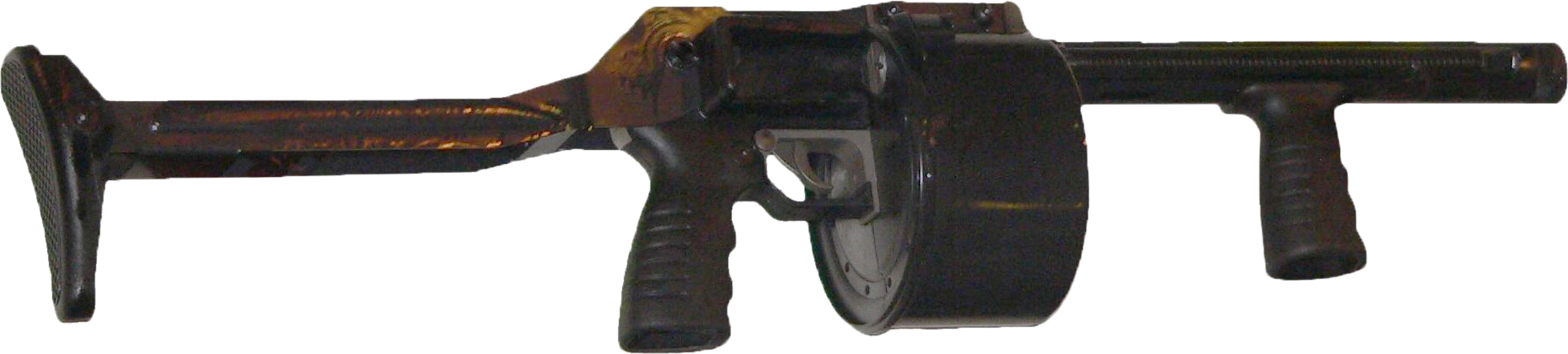
- Type: Combat shotgun, Riot control weapon
- Place of origin: South Africa

Service history
- In service: 1993–present

Production history
- Designer: Hilton R. Walker
- Designed: 1981

Specifications
- Mass: 4.2 kg (empty); 4.4 kg (loaded)
- Length: 792 mm (31.18 inch); 508 mm (20 inch) (stock folded) (with 12 in barrel)
- Barrel length: 191 mm (7.5 in); 305 mm (12 in); 356 mm (14 in); 470 mm (18.5 in)
- Cartridge: 12 gauge
- Action: Rotating cylinder
- Feed system: 12-round revolving cylinder
- Sights: Fixed trough and blade iron sights. Optic rail provision.

The Armsel Striker, also known as the Sentinel Arms Co Striker-12, Protecta, Protecta Bulldog and SWD Street Sweeper is a 12-gauge shotgun with a revolving cylinder that was designed for riot control and combat.

== History ==
The Armsel Striker was designed by Hilton R. Walker, a Zimbabwean (formerly Rhodesian) citizen, in 1981. Walker subsequently emigrated to South Africa, bringing with him the design for the Striker shotgun. His shotgun became a success and was exported to various parts of the world, despite some drawbacks. The rotary cylinder was bulky, had a long reload time, and the basic action was not without certain flaws.

Walker redesigned his weapon in 1989, removing the cylinder rotation mechanism, and adding an auto cartridge ejection system. The new shotgun was named the "Protecta".

A copy of the Striker was made by the American gunmaker Cobray and marketed as the "SWD Street Sweeper" from 1989 to 1993.

== Design and features ==
The Striker's most prominent feature is a 12-round capacity revolving cylinder. Due to the size of the cylinder, unlike usual revolvers which rotate the cylinder with the trigger pull, the Striker utilizes a clock spring that has to be wound manually. Reloading the Striker is a rather cumbersome process as there is no automatic ejection; shells need to be ejected with an ejector rod on the right side of the barrel, before loading the cylinder one shell at a time, advancing the cylinder for each shot with a lever on the back of the gun, before finally winding up the cylinder spring.

The later Protecta model changed the mechanics of the weapon substantially. The cylinder spring was removed; instead the cylinder is advanced by rotating the barrel shroud and attached foregrip, turning the weapon from semi-automatic to manually operated. The Protecta also featured an auto-ejection mechanism that vents excess gas from firing into the cylinder to eject the previously fired round, somewhat simplifying the reloading process. It still retains the ejector rod, as the last round must be ejected manually.

Licensed copies produced by Sentinel Arms combined the semi-automatic, spring-driven design of the Striker and the auto-ejection mechanism from the Protecta into one weapon.

Other features were a top-folding stock and barrel lengths of 18, 12 and 7 inches.

== Availability in the United States ==
After a proposal by the Brady Campaign in 1993, Treasury Secretary Lloyd Bentsen declared the Striker and Street Sweeper destructive devices under the National Firearms Act the following year, their transfer and ownership becoming regulated by the Bureau of Alcohol, Tobacco, Firearms and Explosives (ATF).

== Variants ==
- Armsel Striker — Hilton Walker's first design.
- Armsel Protecta — An improved version of the Striker. Readying the weapon for firing was simplified and the weapon's reliability was improved.
- Armsel Protecta Bulldog — An extremely shortened, stockless version of the Protecta, intended for building entry and vehicular duties.
- Sentinel Arms Striker-12 — A licensed and improved copy of the Striker for the American market made by Sentinel Arms Co. It was available with an 18-inch barrel and a 7-inch stockless version.
- Cobray/SWD Street Sweeper — A lower-end clone of the Striker, with limited parts commonality to the original weapons system.
- Cobray/SWD Ladies Home Companion/LHC — A reduced caliber version of the Streetsweeper. The trigger group is attached to a .410 bore or .45/70 Government cylinder and barrel.

== Users ==
- Chile
  - Lautaro Special Operations Brigade
- Israel
  - Israel Police
- South Africa
  - South African National Defence Force
- Sri Lanka
  - Sri Lankan Air Force
- Vietnam
  - People's Army of Vietnam

== See also ==
- Automatic shotgun
- Combat shotgun
- ENARM Pentagun
- List of combat shotguns
- List of shotguns
- Riot shotgun
- Semi-automatic shotgun
