= Gordon Ingram =

American firearm designer (1924–2004)

- Born: Gordon Bailey Ingram; December 30, 1924; Los Angeles, California, U.S.
- Died: November 4, 2004 (aged 79)
- Occupations: Firearm designer; inventor; entrepreneur
- Known for: Ingram Model 6 (1949); MAC-10 (1964); MAC-11 (1972); Co-founder of the Military Armament Corporation

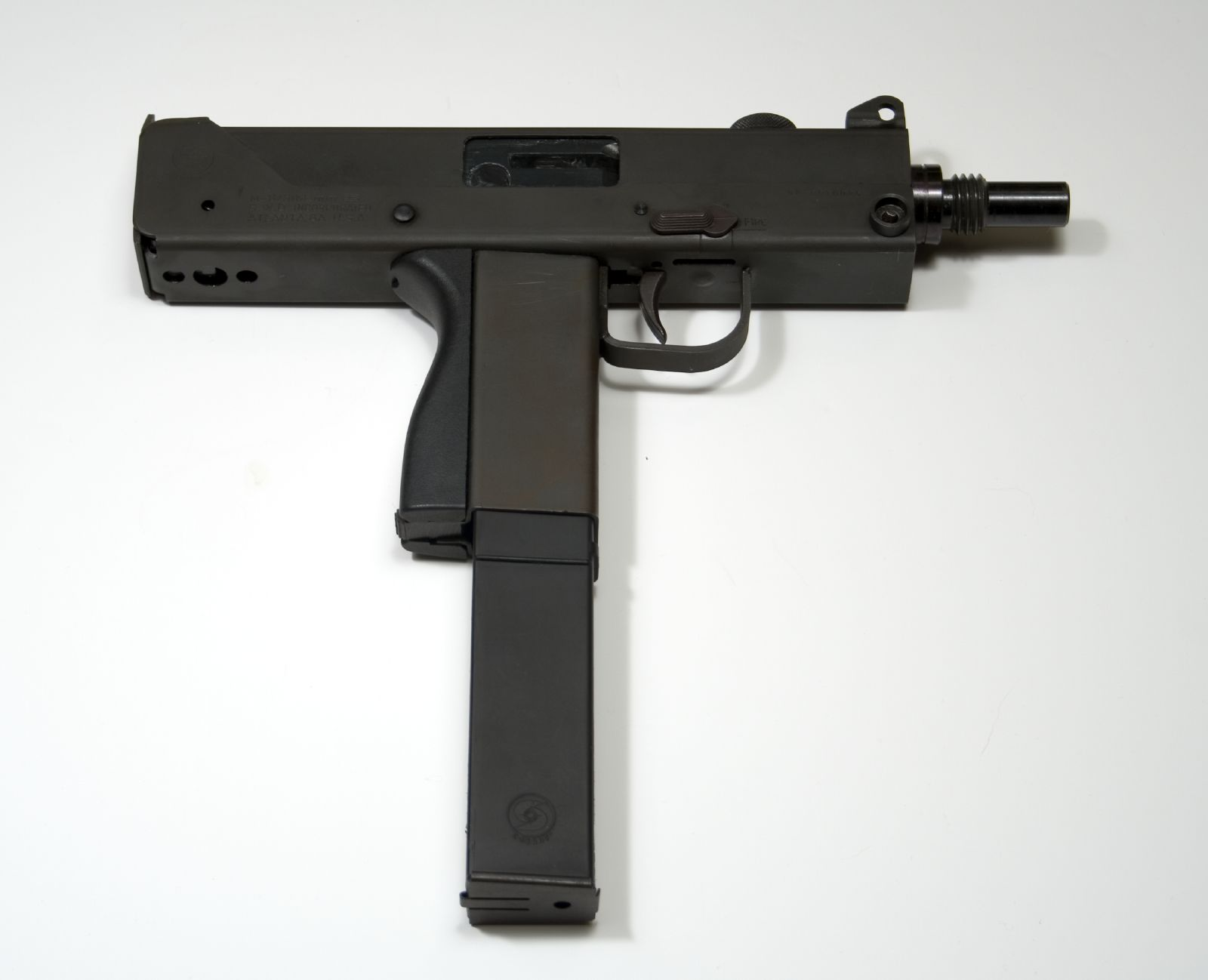
A MAC-11, one of Ingram's most notable inventions

Gordon Bailey Ingram (December 30, 1924 – November 4, 2004) was an American firearm designer, inventor, and entrepreneur. He is best known for creating the MAC-10 and MAC-11 machine pistols, for which he sometimes known as "the father of the machine pistol," and is widely credited with re-popularizing the submachine gun. He co-founded the Military Armament Corporation with Mitchell WerBell III, which manufactured the pistols.

== Biography ==
Gordon Bailey Ingram was born on December 30, 1924, in Los Angeles, California. His first foray into the weapons design world was during his years of service in the United States Army. He designed the Ingram Model 6 in 1949 and later went on to design and manufacture the MAC-10 and MAC-11 machine pistols in 1964 and 1972, respectively. Ingram's role in the creation of the MAC-10 earned him the moniker "father of the machine pistol."

His design accomplishments spanned over forty years and left behind several notable designs. His Ranchero and Durango series of rifles incorporated the concept of multiple-use weapons that all use not only the same pistol-caliber rounds but the associated magazines as well.

Ingram was also known for his associations with some of the American defense sector's most prominent figures, such as Mitchell WerBell III, who designed the suppressor for the MAC-10.
