= Mitchell WerBell III =

American mercenary (1918–1983)

- Born: March 18, 1918; Philadelphia, Pennsylvania, U.S.
- Died: December 16, 1983 (aged 65); Los Angeles, California, U.S.
- Military career
- Allegiance: United States
- Branch: United States Army
- Service years: 1942–1946
- Rank: Captain
- Unit: Office Of Strategic Services
- Conflicts: World War II; Dominican Civil War

Mitchell Livingston WerBell III (March 18, 1918 – December 16, 1983) was a U.S. Office of Strategic Services (OSS) operative, mercenary, paramilitary trainer, firearms engineer, and arms dealer.

== Early life and OSS service ==
WerBell was born in Philadelphia, the son of a Tsarist cavalry officer in the Imperial Army of Russia. Journalist Penny Lernoux described WerBell in her 1984 book In Banks We Trust as "a mysterious White Russian". In 1942 WerBell joined the Office of Strategic Services (OSS) and served in China, Burma, and French Indochina. As a guerrilla operative during World War II, he carried out a secret mission for the OSS under the command of Paul Helliwell in China with E. Howard Hunt, Lucien Conein, John K. Singlaub and Ray Cline.

Following World War II, WerBell briefly worked as the director of advertising and public relations for Rich's, a department store in Atlanta, Georgia; he left after a year to open his own PR firm.

== SIONICS ==
After WerBell closed his PR firm to design suppressors for firearms, he incorporated SIONICS to design suppressors for the M16 rifle. The name was an acronym for "Studies In the Operational Negation of Insurgents and Counter-Subversion". Through SIONICS he developed a low cost, efficient suppressor for machine guns.

In 1967, he partnered with Gordon B. Ingram, inventor of the MAC-10 submachine gun. They added WerBell's suppressor to Ingram's machinegun and attempted to market it to the U.S. military as "Whispering Death" for use in the Vietnam War. WerBell is credited with over 25 different suppressor designs and the "WerBell Relief Valve", a mechanism designed for machinegun suppressors. WerBell's modular designs and use of exotic materials such as titanium in sound suppressors influence their design to the present day.

SIONICS was absorbed by Military Armament Corporation (MAC), later called the Cobray Company, where WerBell developed a training center for counterterrorism in the 1970s. The courses lasted 11 weeks and students included members of the military, high-risk executives, CIA agents, and private individuals. WerBell concurrently ran Defense Systems International, an arms brokerage firm.

== Mercenary activities ==
In the 1950s, WerBell served as a security advisor to Dominican dictator Rafael Trujillo and to the Batista regime in Cuba.

According to FBI archives, WerBell may have attempted to assassinate Fidel Castro.

In 1965 WerBell allegedly played a large part in planning the U.S. intervention in the Dominican Civil War, codenamed "Operation Power Pack". The intervention was largely successful in restoring order on the island.

WerBell helped plan an invasion of Haiti by Cuban and Haitian exiles against François "Papa Doc" Duvalier in 1966 called Project Nassau (but internally referred to as "Operation Istanbul"). The mission, which, according to Federal Communications Commission (FCC) and the Special Subcommittee on Investigations of the House Commerce Committee, was financially subsidized, and to be filmed by CBS News, was aborted when the participants were arrested by the FBI. WerBell was released without being charged.

In 1971 he co-founded the Miami-based arms sales company Parabellum Corporation with his friend Gerry Patrick Hemming and the Cuban exile Anselmo Alliegro. In 1972, WerBell was approached by the Abaco Independence Movement (AIM) from the Abaco Islands, a region of the Bahamas, who were worried about the direction the Bahamas were taking and were considering other options, such as independence or remaining a separate Commonwealth nation under the Crown in case of the Bahamas gaining independence (which occurred in 1973). AIM was funded by the Phoenix Foundation, a group that helps to build micronations. The AIM collapsed into internal bickering before a coup by WerBell could be carried out.

In 1973, WerBell was asked to assist with a coup d'état against Omar Torrijos of Panama, according to CIA documents released in 1993. WerBell sought clearance from the CIA which denied getting involved in coups. The plan was not implemented. In 1977, at the suggestion of Roy Frankhouser, WerBell was hired by Lyndon LaRouche as his head of security.

In a 1979 20/20 interview WerBell claimed that Coca-Cola had hired him for $1 million to take care of kidnapping threats against its Argentine executives during an urban terrorist wave in 1973. Coca-Cola later denied the claim.

In a 1981 interview, WerBell revealed he was about to break with the U.S. Labor Party, whose security staff he had been training at his Powder Springs, Georgia estate.

Later in life, WerBell claimed he was a retired Lieutenant General in the Royal Free Afghan Army or sometimes an Afghan Defense Minister after supplying Afghanistan with large weapons contracts and training. WerBell claimed he was given the billet of Major General in the U.S. Army to allow him to travel freely in Southeast Asia during the Vietnam War to demonstrate and sell his silenced submachineguns and sound suppressors. This has been confirmed by Major General John Singlaub and Lt Col. William Mozey.

=== Other exploits ===
WerBell and Mario Sandoval Alarcón's associate Leonel Sisniega Otero plotted a coup in Guatemala that failed in 1982.

In 1988, Sheriff Sherman Block of Los Angeles announced that Hustler publisher Larry Flynt wrote WerBell a $1 million check in 1983 to kill Hugh Hefner (founder of Playboy), Bob Guccione (founder of Penthouse), Walter Annenberg (owner of Triangle Publications), and Frank Sinatra. Los Angeles television station KNBC displayed a photocopy of the check. WerBell died at the UCLA medical facility in Los Angeles on December 16, a month after receiving the check.

=== Death and courtroom poisoning claim ===
In the 1989 Cotton Club murder case of Roy Radin, Arthur Michael Pascal, then owner of a Beverly Hills security firm, testified that prosecution witness William Rider, Flynt's former brother-in-law and private security agent:

"Told him of poisoning soldier of fortune Mitchell WerBell III in 1983 in order to take over WerBell's counterterrorist school based in Atlanta. Pascal said that Rider and Flynt poured four to six ounces of a digoxin, a powerful heart relaxant, into WerBell's drink during a cocktail party at Flynt's Los Angeles mansion. WerBell, 65, a security consultant for Flynt, died of a heart attack at UCLA Medical Center a few days later."

Flynt and his attorney, Alan Isaacman, were in Bangkok and "unavailable for comment, according to a Hustler magazine spokeswoman" with "Isaacman characterized an earlier Rider claim of a Flynt-paid murder contract as 'fantasy'." Rider passed a polygraph test regarding "possible involvement in homicides", according to courtroom testimony. Pascal was later arraigned on a murder charge in 1991 due to tapes Rider provided investigators. In 1993, Pascal pleaded guilty to killing a prostitute.

== See also ==
- SIONICS
- Cobray Company
- Military Armament Corporation (MAC)
