= Machine pistol =

Fully automatic handgun

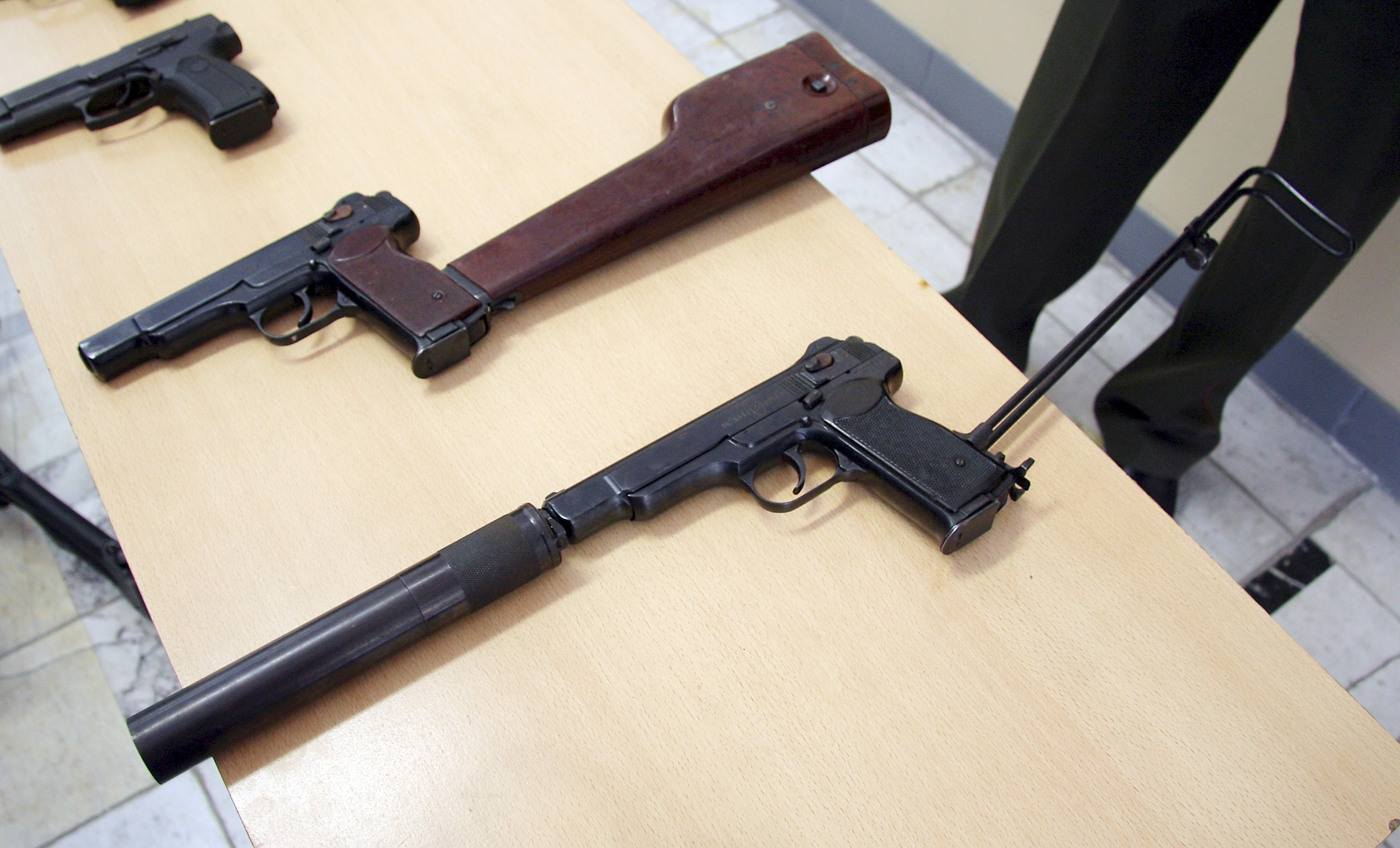
Soviet Stechkin APS and suppressed APB select-fire machine pistols, introduced into Soviet service in 1951

A machine pistol is a handgun that is capable of fully automatic fire, including stockless handgun-style submachine guns.

The Austrians introduced the world's first machine pistol to be used in combat, the Steyr Repetierpistole M1912/P16, during World War I. The Germans also experimented with machine pistols, by converting various types of semi-automatic pistols to full-auto, leading to the development of the first practical submachine guns. During World War II, machine pistol development was widely disregarded in favor of submachine gun mass-production. After the war, machine pistol development was limited and only a handful of manufacturers would develop new designs, with varying degrees of success. This concept would eventually lead to the development of the personal defense weapon or PDW.

Machine pistols today are not as commonly used as they were once were, as their defining ability was simply replaced by more modern firearms.

== History ==
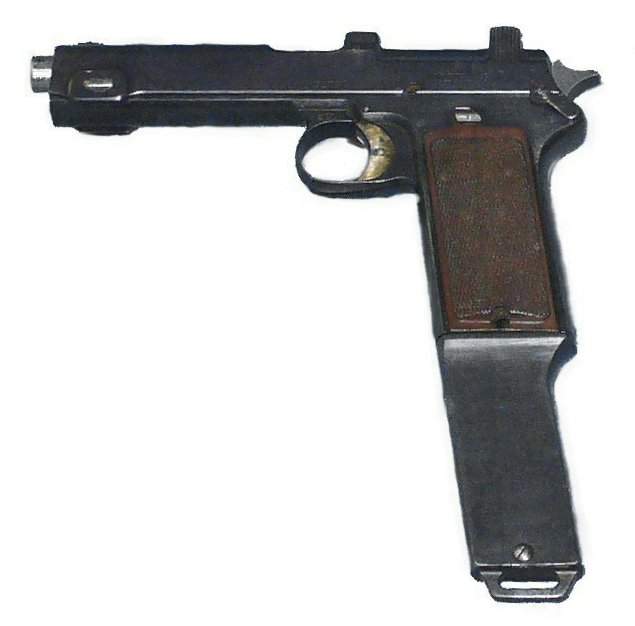
Steyr "Repetierpistole M1912/P16", one of the world's first machine pistols

Between 1894 and 1895 a fully automatic Borchardt C93 was demonstrated to the Austrian and United States militaries.

In 1896 a select-fire pistol was patented by the British inventor Hugh Gabbett-Fairfax.

Georg Luger himself demonstrated a ''hand mitrailleuse'' converted from a regular Luger pistol at the 1901 Austrian trials.

In February 1914 Manuel and Everardo Navarro of Celaya, Mexico patented a full auto conversion of the Luger. A spring arm was attached to the sear bar, which would enable automatic fire by adjusting the thumb screw. When fired in full auto it would fire continuously until the user released the grip safety

=== World War I ===
During World War I, a machine pistol version of the Steyr M1912 called the Repetierpistole M1912/P16 was produced. It used a 16-round fixed magazine loaded via 8 round stripper clips, a detachable shoulder stock and a rather large exposed semi-auto/full-auto selector switch on the right side of the frame above the trigger (down = semi & up = full). It fired the 9×23mm Steyr cartridge, with a full-auto rate-of-fire of about 800 to 1,000 rounds per minute (RPM). It weighed about 2.6 pounds. Introduced in 1916, it is considered one of the world's first full-auto capable pistols. Only 960 M1912/P16 were made.

An automatic version of the Frommer Stop pistol was also tested, including a variant known as the Doppelpistole where two guns were joined together and mounted upside down on a tripod.

In 1916, Heinrich Senn of Bern designed a modification of the Swiss Luger pistol to fire in single shots or in full-automatic. Around the same time Georg Luger demonstrated a similar Luger machine-pistol which inspired the German Army to develop submachine guns.

=== 1920s–1930s ===
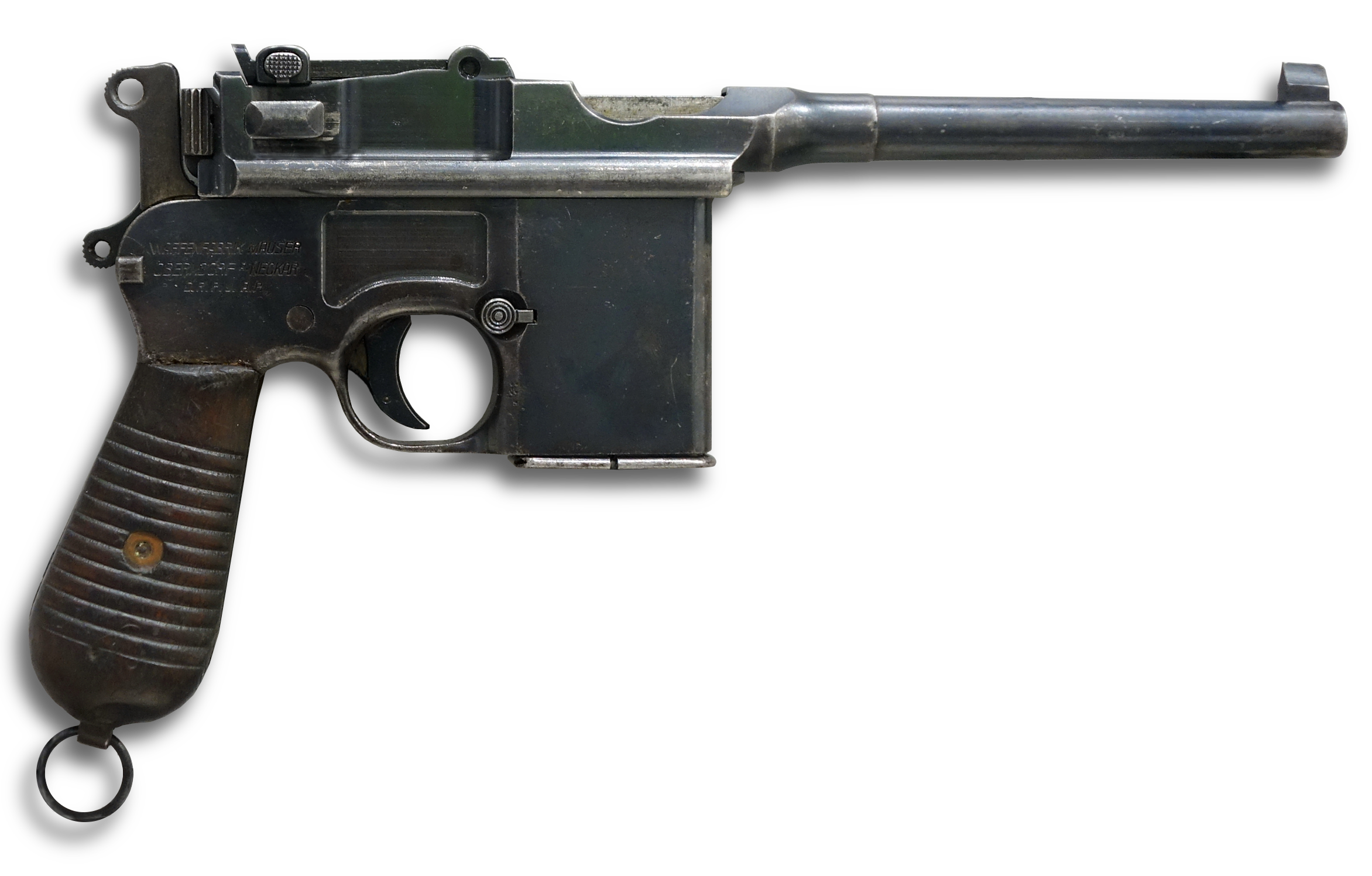
Mauser Schnellfeuer machine pistol

The Mauser C96 was introduced in 1896, it being one of the first commercially successful and practical semi-automatic pistols. During World War I, the Germans experimented with machine pistols by converting both 7.63mm Mauser and 9 mm Parabellum semi-automatic C96 pistols to full-auto. In the late 1920s, Spanish gunmakers expanded upon this idea by introducing select fire copies of the C96 with 20-round detachable magazines. In the early 1930s, Mauser engineers finally followed suit, and introduced the Model 1932 or Model 712 Schnellfeuer variant, which also included 20 round detachable magazines and a select fire mechanism allowing for fully automatic fire at a rate of 1,000 RPM.

=== World War II ===
During World War II, machine pistol development was more or less ignored as the major powers were focused on mass-producing submachine guns. Mauser Model 1932 or Model 712 Schnellfeuer variant was used mainly by Waffen-SS personnel.

=== 1950s–1960s ===
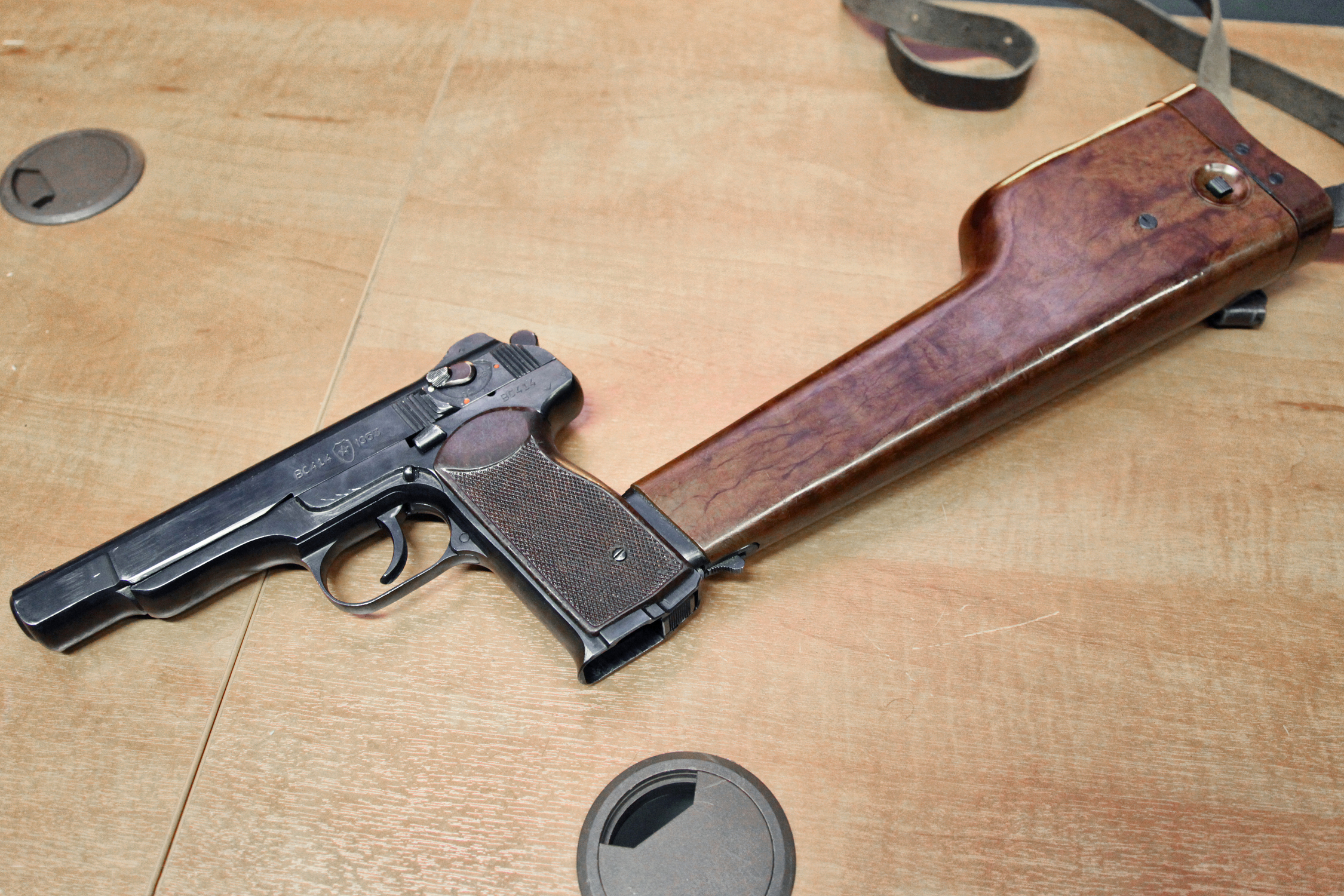
Stechkin APS machine pistol

The 9×18mm Makarov Stechkin automatic pistol (APS) is a Russian select-fire machine pistol introduced into the Russian army in 1951. Like the other common Russian army pistol of this era, the Makarov, the Stechkin uses a simple unlocked blowback mechanism and the double action trigger. What makes the Stechkin APS a machine pistol is that it has an automatic fire mode, which is selected using the safety lever. In burst or automatic fire, the pistol should be fitted with the wooden shoulder stock; otherwise, the weapon quickly becomes uncontrollable. The Stechkin was intended as a sidearm for artillery soldiers and tank crews, but in practice, it ended up earning a strong following in the ranks of political and criminal police forces. Many KGB and GRU operatives favored the Stechkin for its firepower and 20-round magazine.

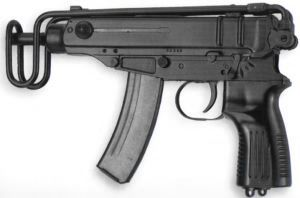
Czechoslovak Škorpion vz. 61

The Škorpion vz. 61 is a Czechoslovak 7.65 mm or .32 ACP machine pistol developed in 1959 and produced from 1961 to 1979. Although it was developed for use with security and special forces, the weapon was also accepted into service with the Czechoslovak Army, as a personal sidearm for lower-ranking army staff, vehicle drivers, armored vehicle personnel and special forces. The Skorpion's lower-powered .32 ACP cartridge, coupled with a rate-of-fire limiting device housed in the grip (which allows a reasonable rate of 850 RPM with a relatively light bolt), also makes it easier to control in full-auto than the more common 9 mm Parabellum designs. Currently the weapon is in use with the armed forces of several countries as a sidearm. The Škorpion was also license-built in Yugoslavia, designated M84.

The Beretta M1951R was based on the 9 mm Parabellum Beretta M1951 pistol and produced during the 1960s in response to a request made by the Italian special forces. The primary difference between the M951R and the original M1951 lay in the fire selector lever mounted on the right side of the weapon's frame, enabling either semi-automatic or continuous fire – labelled "SEM" and "AUT", respectively. Additionally, the weapon has a heavier slide, a folding wooden forward grip, an extended barrel and an extended magazine, increasing the capacity to 10 rounds.

=== 1970s–1980s ===
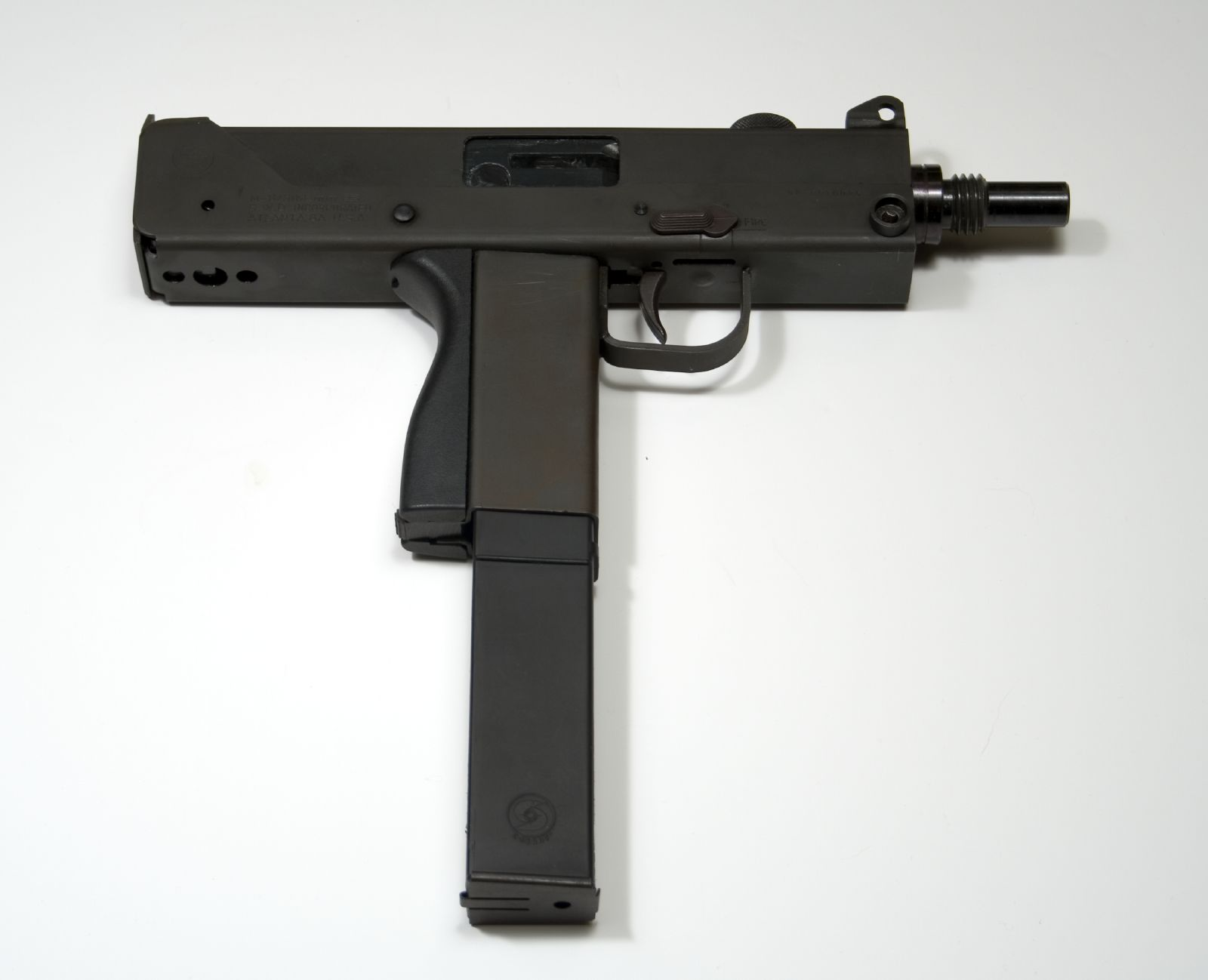
MAC-11, a compact version of the MAC-10

The MAC-10 and MAC-11 were 1970s blowback-designed weapons with the magazine carried in the pistol grip and a select-fire switch. The .45 ACP MAC-10 had a rate of fire of 1,100 RPM, and the 9×19mm version 1,200-1,500 RPM. The MAC-11 could also fire 1,200-1,500 RPM with its lighter .380 ACP cartridges. These guns were designed by Gordon Ingram and Military Armament Corporation in the US. The weapons were used in special operations and covert applications in Vietnam and by Brazilian anti-terrorist units, most people fitting it with a silencer using its threaded barrel. While some sources call the MAC-10 and MAC-11 machine pistols, the guns are also referred to as compact submachine guns.

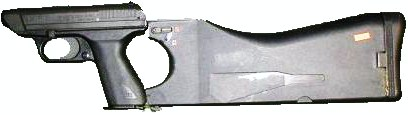
H&K VP70 select-fire machine pistol with shoulder stock

Since it is difficult to control machine pistols when they are fired in fully automatic mode, some manufacturers developed an "intermittent-fire" setting that fires a burst of three rounds instead of a continuous stream. The first of these guns is the Heckler & Koch VP70, the 70 designating the year of origin; 1970. That is a 9 mm Parabellum, 18-round, double action only, select fire-capable polymer frame pistol. It is the first polymer-framed pistol, predating the Glock 17. The stock incorporates the semi-auto/three-round burst selector, therefore it will only fire a three-round burst with the stock attached. Cyclic rounds per minute for the three-round bursts is 2,200 RPM. Despite the VP70's potential, it was never adopted by the Bundeswehr.

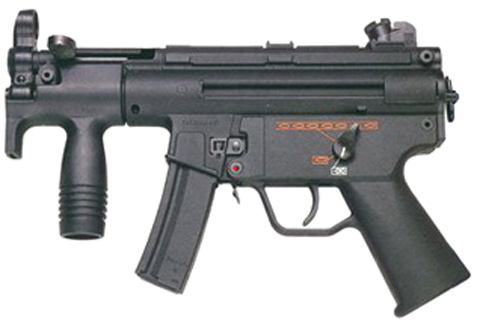
H&K MP5K, a machine pistol version of the MP5

In 1976, a shortened version of the 9 mm Parabellum Heckler & Koch MP5 was introduced; the MP5K (K from the German Kurz = "short") was designed for close quarters battle use by clandestine operations and special services. The MP5K does not have a shoulder stock, and the bolt and receiver were shortened at the rear. The resultant lighter bolt led to a higher rate of fire than the standard MP5 (900-1000 RPM vs. 800). The barrel, cocking handle and its cover were shortened and a vertical foregrip was used to replace the standard handguard. The barrel ends at the base of the front sight, which prevents the use of any sort of muzzle device.

Another popular machine pistol using the three-shot burst system is the 9 mm Parabellum Beretta Model 93R. Introduced in 1979 the Beretta Model 93R, it is a select-fire machine pistol meant for police and military use. It offered extra firepower in a smaller package and is suited for concealed carry purposes such as VIP protection, or for close quarters maneuvers such as room-to-room searches. A selector switch and the foldable foregrip allow the pistol to fire three-round bursts with each trigger pull for a cyclic rate of 1100 rounds per minute. The designers limited it to three round bursts for ease of control. A 20-round magazine and a metal shoulder stock may also be fitted.

The Stechkin APS made a comeback in the late 1970s when Russian Spetsnaz special forces units in Afghanistan used the suppressor-equipped APB variant for clandestine missions in enemy territory, such as during the Soviet–Afghan War.

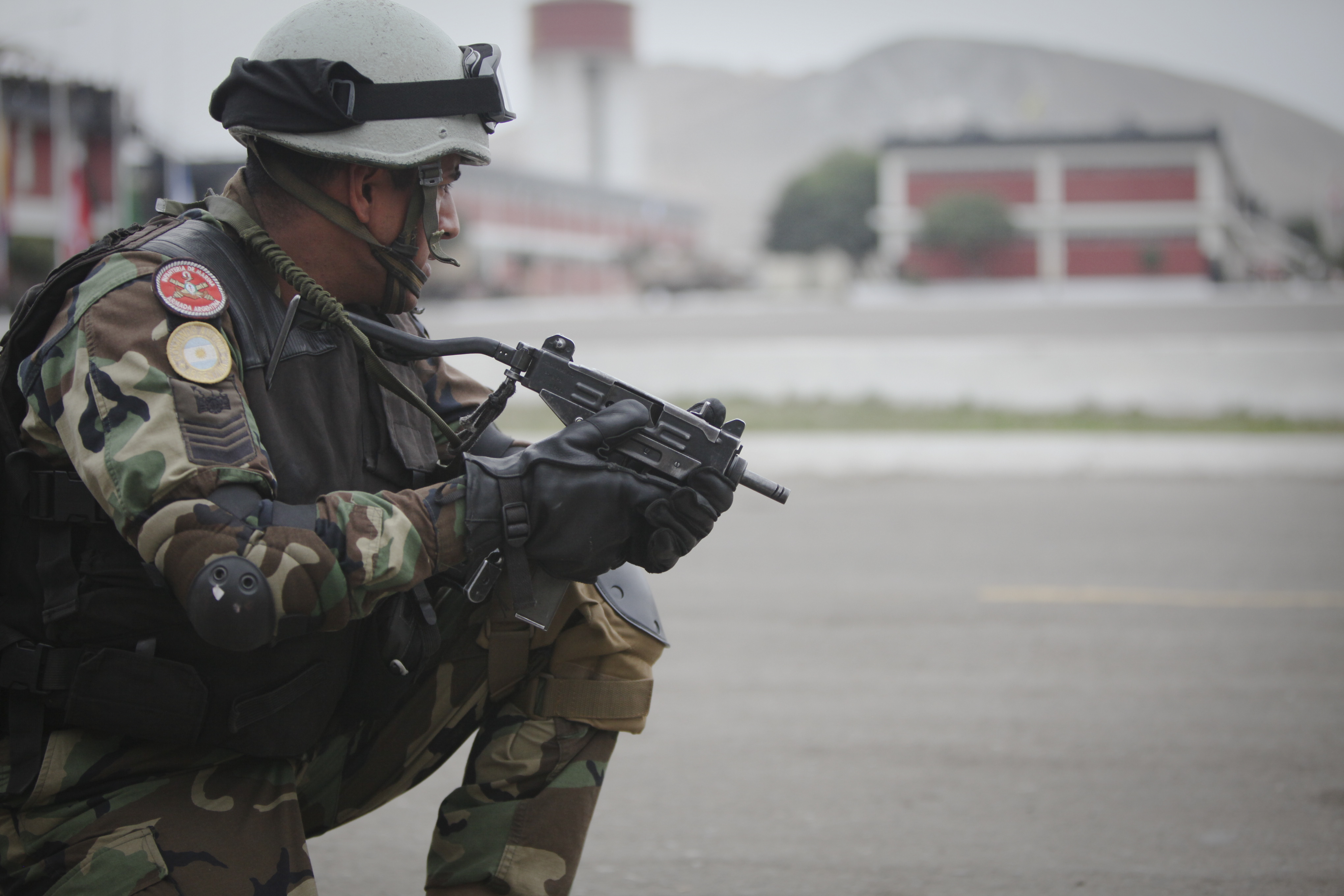
Argentine special forces with a Micro UZI

The 9 mm Parabellum Micro Uzi is a scaled-down version of the Uzi submachine gun, first introduced in 1983. It is 460 mm (18.11 inches) long with the stock extended, and just 250 mm (9.84 inches) long with the stock folded. Its barrel length is 117 mm and its muzzle velocity is 350 m/s. Used by the Israeli Isayeret and the US Secret Service, Micro-Uzis are available in open-bolt or closed-bolt versions. The weapon has an additional tungsten weight on the bolt to slow the rate of fire, which would otherwise make such a lightweight weapon uncontrollable.

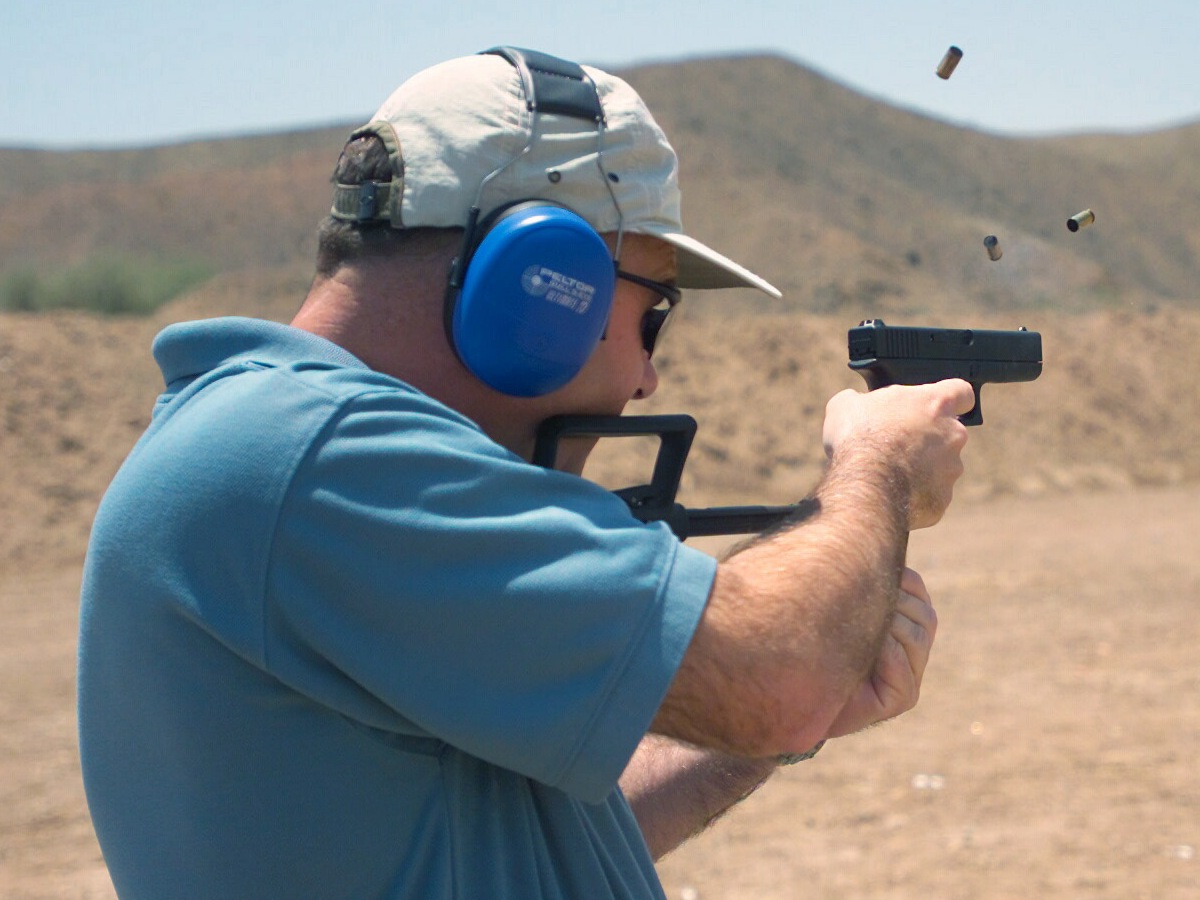
Man firing a fully automatic 9×19mm Glock 18 machine pistol with a shoulder stock

The 9 mm Parabellum Glock 18 is a select-fire variant of the Glock 17, developed in 1986 at the request of the Austrian counter-terrorist unit EKO Cobra. This machine pistol has a lever-type select-fire switch, installed on the left side, at the rear of the serrated portion of the slide (selector lever in the bottom position for continuous fire, top setting for single fire). The firearm is typically used with an extended 33-round capacity magazine and may be fired with or without a shoulder stock. The pistol's rate of fire in fully automatic mode is approximately 1,100–1,400 RPM.

=== 1990s–2000s ===
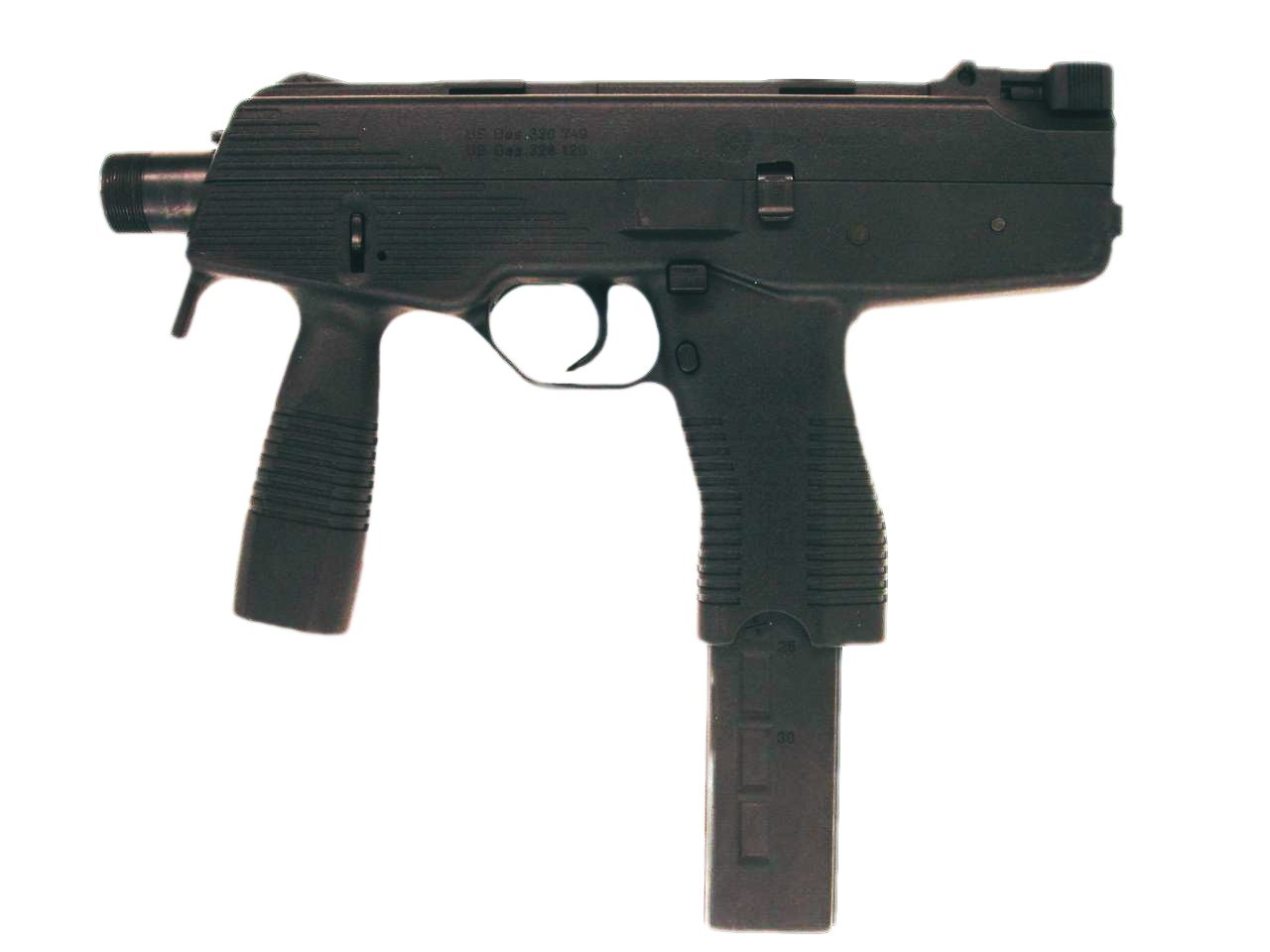
Steyr TMP machine pistol

Introduced in 1992, the Steyr TMP (Taktische Maschinenpistole "tactical machine pistol") is a select-fire 9×19mm Parabellum machine pistol manufactured by Steyr Mannlicher of Austria. The magazines come in 15-, 20-, 25-, or 30-round detachable box types. A suppressor can also be fitted.

Also introduced in 1992, the 9 mm Parabellum CZ 75 AUTOMATIC is the full-auto version of the CZ75. It has a longer barrel with three vent ports. This machine pistol has a horizontal rail in front of the trigger guard through which a spare 16- or 20-round magazine can be attached and be used as a fore-grip for better control during full automatic firing.

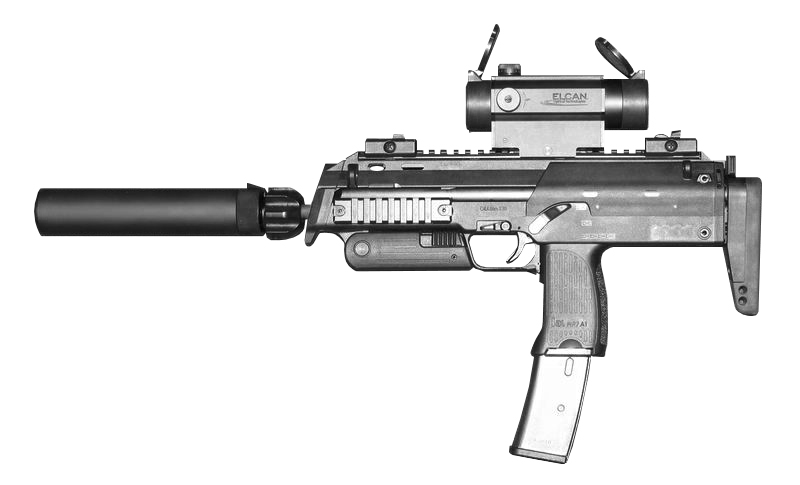
Heckler & Koch MP7A1

During the 1990s, the Russian Stechkin APS was once again put into service, as a weapon for VIP bodyguards and for anti-terrorist hostage rescue teams that needed the capability for full automatic fire in emergencies.

Developed in the 1990s and 2000s, the personal defense weapon (PDW), a compact submachine gun-like firearm which can fire armor-piercing, higher-powered ammunition, began to replace the machine pistol as a self-defense side arm for artillery crews, tank crews, and helicopter pilots. Introduced in 2001, the Heckler & Koch MP7 is often called a machine pistol, despite it being a PDW. The MP7 uses a short-stroke piston gas system as used on H&K's G36 and HK416 assault rifles, in place of a blowback system traditionally seen on machine pistols. The MP7 uses 20-, 30- and 40-round magazines and fires 4.6×30mm ammunition which can penetrate soft body armor. Due to the heavy use of polymers in its construction, the MP7 is much lighter than older designs, only 1.2 kg (2.65 lb) with an empty 20-round magazine.

== Comparison with compact submachine guns ==
The dividing line between machine pistols and compact submachine guns is difficult to determine with any precision. The term "submachine gun" usually refers to magazine-fed, fully automatic carbines designed to fire pistol cartridges, while the term "machine pistol" usually refers to fully automatic handgun based weapons. However, many weapons fall into both categories.

An example of this is the Škorpion vz. 61, often called a submachine gun. However, it is small enough to be carried in a pistol holster and so is also often referred to as a machine pistol. The MAC-10 and MAC-11 are compact and have been placed in both classes due to their sizes. The Steyr TMP (Tactical Machine Pistol) is also referred to as a compact submachine gun. Likewise, the German Heckler & Koch MP5K falls in both categories. PDWs such as the Heckler & Koch MP7 are also often called machine pistols.

The difference is also blurred by the fact that several languages use what would be literally translated as "machine pistol" as the term for submachine guns; for example the "MP" in MP 40 stands for Maschinenpistole.

== Criticisms ==
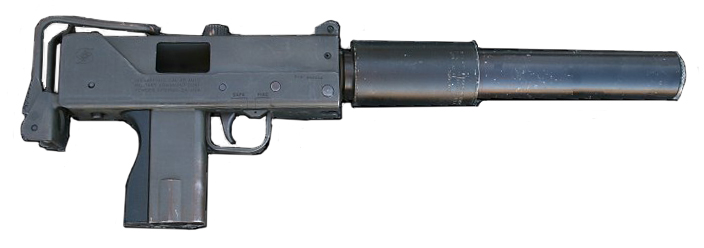
MAC-10 with a sound suppressor (shown unloaded)

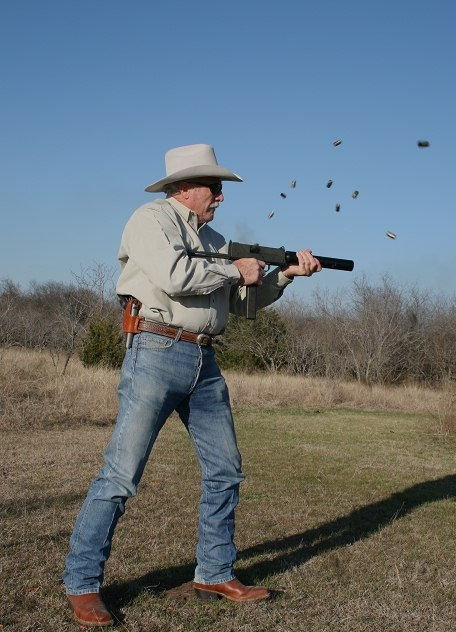
A US Marshal firing a MAC-10 machine pistol on full auto

Machine pistols are considered a special purpose weapon with limited utility. Due to their small size and high rate of fire, machine pistols are difficult to control accurately. As a result, most machine pistols are fitted with a detachable shoulder stock. Some, such as the Heckler & Koch VP70, will fire only in semi-automatic when the stock is removed because the select-fire mechanism is incorporated into the stock. The VP70 introduced a three-round-burst limiter in the same way to improve controllability. The Beretta 93R not only uses a detachable shoulder stock and a three-round-burst limiter, but also a folding forward hand-grip to improve its controllability. The MAC-10 and MAC-11 use suppressors to reduce muzzle rise, while other designs use a combination of burst limiters, forward hand-grips, ported barrels and muzzle brakes.

Gunsite, a US firearms training facility, decided against teaching machine pistol firing when it was founded in 1976. Facility experts believed that it is "a slob's weapon, useful only by half-trained or poorly motivated troops"; they claimed that the machine pistol "hits no harder than a pistol and is no more portable than a rifle." Nevertheless, even the critics from Gunsite concede that the machine pistol is useful for a few situations, such as boarding an enemy boat in low light or when repelling boarders in a naval situation. In the 1970s, International Association of Chiefs of Police weapons researcher David Steele criticized the MAC-10's accuracy when he hyperbolically described the MAC series as "Minus the suppressor and with its standard wobbly wire stock, I thought both of the MAC models were fit only for combat in a phone booth."

Walt Rauch notes that "... despite the 50 to 70 years of bad press that has accrued to the concept of shooting a hand-held machine pistol", in which critics contend that the weapon will "spray bullets indiscriminately all over the area", he believes that the 2000s-era models such as the Glock 18 are controllable and accurate in full-auto shooting. Leroy Thompson states that "...machine pistols were reasonably good for use from within a vehicle or for issue to VIP [bodyguard] drivers to give them a marginally more effective weapon during an evacuation under fire". However, he also stated that machine pistols are "...(h)ard to control in full-auto fire", which means that there is nothing that a machine pistol "...can do that other weapons available today can't do more efficiently."

== See also ==
- Glock switch
- Personal defense weapon
- Submachine gun
