= Cobray Company =

American small arms developer and manufacturer

- Type: Private
- Industry: Firearms
- Founder: Wayne Daniel; Sylvia Daniel
- Fate: Ongoing
- Successor: Leinad
- Headquarters: Westhope, North Dakota, U.S.
- Area served: Predominately U.S.
- Products: Pistols, Shotguns, Rifles, Automatic Firearms
- Website: Official website at the Wayback Machine (archived 2016-03-03)

The Cobray Company was an American developer and manufacturer of submachine guns, automatic carbines, handguns, shotguns, and non-lethal 37 mm launchers. These were manufactured by SWD. In the 1970s and 1980s, Cobray was a counterterrorist training center in addition to being an arms maker under the leadership of Mitch WerBell.

== Cobray models ==
- M-10 (.45 ACP/9mm), semi and full auto (146 mm (5.7 in) or 127 mm (5.0 in) barrel)
- M-11 (.380 ACP), semi and full auto (127 mm (5.0 in) barrel)
- M11-A1 (.380 ACP), an open bolt version of the M-11
- M-11/9 (9mm), semi and full auto (127 mm (5.0 in) barrel)
- M-12 (.380 ACP), semi-auto only
- S12ES Mk3/Mk4/Mk5/Automatic Carbine, semi-auto only
- Pocket Pal (.22 Long Rifle/.380 ACP), a dual-barrel, switch-cylinder, top-break revolver
- Terminator (12 or 20-gauge), a slam fire, single-shot shotgun
- Street Sweeper (12-gauge), a clone of the Armsel Striker
- Ladies Home Companion (.410 bore or .45-70), a reduced caliber version of the Street Sweeper
- Cobray/FMJ Ducktown (.22 Long Rifle/.45 Colt-.410 bore), an over-under derringer
- Cobray CM-11 (9mm), a carbine version of the M-11

== Legal issues ==
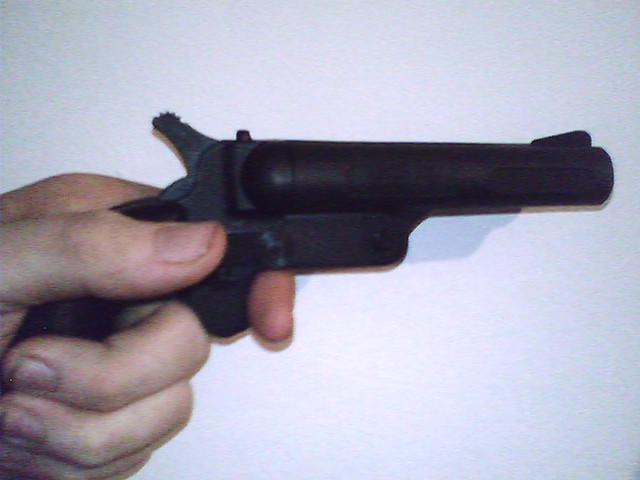
A .357 Magnum derringer

After some legal troubles, the company changed its name to Leinad (Daniel spelled backwards) and produced at least four new models which were designed to conform with the ban in the US on assault weapons that was then in effect.

=== Leinad models ===
- PM-11/9 (9mm)
- PM-12 (.380 ACP)
- DBD38357 (.357 Magnum/.38 Special)-Double Barrel (Pictured right)
- DBD41045 (.45 Long Colt/.410 bore)-Double Barrel
- Six shot (manual rotation) .22 LR derringer
- Model MR-5 shot manual rotation .45 Long Colt/.410 bore Pepper-box revolver derringer
- Model D (.45 Long Colt/.410 bore) single-shot derringer
