= PP-91 Kedr =

PP-91 KEDR
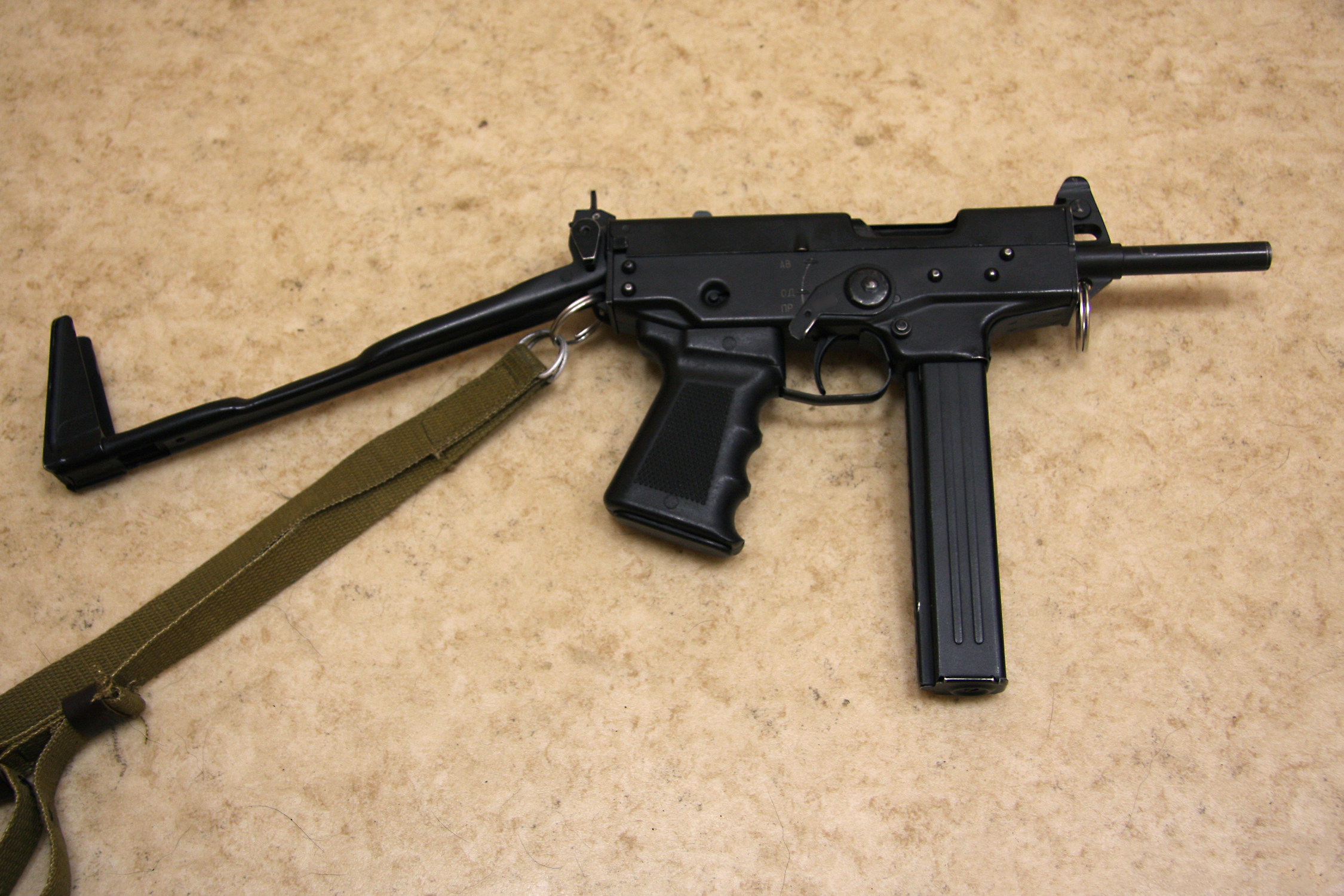
- PP-91 Kedr
- Type: Machine pistol Submachine gun
- Place of origin: Soviet Union

Service history
- In service: 1994–present
- Used by: MVD; FSKN; FSIN

Production history
- Designer: Yevgeny Dragunov
- Designed: 1970s
- Manufacturer: Izhmash Zlatoust Machine-Building Plant (PP-91 KEDR)
- Produced: 1994–present
- Variants: See Variants

Specifications
- Mass: 1.57 kg (3.46 lb) (PP-91 KEDR); 1.54 kg (3.4 lb) (PP-9 Klin)
- Length: 530 mm (20.9 in) stock extended / 305 mm (12.0 in) stock folded (PP-91 KEDR); 539 mm (21.2 in) stock extended / 305 mm (12.0 in) stock folded (PP-9 Klin); 671 mm (26.4 in) (KEDR-B)
- Barrel length: 120 mm (4.7 in)
- Cartridge: 9×18mm Makarov
- Action: Straight blowback (PP-91 KEDR); Delayed blowback (PP-9 Klin)
- Rate of fire: 1,000 rounds/min (PP-91 KEDR); 975–1,060 rounds/min (PP-9 Klin)
- Muzzle velocity: 310 m/s (1,017 ft/s) (PP-91 KEDR); 430 m/s (1,410.8 ft/s) (PP-9 Klin)
- Effective firing range: 70 m (PP-91 KEDR)
- Maximum firing range: 200 m (PP-91 KEDR)
- Feed system: 20, 30-round detachable box magazine
- Sights: Front blade, rear notch

The PP-91 Kedr is a 9mm machine pistol developed from a prototype from the 1970s and since 1994 adopted by the Russian Ministry of Internal Affairs.

== Overview ==
The PP-91 is a simply designed, easy to manufacture selective fire submachine gun designed by Yevgeny Dragunov (the designer of the SVD sniper rifle).

It is blowback operated and fires from a closed bolt, allowing for more accurate shooting than would be possible from an open bolt design. Ammunition is fed from a double column box magazine and it is supplied with folding shoulder stock.

Despite the small caliber of the round it uses, the notable advantages of the PP-91 are its compact size and the weight of only 1.5 kg, making it very easy to carry, and can be fired effectively by only one hand. The safety/selector lever is located on the right hand side and allows for semi-automatic single shots and fully automatic fire at the rate of 800 rounds per minute. The effective range of the PP-91 is between 50-100m. The weapon uses a diopter sight and allows for the use of a laser sight and a suppressor.

== Variants ==
- PP-71 (ПП-71) - a prototype SMG developed for the Ministry of Defense in the framework of the ROC "Bouquet" and tested in 1969–1972. Not commercially produced.
- PP-91-01 "Kedr-B" (ПП-91-01 «Кедр-Б») - SMG with an integrated silencer, chambered for 9×18mm Makarov
- PP-9 "Klin" (ПП-9 "Клин") chambered for 9×18mm Makarov, produced in 1996–2002. for the Interior Ministry. It features improved ballistics (due to a more powerful cartridge), the increased weight of the gate and the presence of helical grooves in the chamber.
- PP-919 "Kedr-2" (ПП-919 "Кедр-2") - was developed in 1994–1996. chambered for 9×19mm Parabellum for the Federal Tax Police Service (made 3 pcs.).
  - in 2009 was also presented a prototype of the PP-2011 "KEDR-PARA" (ПП-2011 "КЕДР-PARA") chambered for 9×19mm 7N21.
- PKSK (ПКСК) - semi-automatic carbine version chambered for 9×17 mm K, designed for private security, with a 10-round magazine. Produced in small batches since April 1998.
- KMO-9 "Korsak" (КМО-9 "Корсак") - prototype semi-automatic version with a long barrel chambered for 9×21mm. Designed as a civilian sporting and hunting weapons training.
- PST "Corporal" (ПСТ "Капрал") - semi-automatic version for private security agencies chambered for the 10 × 23mm T cartridge, with a 10-round magazine.
- PDT-9T "Yesaul" (ПДТ-9Т "Есаул") - semi-automatic version chambered for the non-lethal 9mm P.A., with a 10-round magazine (available since 2005).
  - "Yesaul-2" ("Есаул-2") - a prototype full-automatic version chambered for the non-lethal 9mm P.A., with a 20-round magazine
- PDT-13T "Yesaul-3" (ПДТ-13Т "Есаул-3") - semi-automatic version chambered for the non-lethal .45 Rubber, with a 10-round magazine (designed in 2009)
- "Kedr-MD" (Кедр-МД) - sub-machine gun to fire only blank cartridges, designed to order by the film concern "Mosfilm" in 2006. Only 5 were made.
- KSO-9 "Krechet" (КСО-9 "Кречет") - semi-automatic civilian carbine variant with long barrel, AR-15 type stock, 10-round magazines and chambered for the 9×19mm cartridge. Saw limited production in 2014–2015; very few were made.

== Users ==
- Russia: MVD (politsiya and OMON) and security guards

== See also ==
- List of Russian weaponry
- Škorpion vz. 61
- OTS-02 Kiparis
