= OTs-27 Berdysh =

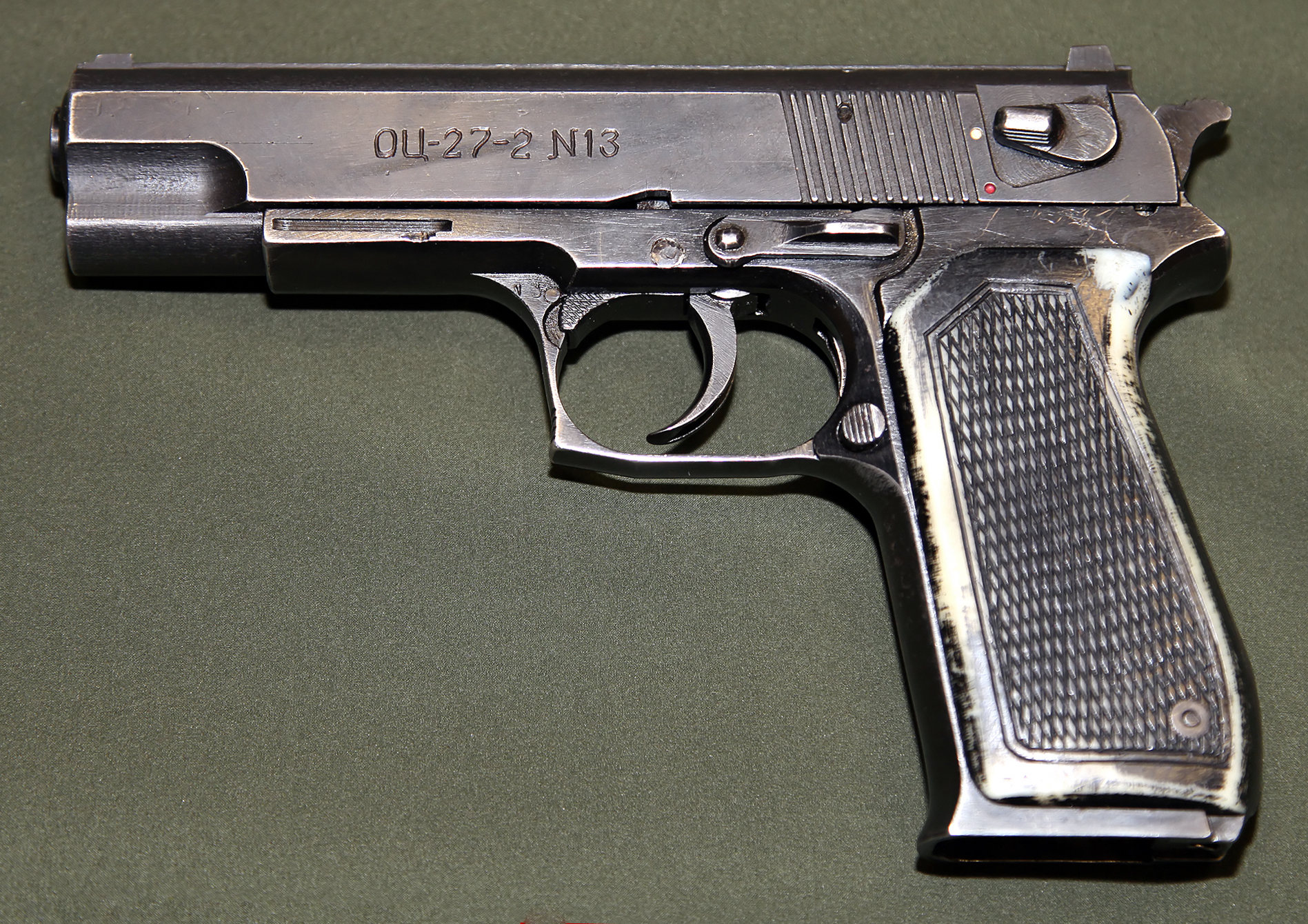
- ОЦ-27 Бердыш
- Type: Semi-automatic pistol
- Place of origin: Russia

Service history
- In service: 2002
- Used by: Russia

Production history
- Designer: TsKIB SOO
- Designed: 1994
- Manufacturer: KBP Instrument Design Bureau
- Produced: 1994
- Variants: OTs-27, OTs-27-2

Specifications
- Mass: 930 g (33 oz)
- Length: 200 mm (7.9 in)
- Barrel length: 125 mm (4.9 in)
- Width: 35 mm (1.4 in)
- Height: 143 mm (5.6 in)
- Cartridge: 9×18mm Makarov; 9×19mm Parabellum; 7.62×25mm Tokarev
- Action: Blowback
- Feed system: 18-round detachable box magazine for 7.62mm cartridges, 15-round detachable box magazine for 9mm cartridges
- Sights: Fixed; front blade and rear notch

The OTs-27 Berdysh (Russian: ОЦ-27 Бердыш, lit. 'Bardiche') is a Russian semi-automatic pistol developed in the early 1990s by TsKIB SOO as a candidate to replace the standard Makarov PM service pistol in service with the Russian Armed Forces.

== Variants ==
- PSA (ПСА, «пистолет конструкции Стечкина — Авраамова») - test prototype
- OTs-27 (ОЦ-27) - 9×18mm Makarov
- OTs-27-2 (ОЦ-27-2) - 9×19mm Parabellum
- OTs-27-7 (ОЦ-27-7) - 7.62×25mm Tokarev

== Users ==
- Russia - used as service pistol in Ministry of Internal Affairs and other law enforcement

== Sources ==
- К. Тесемников. Современный "Бердыш" // журнал "Оружейный двор", № 9-10, 1998.
- А. И. Благовестов. То, из чего стреляют в СНГ: Справочник стрелкового оружия. / под общ. ред. А. Е. Тараса. Минск, «Харвест», 2000. стр.65-68
- А. Б. Жук. Энциклопедия стрелкового оружия: револьверы, пистолеты, винтовки, пистолеты-пулемёты, автоматы. — М.: Воениздат, 2002. стр.438-439
