= PMR grenade launcher =

- Type: Grenade projector
- Place of origin: Transnistria

Specifications
- Sights: Iron

The PMR grenade launcher is a muzzle-fired grenade launcher of Transnistrian origin. The device is inserted on the muzzles of AKS-74U rifles.
