= Yevgeny Dragunov =

Soviet weapons designer

Yevgeny F. Dragunov
- Born: Yevgeny Fyodorovich Dragunov; February 20, 1920; Izhevsk, Russian SFSR
- Died: August 4, 1991 (aged 71); Izhevsk, Soviet Union
- Occupation: firearms designer
- Known for: Helping to invent the Dragunov sniper rifle

Yevgeny Fyodorovich Dragunov (Russian: Евге́ний Фёдорович Драгуно́в; February 20, 1920 – August 4, 1991) was a Soviet weapons designer, best known for his role in helping invent the semi-automatic rifle bearing his name, the Dragunov sniper rifle.

== Early life and education ==
Coming from a family of gunsmiths, Dragunov worked as a factory machinist before beginning military service in 1939.

== Career ==
After 1941, Dragunov was a senior armorer working for the Soviet Union and also captured enemy weapons during wartime. After 1945, he returned to Izhevsk and joined the Arms Design Bureau, working as a project engineer on sporting and civilian target rifles through the 1950s. One of these, the Biathlon target rifle, went on to the Olympic Gold. In 1959, Dragunov submitted his design for a military sniper rifle, the SVD, which was accepted into Soviet military service in 1963 and later became known as the Dragunov rifle.

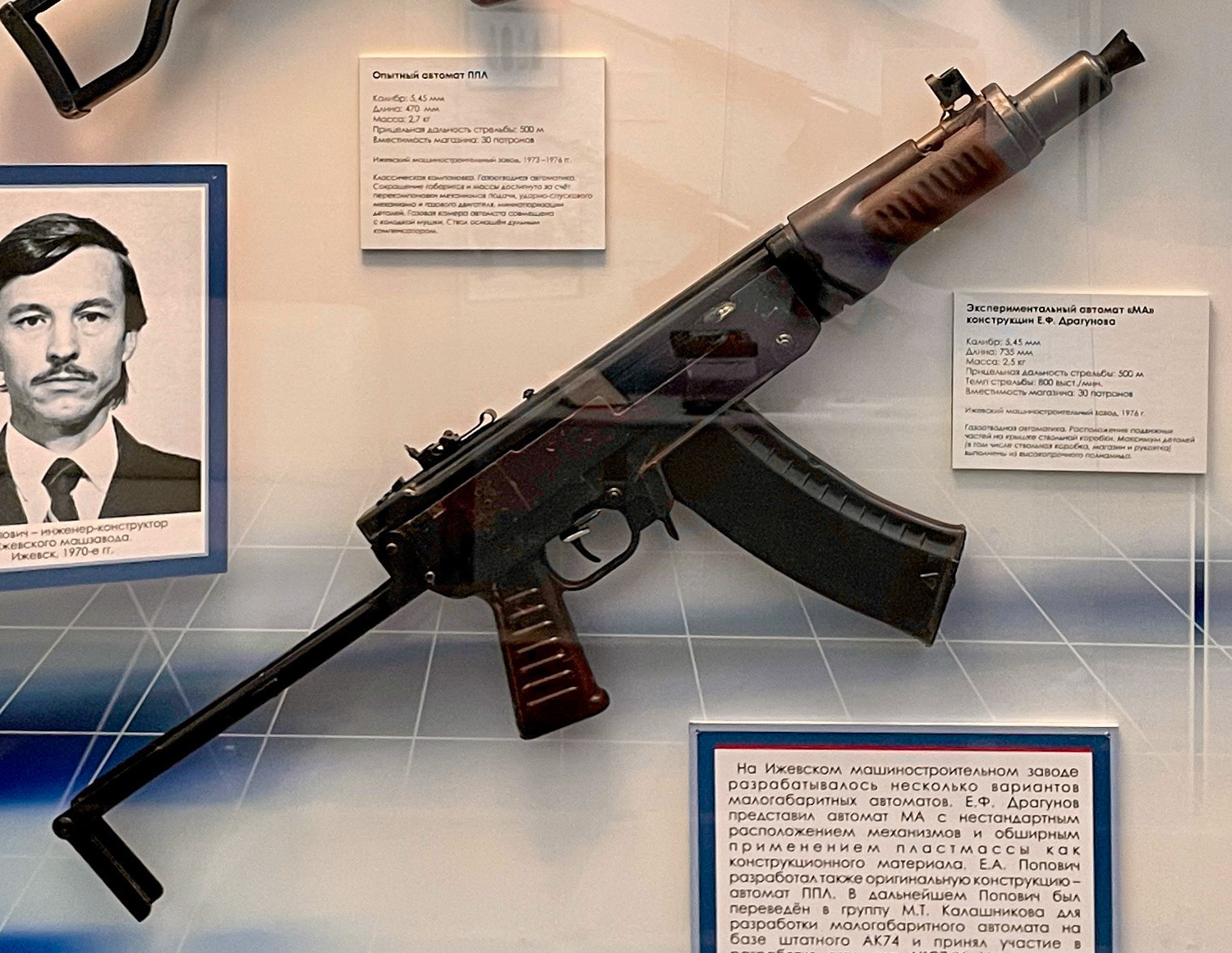
Dragunov MA

Dragunov also participated in the competition that led to the adoption of AKS-74U with a gas-operated design called MA (malokalibernii avtomat). Although Dragunov's avtomat was comparable in performance to Kalashnikov's, the latter had the advantage of sharing some parts with the AK-74 rifle already in production. The non-metallic parts of the MA were made of polyamides. The MA was Dragunov's last major design. The trigger mechanism used in the MA was fairly similar to the one previously used in his PP-71 sub-machine gun.

== Awards ==
- Order of the Badge of Honour (1957)
- the Lenin Prize (1963)
- the State Prize of the Russian Federation (1992, posthumously)

== Inventions ==
- TsV-50 (ЦВ-50) - target rifle
- MTsV-50 (МЦВ-50) - target rifle
- TsV-55 "Zenith" (ЦВ-55 "Зенит") - 7.62mm target rifle
- MTsV-55 "Strela" (МЦВ-55 "Стрела") - 5.6mm target rifle
- MTsV-56 "Taiga" - 5.6mm lightweight bolt-action target rifle (in 1959 it was awarded the silver medal of the VDNKh exhibition)
- SVD - 7.62mm semi-automatic sniper rifle
- PP-91 "Kedr" - 9x18mm submachine gun
