= Gepard (submachine gun) =

Russian multi-cartridge submachine gun

- Type: Submachine gun
- Place of origin: Russia

Production history
- Designed: 1995

Specifications
- Mass: 2 kg
- Length: 640mm 420mm folded
- Barrel length: 235mm
- Cartridge: .380 ACP; 9×18mm Makarov; 9×19mm 9×19mm 7N21; 9×21mm 9×21mm Gyurza; 9×30mm Grom
- Rate of fire: 600-700 rounds/min
- Feed system: 22 or 40-round double stack magazine
- Sights: Adjustable iron sights for 100m and 200m

The Gepard (Cyrillic: Гепард, Cheetah) is a Russian submachine gun developed by the military unit 33491 and JSC REX, first designed in 1995 and presented in Moscow in 1997. The gun was developed as an answer to a shortage of 9mm submachine guns.

== Development ==
Developed from the AKS-74U, the Gepard has a 65% parts commonality; it can use the .380 ACP, 9×18mm Makarov, 9×19mm Parabellum, 9×19mm 7N21, 9×21mm and 9×21mm Gyurza without a change and can use the 9×30mm Grom cartridge with a chamber replacement. The gun can use different mechanisms of action:

- blowback
- blowback with 2 inertial masses
- blowback with 2 inertial masses and partial use of the gas from the barrel
- delayed blowback
- typical Kalashnikov long-stroke piston with rotating bolt

The receiver is shorter compared to other Kalashnikov platforms, so a special counter-balancing system can be used. Various barrel accessories such as muzzle brakes, flash hiders and suppressors can be attached to the barrel. The double-stack magazine presses the rounds against the front wall. Unusual for Kalashnikov rifles, the magazine is placed inside the grip similar to the Uzi, and the grip is made from polymer.

== See also ==
- PP-19-01 Vityaz
- Zastava Master FLG
