= SR-1 Vektor =

Russian semi-automatic pistol

SR-1 Vektor, P-9 Gurza
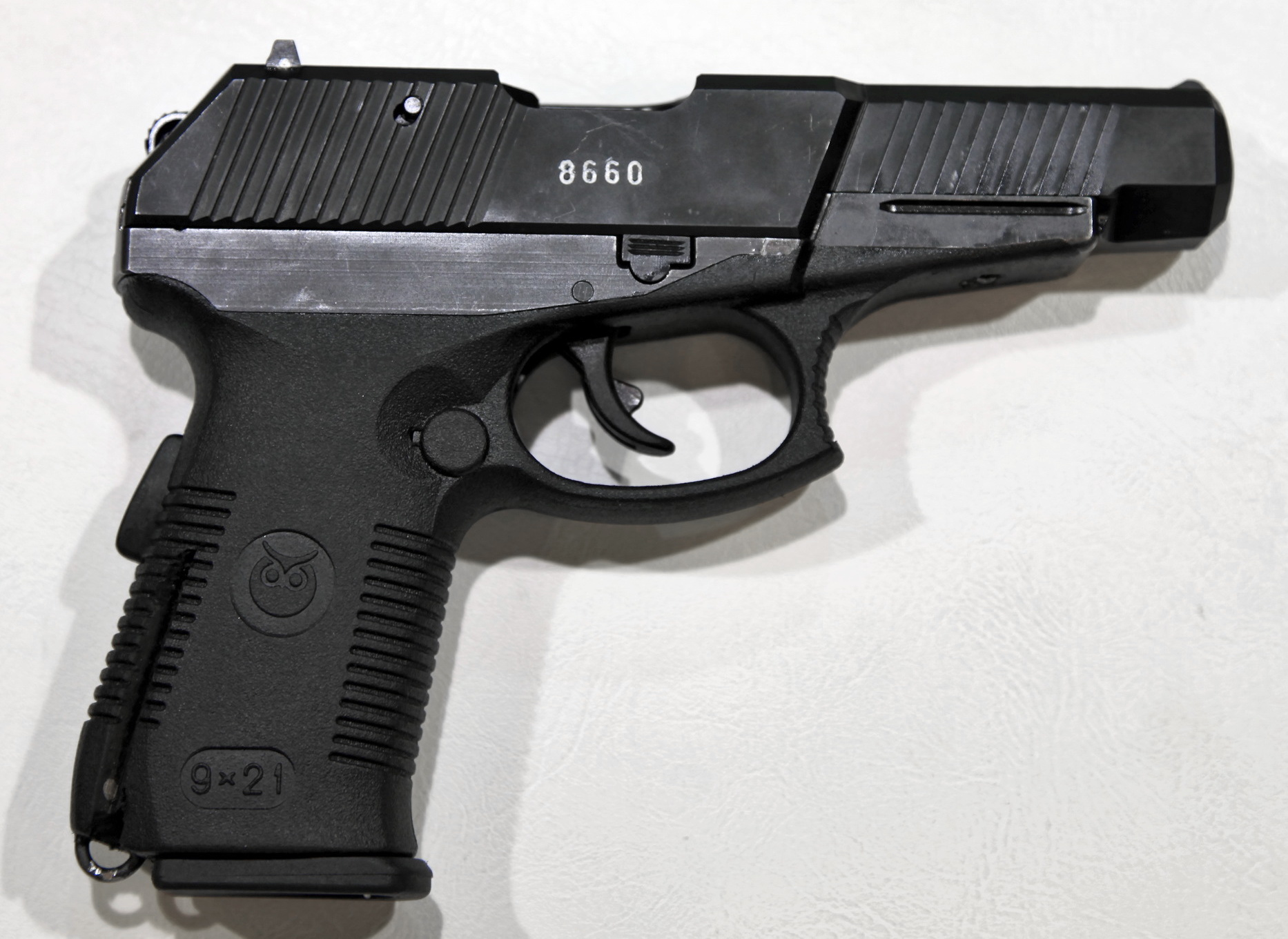
- 9 mm SR1PM pistol
- Type: Semi-automatic pistol
- Place of origin: Russia

Production history
- Designed: early 1990s
- Manufacturer: TsNIITochMash Institute
- Produced: 1996–2005 (early generation); 2005–present (new generation)
- Variants: See Variants

Specifications
- Mass: 950 g (2.09 lb)
- Length: 195 mm (7.7 in)
- Barrel length: 112 mm (4.4 in)
- Cartridge: 9×21mm Gyurza
- Action: DA/SA Semi-automatic, Short recoil with dropping block, blow back operation.
- Muzzle velocity: 420 m/s (1,400 ft/s)
- Effective firing range: 50 m (55 yd)
- Maximum firing range: 100 m (110 yd)
- Feed system: 18-round detachable box magazine
- Sights: Irons - fixed blade front and fixed rectangular notch rear

The SR-1 Vektor, also known as the Gyurza (Гюрза, Russian for "blunt-nosed viper") or Serdyukov SPS, is a semi-automatic pistol.

== Design ==
The operating system is based on the Beretta 92, utilizing a dropping block.

The frame is polymer and steel. While the SR-1 does not have a traditional manual safety, it is equipped with a grip safety that disengages the trigger mechanism, as well as a trigger safety to prevent fire when the trigger is not depressed.

Additionally the hammer must also be placed into half-cock to engage the sear and enable double action firing.

The SR-1 pistol is chambered in 9×21mm Gyurza, a specialised cartridge also used by the SR-2 Veresk submachine gun designed for the Russian military.

== Variants ==
=== SR-1M ===
The SR-1M variant redesigns and modernizes the handguns frame, adds a lanyard loop behind the magazine, and enlarges the grip safety device for easier usage.

=== SR-1MP ===
The SR-1MP variant is a further modernization kit of the SR-1M which adds two additional grooves onto the dust cover allowing for the user to mount a Picatinny rail adapter onto the lower dust cover section of the firearm for adding accessories such as flashlights or laser sight system.

This kit also comes with a threaded barrel to allow the option of attaching a quick detach suppressor. It is currently being supplied.

=== SR-1PM ===
The SR-1PM is a fundamental redesign of the SR-1MP for blow back operation.

The redesign includes a heavier slide with larger stirrations, removal of the locking wedge, and changes to the take down lever. These design changes were instituted to allow for the handgun's usage with training ammunition.

== Users ==
- Kyrgyzstan
  - Armed Forces of the Kyrgyz Republic
- Russia

- Russian Federal Protective Service
- Federal Security Service
- GRU (G.U.)
- Special Rapid Response Unit
- OMON

== Sources ==
- А. И. Благовестов. То, из чего стреляют в СНГ: Справочник стрелкового оружия. / под общ.ред. А. Е. Тараса. Минск, «Харвест», 2000. стр.69-71
- А. Б. Жук. Энциклопедия стрелкового оружия: револьверы, пистолеты, винтовки, пистолеты-пулемёты, автоматы. — М.: Воениздат, 2002.
- https://www.youtube.com/watch?v=5dK8EfQ4P6U
