= 9×30mm Grom =

Russian munition

- Place of origin: Russia

Production history
- Designed: 1992–1993

Specifications
- Parent case: 9x19mm
- Case type: Rimless, tapered
- Bullet diameter: 9.02 mm (0.355 in)
- Land diameter: 8.82 mm (0.347 in)value from 9×19mm
- Neck diameter: 9.65 mm (0.380 in)value from 9×19mm
- Base diameter: 9.93 mm (0.391 in)value from 9×19mm
- Rim diameter: 9.96 mm (0.392 in)value from 9×19mm
- Rim thickness: 1.27 mm (0.050 in)value from 9×19mm
- Case length: 30.05–30.20 mm (1.183–1.189 in)
- Overall length: 40.8–41.1 mm (1.61–1.62 in)
- Case capacity: 1.43cm^{3}, with bullet inserted 1.11cm^{3}
- Maximum pressure: 260 MPa (38,000 psi)
- Filling weight: 0.88–1.05 g

Ballistic performance
Bullet mass/type	Velocity	Energy
6.42–6.55 g (99–101 gr) Standard	600–610 m/s (2,000–2,000 ft/s)	1,155.6–1,218.6 J (852.3–898.8 ft⋅lbf)
6.70–6.74 g (103–104 gr) Armor piercing	590–600 m/s (1,900–2,000 ft/s)	1,166.1–1,213.2 J (860.1–894.8 ft⋅lbf)
- Test barrel length: Gepard (submachine gun); Source

The 9×30mm Grom (Гром., Russian for Thunder) is a Russian round developed between 1992 and 1993, designed for the Gepard (submachine gun), it answers the need to defeat 6B2 body armor at a range of 100 meters.

== Development ==
A regular and an armor piercing variant were designed, the non-armor piercing bullet taken from the 9×19mm Parabellum and the armor piercing bullet was taken from the RG054 cartridge, it has a black painted tip.

The case is a stretched 9x19mm case, manufactured from phosphate varnished steel. The propellants used are pyroxylin (standard Soviet pistol powder "П-45","П-125" also used for blankfiring 5.45×39mm and 7.62×39mm) or smokeless powder consisting of spherical ellipsoids which measure from 0.45–0.75mm, resulting in powder density of 0.95g/cm^{3}.

== See also ==
- 9×23mm Winchester
- 9×25mm Mauser
- 9mm Winchester Magnum
- 9×25mm Dillon – shorter but wider 9mm bottlenecked cartridge with the same capacity
- .357 Magnum – similar rimmed cartridge
