= Makarov pistol =

Makarov Pistol
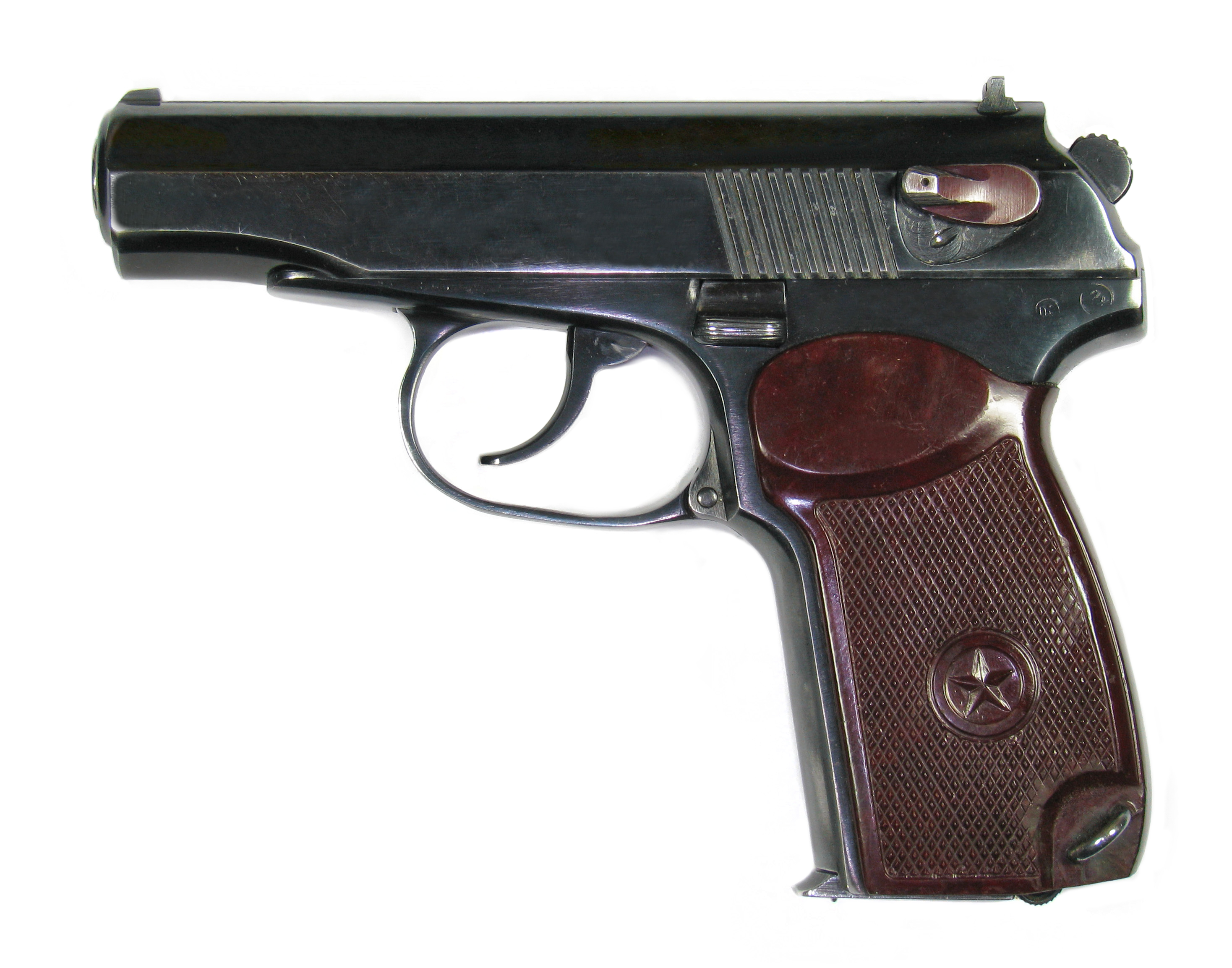
- Soviet PM
- Type: Semi-automatic pistol
- Place of origin: Soviet Union

Service history
- In service: 1951–present
- Used by: See Users
- Wars: First Indochina War; Vietnam War; Laotian Civil War; Cambodian Civil War; Communist insurgency in Thailand; Nicaraguan Revolution; Salvadoran Civil War; Lebanese Civil War; Soviet–Afghan War; South African Border War; Angolan Civil War; Tuareg rebellion (1990–1995); Burundian Civil War; First Chechen War; Second Chechen War; War in Afghanistan (2001–2021); Russo-Georgian War; Libyan Civil War; Syrian civil war War in Donbas; Colombian Conflict; Russo-Ukrainian war

Production history
- Designer: Nikolay Makarov
- Designed: 1948
- Manufacturer: Izhevsk Mechanical Plant (USSR/Russia: 1949–2013); Kalashnikov Concern (Russia: 2013–present); Ernst Thaelmann (Germany); Arsenal AD (Bulgaria); Norinco (China); Factory 626 (China)
- Produced: 1949–present
- No. built: 5,000,000
- Variants: See Variants

Specifications
- Mass: 730 g (26 oz)
- Length: 161.5 mm (6.36 in)
- Barrel length: 93.5 mm (3.68 in)
- Width: 29.4 mm (1.16 in)
- Cartridge: 9×18mm Makarov.380 Auto; 9x18mm 7N16 (PMM variant)
- Action: Blowback
- Muzzle velocity: 315 m/s (1,030 ft/s)
- Effective firing range: 50 m (55 yd)
- Feed system: 8-round detachable box magazine (10- and 12-round available on the PMM); 80-round drum magazine
- Sights: Blade front, notch rear (drift adjustable)

The Makarov Pistol (Russian: Пистолет Макарова, romanized: Pistolet Makarova, IPA: [pʲɪstɐˈlʲet mɐˈkarəvə], lit. 'Makarov's Pistol'), commonly known simply as the PM or Makarov, is a single action, semi-automatic pistol manufactured by the Russian company Kalashnikov Concern. The PM was designed by Nikolay Makarov to replace the TT pistol, becoming the standard service pistol of the Soviet Armed Forces and the Militsiya in 1951. It is chambered in the 9×18mm Makarov round which is unofficially named for the pistol.

The PM has been manufactured continuously by Izhevsk Mechanical Plant and Kalashnikov Concern in Izhevsk since 1949, while licensed copies have been produced outside of Russia. It is one of the most-produced firearms in the world, with over 5,000,000 manufactured, and is the second most-produced pistol after the Glock. It was adopted in some capacity by most Eastern Bloc and Second World states, and remains in active service in the militaries and police of these states and their successor states.

== Operational Use ==
The PM, as the new standard issue sidearm of the Soviet Union, was issued to non-commissioned officers, Militsiya officers, special forces, as well as tank and aircraft crews. It was adopted by most states in the Eastern Bloc and Second World, the exception being states with an established native arms industry such as Czechoslovakia and Poland. It remained in widespread front-line service with Soviet military and police beyond the dissolution of the Soviet Union in 1991.

In 2003, the PM was formally replaced by the MR-443 Grach in the Russian Armed Forces, and by the Ministry of Internal Affairs from 2006. However, this replacement has been very slow, with the PM yet to be entirely supplanted in the Russian military and police. As of 2015, the PMM and Grach were the service pistol of the Russian Airborne Troops. In September 2019, Rostec announced its SR-2 Udav pistol went into mass production as the Makarov replacement for the Russian Armed Forces. The Udav fires 9×21mm Gyurza rounds which are claimed to pierce 1.4 mm of titanium or 4 mm of steel at a 100 meters.

Outside of Russia, the PM is still the service pistol of many former Soviet-aligned states, including the Post-Soviet states, though the aging pistol is being gradually phased out. It is used by numerous Third World countries and non-state actors due to its ubiquity and low cost.

== Development ==
Shortly after the Second World War, the Soviet Union reactivated its plans for a new service pistol to replace the aging TT-33 (Tokarev) semi-automatic pistol and the Nagant M1895 revolver, then used by the Soviet Armed Forces and the Militsiya. The advent of the assault rifle after the war, and the subsequent adoption of the future AK-47 in 1947, relegated the pistol to a light, handy self-defense weapon. The Tokarev was considered unsuited for such a role as it was heavy and bulky for a pistol, lacked a safety, and their magazines were deemed too easy to lose. Also, Soviet soldiers had complained about the Tokarev's reliability, including incidents where the magazine would accidentally release. As a result, in December 1945, two separate contests for a new service pistol were created, respectively for a 7.62mm and 9mm calibre pistol. Special emphasis was placed on safety, user-friendliness, accuracy, weight, and dimensions. It was later judged that the new 9.2×18mm cartridge, designed by Boris Vladimirovich Semin, was the best round suited for the intended role. The lower pressures of the cartridge allowed practical straight-blowback operation, reducing the cost and complexity of the weapon while retaining low recoil and good stopping power.

Nikolay Makarov, a recent engineering graduate from the Tula Mechanical Institute, participated in the contest along with several prominent firearms engineers in the Soviet Union. Makarov's design, influenced by the German Walther PP, stood out from the others through its sheer simplicity, excellent reliability, quick disassembly, and robustness after stringent testing. During testing in April 1948, Makarov's pistol experienced 20 times fewer malfunctions than the competing Baryshev and Sevryugin counterparts, and required fewer parts. Therefore, Soviet authorities selected Makarov's design in 1949 for further development and optimization for mass production. Tooling was set up in the Izhevsk plant for production and, after many significant design changes and tweaks, it was formally adopted by the Soviet Armed Forces as the 9mm Pistolet Makarova, or PM, in December 1951.

== Design ==
The PM is heavy for its size by modern US commercial handgun standards, largely because in a blowback pistol, the heavy slide is necessary as it is relied upon to provide inertia to delay opening of the breech until internal pressures have fallen to a safe level.

Other, more powerful cartridges have been used in blowback pistol designs, but the Makarov is widely regarded as particularly well balanced in its design elements.

=== Layout ===
The general layout and field-strip procedure of the Makarov pistol is similar to that of the PP.

However, designer N. Makarov and his team drastically simplified the construction of the pistol, improving reliability and reducing the part count to 27, not including the magazine. This allowed considerable ease of manufacture and servicing.

All of the individual parts of the PM have been optimised for mass production, robustness and interchangeability, partially thanks to captured German tooling, technology, and machinery.

=== Barrel ===
The chrome-lined, four-groove, 9.27mm caliber barrel is pressed and pinned to the frame through a precision-machined ring.

The 7 kg recoil spring wraps around and is guided by the barrel. The spring-loaded trigger guard is pivoted down, allowing removal of the slide.

=== Sights ===
The front sight is integrally machined into the slide, and a 3–4 mm wide textured strip is engraved on top of the slide in order to prevent aim-disturbing glare. The rear sight is dovetailed into the slide and multiple heights are available to adjust the impact point.

=== Internal parts ===
The extractor is of an external spring-loaded type, and features a prominent flange preventing loss if a case should rupture.

The breech face is deeply recessed in order to aid in extraction and ejection reliability.

The stamped sheet steel slide-lock lever has a tail serving as the ejector.

The one-piece, wraparound bakelite or plastic grip is reinforced with steel inserts and has a detent inside the screw bushing preventing unscrewing during firing.

The sheet-metal mainspring housed inside the grip panel powers the hammer in both the main and rebound stroke, the trigger and the disconnector, while its lower end is the heel and spring of the magazine catch.

The sear spring also serves another function, powering the slide lock lever.

The PM has a free-floating triangular firing pin, with no firing pin spring or firing pin block. This theoretically allows the possibility of accidental firing if the pistol is dropped on its muzzle.

Makarov pistol parts seldom break with normal usage, and are easily serviced using few tools.

=== Accessories ===
A wide variety of aftermarket additions and replacements exist for the Makarov pistol, including replacement barrels, custom grips, custom finishes and larger sights with various properties to replace the notoriously small originals.

A scope/light mount exists for the Makarov pistol but requires a threaded replacement barrel.

== Operation ==
=== Blowback design ===
The PM is a medium-size, straight-blowback-action, all-steel construction, frame-fixed barrel handgun.

In blowback designs, the only force holding the slide closed is that of the recoil spring; upon firing, the barrel and slide do not have to unlock, as do locked-breech-design pistols.

Blowback designs are simple and more accurate than designs using a recoiling, tilting, or articulated barrel, but they are limited by the weight of the slide.

The 9×18mm cartridge is an appropriate cartridge in blowback-operated pistols; producing a respectable level of energy from a gun of moderate weight and size.

=== Trigger mechanism ===
The PM has a DA/SA trigger mechanism. Engaging the manual safety simultaneously decocks the hammer if cocked, and prevents movement of slide, trigger and hammer. Both carrying with safety engaged, or with safety disengaged and hammer uncocked are considered safe.

The DA trigger pull causes the hammer to come to the rear then releases it to go forward, firing a chambered cartridge. Racking the slide, manually cocking the hammer or firing a cartridge all cock the hammer, setting the trigger to single action for the next shot.

The PM is a semi-automatic firearm, therefore its rate of fire depends on how rapidly the shooter squeezes the trigger. Spent cartridge casings are ejected some 5.5–6 meters away to the shooter's right and rear.

After firing the last round, the slide is held back by the slide stop lever/ejector. Magazines can be removed from the gun via the heel release, located on the bottom of the grip.

After loading a fresh magazine, the slide can be released by pressing the lever on the left side of the frame or by racking the slide and releasing it; either action loads a cartridge into the chamber and readies the pistol to fire again.

=== Safety ===
The Makarov pistol is notable for the safety elements of its design, with a safety lever that simultaneously decocks and blocks the hammer from contacting the firing pin and returns the weapon to the long-trigger-pull mode of double action when that safety is engaged.

When handled properly, the Makarov pistol has excellent security against accidental discharge caused by inadvertent pressure on the trigger, e.g., in carrying the weapon in dense brush or re-holstering it.

== Variants ==
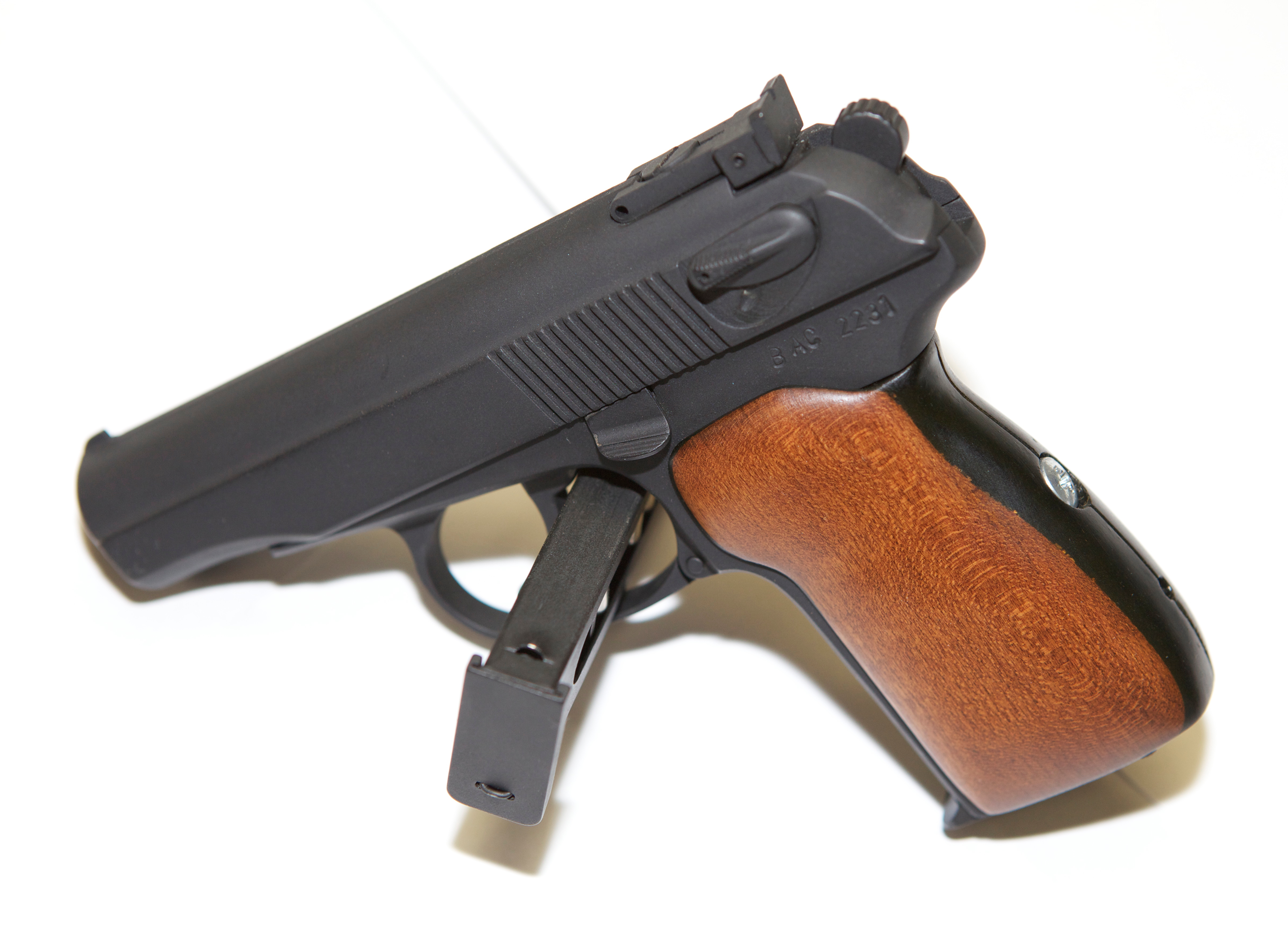
A Russian-produced Parkerized and dura-painted Makarov PM.

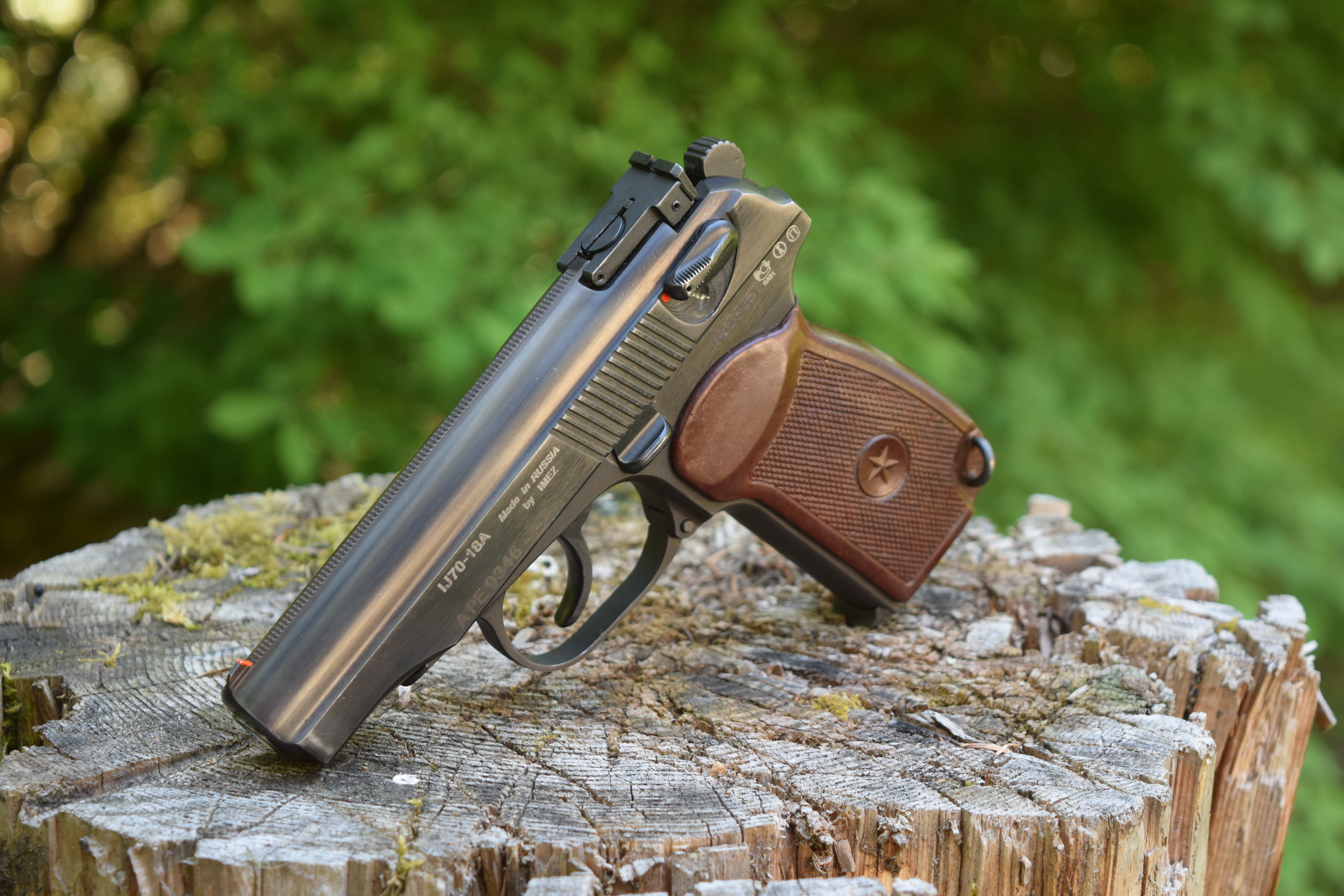
Baikal IJ70-18A Makarov

=== PMM ===
The most widely known variant, the PMM (Pistolet Makarova Modernizirovannyy or Modernised Makarov pistol), was a redesign of the original gun.

In 1990, a group of engineers reworked the original design, primarily by increasing the load for the cartridge. The result is a significant increase in muzzle velocity and generation of 25% more gas pressure.

The PMM magazine holds 12 rounds, compared to the PM's eight rounds. Versions that held ten rounds were produced in greater quantities than the 12-round magazine.

The PMM is able to use existing 9.2×18mm PM cartridges and has other minor modifications such as more ergonomic grip panels as well as flutes in the chamber that aid in extraction.

=== PB ===
A silenced version of the Makarov pistol, the PB, was developed for use by reconnaissance groups and the KGB, with a dedicated detachable suppressor.

=== TKB-023 ===
An experimental variant of the Makarov pistol, the TKB-023, was designed with a polymer frame to reduce the weight and costs of the weapon. It had passed Soviet military trials but was never fielded, due to concerns about the polymer's capacities for long-term storage and use.

=== Baikal ===
Baikal is a brand developed by Izhevsk Mechanical Plant around which a series of shotgun products were designed from 1962.

After the collapse of the USSR, commercial gun manufacture was greatly expanded under the Baikal brand.

==== IJ-70 ====
During the 1990s, Baikal marketed various Makarov-derived handguns in the United States under the IJ-70 model. Included were handguns in both standard and high-capacity frames.

They were available in .380 ACP in addition to the standard 9mm Makarov round and commercially featured a nickel finish.

Some minor modifications were made to facilitate importation into the United States, including the replacement of the rear fixed sight with an adjustable sight (only these Russian models marketed abroad feature an adjustable sight).

==== Baikal-442 ====
A sporting version is the Baikal-442. The importation of these commercial models into the U.S. was later further restricted with the U.S. Government's importation ban on Russian firearms.

==== Baikal IZH-79-8 ====
The Baikal IZH-79-8 is a modified version of the standard Makarov pistol, with an 8 mm barrel, modified to allow it to fire gas cartridges.

These guns proved popular after the fall of the USSR, and were used in Eastern Europe for personal protection.

However, unlike most gas firing guns, the body is made of standard Makarov-specification steel.

=== Production outside Russia ===
The Makarov pistol was manufactured in several communist countries during the Cold War and afterwards.

==== Bulgaria ====
Factory 10 (also known as Arsenal) produced the Makarov locally between 1975 and 2007.

Bulgarian Makarovs can be recognized by means of the digit "10" enclosed within a circle stamped into the left side of the frame, straight hammer serrations, slim star grip grip panels w/star and lanyard ring.

The Bulgarian-model Makarov pistol was approved for sale in the US state of California, having passed a state-mandated drop-safety test though the certification was not renewed and it has since been removed from the roster of approved handguns.

The Bulgarian Armed Forces will replace the local Makarov variant with the Springfield Armory Echelon in 9x19mm.

==== China ====
China adopted locally produced Makarovs as the Type 59 (Chinese: 59式) in 1959.

Type 59s come with minor cosmetic differences (i.e. the width of the slide's sight rail and configuration of the safety lever).

The military version was produced from 1959 to 1960 in Factory 626, and featured a characteristic shield embossed with 5 stars on the grip shell.

Civilian Type 59s were produced by Norinco for the export market.

===== Vietnam =====
The K59 is the Vietnamese copy of the Chinese Type 59 which is also known as SN9.

==== East Germany ====
GDR-era production Makarovs are known as "Pistole-M".

Pistole-Ms can be recognised through the plain dark grip shells, higher polish bluing, and early features (undrilled safety lever, round safety detent holes). Special training cutaways with serial number prefix "SM" were also produced.

==== North Korea ====
The Type 66 was a North Korean Makarov copy.

In Korean People's Army service, they were replaced by the Baek-Du-San pistol, a North Korean CZ-75 copy.

== Users ==
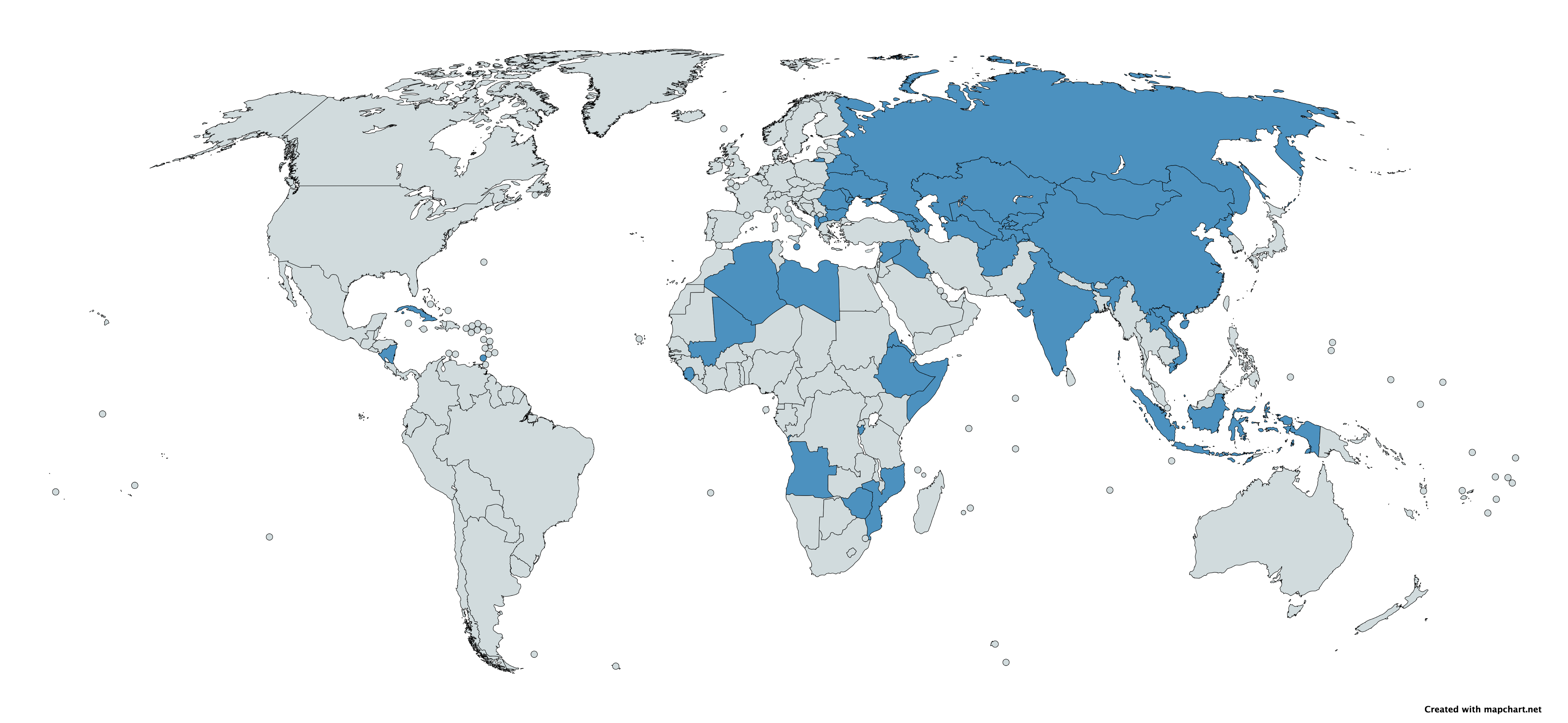
A map with Makarov Pistol users in blue

- Islamic Emirate of Afghanistan
- Albania
- Algeria
- Angola
- Armenia
- Azerbaijan
- Belarus
- Bulgaria
- China
- Cuba
- Eritrea
- Ethiopia
- Georgia
- Grenada
- Iraq
- Kazakhstan
- Kyrgyzstan
- Laos
- Libya
- North Macedonia
- Malta
- Moldova
- Mongolia
- Mozambique
- Nicaragua
- Russia
- Sierra Leone
- Somalia
- Syria
- Tajikistan
- Turkmenistan
- Ukraine
- Uzbekistan
- Vietnam
- Zimbabwe

=== Former users ===
- Chechen Republic of Ichkeria
- India: Indian Air Force
- Indonesia: Indonesian Air Force
- North Korea
- Romania
- Soviet Union

=== Non-state users ===
- Burundi: Burundian rebels
- People's Movement for the Liberation of Azawad
- Donetsk People's Republic
- Luhansk People's Republic
- Islamic State

== Surplus ==
In the United States, PMs from Soviet and East German military surplus are listed as eligible curio and relic items by the Bureau of Alcohol, Tobacco, Firearms and Explosives, because the countries of manufacture no longer exist.

== See also ==
- MP-448 Skyph
- Stechkin automatic pistol
