= MP-448 Skyph =

- Type: Semi-automatic pistol
- Place of origin: Russia

Production history
- Designer: D. A. Bogdanov
- Designed: 1990s - 1998
- Manufacturer: Izhevsk Mechanical Plant

Specifications
- Mass: 650 g (1.43 lb) (МР-448, МР-448C); 590 g (21 oz) (Skyph-mini)
- Length: 162 mm (6.4 in)
- Barrel length: 94 mm (3.7 in)
- Width: 32 mm (1.3 in)
- Height: 132 mm (5.2 in) (МР-448, МР-448C); 107 mm (4.2 in) (Skyph-mini)
- Cartridge: 9×18mm Makarov.380 ACP
- Feed system: 12-round detachable box magazine (МР-448); 10-round detachable box magazine (МР-448C); 8-round detachable box magazine (МР-448С Skyph-mini)
- Sights: Fixed; front blade and rear notch

The MP-448 Skyph (MP-448 Скиф) is a Russian pistol.

== History ==
The MP-448 was developed during the late 1990s by engineer-constructor and weapon designer Dmitry Bogdanov. It was initially offered by Izhevsk Mechanical Plant (IzhMech) for export sales and for private security companies as an enhanced version of the famous Makarov PM pistol (which is also manufactured by IzhMech).

In November 2000 one MP-448 pistol and one MP-448C pistol were presented at "INTERPOLITEX-2000" Arms exhibition in Moscow, they were offered for export.

Since 2003 Russian military and law enforcement have switched to the more powerful 9×19mm Parabellum and as such are purchasing larger, more powerful and higher capacity pistols such as the MP-443 Grach (also manufactured by IzhMech).

== Design ==
The MP-448 is slightly smaller and 200 g lighter than the Makarov PM thanks to a polymer frame. Like the Makarov, it is chambered for the 9×18mm Makarov cartridge which is similar in performance to the .380 ACP, and uses a double-stacked 12-round magazine like the PMM variant. Because of the 9×18mm's lower pressure (20,000 psi vs the 9×19mm Luger's 35,000 psi), the MP-448 works by blowback operation.

There are no takers for this pistol because there are only marginal improvements in ergonomics and accuracy over the Makarov PM and the Skyph also costs more.

== Variants ==
- МР-448 Skyph (МР-448 Скиф) - model chambered for 9×18mm Makarov.
- МР-448S Skyph (МР-448С Скиф) - variant chambered for 9×17mm Short. It was designed as a sidearm for private security companies.
- МР-448S Skyph-mini (МР-448С Скиф-мини) - compact version chambered for 9×17mm Short

== Users ==
- Belarus - adopted as training pistol
- Kazakhstan - since 2003 used as service pistol in private security companies

== See also ==
- Makarov PM
- 9×18mm Makarov
- List of Russian weaponry
- Izhevsk Mechanical Plant

== Museum exhibits ==
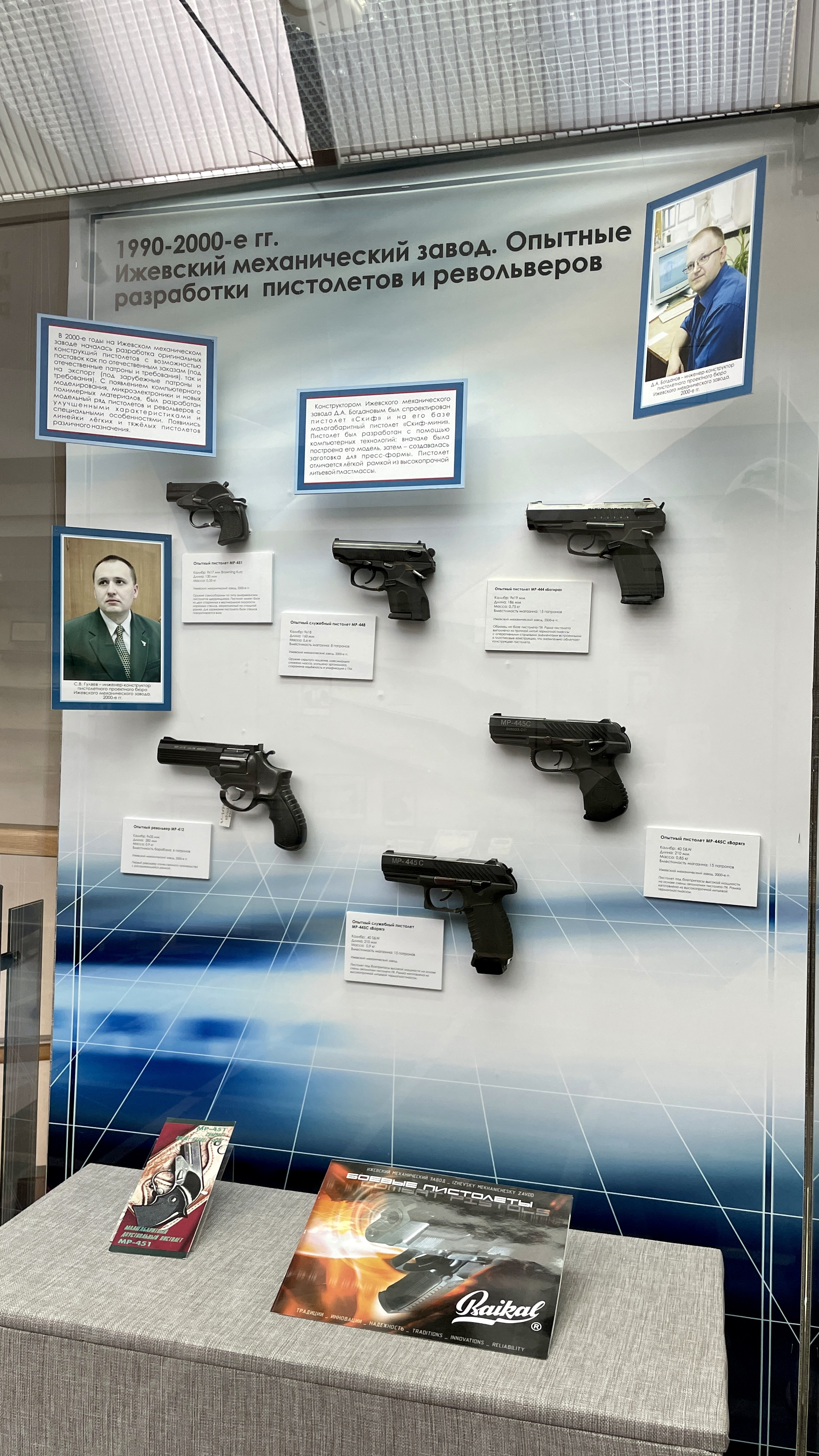
An MP-448 pistol in the collection of M. T. Kalashnikov Museum in Izhevsk

- An MP-448C pistol is in collection of M. T. Kalashnikov Museum in Izhevsk

== Sources ==
- Братья "Скифы" // журнал "Мастер-ружьё", № 63/64, июнь-июль 2002. стр.58-60
