= Škorpion =

Czechoslovak machine pistol

Škorpion vz. 61
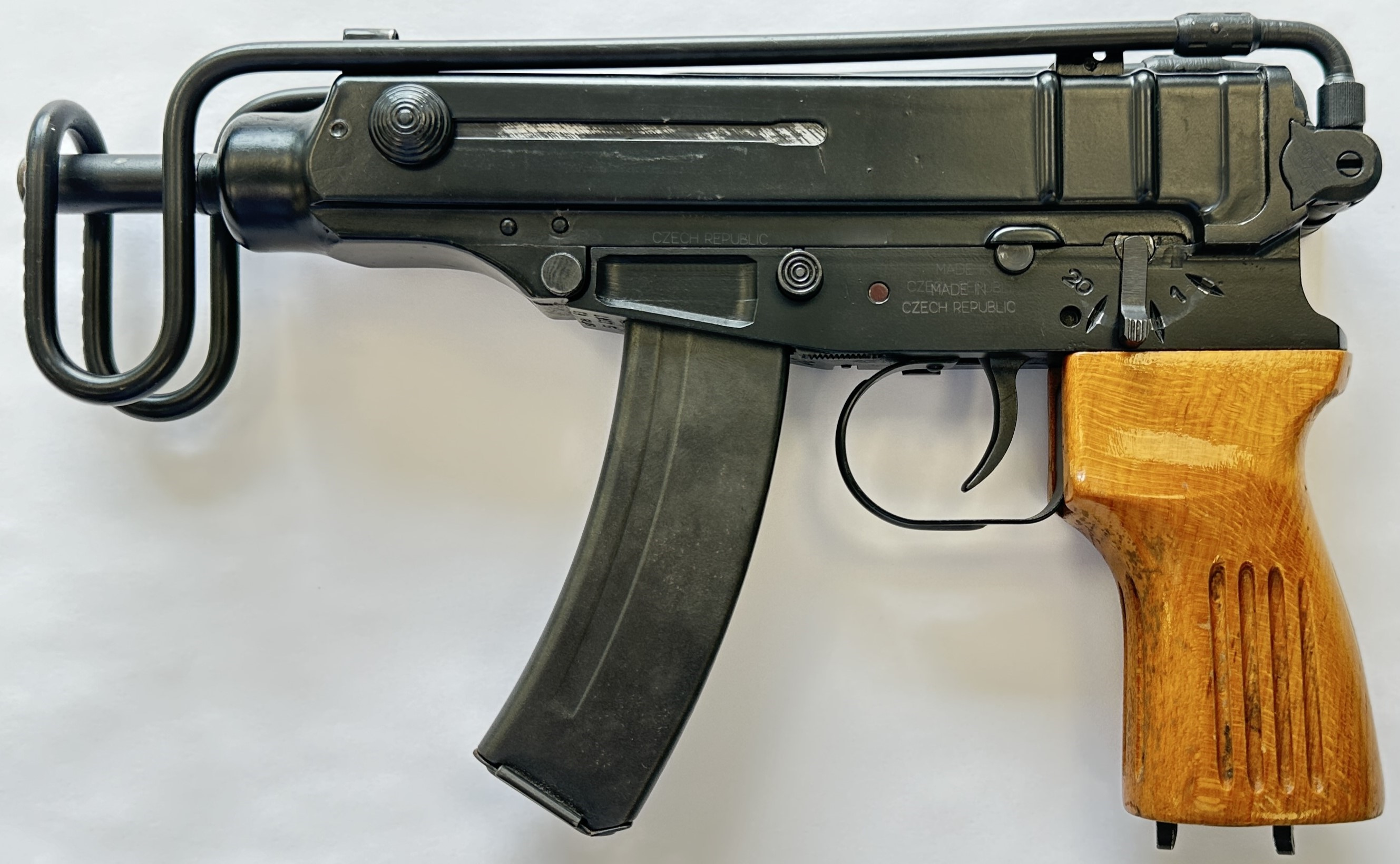
- Type: Machine pistol Submachine gun Semi-automatic pistol
- Place of origin: Czechoslovakia

Service history
- In service: 1961–present
- Used by: See Users
- Wars: Vietnam War; Lebanese Civil War; Rhodesian Bush War; The Troubles; Internal conflict in Peru; Yugoslav Wars; First Liberian Civil War; Russian invasion of Ukraine; Gaza war

Production history
- Designer: Miroslav Rybář
- Designed: 1959
- Manufacturer: Česká zbrojovka Uherský Brod, Zastava Arms, Czech Small Arms (CSA)
- Produced: 1961–1979 (original CZ production); 2009–present (CSA production)
- No. built: Approx. 200,000
- Variants: See Variants

Specifications
- Mass: 1.30 kg (2.87 lb)
- Length: 517 mm (20.4 in) stock extended / 270 mm (10.6 in) stock folded
- Barrel length: 115 mm (4.5 in)P
- Width: 43 mm (1.7 in)
- Cartridge: .32 ACP.380 ACP; 9×18mm Makarov.22 LR; 9mm P.A.K.
- Action: Blowback, closed bolt
- Rate of fire: 850 rounds/min
- Muzzle velocity: 320 m/s (1,050 ft/s)
- Effective firing range: 50–150 m (160–490 ft) (.32 ACP)
- Feed system: 10 or 20-round curved magazine, aftermarket 30-round magazine, straight box magazine in 9 mm variants
- Sights: Adjustable front post, flip-up rear sight 148 mm (5.8 in) sight radius

The Škorpion vz. 61 (or Sa vz. 61 Skorpion) is a Czechoslovak machine pistol developed in 1959 by Miroslav Rybář (1924–1970) and produced under the official designation Samopal vzor 61 ("submachine gun model 1961") by the Česká zbrojovka arms factory in Uherský Brod from 1963 to 1979. The standard version uses .32 ACP ammunition.

== History ==
The Škorpion was developed in the late 1950s by Miroslav Rybář with the working name "model 59". The design was completed in 1961 and named "Samopal Vz. 61".

The vz. 61 resumed production in 2009, being produced by the company Czech Small Arms.

== Design details ==
=== Operating mechanism ===
The Škorpion is a select-fire, straight blowback-operated weapon that fires from the closed bolt position. The .32 ACP cartridge used produces a very low recoil impulse and this enables simple unlocked blowback operation to be employed; there is no delay mechanism and the cartridge is supported only by the inertia of the bolt and the strength of the return springs.

When fired, gas pressure drives the case back in the chamber against the resistance provided by the weight of the bolt and its two recoil springs. The bolt travels back, extracting the empty case which is then ejected straight upwards through a port in the receiver housing top cover.

The Škorpion's compact dimensions were achieved by using a telescopic bolt assembly that wraps around a considerable portion of the barrel.

The weapon features a spring-loaded casing extractor, installed inside the bolt head and a fixed, double ejector, which is a protrusion in the weapon's frame.

As the bolt is relatively light, an inertial rate reducer device housed inside the wooden pistol grip lowers the weapon's rate of fire from 1,000 rounds/min to a more manageable 850 rounds/min.

The rate reducer operates as follows: when the bolt reaches the end of its rearward stroke it strikes and is caught by a spring-powered hook mounted on the back plate. At the same time it drives a lightweight, spring-loaded plunger down into the pistol grip.

The plunger is easily accelerated and passes through a heavy weight which is left behind because of its inertia. The plunger, having compressed its spring, is driven up again and then meets the descending inertia buffer.

This slows down the rising plunger which, when it reaches the top of its travel, rotates the hook, releasing the bolt which is driven forward by the compressed recoil springs.

The weapon is hammer-fired and has a trigger mechanism with a fire mode selector, whose lever (installed on the left side of the receiver, above the pistol grip) has three settings: "0", weapon is safe; "1", semi-automatic mode and "20", fully automatic fire. The "safe" setting disables the trigger and the bolt in the forward position (by sliding the bolt catch lever upwards).

=== Sights and Stock ===
The Škorpion is equipped with open-type iron sights (mechanically adjustable forward post and flip rear sight with 75 and 150 m range notches) and a folding metal wire shoulder stock. The stock can fold up and over the receiver (thus resembling the tail of a scorpion, hence the name) and is locked on the front sight's protection capture. This allows the weapon to be stored or stowed in a holster in a pistol-like manner. Firing operation is possible with the stock either folded (for faster deployment from the holster) or extended (enabling improved accuracy and controllability).

=== Ammunition ===
The Škorpion uses the 7.65×17mmSR Browning Short (.32 ACP) pistol cartridge, which was the standard service cartridge of the Czechoslovak security forces.

It uses two types of double-column curved box magazines: a short 10-round magazine (loaded weight, 0.15 kg) or a 20-round capacity magazine (loaded weight, 0.25 kg).

The bolt remains locked open after the last cartridge from the magazine has been fired and can be snapped back forward by pulling the cocking handle knob slightly to the rear.

=== Accessories ===
The Škorpion (with its stock folded), together with a short magazine, is carried like a traditional pistol: in a leather holster, and the two spare long magazines are carried in a separate pouch.

The weapon comes with a cleaning kit, front sight adjustment tool, oil bottle and lanyard. It can have a sound suppressor attached to the gun barrel.

== Variants ==
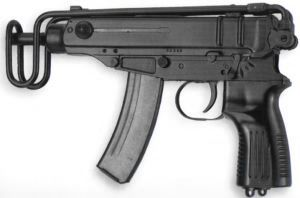
The Sa vz. 61 E with 20-round magazine

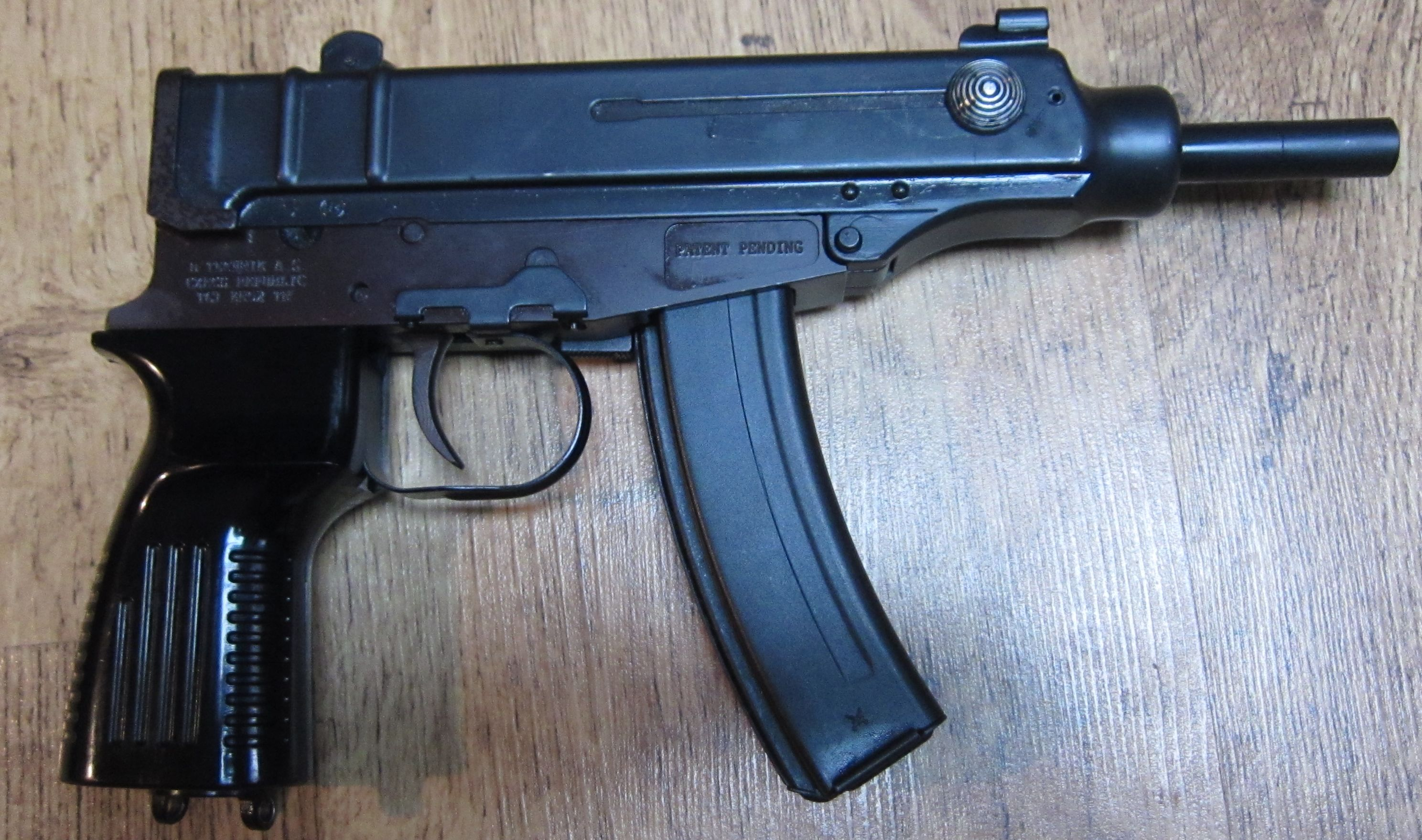
A civilian variant, semi-automatic only, with no stock.

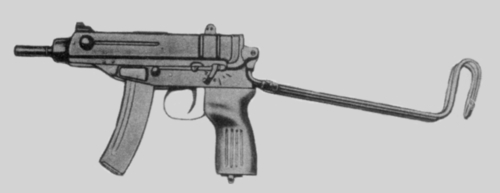
The Sa vz. 61 E with unfolded stock

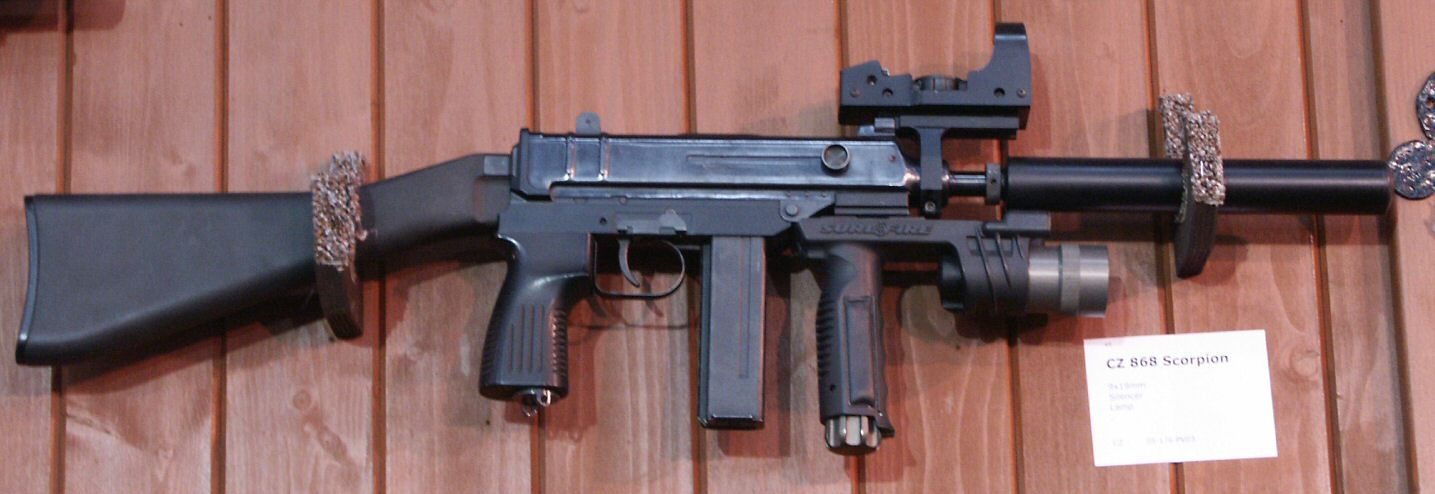
A carbine modification of the original Škorpion—the CZ 868.

Initially, there were three main export-only models based on the vz. 61 (the vz. 64, vz. 65, and vz. 68), differing only in small details. In early 1997, CZ began advertising new models including the vz. 83 and the CZ-91S.

=== Czechoslovakia/Czech Republic ===
- vz. 61 − Original model chambered in .32 ACP (7.65×17mmSR), it uses a 10 or 20-round magazine.
- vz. 64 − Export model chambered in .380 ACP (9×17mm Short), it accepts a 12, 24, or 30-round magazine.
- vz. 65 − Export model chambered in 9×18mm Makarov, magazine capacity includes 12, 24 & 30 rounds.
- vz. 68 − Export model chambered in 9×19mm Parabellum; it's slightly larger than the vz. 61, and uses straight box magazines.
- vz. 61E − Export model chambered in .32 ACP.
- vz. 82 − Chambered in 9×18mm Makarov and featuring a 113 mm (4.4 in) barrel; Uses straight box magazines.
- vz. 83 − Chambered in .380 ACP; Uses straight box magazines.
- CZ-91S − Semi-automatic only civilian model, available in the aforementioned calibers; it features a stainless steel receiver while the other external parts have a black enamel coating.
- CSA vz. 61 Pistol - Current production of the vz. 61 design by Czech Small Arms. The line features the standard .32 ACP variant with a wooden pistol grip, as well as variants chambered .380 ACP, 9x18mm Makarov, .22 long rifle and also a blank-firing version chambered in 9mm P.A.K., all of which are produced with synthetic pistol grips. 9mm variants use striaght box magazines.

=== Yugoslavia ===
- Zastava M84 − A licensed variant of the Škorpion (Serbian: М84 "ШКОРПИОН"), it features a synthetic pistol grip in place of the wooden original.

== Adoption ==
The Škorpion was subsequently adopted by the Czechoslovak Army and security forces, and later exported to various countries.

Although it was developed for use by security forces, the weapon was also accepted into service with the Czechoslovak Army as a personal sidearm for lower-ranking army staff, vehicle drivers, armoured vehicle personnel and special forces.

Currently the weapon is in use with the armed forces of several countries as a sidearm.

=== Criminal use ===
The Škorpion was also used by armed groups, including the Irish Republican Army, Irish National Liberation Army and the Italian Red Brigades.

The Brigades used the Škorpion during the 1978 kidnapping of Aldo Moro, also using this weapon to kill Moro.

In the 1990s the Gang de Roubaix used the Škorpion in a series of attacks in France.

In 2017, the Swedish Police Authority estimated that about 50 formerly deactivated weapons from Slovakia were in circulation among criminals in Sweden.

In 2022, the Škorpion was used in a hostage taking in an Apple store in Amsterdam and in the Wallasey pub shooting.

== In popular culture ==
The machine pistol Sa vz. 61 Skorpion appeared in many Czech and foreign movies. Czech movies include: Who's That Soldier? (1987), Byl jednou jeden polda III (1999) and The Velvet Murderers (2005). Others include: Executive Decision (1996), Con Air (1997), Face/Off (1997), The Matrix (1999), Blade II (2002), Equilibrium (2002), xXx (2002), The Matrix Revolutions (2003), The Dark Knight (2008), Resident Evil: Retribution (2012) and Captain America: The Winter Soldier (2014). The Klobb gun from the 1997 video game GoldenEye 007 is based on the Škorpion. The gun also appears in various mobile gacha games, including Blue Archive as the signature weapon of Tsubaki Kasuga, and an anthropomorphized version in Girls' Frontline.

== Users ==
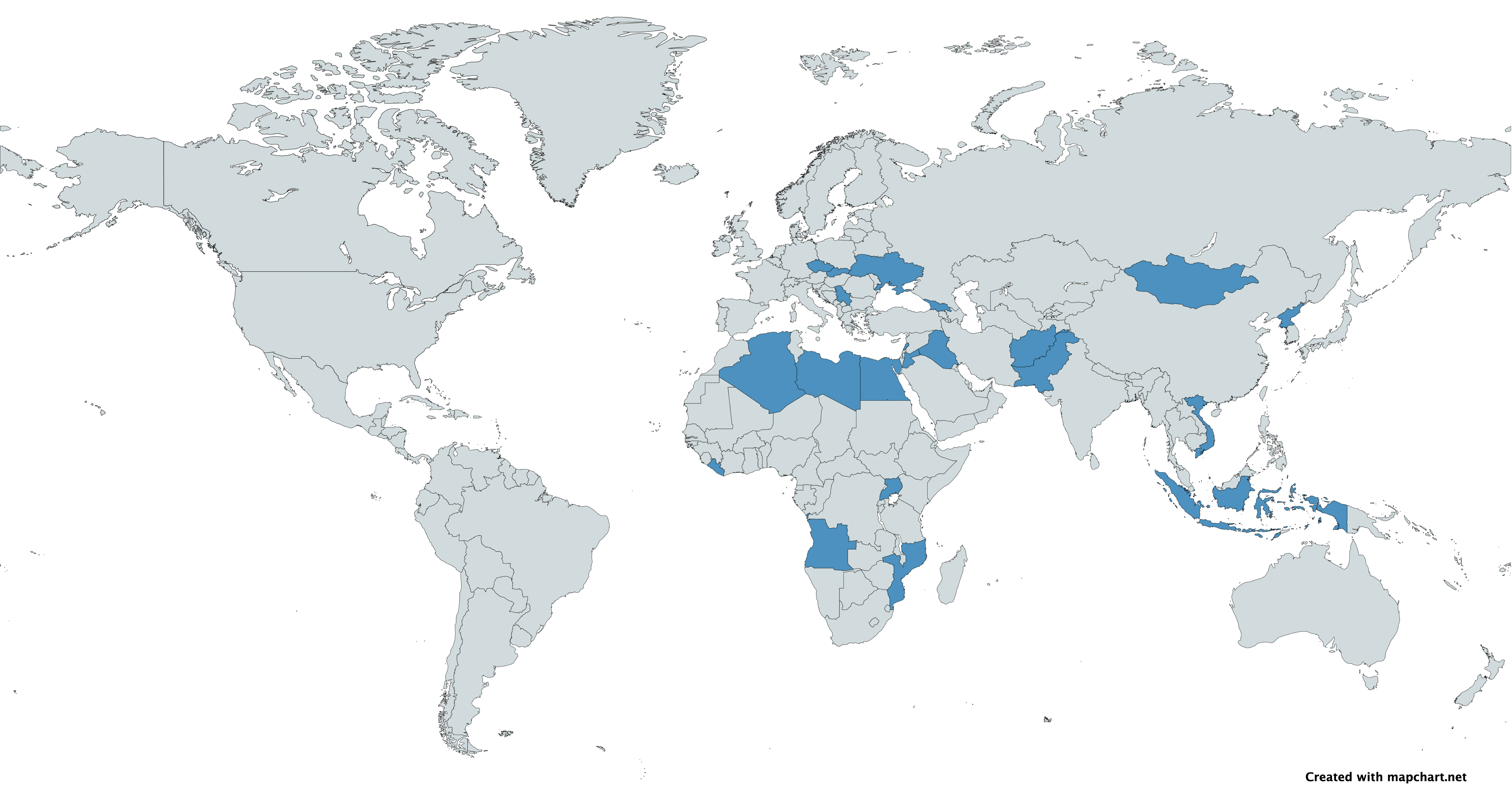
Map with Škorpion vz. 61 users in blue

=== Current users ===
- Afghanistan
- Angola
- Czech Republic
- Egypt
- Georgia
- Indonesia
- Iraq
- Jordan
- Lebanon
- Liberia: received Serbian M84s in 2002
- Libya
- Mozambique
- North Korea: Used by spies and special force units
- Pakistan Used by Dolphin police force
- Serbia
- Slovakia
- Uganda
- Ukraine 2,085 units supplied to Ukraine by the Czech Republic after the Russian invasion.

=== Former users ===
- Czechoslovakia
- East Germany: Used by the East German Nationale Volksarmee
- North Vietnam: Used by the North Vietnamese and the Viet Cong in the Vietnam War.
- Soviet Union: Used by Spetsnaz units
- Yugoslavia

Non-state users:

- Brigate Rosse
- Irish National Liberation Army (INLA)
- FMLN Škorpion vz. 61

== See also ==
- OTs-02 Kiparis
- PP-91 Kedr
- Intratec TEC-22
- MAC-10 and TEC-9, similar American machine pistols

== General sources ==
- Ezell, Edward Clinton (1993). Small Arms of the World: A Basic Manual of Small Arms (12th ed.). Harrisburg, Pennsylvania: Stackpole Books. ISBN 0-88029-601-1 – via Internet Archive.
- Gander, Terry J; Cutshaw, Charles Q, eds. (2003). Jane's Infantry Weapons, 2003−2004 (29th ed.). Coulsdon, Surrey: Jane's Information Group. ISBN 978-0-7106-2548-9.
- Škorpion: 7,65 mm samopal vz. 61 Škorpion a jeho varianty (in Czech). NV. 2004. ISBN 978-80-206-0704-1.
