= 9×18mm Makarov =

Soviet pistol and submachine gun cartridge

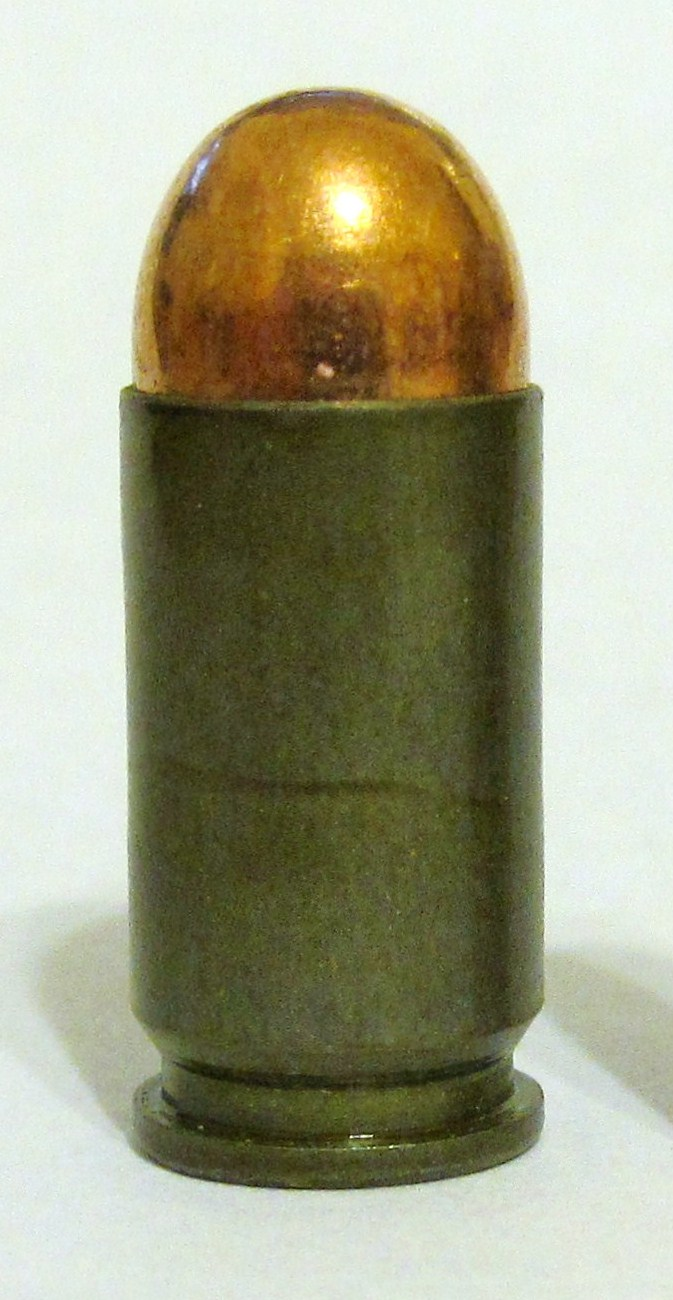
- 9×18mm Makarov cartridge (Full metal jacket bullet and steel case)
- Type: Pistol
- Place of origin: Soviet Union

Service history
- Used by: Russian Armed Forces; Polish Armed Forces; Armed Forces of Ukraine; Cuban Revolutionary Armed Forces; People's Army of Vietnam; Military of Bulgaria; People's Liberation Army; Military of the Czech Republic; Military of Slovakia; Indian Airforce

Production history
- Designer: B.V. Semin
- Designed: 1946
- Produced: 1951–present

Specifications
- Case type: Rimless, tapered
- Bullet diameter: 9.27 mm (0.365 in)
- Land diameter: 9.00 mm (0.354 in)
- Neck diameter: 9.91 mm (0.390 in)
- Base diameter: 9.95 mm (0.392 in)
- Rim diameter: 9.95 mm (0.392 in)
- Rim thickness: 1.25 mm (0.049 in)
- Case length: 18.10 mm (0.713 in)
- Overall length: 25.00 mm (0.984 in)
- Case capacity: 0.83 cm^{3} (12.8 gr H_{2}O)
- Rifling twist: 240.00 (1 in 9.45 in)
- Primer type: Berdan or Boxer small pistol
- Maximum pressure: 166.16365 MPa (24,100.000 psi)

Ballistic performance
Bullet mass/type	Velocity	Energy
95 gr (6 g) FMJ	319 m/s (1,050 ft/s)	305 J (225 ft⋅lbf)
95 gr (6 g) FTX	305 m/s (1,000 ft/s)	279 J (206 ft⋅lbf)
95 gr (6 g) Buffalo JHP +P	351 m/s (1,150 ft/s)	369 J (272 ft⋅lbf)
115 gr (7 g) Buffalo HC-FN +P	309.1 m/s (1,014 ft/s)	334 J (246 ft⋅lbf)
45 gr (3 g) RBCD TFSP	564 m/s (1,850 ft/s)	477 J (352 ft⋅lbf)
- Test barrel length: 97 mm Sources: C.I.P.; Buffalo Bore Ammunition; RBCD Performance Plus Ammunition

The 9×18mm Makarov (designated 9mm Makarov by the C.I.P. and often called 9×18mm PM) is a Soviet pistol and submachine gun cartridge. During the latter half of the 20th century, it was a standard military pistol cartridge of the Soviet Union and the Eastern Bloc, analogous to the 9×19mm Parabellum in NATO and Western Bloc military use.

== History ==
During the Second World War and the early Cold War, the 7.62×25mm Tokarev was the standard automatic pistol round for the Soviet Union and its satellites in Eastern Europe. This ammunition is still in use by many of these countries today. During the war, the Red Army had found a few shortcomings in its 7.62 mm TT-33 pistol, one of which was a tendency to inadvertently drop its magazine while in operation. The army wanted something that was lighter, with a heel release instead of a button and different ammunition. A direct blowback design was chosen for the pistol's operation, since it would be quick and cheap to manufacture, as well as accurate, due to the fixed-barrel design allowed by direct blowback operation.

The 9×18mm round was designed by Boris V. Semin in 1946, and was intended to be a relatively powerful round with modest bolt thrust that could function safely in a simple or direct blowback pistol. It was based on the 9×18mm Ultra cartridge which was developed in 1936 by Gustav Genschow & Co. for the German Luftwaffe, as a more powerful alternative to the 9×17mm used in the Walther PP, also a simple blowback design pistol. Nikolay Fyodorovich Makarov went on to design the Makarov PM pistol around the 9×18mm round in 1947. In 1951 both the Makarov pistol and the round were accepted by the Soviet Army, hence the round became commonly known thereafter as the Makarov as well.

Calibers in the USSR were measured between the lands in the rifling and not the grooves. As such, 9×18mm Makarov ammunition uses a larger diameter bullet than other common 9 mm rounds, measuring 9.27 mm (0.365 in), compared with 9.017 mm (0.355 in) for 9×19mm Parabellum. After its introduction in 1951, the 9×18mm Makarov round spread throughout the militaries of Eastern Bloc nations.

== Cartridge dimensions ==
The 9×18mm Makarov has 0.83 ml (12.8 grains H_{2}O) cartridge case capacity.

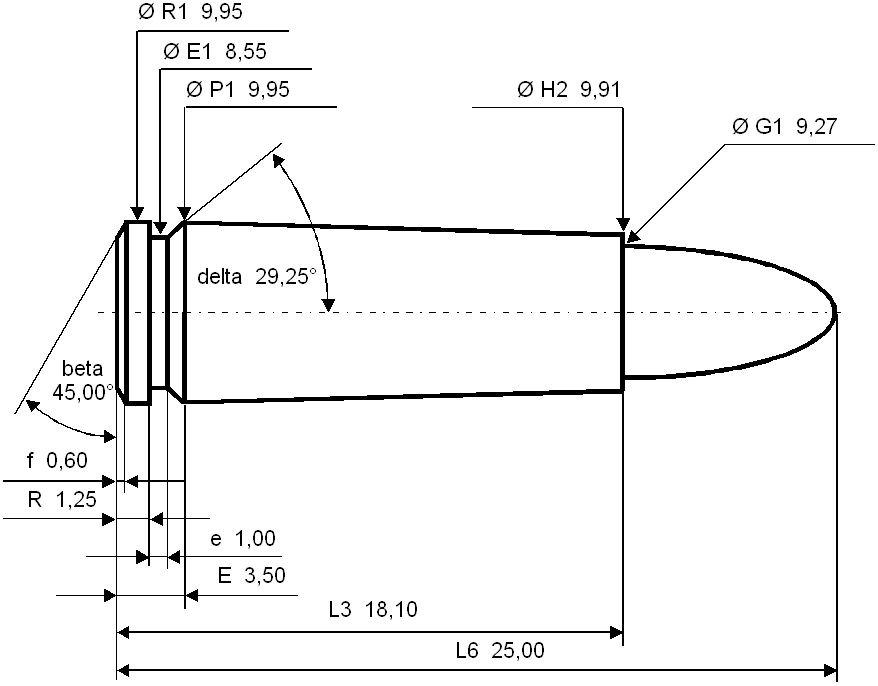

9×18mm Makarov maximum C.I.P. cartridge dimensions. All sizes in millimeters (mm).

The common rifling twist rate for this cartridge is 1 in 240 mm (9.45 in), 4 grooves, ø lands = 9.00 mm, ø grooves = 9.27 mm, land width = 4.50 mm and the primer type is small pistol.

According to the official C.I.P. (Commission Internationale Permanente Pour L'Epreuve Des Armes à Feu Portatives) rulings the 9×18mm Makarov case can handle up to 160.00 MPa (23,206 psi) piezo pressure. In C.I.P. regulated countries every pistol cartridge combo must be proofed at 130% of this maximum C.I.P. pressure to certify for sale to consumers.

The 9×18mm Makarov is ballistically inferior to the 9×19mm Parabellum cartridge. While there are no official SAAMI pressure specifications for the 9×18mm Makarov cartridge, tests indicate that surplus ammunition develop pressures in the lower 20,000 psi range, which is significantly less than the 35,000 psi or more generated by 9×19mm Parabellum (+P) loads. As such it is designed to be used in low-powered blowback semiautomatics, much like the .380 ACP cartridge, rather than locked-breech designs encountered, but not always required, for higher pressure cartridges like the 9×19mm Parabellum.

=== Basic specifications of 21st century Russian service loads ===
The 9×18mm Makarov rounds in use with the Armed Forces of the Russian Federation are designed for pistols and submachine guns. In 2003, there were several variants of 9×18mm Makarov produced for various purposes. All used clad metal as case material.

The 57-N-181S cartridge is loaded with a steel-core bullet and is designed to kill personnel at a range of up to 50 m (55 yd). The bullet has a clad metal envelope totally covering the core. The bullet's nose is spherical with no distinguishing colour of the tip. It can penetrate a 1.3 mm thick St3 steel plate or a 5 mm ordinary steel plate at 20 m (22 yd).

The RG028 cartridge is loaded with an enhanced penetration bullet and is designed to kill personnel wearing body armour. The bullet has a core of hardened steel.

The SP-7 cartridge is loaded with an enhanced stopping effect half plastic and half lead core jacketed hollow point bullet and is designed to defeat live targets. The bullet has a black tip.

The SP-8 cartridge is loaded with a lightweight half plastic and half lead core low-penetration jacketed hollow point bullet and is designed to engage personnel.

The 7N25 is a high-velocity cartridge loaded with a steel core bullet. It can penetrate a 5 mm thick St3 steel plate at 10 m (11 yd).

Cartridge designation	57-N-181S	RG028	SP-7	SP-8	7N25
Cartridge weight	10 g (154 gr)	11 g (170 gr)	8 g (123 gr)	8.5 g (131 gr)	7.5 g (116 gr)
Bullet weight	6 g (92.6 gr)	6 g (92.6 gr)	6 g (92.6 gr)	5 g (77.2 gr)	3.6 g (55.6 gr)
Muzzle velocity	298 m/s (978 ft/s)	325 m/s (1,066 ft/s)	420 m/s (1,378 ft/s)	250 m/s (820 ft/s)	490 m/s (1,608 ft/s)
Muzzle energy	251 J (185 ft⋅lbf)	317 J (234 ft⋅lbf)	417 J (308 ft⋅lbf)	156 J (115 ft⋅lbf)	432 J (319 ft⋅lbf)
Accuracy of fire at 25 m (27 yd) (R_{50})	32 mm (1.3 in)	32 mm (1.3 in)		32 mm (1.3 in)	

- R_{50} at 25 m (27 yd) means the closest 50 percent of the shot group will all be within a circle of the mentioned diameter at 25 m (27 yd).

== Firearms chambered for 9×18mm Makarov ==
=== Pistols ===
- Makarov PM
- MP-448 Skyph
- ČZ vz. 82
- FEG PA-63, SMC-918, R-61, RK-59
- P-83 Wanad
- P-64 pistol
- R-92
- OTs-01 Stechkin (RSA)
- OTs-27
- Fort 12
- Grand Power P9M
- ZVI KEVIN M

=== Submachine guns and machine pistols ===
- Stechkin APS
- Škorpion vz. 65 and vz. 82
- PM-63 RAK
- PM-84 Glauberyt
- PP-90 Penal
- PP-91 KEDR
- PP-93
- OTs-02 Kiparis
- OTs-33 Pernach
- PP-19 Bizon
- Arsenal Shipka
- Borz, used by Chechen Republic of Ichkeria during the First Chechen War

== Gallery ==
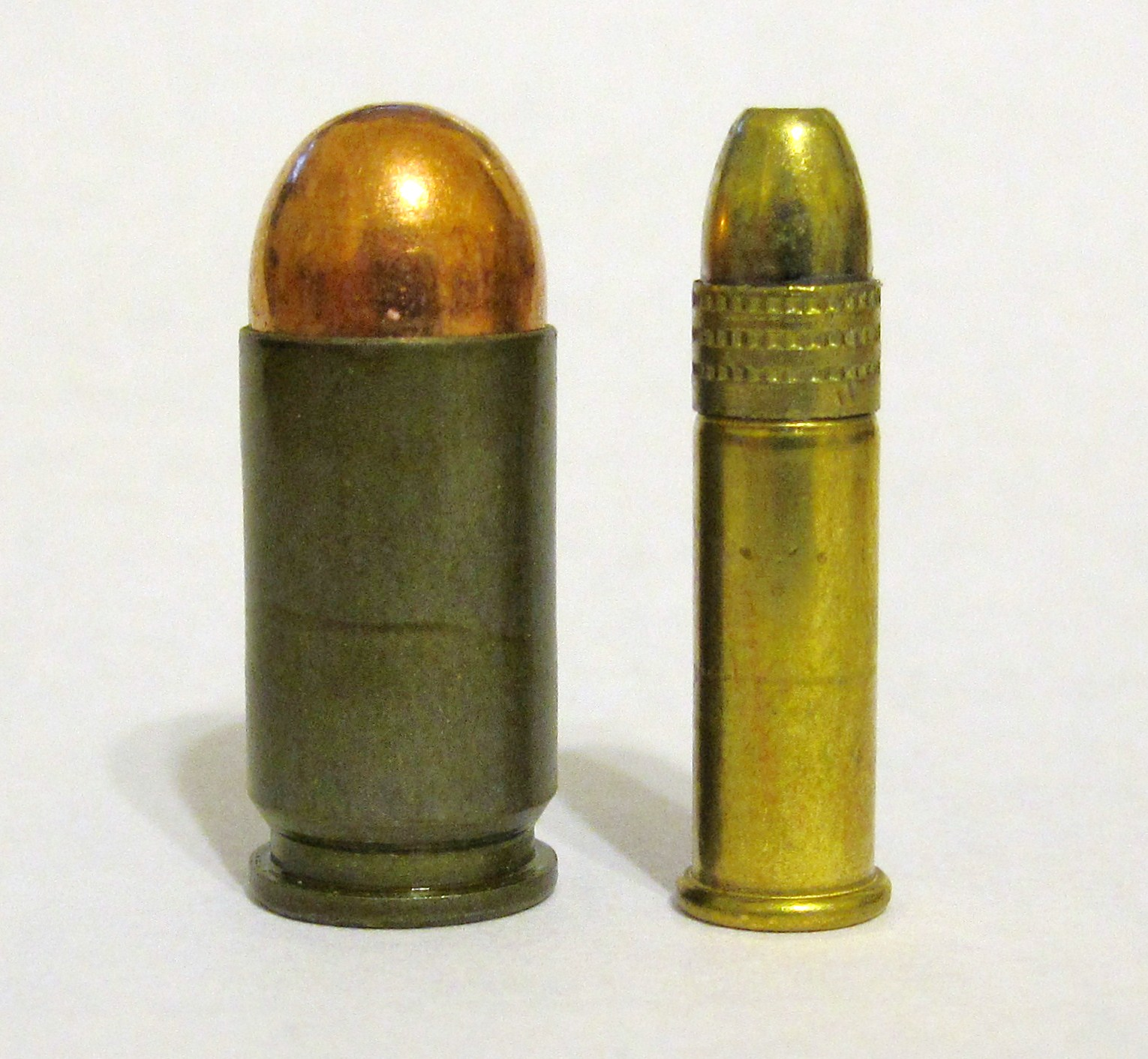
9×18mm Makarov compared to a .22LR hollow point

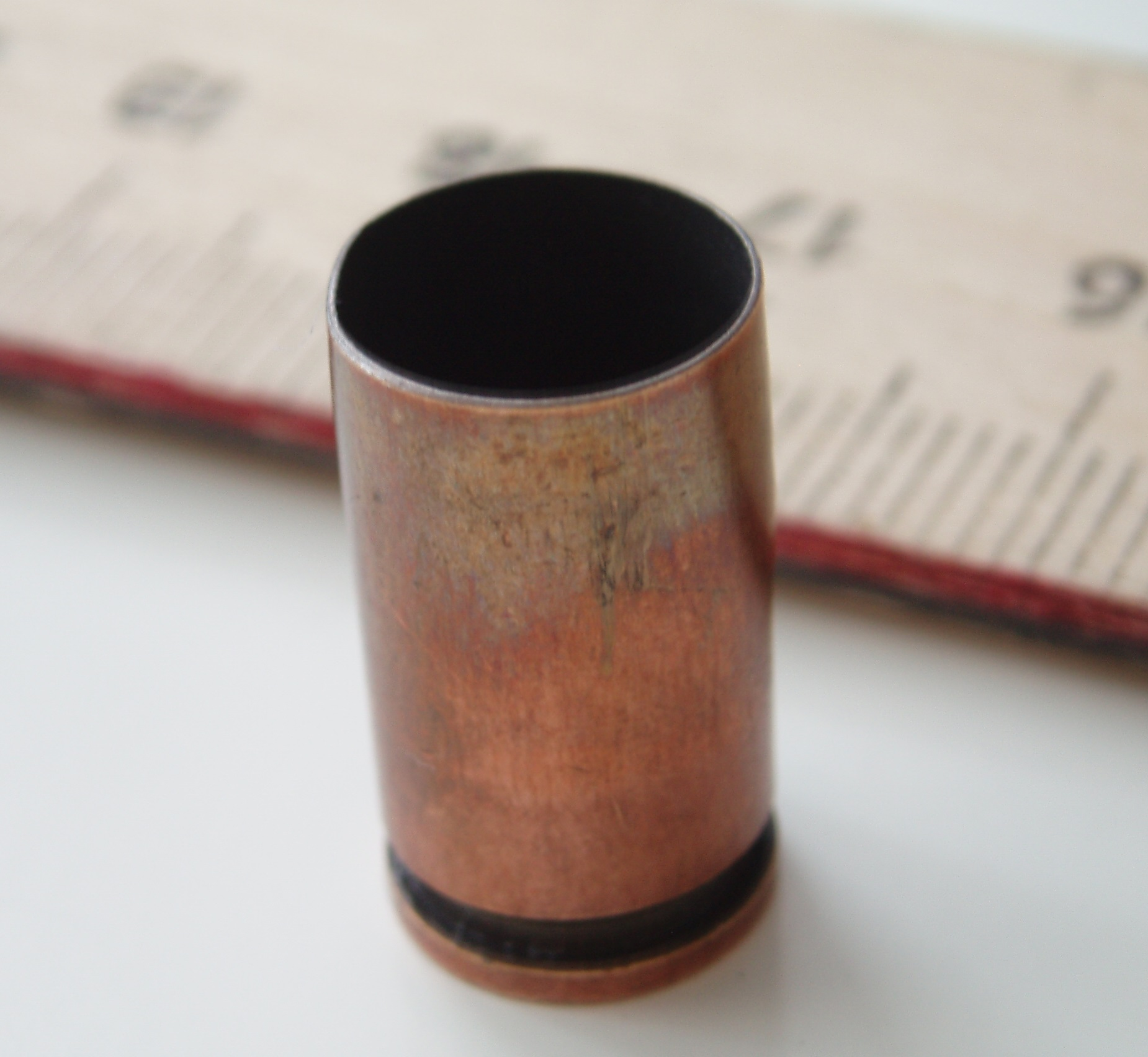
9×18mm Makarov case

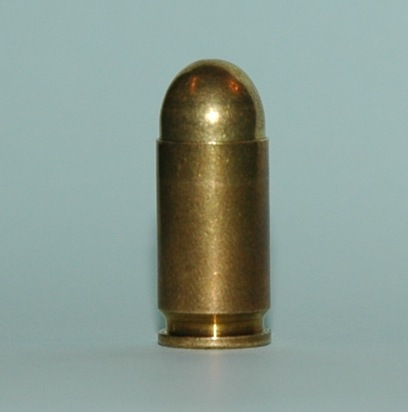
9×18mm Makarov

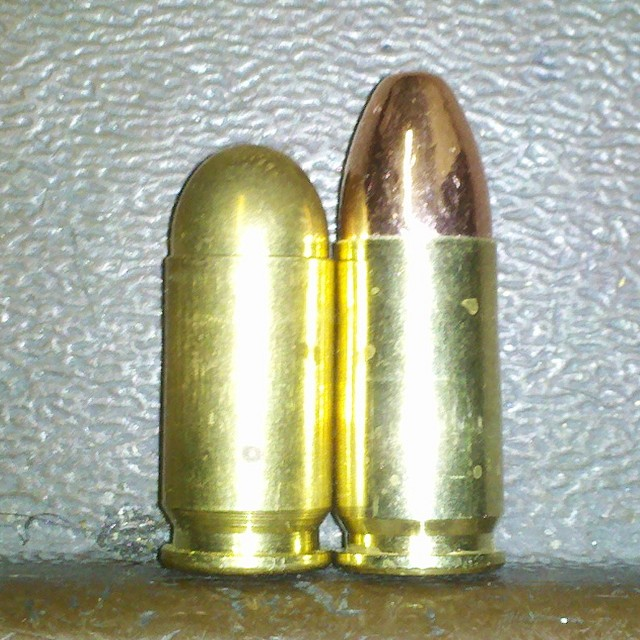
9×18mm Makarov compared to a 9×19mm Parabellum full metal jacket

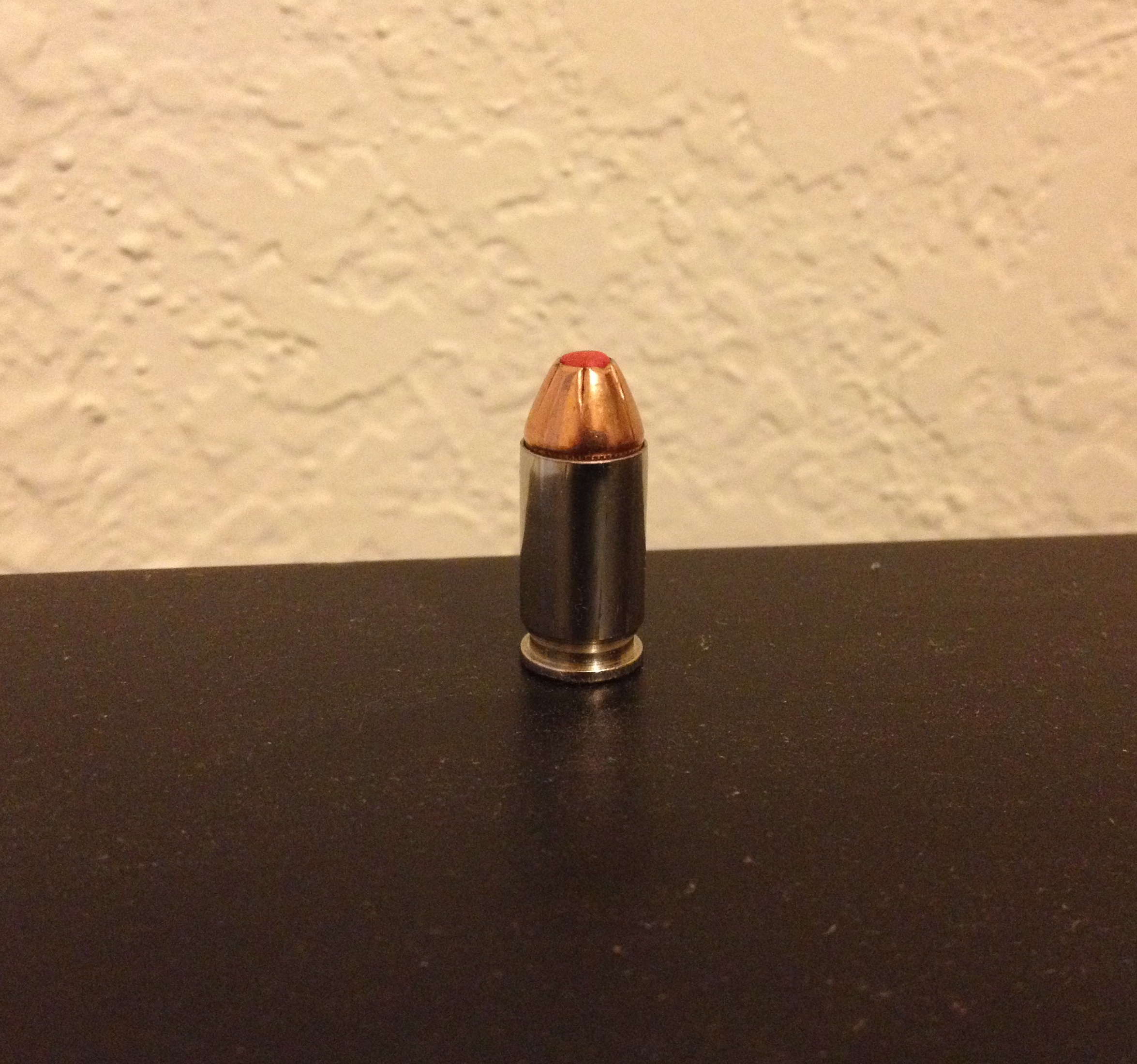
9×18mm Makarov FTX hollow point

== Synonyms ==
- 9mm Makarov
- 9×18mm
- 9×18mm PM
- 9mm Mak
- 9×18mm Soviet

== See also ==
- 9 mm caliber
- 9×39mm
- Barnaul Ammunition
- List of handgun cartridges
- Red Army Standard Ammunition
- Wolf Ammunition
