= AKS-74U =

Soviet carbine

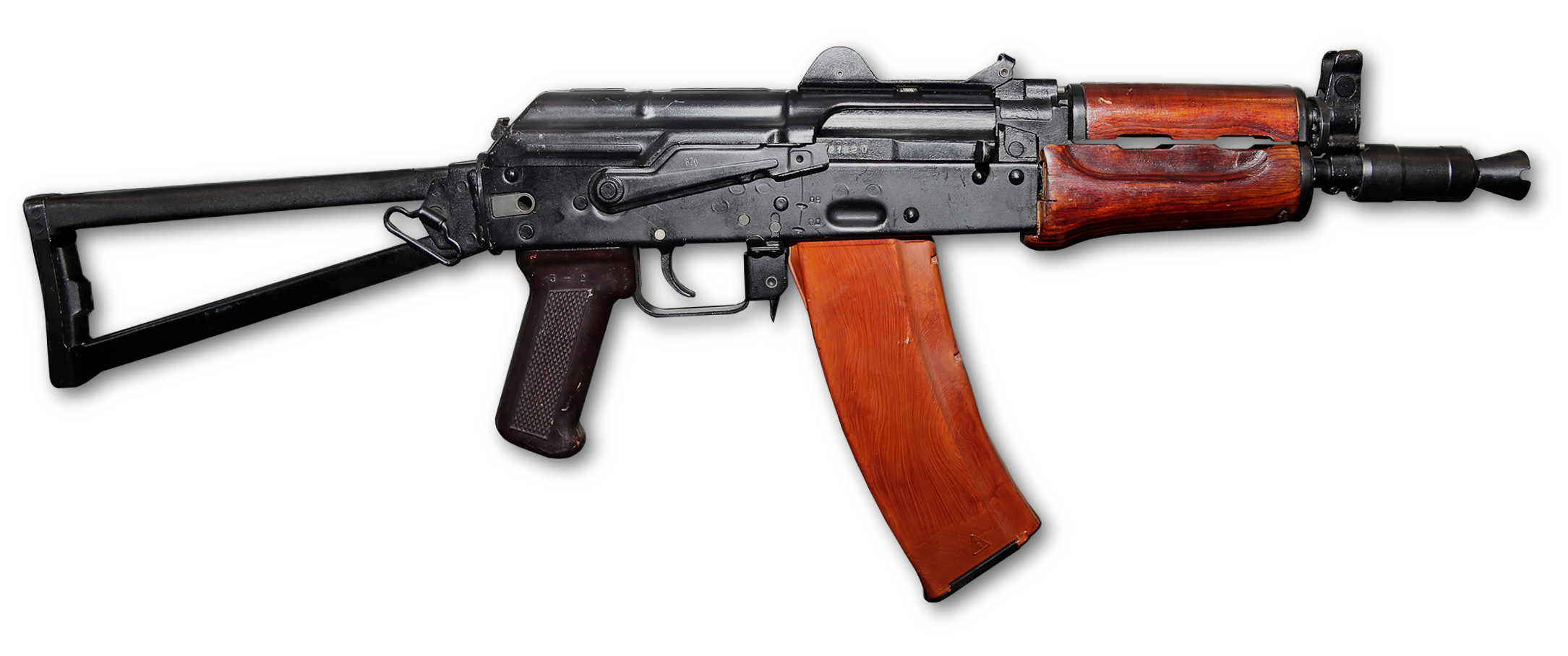
- AKS-74U with laminated wood furniture
- Type: Carbine; Assault rifle Personal defence weapon
- Place of origin: Soviet Union

Service history
- In service: 1979–present
- Wars: Soviet–Afghan War; Afghan Civil War (1989-1992); Transnistria War; Afghan Civil War (1992-1996); Tajikistan Civil War; First Chechen War; Second Chechen War; War in Afghanistan (2001–2021); Russo-Georgian War; War in Iraq (2013–2017); Syrian Civil War; War in Donbas; Russo-Ukrainian war (2022–present)

Production history
- Designer: Mikhail Kalashnikov
- Designed: 1970s
- Manufacturer: Tula Arms Plant
- Developed from: AK-74

Specifications
- Mass: 2.7 kg (6.0 lb)
- Length: 730 mm (28.7 in) (stock extended); 490 mm (19.3 in) (stock folded)
- Barrel length: 206.5 mm (8.1 in)
- Cartridge: 5.45×39mm
- Action: Gas-operated, long-stroke piston, closed rotating bolt
- Rate of fire: Cyclic: 700 rounds/min; Practical: 100 rounds/min
- Muzzle velocity: 735 m/s (2,411 ft/s)
- Effective firing range: 300–400 m (330–440 yd)
- Feed system: 20-, 30-round AK-74, 45-round RPK-74 detachable box magazine or 60-round casket magazine
- Sights: Adjustable iron sights, front post and U-shaped flip rear notch

The AKS-74U (Russian: Автомат Калашникова складной 1974 года укороченный, romanized: Avtomat Kalashnikova skladnoy 1974 goda ukorochenny, lit. 'Kalashnikov assault rifle folding 1974 shortened') is the compact carbine variant of the Soviet AK-74 rifle. The carbine fulfills the same role as similarly sized submachine guns.

== History ==
In 1973, a design competition (codenamed "Modern"; Russian: Модерн) was started for the adoption of a fully automatic carbine.

Soviet planners drew from the unsolicited design AO-46 built in 1969 by Peter Andreevich Tkachev, which weighed only 1.9 kg.

The TTT specifications required a weight no greater than 2.2 kg (4.9 lb), a length of 75 cm (29.5 in)/45 cm (17.7 in) with the stock unfolded/folded, and an effective firing range of 500 m (547 yd).

The competition was joined by designs of Mikhail Kalashnikov (PP1), Igor Stechkin (TKB-0116), S. G. Simonov (AG-043), A. S. Konstantinov (AEK-958), and Yevgeny Dragunov (who called his model "MA"). Kalashnikov also presented an additional design (A1-75) which differed from PP1 by having a modified muzzle for flash and noise suppression.

In 1977, the GRAU decided to adopt Kalashnikov's model, which was largely a shortened AKS-74, because its performance was no worse than the competition, and promised significant production cost savings by utilizing existing equipment for the AK-74 line.

A final round of large scale testing with Kalashnikov's model was performed by airborne divisions in the Transcaucasian Military District in March 1977.

The AKS-74U ("U"—Russian: укороченный; Ukorochenniy, or "shortened") was officially adopted in 1979, and given the official, but seldom used GRAU designation 6P26. Production stopped in 1993.

The majority of AKS-74U carbines were manufactured at the Tula Arms Factory rather than Izhmash.

== Design ==
The AKS-74U's compact dimensions were achieved by using a short 206.5 mm (8.1 in) barrel (this forced designers to simultaneously reduce the gas piston operating rod to an appropriate length).

The AKS-74U is approximately 3 oz (85 g) lighter than its NATO equivalent, the XM177, and 10.2 in (260 mm) shorter with the stock folded.

=== Operation ===
Due to the shortening of the operating mechanism, the cyclic rate rose slightly to around 700 rounds per minute. In order to effectively stabilize projectiles, the barrel's twist rate was increased from 200 mm (1:7.87 in) (or 37 calibers rifling twist rate) to 160 mm (1:6.3 in) (or 29.6 calibers rifling twist rate) to adapt the AKS-74U for muzzle velocities of 720 m/s (2,362 ft/s) and higher.

A new gas block was installed at the muzzle end of the barrel with a muzzle booster, which features an internal expansion chamber inside the cylindrical section of the booster, while the conical end acts as a nozzle to increase net pressure inside the gas chamber by supplying an increased amount of propellant gases from the barrel. The chrome-lined muzzle booster also burns any remaining propellant, which would normally reduce muzzle blast.

However, due to the extremely short barrel and conical end of the booster, the muzzle blast is nevertheless extremely large and visible. The muzzle device locks into the gas block with a spring-loaded detent pin and features two parallel notches cut into the edge of the flash hider cone, used for unscrewing it using the cleaning rod. Unlike most Kalashnikov variants, there is no provision to store the cleaning rod under the barrel. The front sight was integrated into the gas block/forward sling loop.

=== Ergonomics ===
The sight height above the bore axis is approximately 3 mm (0.1 in) higher than the AK-74 due to the combined front sight/gas block, rear sight configuration.

The AKS-74U has a different rear sight composed of a U-shaped flip sight on the top cover instead of the standard sliding notch tangent rear sight. This rear sight has two settings: "П" (Russian: постоянная, lit. 'constant') corresponding to a 350 m (383 yd) "point-blank range" battle zero setting and "4-5" (used for firing at distances between 400–500 m (437–547 yd)).

The rear sight is housed in a semi-shrouded protective enclosure that is riveted to the receiver's spring-loaded top cover. This top cover hinges from a barrel trunnion (hinging where the rear sight on a normal AK74 is located), pivoting forward when opened, which also works to unlock the gas tube cover. Both the gas tube and handguard are also of a new type and are wider and shorter than the analogous parts in the AKS-74.

The AKS-74U was used as the basis for several other unique weapons, including the bullpup OTs-14 Groza specialist carbine which is now in limited service in the Russian military, and the Gepard series of multi-caliber submachine guns (none of which evolved past prototype stage).

=== Ammunition ===
For the AKS-74s combined with the 7N6 or 7N10 service cartridges the 350 m battle zero setting limits the apparent "bullet rise" within approximately −5 to +42 cm (−2.0 to 16.5 in) relative to the line of sight.

Soldiers are instructed to fire at any target within this range by simply placing the sights on the center of mass (the belt buckle) of the enemy target. Any errors in range estimation are tactically irrelevant, as a well-aimed shot will hit the torso of the enemy soldier.

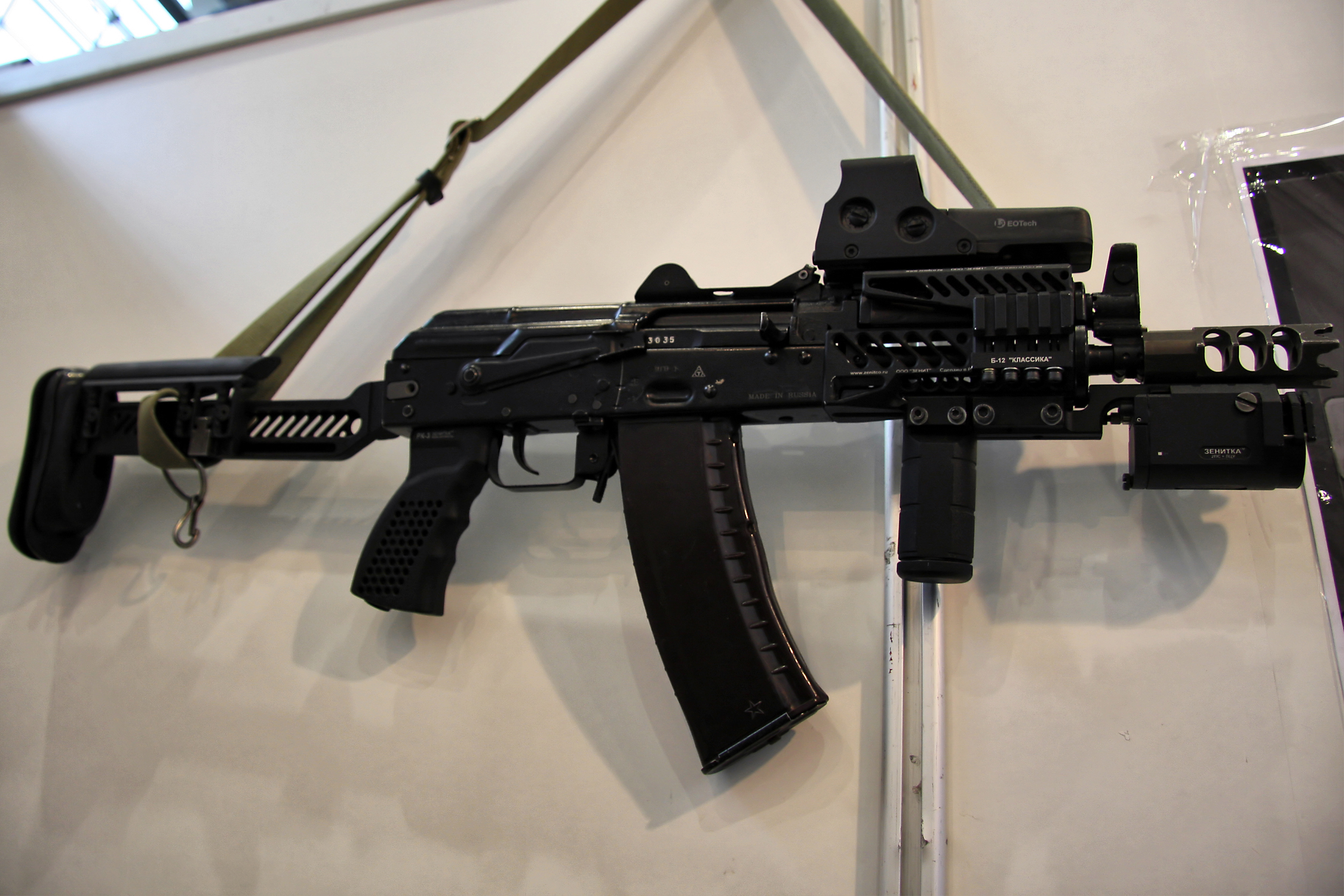
An AKS-74U with various Zenitco accessories installed

The AKS-74U is significantly more maneuverable in tight quarters than the AKS-74; however, the significant decline in muzzle velocity to 735 m/s (2,411 ft/s) resulted in a 100 m (109 yd) reduction in effective range to 400 m (437 yd) (the effective hitting distance for a "running"-type silhouette target was reduced from 625 m (684 yd) to 360 m (394 yd)).

=== Accessories ===
The AKS-74U cannot mount a bayonet or standard under-barrel grenade launcher. However, a suppressed 30 mm BS-1 grenade launcher was developed specifically for that platform that fires a high-explosive dual purpose (HEDP) grenade.

The grenades for the BS-1 are launched by special blank cartridges that are inserted into the grenade launcher via a detachable magazine.

There were some accessories produced for the AKS-74U including a plastic thigh holster and (shorter than standard) 20-round AK-74 type magazines. The rifle utilizes a proprietary 25 mm wide sling that differs from the standard 35 mm AK sling also in construction. The AKS-74U also exists in a version featuring modernized synthetic furniture made from a black, glass-filled polyamide.

== Variant ==
=== AKS-74UB ===
The AKS-74UB (Russian: Автомат Калашникова складной 1974 года укороченный бесшумный, romanized: Avtomat Kalashnikova skladnoj 1974 goda ukorochenny besshumniy, lit. 'Kalashnikov assault rifle model 1974 shortened silent') is a variant of the AKS-74U adapted for use with the PBS-4 suppressor and with subsonic 5.45×39mm YU1 ammunition.

== Adoption ==
The AKS-74U bridges the tactical deployment gap between a submachine gun and an assault rifle. It was intended for use mainly with special forces, airborne infantry, rear-echelon support units, helicopter and armored vehicle crews.

It has been augmented and replaced by various submachine guns, and the less compact AK-105 carbine in Russian military service. It is commonly used by law enforcement; for example, each urban police foot patrol is issued at least one.

== Cultural legacy ==
In the United States, the AKS-74U is sometimes called a "Krinkov". The origin of this term is uncertain. A hypothesis was circulating that the name came from the Mujahideen, who supposedly had captured a high-ranking Soviet officer armed with an AKS-74U, and that they had named it after him. However, investigation by Patrick Sweeney could not confirm this hypothesis, for no Soviet officer with a resembling name was captured in Afghanistan.

US journalist C. J. Chivers reported that the gun was nicknamed "the Osama" with jihadists, after Osama bin Laden was photographed next to an AKS-74U.

== Users ==
- Belarus
- Guatemala
- Israel: Used by Shayetet 13.
- Syria
- Russia: Being replaced by AM-17.
- Ukraine: Being replaced by Fort-230.

=== Former users ===
- USSR: Passed on to successor states.

== See also ==
- PP-19 Bizon
- PP-19-01 Vityaz

== Sources ==
- Cutshaw, Charlie (1998). The New World of Russian Small Arms & Ammo. Boulder, Colo.: Paladin Press. ISBN 978-0-87364-993-3.
- Monetchikov, Sergei (2005). История русского автомата [The History of Russian Assault Rifle] (in Russian). St. Petersburg: Military Historical Museum of Artillery, Engineers and Signal Corps. ISBN 978-5-98655-006-0.
