= Nikolay Makarov (firearms designer) =

Soviet firearms designer (1914–1988)

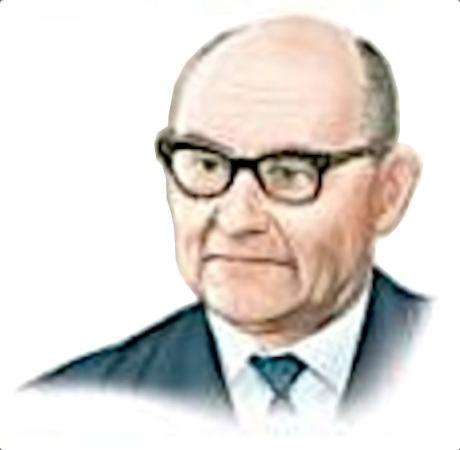
- Born: Nikolay Fyodorovich Makarov; 22 May 1914; Sasovo, Shatsky Uyezd, Tambov Governorate, Russian Empire
- Died: 13 May 1988 (aged 73); Tula, RSFSR, Soviet Union
- Education: Tula State University
- Known for: Makarov pistol

Nikolay Fyodorovich Makarov (Russian: Никола́й Фёдорович Мака́ров; 22 May [O.S. 9 May] 1914 – 13 May 1988) was a Soviet firearms designer, most notable for his Makarov pistol. He was given the title Hero of Socialist Labour in 1974.

== Biography ==
Makarov was born on 22 May 1914 in the village of Sasovo to the family of a railway worker. In 1936, he enrolled to the Tula Mechanical Institute. At the onset of the Axis invasion, he was preparing for his graduation. He was hastily qualified as an engineer and sent to the Zagorski Machine Works (now in Sergiyev Posad). The plant was soon evacuated to Kirov Oblast. In 1944, Makarov returned to Tula, and graduated from the Tula Mechanical Institute with honors. In 1945, he took part in a pistol design competition that aimed to find a replacement for the TT pistol and Nagant M1895 revolver (the former had been in use since 1930 and the latter since the late 1800s). Makarov's work, which made use of some elements of the Walther PP, won the competition and was adopted by the army in 1951. Makarov continued designing firearms in Tula until his retirement in 1974. Later, he was elected to the Soviet of Working People's Deputies in Tula Oblast, and was chosen as a council member of the scientific and technological society Mashprom.

He died on 13 May 1988 as a result of his seventh heart attack and was buried at the 1st Municipal Cemetery in Tula.

== Weapon designs ==
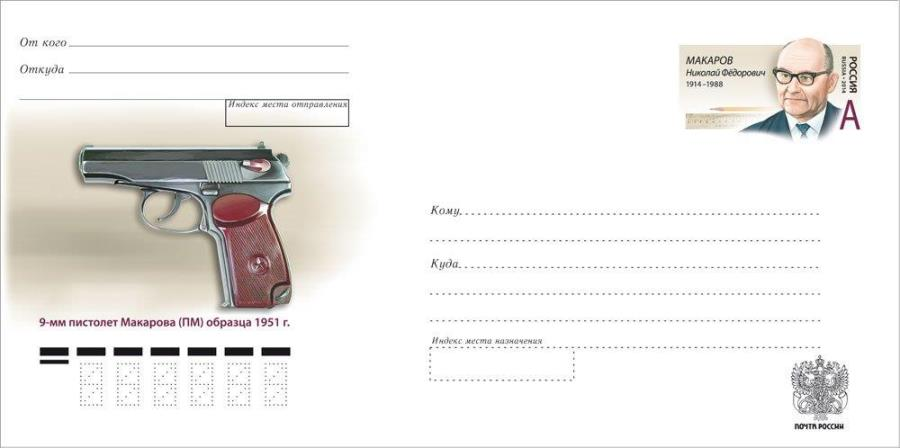
Makarov and his pistol on a 2014 Russian envelope

- Makarov pistol (added to Soviet Army armory in 1951)
- Afanasev Makarov AM-23 cannon together with Nikolai Afanasyev (added to armory in 1953)
- 9K111 Fagot (added to armory in 1970)
- 9M113 Konkurs (added to armory in 1974)

== Awards ==
- Stalin Prize (1952)
- USSR State Prize (1967)
- Order of the Red Banner of Labour (1966)
- Order of Lenin (1971, 1974)
- Hero of Socialist Labour (1974)
