= OTs-02 Kiparis =

OTS-02 Kiparis
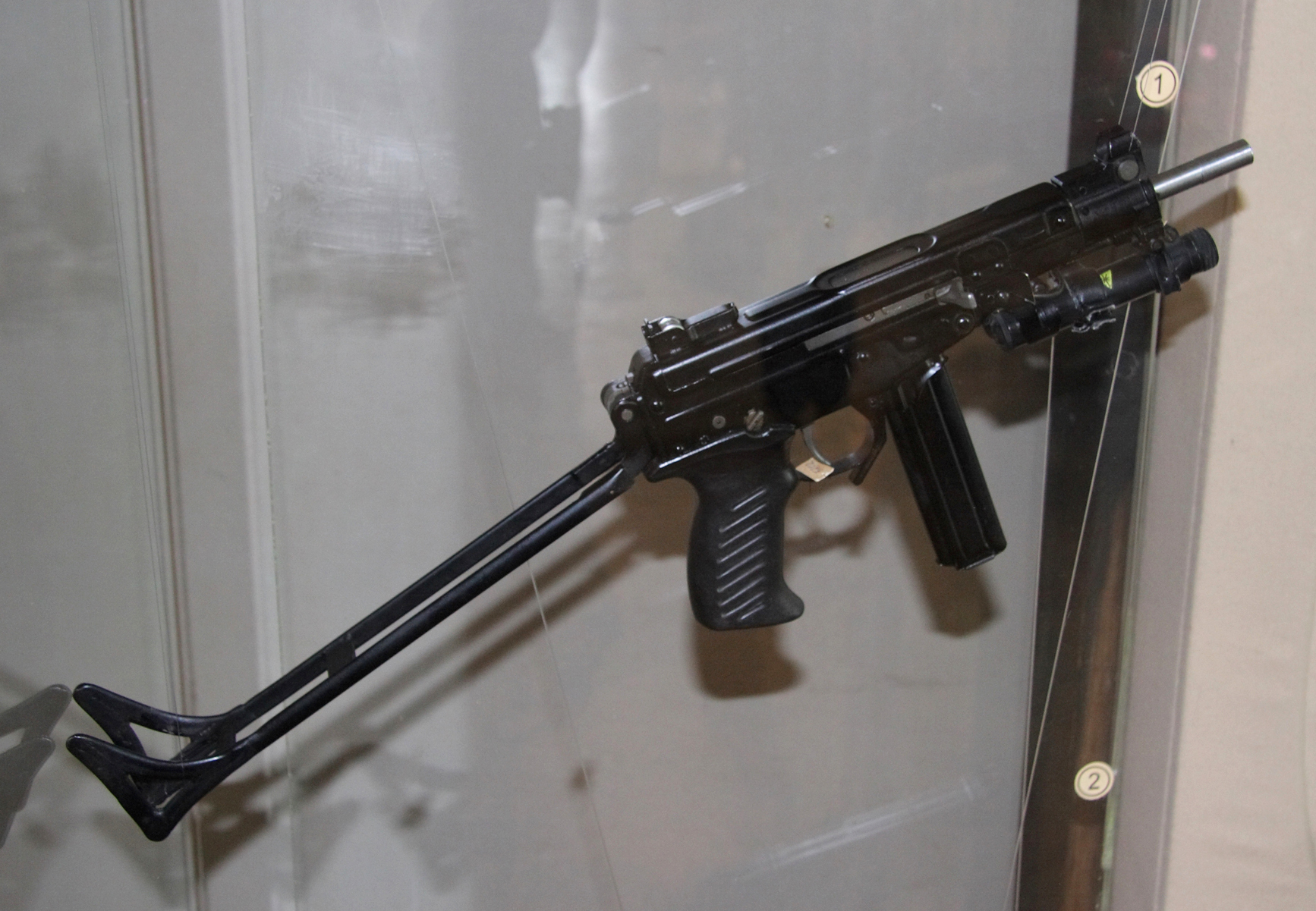
- Type: Submachine gun
- Place of origin: Soviet Union

Service history
- In service: 1991 – present
- Used by: MVD; FTS

Production history
- Designer: TsKIB SOO
- Designed: 1972
- Manufacturer: KBP Instrument Design Bureau
- Produced: 1991 – present
- Variants: See Variants

Specifications
- Mass: 1.6 kg (3.53 lb)
- Length: 590 mm (23.2 in) stock extended / 317 mm (12.5 in) stock folded
- Barrel length: 156 mm (6.1 in)
- Cartridge: 9×18mm Makarov
- Action: Blowback
- Rate of fire: 850 rounds/min
- Muzzle velocity: 340 m/s (1,115 ft/s)
- Effective firing range: 75 m
- Feed system: 10-, 20-, or 30-round detachable box magazine
- Sights: Iron sights

The OTS-02 Kiparis (ОЦ-02 Кипарис) Russian for "cypress") is a Soviet submachine gun first designed by the TsKIB SOO design bureau of Tula in the early 1970s, although it was not introduced into service until 1991. It is primarily intended for internal security and police units, it was adopted by the Russian police and Ministry of Internal Affairs.

== Design details ==
The OTS-02 is a blowback-operated weapon of a conventional design chambered in 9×18mm Makarov.

The receiver is made from pressed steel with a synthetic plastic pistol grip. It feeds from stamped steel detachable straight box magazines, inserted into a well in front of the trigger guard with either a 20 or 30-round cartridge capacity.

The weapon has a rudimentary steel skeletonized stock which folds up and over the receiver when folded, in such a manner that the simple base plate outline extends downwards to either side of the muzzle. The Kiparis is supplied with a proprietary sound suppressor with a service life of approximately 6,000 rounds, the same service life as the barrel.

The OTS-02 Kiparis can also accommodate a red dot sight or a tactical laser pointer which clips on forward of the magazine housing in such a way that the bottom of the laser aiming device can act as a forward grip during aiming.

== Variants ==
- TKB-0217 (ТКБ-0217) - first test prototype
- OTS-02 (ОЦ-02 "Кипарис") - standard serial SMG produced since 1991
- OTS-02-1 (ОЦ-02-1) - integrally-silenced variant, chambered in 9×18 mm PM
- GMC-700 - non-lethal gas pistol for private security agencies; only 30 made

== Users ==
- Lebanon: Lebanese Special Operations Command
- Russia: Ministry of Internal Affairs, Police of Russia, security guards of the Central Bank of The Russian Federation and Sberbank

== See also ==
- List of Russian weaponry
- MPA
- Škorpion
