= 9×21mm Gyurza =

Russian munition

9×21mm
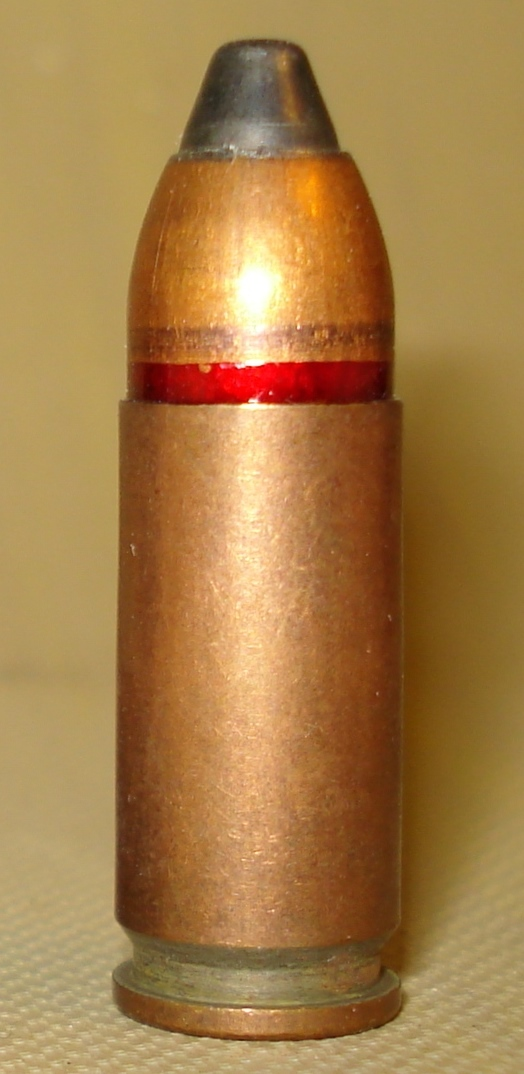
- 9x21 RG054 cartridge – the predecessor of SP10
- Type: Pistol
- Place of origin: Russia

Service history
- Used by: FSB; Russian Army

Production history
- Designer: TsNIITochMash
- Produced: 1990s–present
- Variants: SP-10 (7N29), SP-11 (7N28), SP-12, SP-13 (7BTZ)

Specifications
- Parent case: 9×21mm
- Case type: Straight, rimless
- Bullet diameter: 9.05 mm (0.356 in)
- Shoulder diameter: 9.6 mm (0.38 in)
- Base diameter: 9.9 mm (0.39 in)
- Rim diameter: 9.9 mm (0.39 in)
- Rim thickness: 1.2 mm (0.047 in)
- Case length: 20.9 mm (0.82 in)
- Overall length: 32.7 mm (1.29 in)

Ballistic performance
Bullet mass/type	Velocity	Energy
6.7 g (103 gr) 7N29	410 m/s (1,300 ft/s)	563 J (415 ft⋅lbf)
7.9 g (122 gr) 7N28	390 m/s (1,300 ft/s)	601 J (443 ft⋅lbf)
7.2 g (111 gr) 7BTZ	395 m/s (1,300 ft/s)	562 J (415 ft⋅lbf)

The 9×21mm Gyurza (Гюрза, Russian for "blunt-nosed viper") round is a Russian handgun round designed to defeat body armor that was developed by TsNIITochMash for its SR-1 Vektor semi-automatic pistol and SR-2 Veresk submachine gun.

== Performance ==
The method of construction of the rounds allows them to be effective against both unarmored and armored targets. The bullet has a hard sub-caliber core contained within an outer sleeve and separated from it by a polyethylene layer. If the bullet strikes an unarmored target, it holds together to produce a wide wound channel. If the bullet strikes an armored target, the sleeve is stripped away, and the core penetrates alone. The 7N29 AP loading fires a 6.7 g (103 gr) bullet at 410 m/s (1,300 ft/s) with 560 J (410 ft⋅lb) of muzzle energy and will reportedly penetrate two 1.2 mm titanium plates, plus 30 layers of Kevlar, at 50 m (160 ft). The disadvantage of the rounds is that high impact velocities are needed for them to work effectively, so the bullets are relatively light to maximize their muzzle velocity. This means they will lose velocity relatively quickly, limiting their effective range.

== Variants ==
SP-10-UCH – unloaded training cartridge

SP-10 (7N29, sometimes referred to as RG052 or RG054) – armor-piercing bullet with hardened steel core

SP-11 (7N28) – standard FMJ bullet with lead core

SP-12 – low ricocheting, expanding bullet

SP-13 (7BT3) – tracer AP bullet based on 7N29

SP-17 – bullet with reduced environment penetration

== Designations ==
- 9×21mm Gyurza
- 9mm Gyurza

== Platforms ==
- SR-1 Vektor
- SR-2 Udav
- SR-2 Veresk
- Gepard (submachine gun)

== See also ==
- 9x19mm 7H21, 9x19mm 7H31 — Armor-piercing variant of 9×19mm Parabellum
- 9×30mm Grom — Uses RG054 bullet
- 9x21mm - 9x21mm pistol cartridge distinct from 9x21mm Gyurza, as a result of different cartridge dimension measuring systems. Sometimes referred to as 9x21mm IMI, GP, or Winchester
