= Arms industry in Romania =

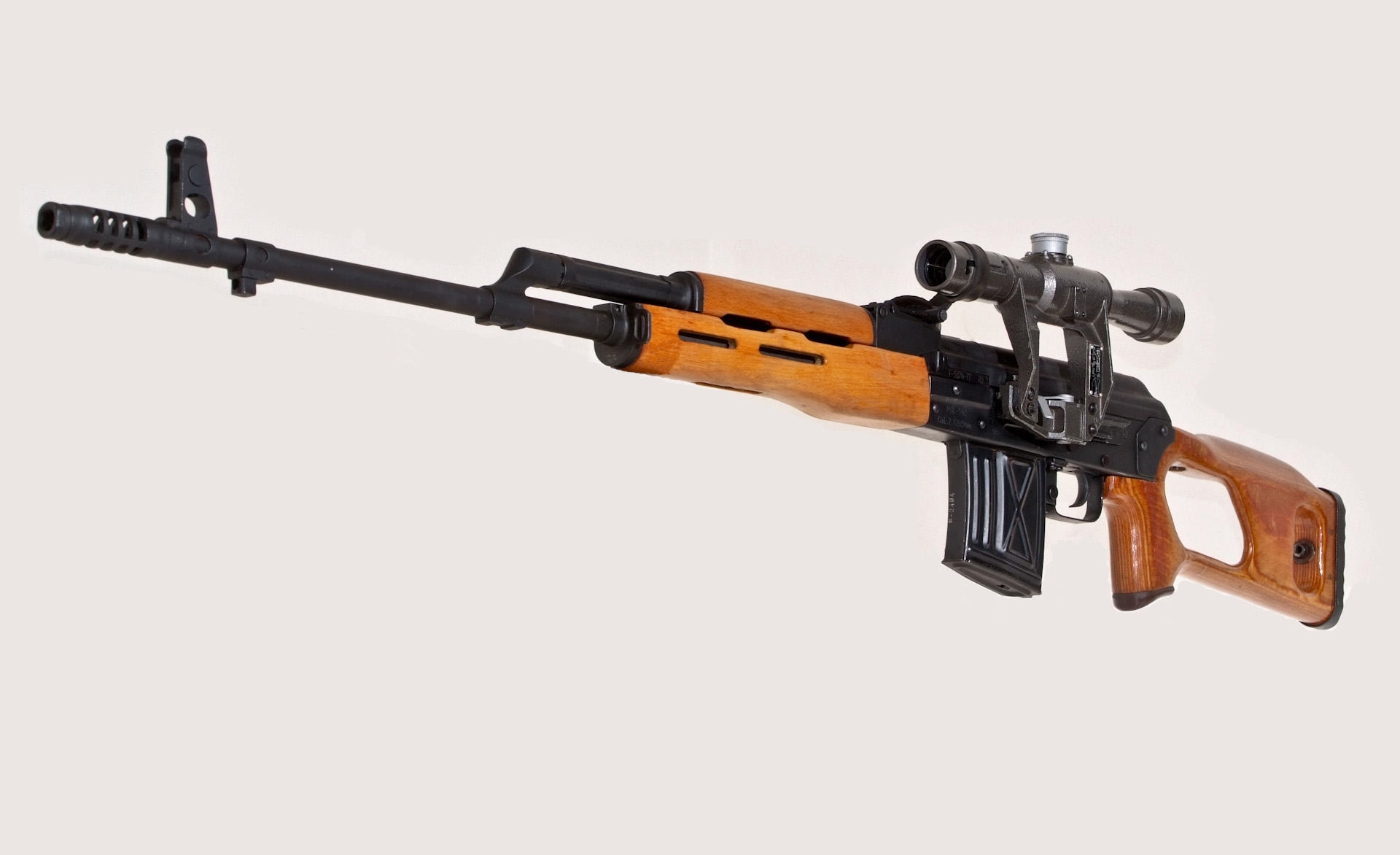
PSL sniper rifle

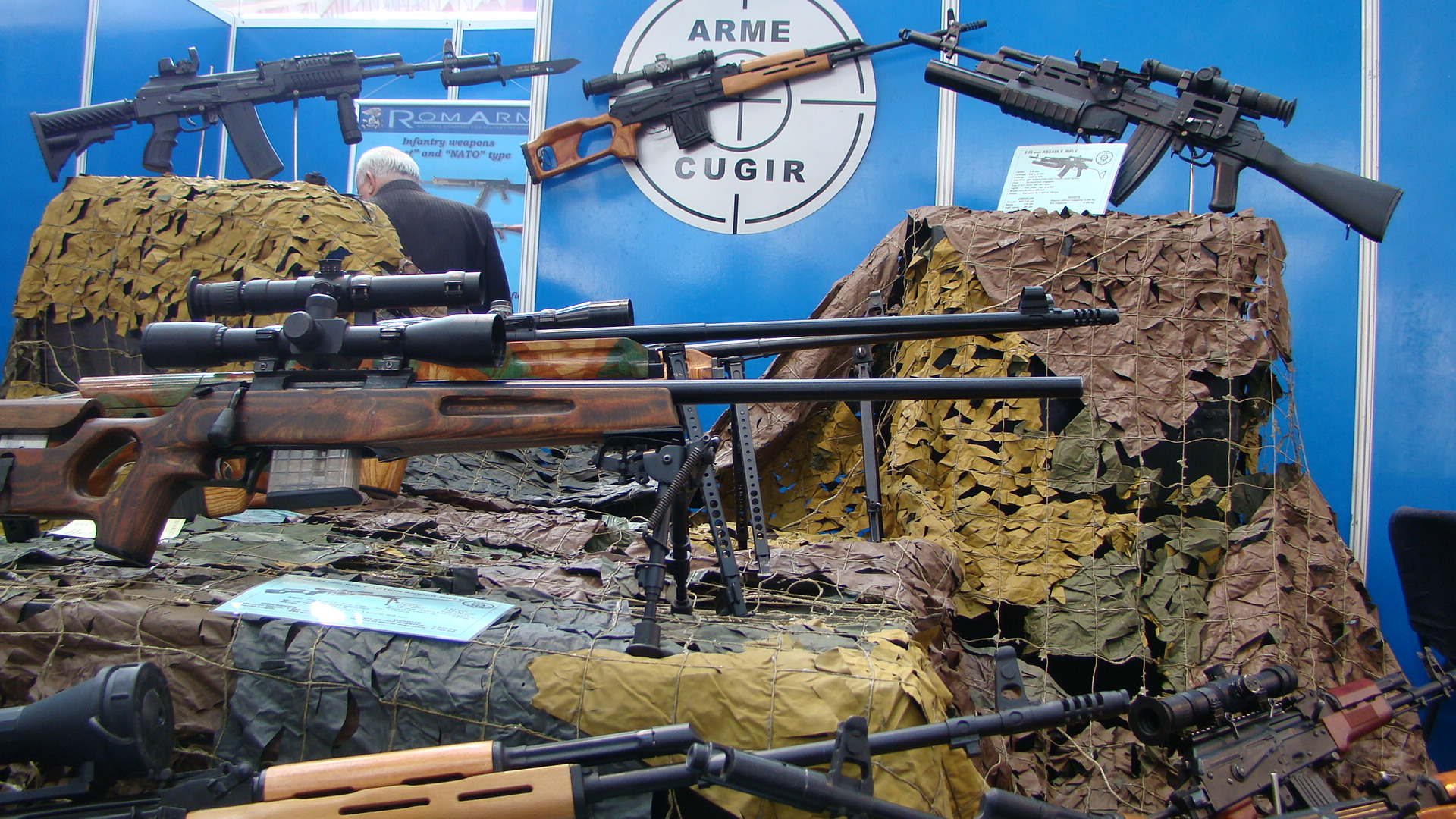
Small arms made by UM Cugir

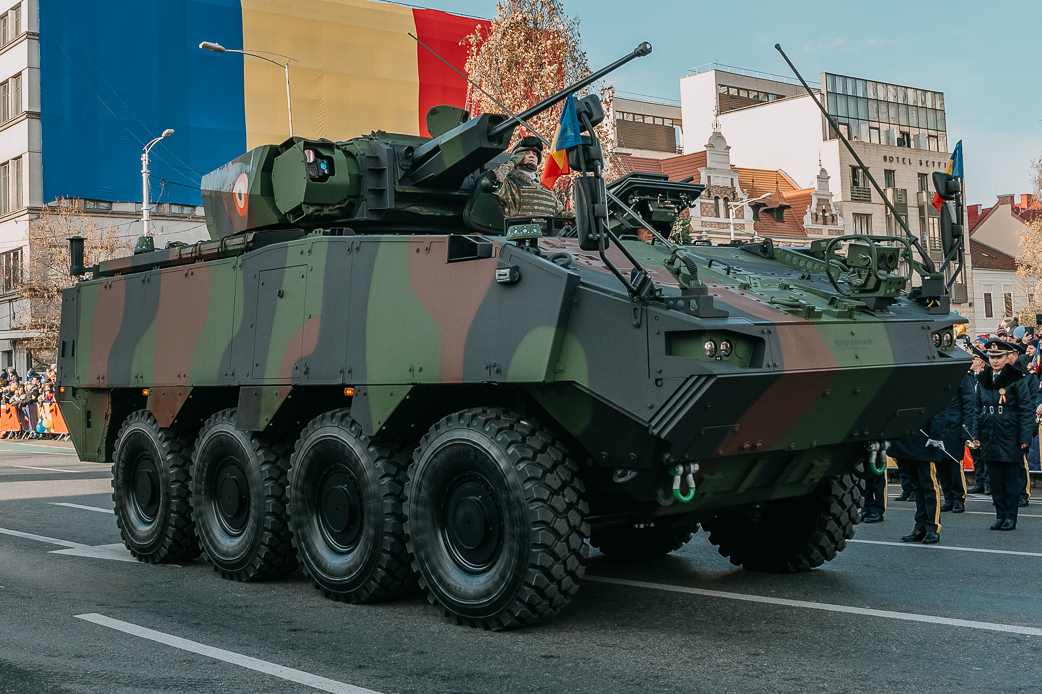
Piranha V wheeled infantry fighting vehicle

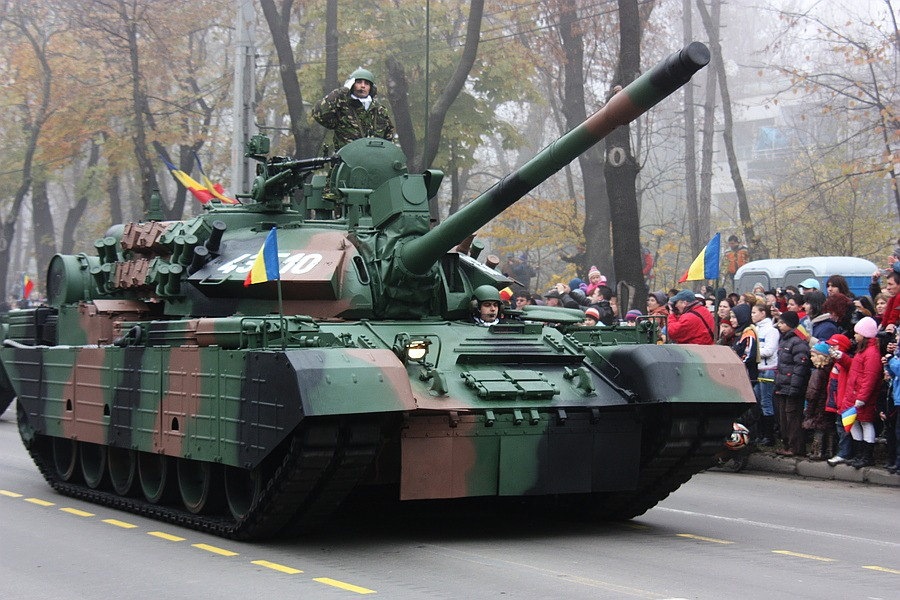
TR-85M1 Bison tank

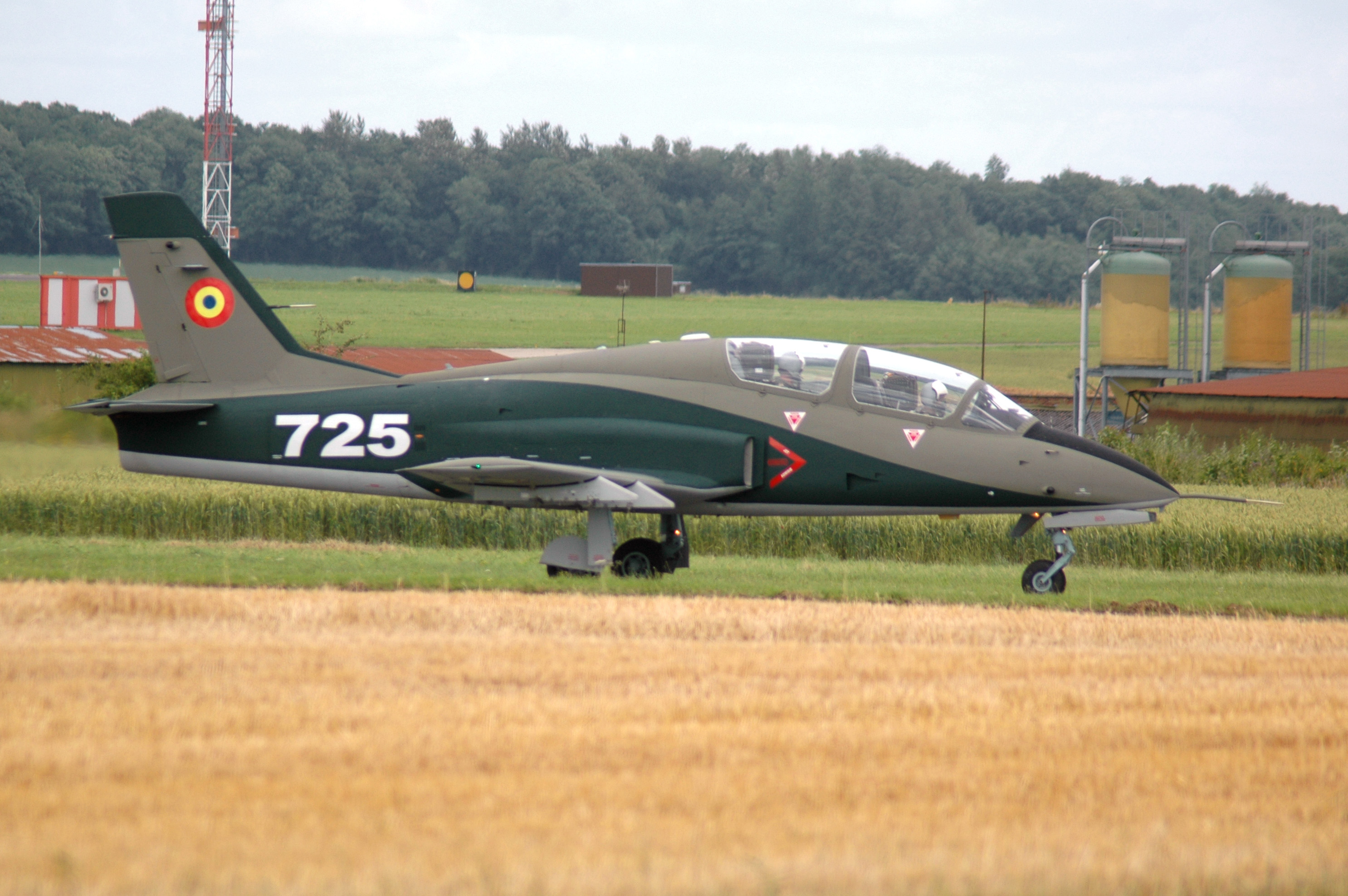
IAR 99 Șoim

Before 1989, Romania was among the top ten arms exporters in the world, however its arms industry declined considerably during the 1990s. Exports fell from roughly $1 billion before 1989 to about $43 million in 2006, and the number of employees also fell from 220,000 in 1990 to 20,000 in 2009. Sales to the Romanian Armed Forces have plunged after Romania's accession to NATO in 2004, as factories continue to produce Warsaw Pact-caliber weapons and ammunition, which are incompatible with their Western counterparts.

As of 2009, sales are roughly evenly divided between the Romanian state and foreign customers such as European Union and Arab countries such as Egypt, Algeria and Iraq. Other countries which have shown interest in Romanian equipment include Afghanistan, Israel, Switzerland, the United States, the United Arab Emirates, India, Georgia and a slew of African countries. There have been some signs of slight recovery, with exports reaching €141 million in 2009. However, the arms industry in Romania still lagged behind neighboring countries such as Ukraine, Bulgaria and Serbia.

With the start of the war in Ukraine in 2022, Romania's arms exports sharply increased, passing over €1 billion worth of exports in 2023. In 2024, 864 million euros of arms exports were reported. Some of the top customers for Romanian arms, which included small arms, ammunition, optics and other subassemblies, were Israel, Ukraine, Bulgaria, the Czech Republic and the United States.

== Manufacturers ==
- Aerostar
- Avioane Craiova
- Industria Aeronautică Română
- Romaero
- Autonomous Flight Technologies
- BlueSpace Technology
- Stimpex SA
- I.O.R.
- Pro Optica
- ROMARM
  - Arsenal Reșița
  - Bucharest Mechanical Factory
  - Carfil Brașov
  - Uzinele Mecanice Cugir
  - UPS Dragomirești
  - Electromecanica Ploiești
  - Fagaraș Powders Factory
  - Metrom
  - Mija Mechanical Plant
  - Uzina Automecanica Moreni
  - Pirochim Victoria
  - Plopeni Mechanical Plant
  - Sadu Mechanical Plant
  - Tohan Mechanical Plant
- Constanța Shipyard
- Galați shipyard
- Giurgiu shipyard

== Weapons and equipment ==
=== Small arms ===
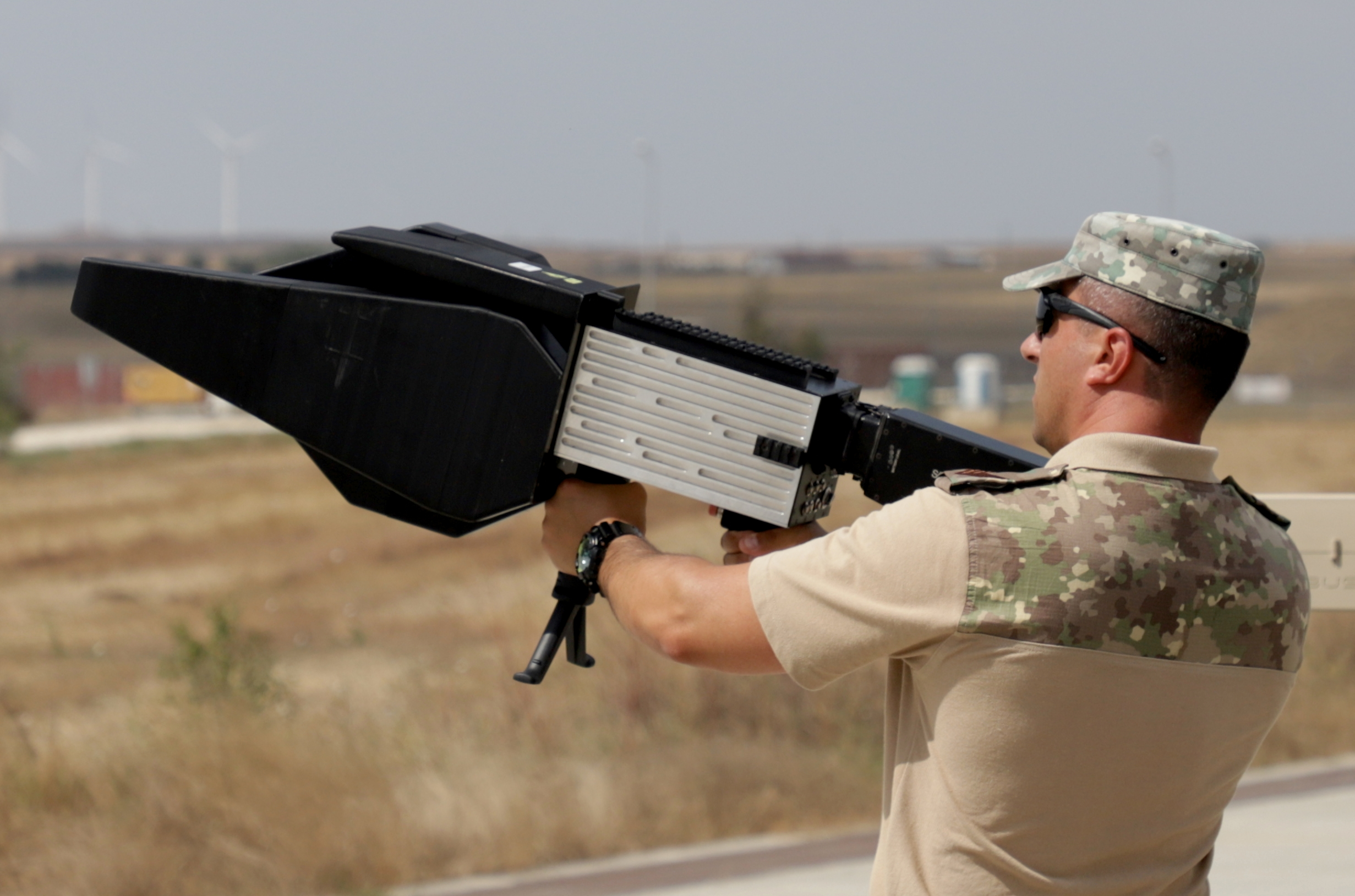
SILENTA 6001 anti-drone rifle

- PA md. 86 assault rifle and carbine
- PM md. 63/65/90 assault rifle and carbine
- Pistol model 2000 handgun
- RATMIL SMG submachine gun
- Mitralieră md. 93 5.45×39mm LMG
- PM md. 64 7.62×39mm light machine gun
- PSL sniper rifle
- Dracula md. 98 machine pistol
- Mitraliera md. 66 7.62×54mmR Machine Gun
- PKT 7.62×54mmR Tank Machine Gun
- DShK 12,7x108mm Heavy Machine Gun
- ZPU 14,5x114mm x1 x2 x4 Heavy Machine Gun
- AG-7 rocket propelled grenade
- AG-9 Rocket propelled grenade
- CA-94 surface-to-air missile system
- SILENTA 6001 anti-drone rifle

=== Remote controlled weapon stations ===
- Pro Optica Anubis

=== AFVs ===
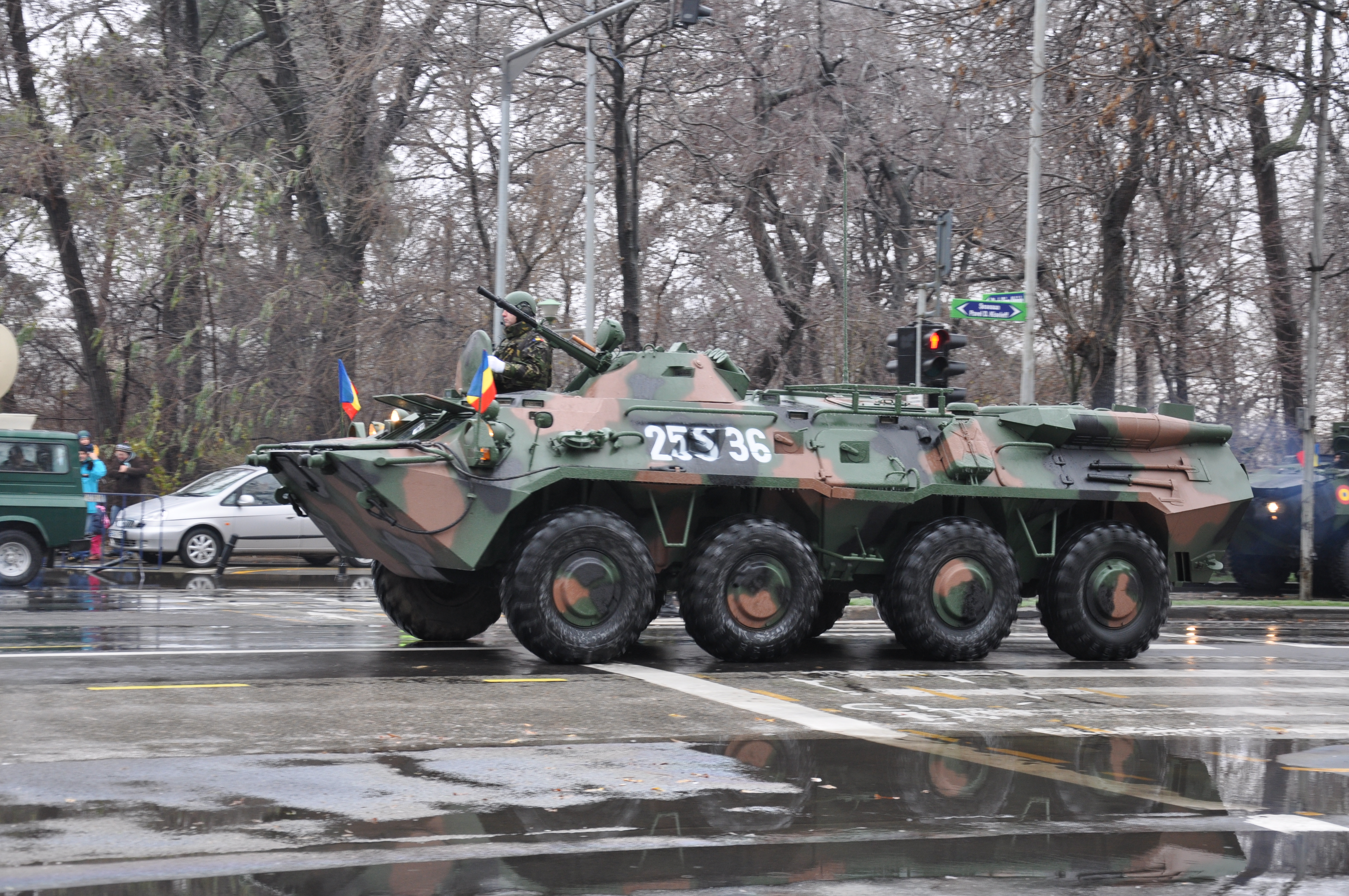
B-33 Zimbru APC (licensed built BTR-80)

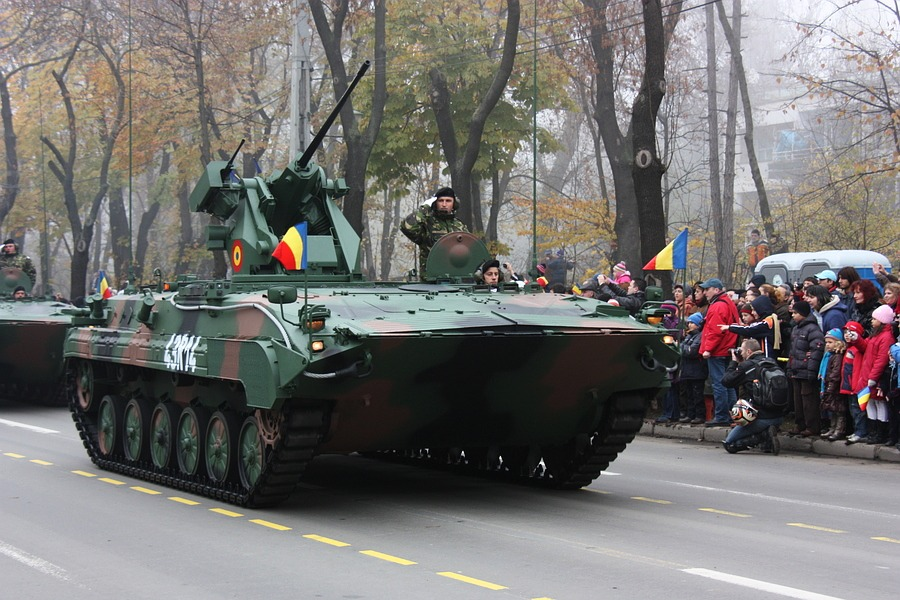
MLI-84M infantry fighting vehicle

- TR-77-580 main battle tank
- TR-85/TR-85 M1 main battle tank
- TR-125 main battle tank
- MLI-84/MLI-84M infantry fighting vehicle
- MLVM tracked armored personnel carrier
- Piranha V wheeled infantry fighting vehicle (produced under license)
- TAB-71 armored personnel carrier
- TAB-77 armored personnel carrier
- ABC-79M armored personnel carrier
- B33 Zimbru armored personnel carrier
- RN-94 armored personnel carrier
- Saur 1 armored personnel carrier
- Saur-2 armored personnel carrier
- ARO-244 ABI armored 4x4 vehicle
- Stimpex Dracon armored 4x4 vehicle
- CA-95 mobile anti-air missile system

=== Artillery ===
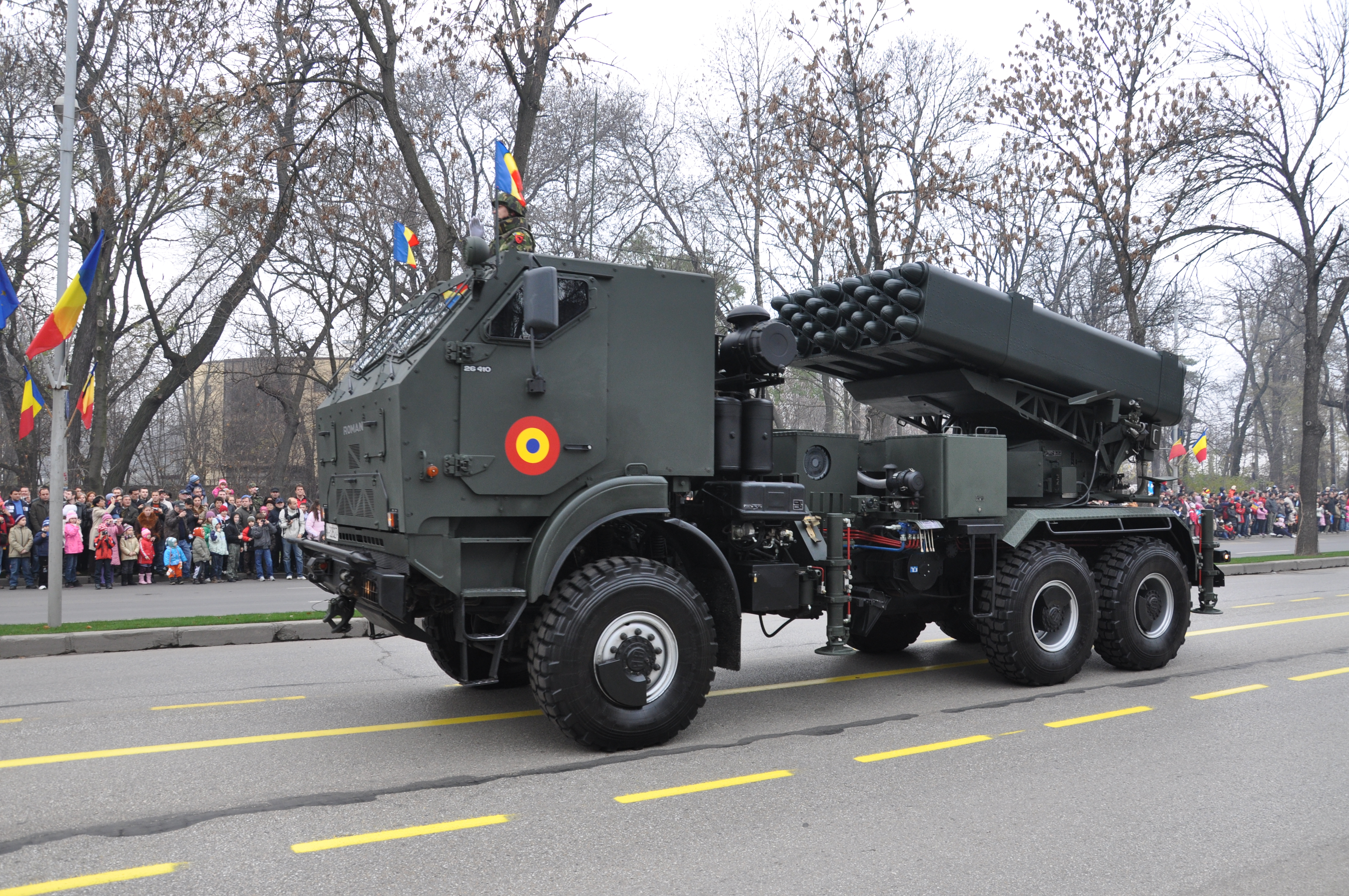
LAROM multiple rocket launcher

- M30M 122 mm howitzer (modernized M1938 (M-30) variant)
- M1980/1988 30 mm x 3 towed anti-aircraft gun
- M1988 60 mm infantry mortar
- M1977 81/82 mm infantry mortar
- M1982 120 mm infantry mortar
- M1982 76 mm mountain gun (based on the M48)
- M1993 98 mm mountain howitzer
- M1977 100 mm antitank gun (similar to the 2A19/T-12)
- M1982 130 mm towed field gun M1954 (M-46)
- M1981 152 mm towed gun-howitzer M1955 (D-20)
- M1985 152 mm howitzer (based on the D-20, similar to the 2A65 Msta-B)
- M-1989 122 mm self-propelled howitzer 2S1
- APR-21 122 mm x 21 rockets
- APR-40 122 mm x 40 rockets
- LAROM MLRS 122 mm x 20 rockets (x 2 containers) / 160 mm x 13 rockets (x 2 containers)
- ATROM 155 mm self-propelled howitzer system

=== Unmanned systems ===
- AFT Hirrus unmanned aerial vehicle

=== Aircraft ===
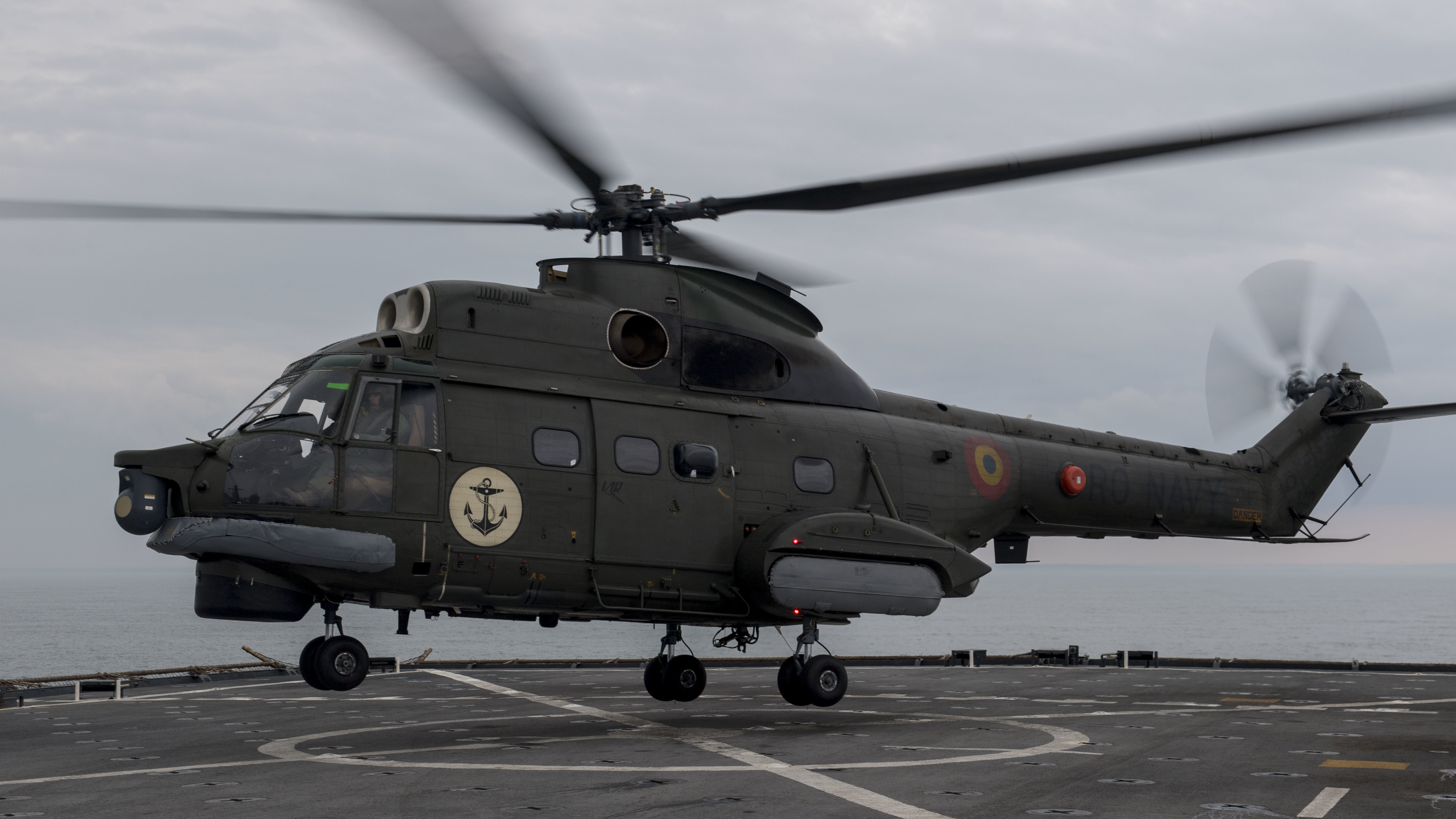
IAR 330 Puma Naval

- IAR 316 training helicopter
- IAR 330 utility helicopter
  - IAR 330 SOCAT attack helicopter
  - IAR 330 NAVAL naval helicopter
- IAR 99 jet trainer and light attack aircraft
- IAR-93 ground attack aircraft and low level interceptor

=== Warships ===
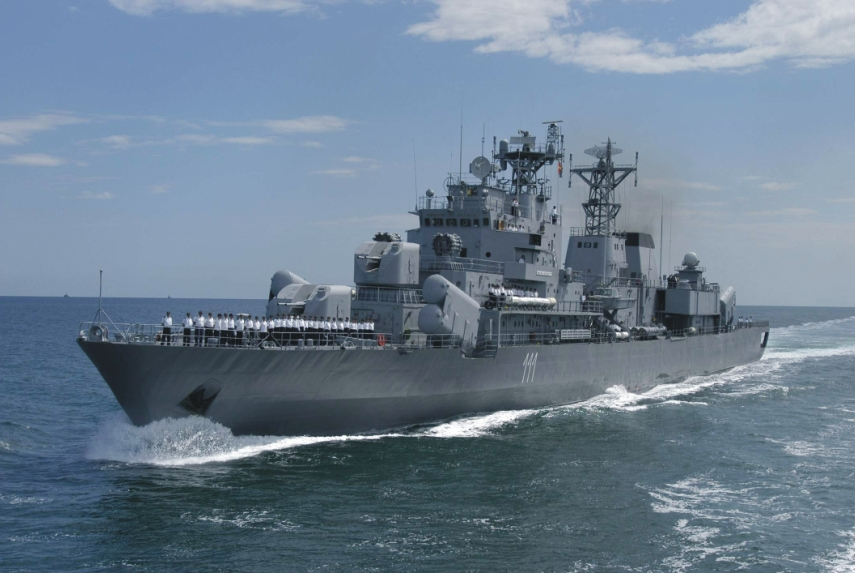
Frigate Mărășești

- Mărășești frigate
- Admiral Petre Bărbuneanu-class corvette (2 ships)
- Rear-Admiral Eustațiu Sebastian-class corvette (2 ships)
- Cosar-class minelayer (2 ships)
- Musca-class minesweeper (4 ships)
- Mihail Kogălniceanu-class river monitor (3 ships)
- Smârdan-class riverine armored patrol boat (4 ships)
- Epitrop-class torpedo boat (12 ships)
- VD 141-class river minesweeper patrol boat (12 ships)

== Weapons produced during World War II and the Interwar period ==
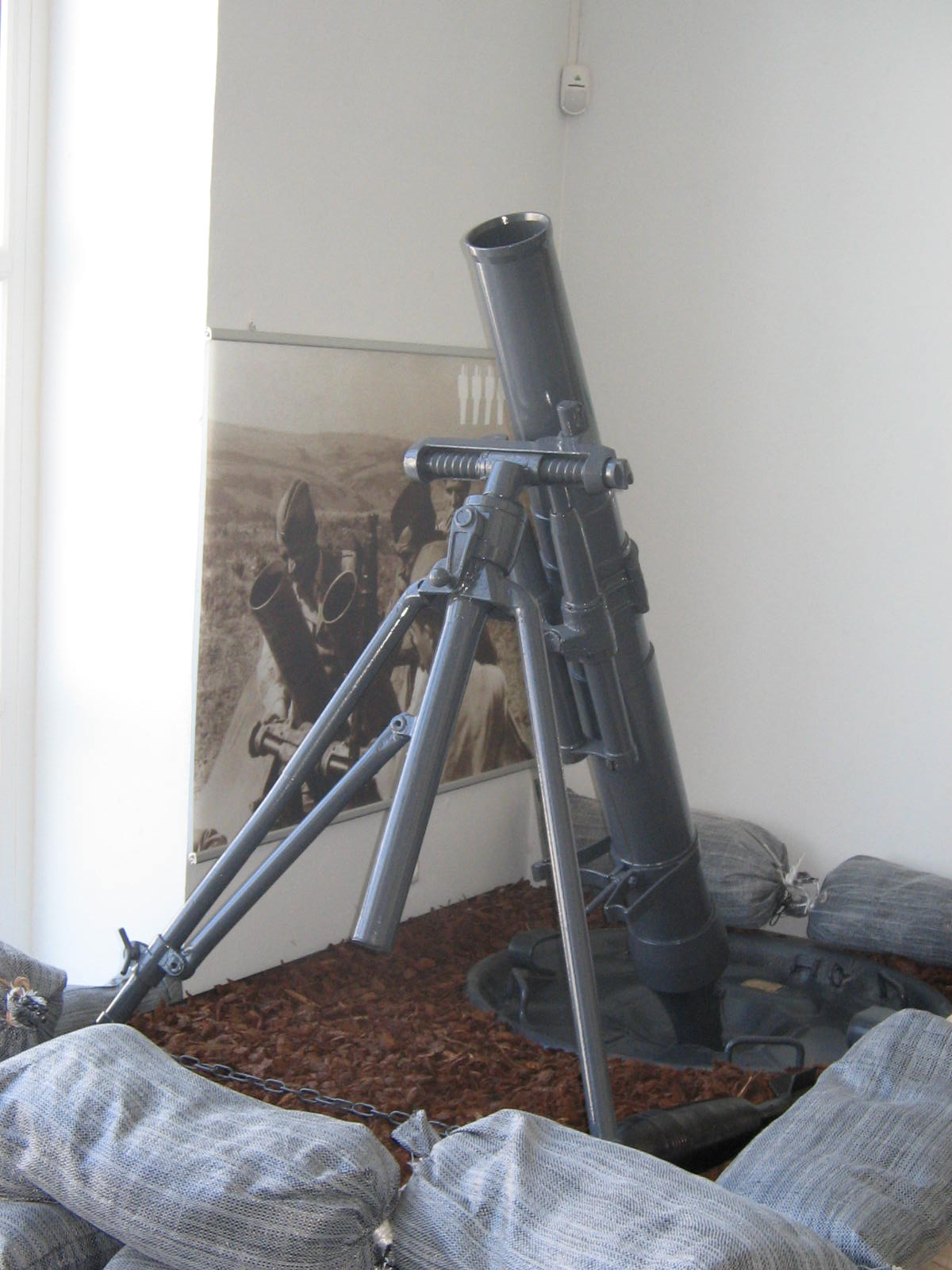
120 mm Reșița mortar

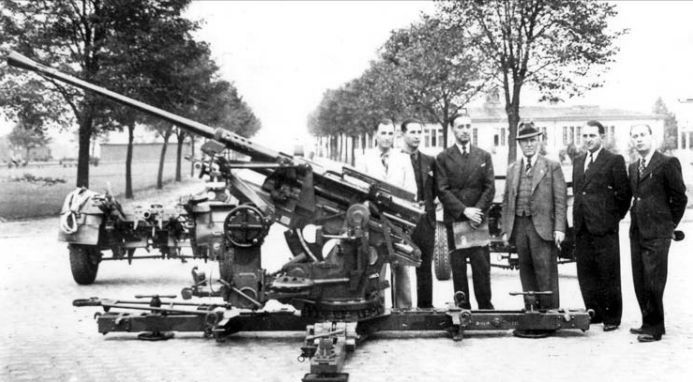
37 mm Astra anti-aircraft gun

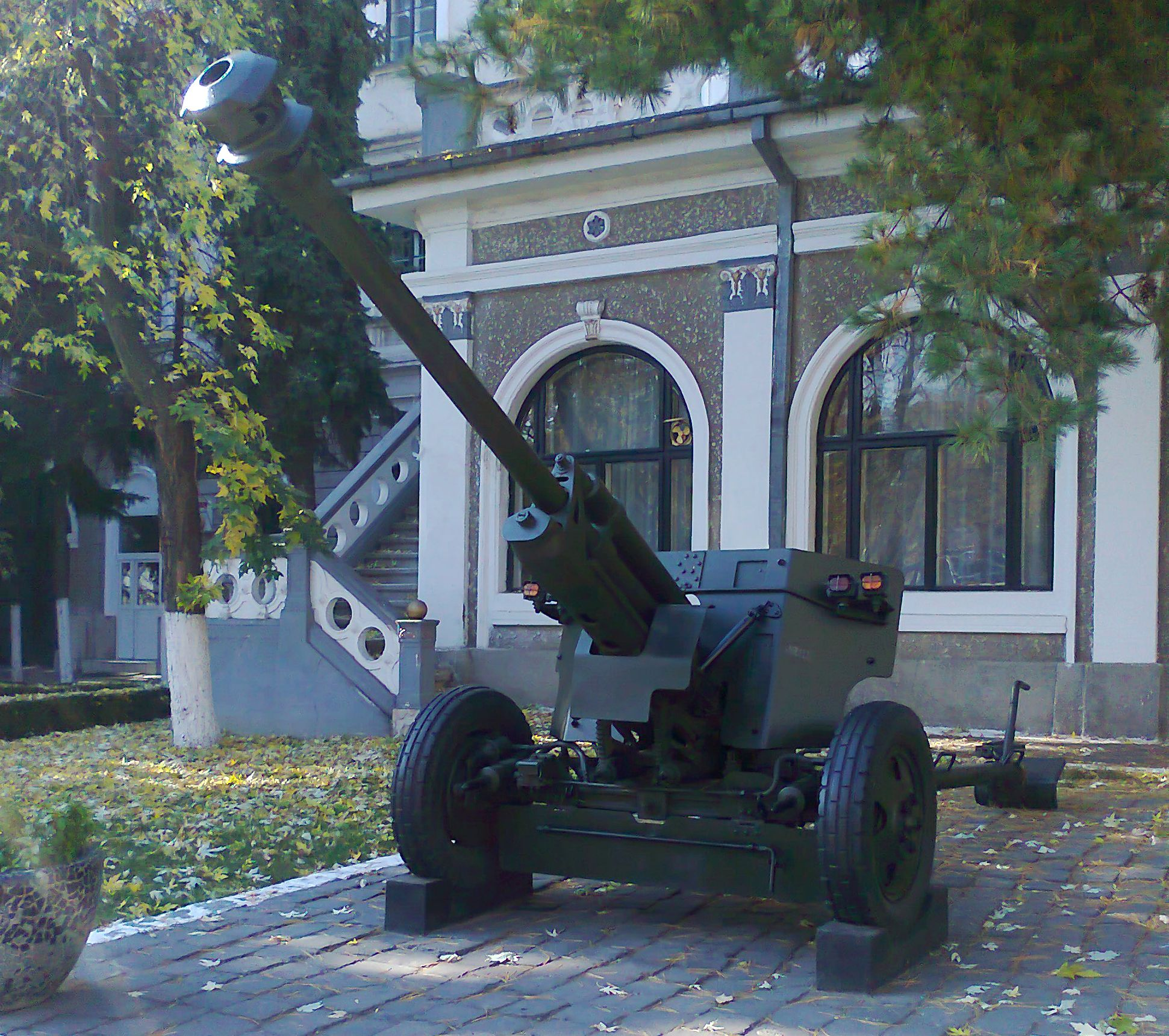
75 mm Reșița anti-tank gun

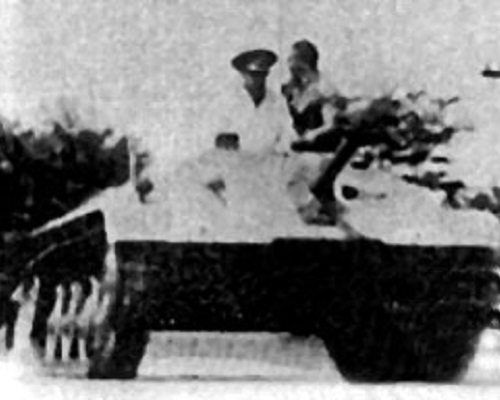
Mareșal tank destroyer

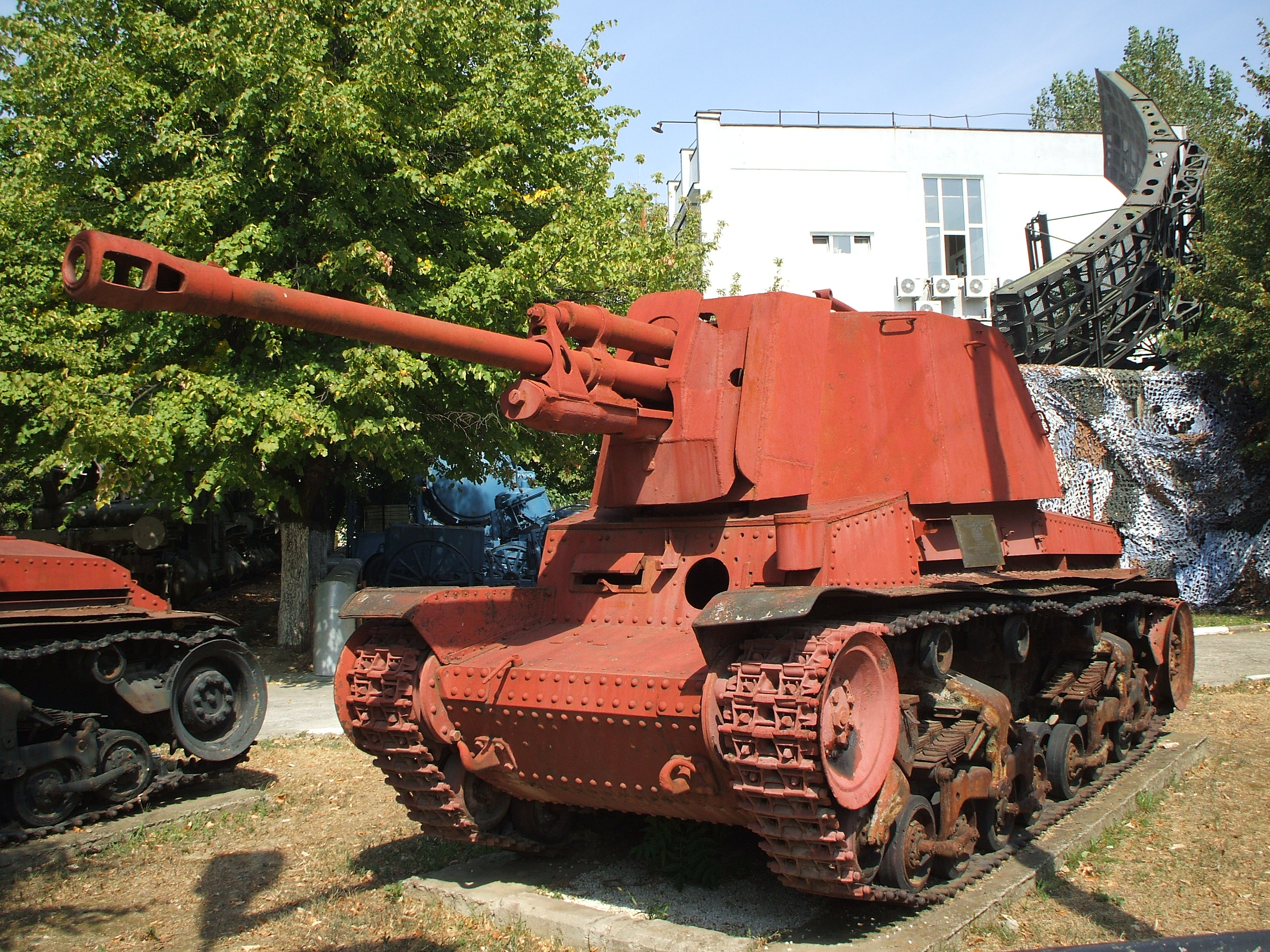
TACAM R-2 tank destroyer

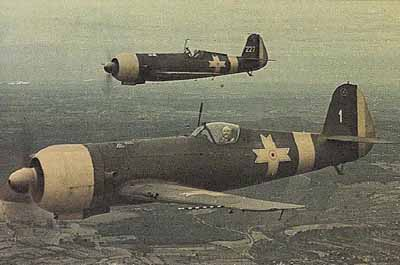
IAR-80 fighter aircraft

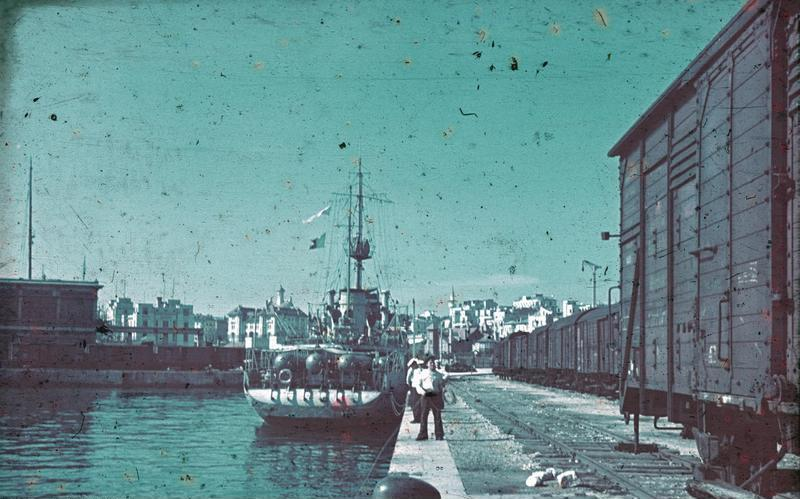
Amiral Murgescu minelayer/destroyer escort

=== Non-self-propelled weapons ===
Vessel	Design/Licence Origin	Number	Notes
Submachine guns
Orița M1941	Romania	6000+	Local design, entered operational service with the Romanian Army in 1943 with a production rate of 666 pieces per month as of October 1942 (6,000 produced until October 1943)
Machine guns
ZB vz. 30	Czechoslovakia	10,000	10,000 licence-built locally at Cugir after Czechoslovak design, with a production rate of 250 pieces per month as of October 1942
Mortars
Brandt Mle 1935	France	1,115+	Licence acquired from France to produce 175 mortars at the Voina Works in Brașov, but the number specified by the licence was far exceeded during the war, with a production rate of 26 pieces per month as of October 1942 (1,115 such mortars were built in Romania by mid-1943)
Brandt Mle 27/31	France	456+	Licence acquired from France to produce 410 mortars at the Voina Works in Brașov, but the number specified by the licence was far exceeded during the war, with a production rate of 30 pieces per month as of October 1942 (456 such mortars were built in Romania by mid-1943)
M1938	Soviet Union	500+	Captured and reverse-engineered Soviet model, produced at the Reșița Works with a production rate of 80 pieces per month as of October 1942 (in total, over 500 of these mortars were built)
Anti-aircraft guns
3.7 cm flak	Germany	360	360 produced under German licence at the Astra Works beginning with 1938, with 102 delivered by May 1941 and a production rate of 6 pieces per month as of October 1942
75 mm Vickers	United Kingdom	200	100 built under British licence by the Reșița Works beginning with 1936, with 100 delivered by mid-1941 and then a second batch of 100 started in July 1941 outside the licence, the production rate being of 5 pieces per month as of October 1942
Anti-tank guns
47 mm Schneider	France	140+	Licence acquired from France to produce 140 guns at the Concordia Works in Ploiești, but the number specified by the licence was far exceeded during the war, with a production rate of 14 pieces per month as of October 1942
75 mm Reșița	Romania	375	Native design combining features from several foreign models, a total of 210 pieces were produced at the Reșița Works, 120 at the Astra Works in Brașov and 42 at the Concordia Works in Ploiești in addition to three prototypes
Field artillery
100 mm Skoda	Czechoslovakia	-	The Astra Works in Romania manufactured gun barrels for these pieces
150 mm Skoda	Czechoslovakia	-	The Astra Works in Romania manufactured gun barrels for these pieces

Romanian monthly armament production (October 1942)

Model	Number
Orița M1941 submachine gun	666
ZB vz. 30 machine gun	250
Brandt 60 mm mortar	26
Brandt 81 mm mortar	30
M1938 120 mm mortar	80
Rheinmetall 37 mm AA gun	6
Vickers 75 mm AA gun	5
Schneider 47 mm AT gun	14

=== Aircraft ===
- IAR 14 fighter (21 built)
- IAR 80 fighter (450 built)
- IAR 37 reconnaissance and light bomber (50 built)
- IAR 38 reconnaissance and light bomber (75 built)
- IAR 39 reconnaissance and light bomber (255 built)
- Morane-Saulnier MS 35 (42 built)
- Potez 25 (260 built)
- Fleet 10G (~430 built)
- PZL P.11 (95 built)
- PZL P.24 (30 built)

=== Warships ===
- Amiral Murgescu minelaying destroyer escort
- Rechinul submarine
- Marsuinul submarine
- Democrația-class minesweeper (4 built)
- Dutch-designed torpedo boats (6 built)
- S-boats (over 10 re-assembled for the Kriegsmarine)
- Type IIB U-boats (6 re-assembled for the Kriegsmarine)

== Weapons produced during World War I and prior ==
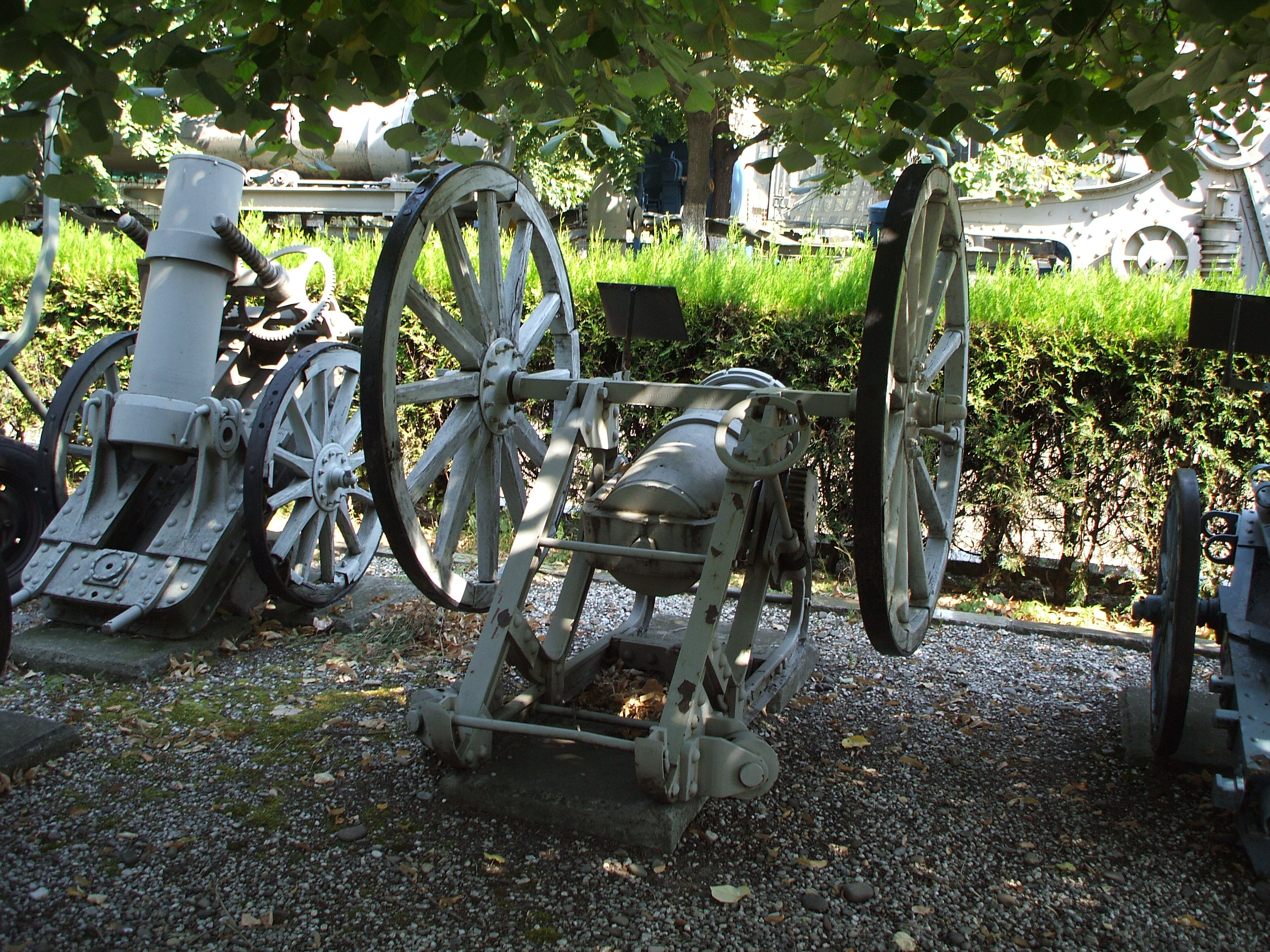
250 mm Negrei mortar

=== Artillery ===
- 250 mm Negrei Model 1916 heavy mortar (unknown numbers)
- 57 mm Burileanu anti-aircraft gun system (132 built)

=== AFVs ===
- Automobil Blindat CFR 1915 armored car (2 built)

=== Aircraft ===
- A Vlaicu I trainer (1 built)
- A Vlaicu II trainer (1 built)
- A Vlaicu III trainer (1 built)
- Farman III trainer (7 built)
- Bréguet-Michelin, Bréguet 5, Caudron G.4, Farman F.40, Nieuport (11, 17, 21, 23, 24bis), Sopwith Strutter, SPAD VII (242-292 assembled)

=== Warships ===
- Brătianu-class river monitor (4 assembled)

== See also ==
- List of equipment of the Romanian Armed Forces
