= OTs-33 Pernach =

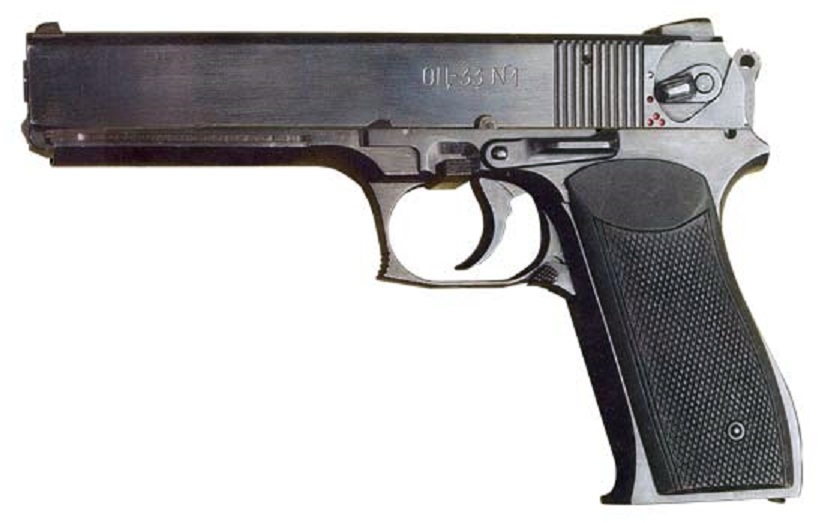
- Pernach OTs-33
- Type: Machine pistol
- Place of origin: Russia

Service history
- In service: 1996–present
- Used by: Russia
- Wars: 2

Production history
- Designer: Igor Stechkin
- Designed: 1995–1996
- Manufacturer: KBP Instrument Design Bureau
- Unit cost: €110
- Produced: 1996-present

Specifications
- Mass: 1,150 g (41 oz)
- Length: 538 mm (21.2 in) with stock 222 mm (8.7 in) without stock
- Barrel length: 135 mm (5.3 in)
- Width: 36.5 mm (1.4 in)
- Height: 143 mm (5.6 in)
- Cartridge: 9×18mm Makarov
- Action: Blowback
- Rate of fire: 800-900 rounds/min
- Muzzle velocity: 330 m/s (1,083 ft/s)
- Effective firing range: 50 m
- Maximum firing range: 100 m
- Feed system: 18 or 27-round detachable box magazine
- Sights: Adjustable rear notch, front blade

The OTs-33 Pernach (ОЦ-33 Пернач, Russian for "pernach") is a Russian 9x18 Makarov machine pistol, derived from the 5.45 mm OTs-23 Drotik machine pistol. The Pernach is an automatic pistol designed to replace the Stechkin APS in various special OMON units within the Russian police, the Russian Ministry of Internal Affairs (MVD) and other paramilitary units. The OTs-33 was developed in 1995 by Igor Stechkin at the TsKIB SOO design bureau, and it went into production at the KBP Instrument Design Bureau. It is also known as the SBZ-2 (Russian: СБЗ-2), derived from the names of the KBP team responsible for the pistol, namely Stechkin, Baltser (Бальцер) and Zinchenko (Зинченко).

The designers were tasked with resolving the difficulty of controlling recoil in full-auto mode present in the Stechkin APS pistol and simplifying it for combat deployment. The new pistol has a "square" shape, which is simpler (and less expensive) to manufacture and has a novel operating principle that increases controllability and reduces recoil.

== Design details ==
The OTs-33 is a selective fire blowback-operated weapon, mechanically similar to the earlier OTs-23 Drotik, firing the more powerful 9×18mm Makarov pistol cartridge. It can use both types of 9×18mm ammunition, the standard 57-N-181S and the more powerful 57-N-181SM round. The blowback operation incorporates a feature somewhat reminiscent of Pedersen's hesitation locking that separates the slide and barrel as they move to the rear during recoil; there is no positive lock between the slide and barrel as in other conventional designs. As the slide and barrel separate, the spent case is ejected and the slide is then forced back to the barrel by a spring action, chambering a fresh cartridge in the process. The barrel and slide continue to the rear together in recoil for another 5 mm (0.2 in) before returning to the forward position. This feature improves the automatic fire accuracy, reduces felt recoil, and is responsible for slowing down the cyclic rate of fire, without using a sophisticated rate reducer mechanism such as the one employed in the APS pistol. This method of operation also allows the use of standard and higher-power 9×18mm ammunition without using a locked-breech action. To further reduce felt recoil and compensate for muzzle rise during firing, some propellant gases are diverted into a ported slide cavity that acts as a muzzle brake and compensator, deflecting the gases upward to stabilize the barrel.

The OTs-33 has a double-action trigger mechanism and is hammer fired, with an exposed hammer. The safety/fire selection catch is provided on each side of the pistol at the rear of the slide and has three positions: "safe" (top setting with a single white dot), semi-automatic fire (intermediate position marked with a single red dot) and fully automatic fire (lower setting with three red dots). When switched to "safe" mode, the selector mechanism safely depresses the hammer before returning to the safe position. An ambidextrous lever, which also serves in disassembly/stripping of the weapon, is provided inside of the trigger guard and just in front of the trigger. The Pernach also features a loaded chamber indicator.

The weapon is aimed using iron sights that consist of an adjustable rear notch and fixed forward blade. The sights have aiming inserts for improved visibility and target acquisition.

A folding metal shoulder stock can be screwed onto a point at the base of the grip in order to alleviate problems aiming the weapon while firing in fully automatic mode.

The OTs-33 is fed using double-column magazines with a capacity of 18 (standard) or 27 (optional) rounds. The OTs-33 frame has an integral accessory rail under the barrel for tactical lights or laser pointers. The pistol can be equipped with a sound suppressor. The OTs-33 is issued with a leather holster that features two separate magazine pouches and a shoulder rig.

== See also ==
- List of Russian weaponry
