= List of equipment of the Armed Forces of the Republic of Uzbekistan =

This is a list of equipment used by the Armed Forces of the Republic of Uzbekistan.

== Ground forces ==
=== Small arms ===
Name	Origin	Type	Caliber	Notes
Pistols
Makarov PM	Soviet Union	Semi-automatic pistol	9×18mm Makarov	
PSM	Soviet Union	Semi-automatic pistol	5.45×18mm	
Fort 12	Ukraine	Semi-automatic pistol	9×18 mm 9×17 mm Kurz	
Rifles and carbines
AKM	Soviet Union	Assault rifle	7.62×39mm	
AK-74	Soviet Union	Assault rifle	5.45×39mm	
AKS-74U	Soviet Union	Assault carbine	5.45×39mm	
SVD	Soviet Union	Designated marksman rifle	7.62×54mmR	
Machine guns
RPK	Soviet Union	Light machine gun	7.62×39mm	
RPK-74	Soviet Union	Light machine gun	5.45×39mm	
PK	Soviet Union	General-purpose machine gun	7.62×54mmR	
NSV	Soviet Union	Heavy machine gun	12.7×108mm	
Anti-tank
RPG-7	Soviet Union	Rocket-propelled grenade	40 mm	
M141 Bunker Defeat Munition	US	Anti-fortification	83 mm	
9M14 Malyutka	Soviet Union	Anti-tank guided missile	125 mm	NATO designation: RS-AT-3 Sagger
9K111 Fagot	Soviet Union	Anti-tank guided missile	120 mm	NATO designation: RS-AT-4 Spigot

Name	Image	Origin	Type	Quantity	Notes
Tanks
T-80		USSR	Main battle tank	100+	T-80BV variant
T-72		USSR	Main battle tank	100+	
T-64		USSR		100	T-64B/MV variant
T-62		USSR	Main battle tank	170	
Armoured reconnaissance vehicles
BRDM-2		Soviet Union	Reconnaissance vehicle	13	
BRM-1		Soviet Union	Reconnaissance vehicle	6	
Infantry fighting vehicles/Armoured fighting vehicles
BMP-2		USSR	Infantry fighting vehicle	270	
BTR-82		USSR	Infantry fighting vehicle	100+	BTR-82A
BMP-1		USSR	Infantry fighting vehicle	180	
BMD-2		USSR / Russian Federation	Armoured combat vehicle	9	
BMD-1		USSR	Armoured combat vehicle	120	
MRAPs and infantry mobility vehicles
Oshkosh M-ATV		United States	MRAP	308	
International MaxxPro		United States	MRAP	50	
Cougar		United States	MRAP	50	
Typhoon-K		Russia	MRAP	100+	
Ejder Yalcin 4x4		Turkey / Uzbekistan	MRAP	24 (1000)	
Tarlon		Uzbekistan	Infantry mobility vehicle	N/A	The upgraded Tarlon-M has a remotely controlled combat module.
Armoured utility vehicles
Cougar		United States	AUV	50	
Oshkosh M-ATV		United States	AUV	250+	
Tigr		Russia	AUV	30+	Tigr-M
Qalqon		Uzbekistan	AUV	N/A	The Qalqon-1 and Qalqon-2 variants are mainly used in the National Guard
Aksum armored cars		Uzbekistan/UAE	AUV	N/A	Aksum MAX-S/V/DS/DS SWAT/GT Aksum COMBAT-S models are in service with the National Guard and special forces
Armoured personnel carriers
BTR-80		USSR	Armoured personnel carrier	210	
BTR-70		USSR	Armoured personnel carrier	25	
BTR-60		USSR	Armoured personnel carrier	44	
BTR-D		USSR	Armoured personnel carrier	50	
Arslon 8x8		Uzbekistan	Armoured personnel carrier	N/A	
Arslon 6x6		Uzbekistan	Armoured personnel carrier	N/A	
Engineering and Maintenance vehicles
Maxxpro		United States	Armoured recovery vehicle	20	
Rocket artillery
BM-21 Grad		USSR	122mm multiple rocket launcher	113	BM-21(BM-19) 9P-138
BM-27 Uragan		USSR	220mm multiple rocket launcher	48	
Anti-aircraft
HQ-9		People's Republic of China	Surface-to-air missile	N/A	
HQ-12		People's Republic of China	Surface-to-air missile	N/A	KS-1C export version
HQ-7		People's Republic of China	Surface-to-air missile	N/A	FM-90 export version
Self-propelled artillery
2S1 Gvozdika		USSR	122mm self-propelled howitzer	18	
2S3 Akatsiya		Soviet Union	152mm self-propelled howitzer	17	
2S5 Giatsint-S		USSR	152mm self-propelled howitzer	N/A	
2S7 Pion		USSR	203mm self-propelled howitzer	48	
2S9 Nona		USSR	Self-propelled 120 mm mortar	54	
To'fon		Uzbekistan	155mm self-propelled howitzer	N/A	Based on the Israeli ATMOS 2000 system
Towed artillery
2A18 (D-30)		USSR	122mm howitzer	60	
2A36 Giatsint-B		USSR	152mm howitzer	140	
MT-12		USSR	100mm anti-tank gun	36	

== Air force ==
Aircraft	Origin	Type	Variant	In service	Notes
Combat aircraft
MiG-29	Union of Soviet Socialist Republics	Multirole fighter	MiG-29A/MiG-29UB	38+	30 more in store
Sukhoi Su-27	Union of Soviet Socialist Republics	Multirole fighter	Su-27A/Su-27UB	34+	All in store
Sukhoi Su-25	Union of Soviet Socialist Republics	Ground attack/Strike aircraft	Su-25T/Su-25BM	20	
Sukhoi Su-24	Union of Soviet Socialist Republics	Ground attack/Strike aircraft	Su-24 Fencer	34	All in store
Transport aircraft
Ilyushin Il-76	Soviet Union	Heavy transport		3	
Antonov An-12	Soviet Union	Medium transport		2	
Antonov An-26	Soviet Union	Light transport		4	
Tupolev Tu-134	Soviet Union	Light transport		1	
CASA C-295	Kingdom of Spain; Europe	Light transport	C-295W	4	
Embraer C-390 Millennium	Brazil	Transport		2 ordered	The delivery contract has been signed.
Boeing 767-300	United States of America	VIP transport		1	UK-67000, governmental plane
Trainer aircraft
Aero L-39 Albatros	Czechoslovakia	Jet trainer		14+	
Mushshak	Sweden / Pakistan	Training aircraft		16+	
Helicopters
Mil Mi-24	Soviet Union	Attack helicopter	Mi-24V	29	
Mil Mi-35	Soviet Union	Attack helicopter	Mi-35M	12	
Mil Mi-26	Soviet Union	Heavy transport helicopter		1	
Airbus H215m	French Republic; Germany; Europe	Heavy transport helicopter	Medium transport helicopter		16
Eurocopter AS350	France; West Germany; Europe Federative Republic of Brazil (license); Republic of India (future)	Light utility helicopter		20	
Unmanned aerial vehicles
Bayraktar TB2	Republic of Türkiye	UCAV/ISR		4+	
TAI Anka	Republic of Türkiye	UAV/UCAV	Anka-S	N/A	
Wing Loong II	People's Republic of China	UCAV/ISR		N/A	

== Bibliography ==
- International Institute for Strategic Studies (12 February 2024). "Chapter Four: Russia and Eurasia". The Military Balance. 124 (1): 158–217. doi:10.1080/04597222.2024.2298592. ISSN 0459-7222.
- Jones, Richard D; Ness, Leland, eds. (2010). Jane's Infantry Weapons 2010-2011 (36th ed.). Surrey: Jane's Information Group. ISBN 978-0-7106-2908-1.
