= Stechkin =

Stechkin (masculine, Russian: Стечкин) or Stechkina (feminine, Russian: Стечкина) is a Russian surname. Notable people with the surname include:

- Boris Stechkin (1891–1969), Soviet–Russian engineer, inventor, and scientist
- Igor Stechkin (1922–2001), Russian small arms designer
- Sergey Stechkin (1920–1995), Soviet mathematician

== See also ==
- The Stechkin APS pistol
