= OTs-23 Drotik =

OTs-23 DROTIK
- Type: Machine pistol
- Place of origin: Russia

Service history
- In service: Russian Federation Interior Ministry(MVD)
- Used by: Russia

Production history
- Designer: I. Stechkin, A.V. Baltser, and A.V. Zinchenko
- Designed: 1993
- Manufacturer: KBP Instrument Design Bureau

Specifications
- Mass: 960 g
- Length: 195 mm
- Barrel length: 125 mm
- Width: 32 mm
- Height: 135 mm
- Cartridge: 5.45x18mm MPT
- Action: Blowback
- Rate of fire: 1,800 rounds/min
- Muzzle velocity: 320 m/s
- Effective firing range: 50 m
- Feed system: 24 round detachable, double-column, box magazine
- Sights: Fixed

The OTs-23 Drotik (ОЦ-23 Дротик, Russian for "dart") is a blow-back operated machine pistol developed and used in Russia. The gun is also known as SBZ (Russian: СБЗ) from the initials of its designers — I. Stechkin, A.V. Baltser (А.В. Бальцер), and A.V. Zinchenko (А.В. Зинченко)

The weapon has a three-position select fire switch; safe, semi-automatic, and three-round burst. The pistol features an external indicator that allows the operator to quickly see how many cartridges remain in the magazine.

It is designed as a special operations and personal defence weapon (PDW). It has compensator openings cut into the end of the barrel to vent gases and make the weapon more stable during automatic burst fire. The action is blowback complicated with a principle borrowed from Pedersen's hesitation locking: after passing 42 mm and ejecting the case the free-moving bolt locks with the barrel and uses its inertia to stop in the last 5 mm of recoil.

Very few of these guns were manufactured; it was however the basis of the development of the OTs-33. The 5.45×18mm MPT cartridge, although successful in the PSM pistol, was considerably underpowered for a gun of this size and intended for PDW role.

== See also ==
- List of Russian weaponry
- Lercker pistol — similar Italian weapon
