= OTs-01 Kobalt =

- Type: Revolver
- Place of origin: Soviet Union

Service history
- In service: 1992-present
- Used by: Russia

Production history
- Designer: Igor Stechkin, Boris Avraamov
- Designed: 1991-1992
- Manufacturer: KBP Instrument Design Bureau
- Produced: 1992-2002 (OTs-01); 1996-present (OTs-01S)
- Variants: See Variants

Specifications
- Mass: 790 g (28 oz) (small wooden grips); 820 g (29 oz) (large plastic grips)
- Length: 200 mm (7.9 in)
- Barrel length: 75 mm (3.0 in)
- Width: 37 mm (1.5 in)
- Height: 136 mm (5.4 in)
- Cartridge: 9×18mm Makarov (OTs-01); 9x17 mm Short (OTs-01S)
- Action: Double action
- Effective firing range: 25 m
- Maximum firing range: 50 m
- Feed system: 6-round cylinder
- Sights: Fixed; front blade and rear notch

The OTs-01 Kobalt (Russian: ОЦ-01 "Кобальт", "Cobalt") is a Russian double-action 9 mm revolver designed by Igor Stechkin and Boris Avraamov.

The revolver was developed by TsKIB SOO from 1991 to 1992 and was meant for sale to the Ministry of Internal Affairs and to law enforcement. In 1992 it was adopted by Ministry of the Interior of the Russian Federation as service weapon under designation RSA (Revolver Stechkina-Avraamova). Since 1994 it was also manufactured by "Zlatoust Machine-Building Plant" and "Uralsk Machine-Building Plant" under designation TKB-0216 (ТКБ-0216).

== Description ==
The revolver resembles a Smith & Wesson "J"-frame revolver, with its small frame, "bird's head" grip and an external hammer. There is a safety on the left-hand side of the grip that locks the cylinder and hammer to prevent it from accidental discharge.

Since it fires rimless cartridges, the six-shot revolver is cut for "moon clips", sheet-metal holders that grasp the rounds by the base to allow them to be extracted easily.

The revolver uses a special Y-shaped "moon clip" that loads alternate chambers and locks into the other "moon clip". This allows alternating types of ammunition (like hollow point or armor-piercing) to be loaded into the same cylinder and allows the user to reload a special type of ammunition and keep the other type in reserve. It can also be used without the "moon clips", but the spent cases would not be extractable unless pushed out from the front of the cylinder with a rod-like object, like a pen or pencil.

== Variants ==
- RSA (Револьвер Стечкина-Авраамова) - model chambered for 9×18mm Makarov. It was manufactured from 1992 until 2002.

- OTs-01 (OЦ-01 "Кобальт") - original variant chambered for 9×18mm Makarov. The revolver was manufactured in Tula by its parent company KBP. This early model has polygonal rifling.
- TKB-0216 (ТКБ-0216) - second variant chambered for 9×18mm Makarov. This model was manufactured since 1994 by "Zlatoust Machine-Building Plant" and "Uralsk Machine-Building Plant". The rifling twist of this variant barrel has 4 grooves, right hand twist.

- OTs-01S (ОЦ-01С) - variant chambered for 9x17 mm Short. It was designed as a sidearm for private security or a holdout or backup pistol for bodyguards or VIPs that require concealed firepower. It was produced since 1996.
- TKB-0216T «Agent» (ТКБ-0216Т «Агент») - non-lethal revolver chambered for .380 ME GUM cartridge with rubber bullet. This model manufactured by "Zlatoust Machine-Building Plant"

== Users ==
- Armenia: used as service firearm in police;
- Kazakhstan - since 2005 adopted as service firearm for custom service
- Russia - prison guards, security guards of Ministry of Agriculture of the Russian Federation and law enforcement

== See also ==
- List of Russian weaponry

== Sources ==
- 9-мм револьвер ОЦ-01 (ТКБ-0216). Паспорт ОЦ-01 ПС
- 9-мм револьвер РСА. Техническое описание и инструкция по эксплуатации ТКБ-0216ТО - 1992 г.
