= Igor Stechkin =

Russian small arms designer (1922–2001)

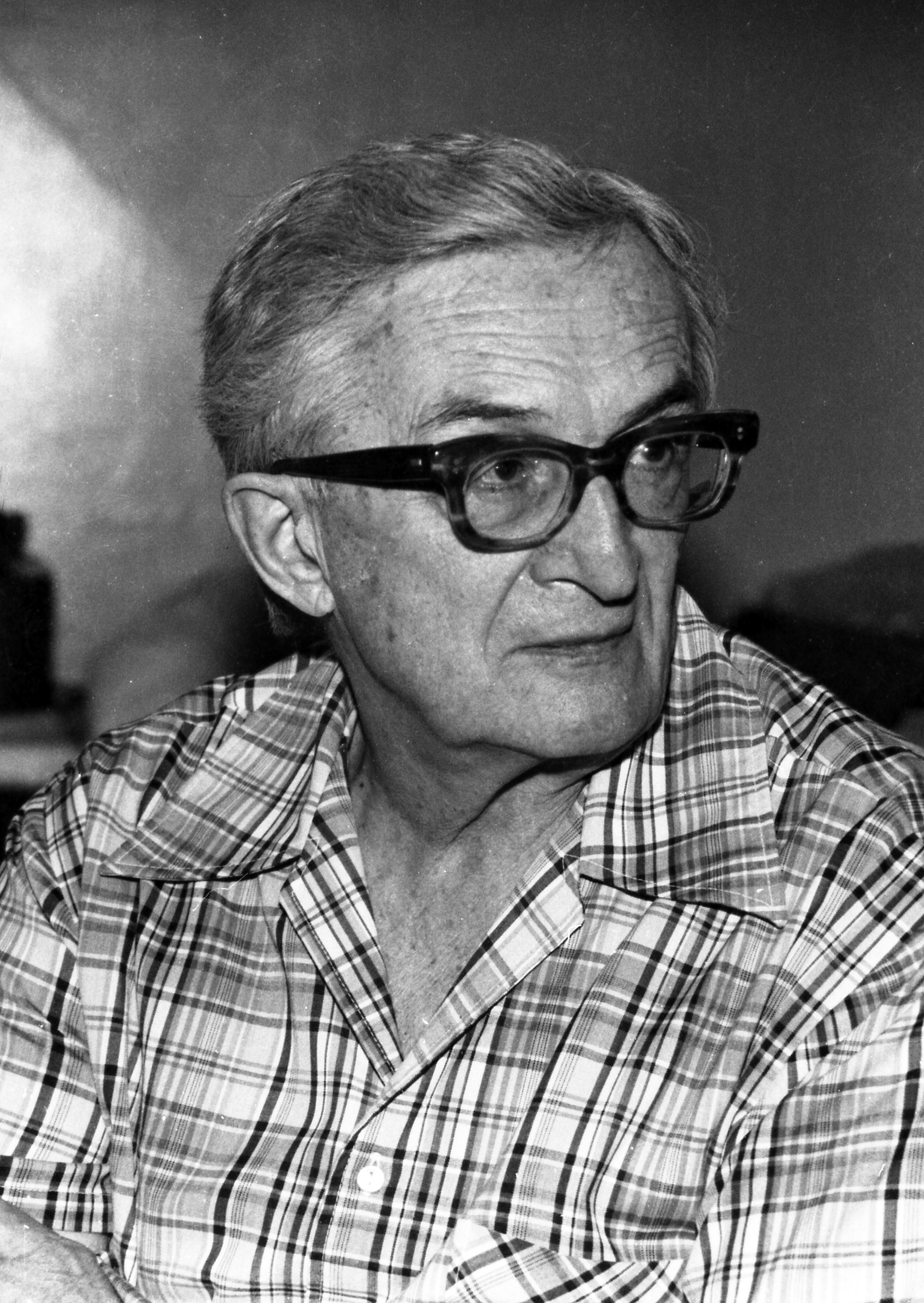

Igor Yakovlevich Stechkin (Russian: Игорь Яковлевич Стечкин; 15 November 1922 – 28 November 2001) was a Russian small arms designer.

== Designs ==
- Stechkin automatic pistol, 9mm machine pistol
- TKB-506, prototype handgun designed to look like a cigarette case
- TKB-486, a prototype submachine gun in 9×18mm
- TKB-0116, prototype compact assault rifle, lost design competition to AKS74U
- TKB-0146, prototype assault rifle entered in Project Abakan, but lost to AN-94
- OC-01 Kobalt, double-action 9 mm revolver
- OC-23 Drotik, 5.45 mm machine pistol
- OC-27 Berdysh, 9 mm semi-automatic pistol
- OC-33 Pernach, 9 mm machine pistol
- OC-38 Stechkin silent revolver

== See also ==
- Boris Stechkin, his uncle
