= Romanian minelayer Viceamiral Constantin Bălescu =

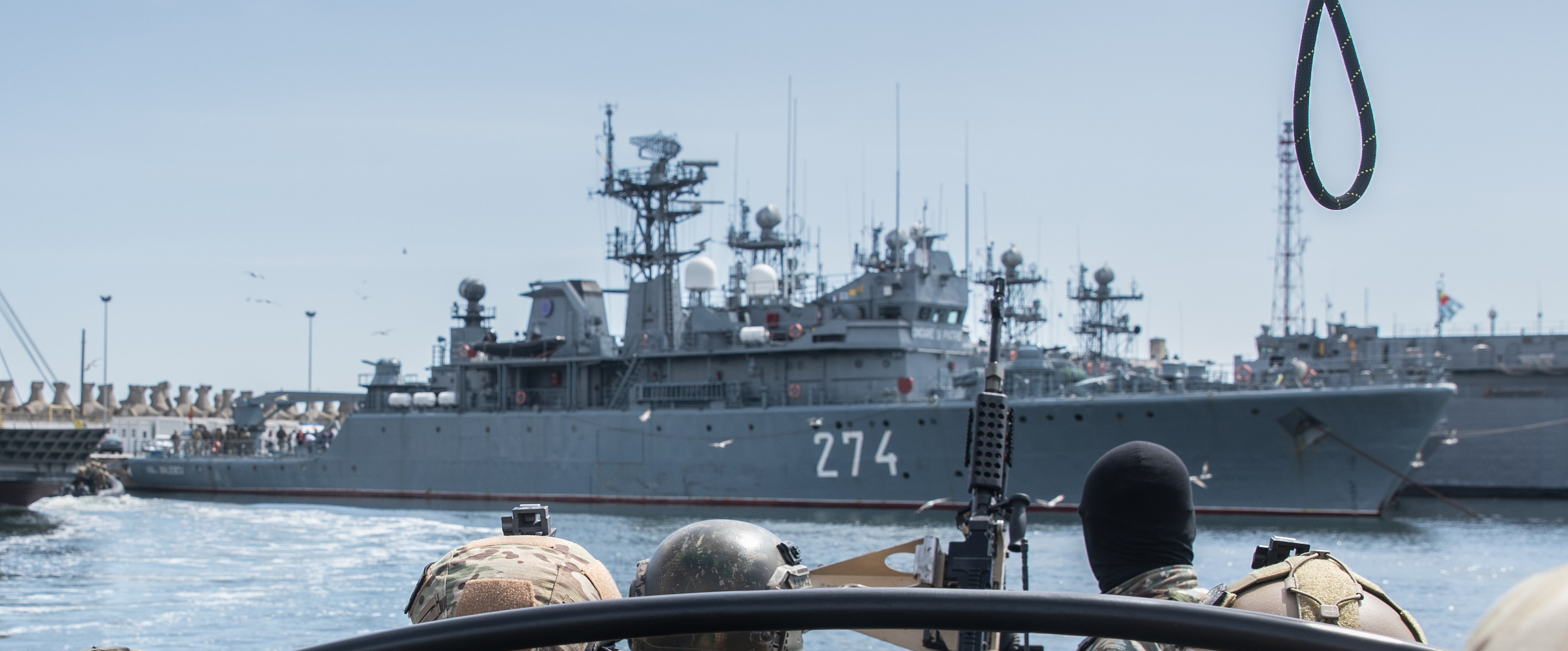
- Viceamiral Constantin Bălescu (PM-274) during Naval Special Operations Forces training in 2022

History

Romania
- Name: Viceamiral Constantin Bălescu
- Namesake: Constantin Bălescu
- Builder: 2 May Naval Shipyard, Mangalia
- Launched: 30 September 1981
- Commissioned: 16 November 1981
- Home port: Constanța
- Identification: Pennant number: PM-274; MMSI number: 264000000; MarineTraffic ID: 6169371; Callsign:YQXT
- Status: In active service

General characteristics
- Class & type: Cosar-class minelayer
- Displacement: 1,451 t (1,428 long tons)
- Length: 78.42 m (257 ft 3 in)
- Beam: 10.6 m (34 ft 9 in)
- Draught: 3.4 m (11 ft 2 in)
- Installed power: 3 × Baudouin 6W126S AC diesel generators; 1 × Volvo Penta diesel generator (backup)
- Propulsion: 2 × ALCO V12 diesel engines, 3,285 hp (2,450 kW)
- Speed: 19 knots (35 km/h; 22 mph)
- Complement: 76
- Sensors & processing systems: MR-123 Vympel (NATO: "Bass Tilt") fire-control radar; Koden navigation radar; JRC navigation radar
- Armament: 1 × 30 mm (1.2 in) AK-306 CIWS; 2 × 30 mm (1.2 in) AK-230 CIWS; 2 × quadruple MR-4N anti-aircraft machineguns; 2 × 12.7 mm (0.50 in) Anubis RCWS; 2 × RL 1000 depth charge launchers; 2 × FASTA 4 Strela-2M surface-to-air missile launchers; 100 × naval mines

Viceamiral Constantin Bălescu (PM-274) is a minelayer of the Romanian Naval Forces. She was launched on 30 September 1981 and entered service on 16 November 1981.

== History ==
Viceamiral Constantin Bălescu was designed by ICEPRONAV Galați under Project 882/3, and was launched on 30 September 1981 in Mangalia. She is currently assigned to the 146th Mining-Demining Ships Divizion from Constanța. As a minelayer, she is tasked with laying defensive minefields, launching and supervising hydroacoustic buoys, as well as neutralizing minefields, and the transport of personnel and equipment.

Between 2018 and 2021, the ship went through several upgrades. During this period the AK-306 close-in weapon system, as well as the Anubis remote controlled weapon stations were mounted, and the power generators were modernized.

During her career, she participated in various national and international NATO exercises such as Cooperative Partner, Sea Shield, and Sea Breeze. Between January and June 2020, Viceamiral Constantin Bălescu was the flagship commanding the Standing NATO Mine Countermeasures Group 2. In October 2020, the ship participated in the Nusret 20 exercise organized by the Turkish Naval Forces in the Aegean Sea.

As part of Operation Irini between October 2021 and January 2022, Viceamiral Constantin Bălescu checked over 230 suspicious commercial ships and executed 25 IMINT missions, also carrying out visits to promote the values of the European Union and raise awareness of maritime security importance.

== Sister ship ==
Commissioned on 30 December 1980, Viceamiral Ion Murgescu (PM-271) was the sister ship of Viceamiral Constantin Bălescu. Both ships were based on the shape plan of the survey vessel Grigore Antipa. Viceamiral Ion Murgescu was retired in 2004 and scrapped in 2011.
