= Stechkin automatic pistol =

Type of Soviet machine pistol

Stechkin
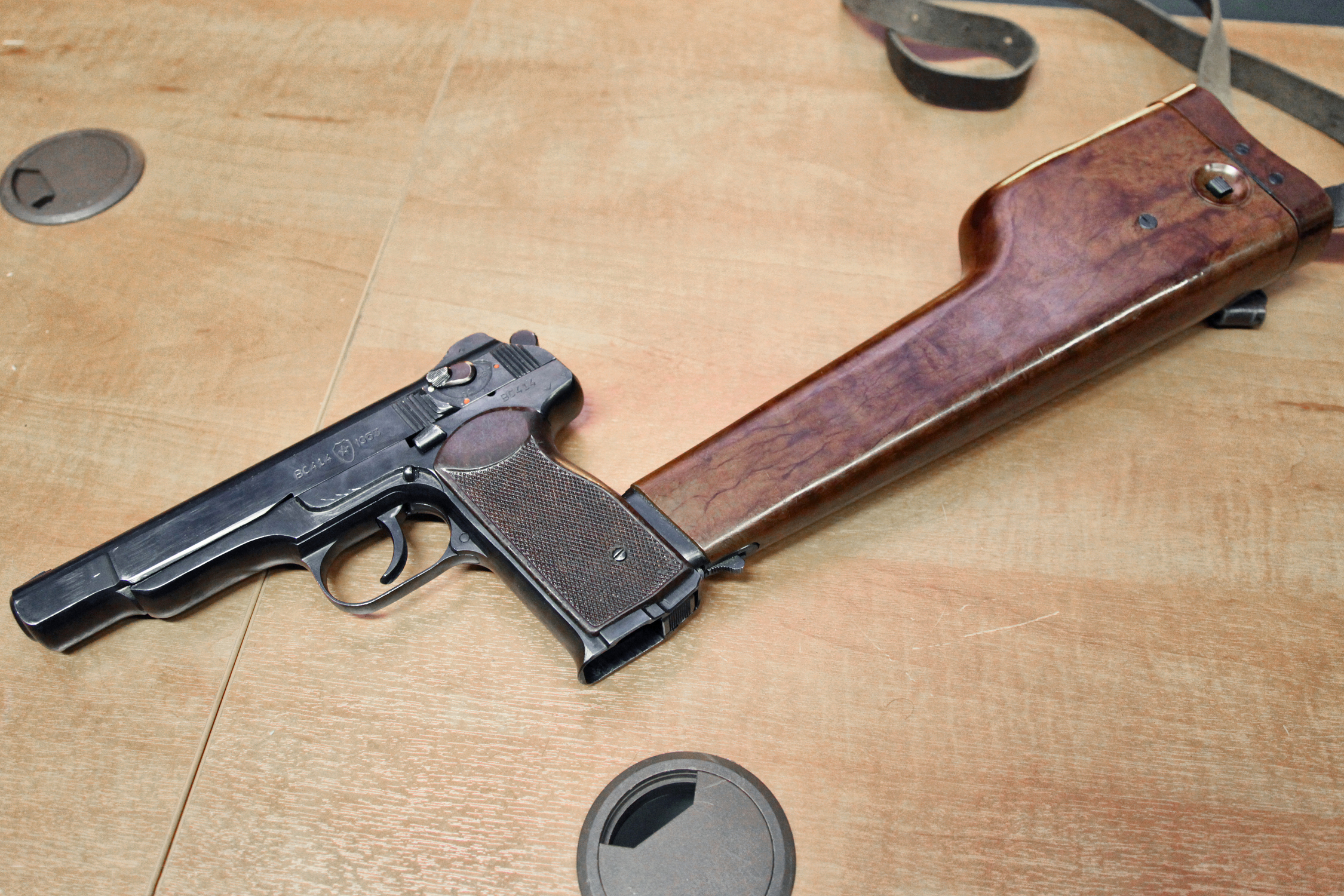
- Stechkin machine pistol with a removable stock attached
- Type: Machine pistol
- Place of origin: Soviet Union

Service history
- In service: 1951–present
- Used by: See Users
- Wars: Vietnam War; Shaba II; Rhodesian Bush War; Soviet–Afghan War; Afghan Civil War (1989-1992); Tuareg rebellion (1990–1995); Chechen-Russian conflict War in Afghanistan (2001–2021); South Ossetia War; Russo-Ukrainian War; Syrian Civil War

Production history
- Designer: Igor Stechkin
- Designed: 1948
- Manufacturer: Vytatsky Polyany Machine-Building Plant
- Produced: 1951–1958 (APS); 1972–1973 (APB)
- Variants: APB silent variant

Specifications
- Mass: 1.22 kg (2.69 lbs)
- Length: 225 mm (8.86 in)
- Barrel length: 140 mm (5.51 in)
- Cartridge: 9×18mm Makarov
- Action: Blowback
- Rate of fire: 750 rounds/minute
- Muzzle velocity: 340 m/s (1,100 ft/s)
- Effective firing range: 50 m (55 yd)
- Maximum firing range: 200 m (220 yd)
- Feed system: 20-round detachable box magazine

The Stechkin Automatic Pistol (Russian: Автоматический Пистолет Стечкина (АПС), romanized: Avtomaticheskiy Pistolet Stechkina (APS)) is a selective fire machine pistol manufacturered by Russian company Vytatsky Polyany Machine-Building Plant. It is chambered in 9×18mm Makarov and 9×19mm Parabellum. The APS was designed by Igor Stechkin for use by artillery and mortar crews, tank crews and aircraft personnel, for whom a cumbersome assault rifle was deemed unnecessary.

The APS was introduced into service with the Soviet Armed Forces in 1951 and has been used in various wars including the Vietnam War, Russo-Ukrainian War and Syrian Civil War. It was praised for its innovative concept and good controllability for its size, but a high cost per unit, complex and time-consuming machining, a limited effective range, large size and weight for a pistol, and a fragile buttstock have been mentioned as a reason to phase it out of active service in favour of carbines such as the AKS-74U.

== Adoption and service ==
In the Soviet Union during the late 1940s, submachine guns such as the PPSh-41 and PPS-43 were declared obsolete shortly after the adoption of the AK-47. A new self-defence weapon was requested for artillery and mortar crews, tank crews, and aircraft personnel, for whom a cumbersome assault rifle was deemed unnecessary.

Igor Stechkin, a recent graduate from the Tula Mechanical Institute, began working on a new automatic firearm to compete against other prolific designers such as Mikhail Kalashnikov. Stechkin designed a select-fire pistol capable of accurate fire up to 200 m (220 yd), with the possibility of attaching a combination holster/shoulder stock. Field-testing of the first prototypes was undertaken from April to June 1949. A 20,000 round endurance test against an Astra machine pistol and a PPS-43 submachine gun proved that Stechkin's design was promising. However, the testing board showed flaws of the prototype, such as the lack of adjustability of the rear sight, the high weight (1.9 kg (4.2 lb) with a holster), short sight radius, and the recoil spring located under the barrel. Stechkin undertook a large redesign effort, using several innovations from the Makarov pistol, such as the general silhouette, slide rails, and extractor. The gun was lightened, the trigger mechanism was redesigned and simplified, and the trigger guard reshaped. After successful military tests, the APS was formally adopted on 3 December 1951.

The APS was issued to Soviet Army vehicle operators, artillery crews, front-line officers, and law enforcement. It was used in conflicts in Angola, Libya, Mozambique, Romania, Tanzania and Zambia. The APS was praised for its innovative concept and good controllability for an automatic weapon of its size, but the cost of each weapon was high and production involved a complex and time-consuming process of machining. Disadvantages in the field proved to be its large size and weight for a pistol, its limited effective range, fragility of the buttstock, frequent malfunctions and subpar ergonomics. The APS was gradually phased out of active service in the Soviet Armed Forces before being officially replaced by the AKS-74U compact assault rifle in 1981, which offered more firepower due to its much more powerful 5.45×39mm M74 rifle ammunition, acceptable accuracy at moderate distances, and greater magazine capacity. However, the APS found a new niche among special forces units of the Spetsnaz and FSB, who needed a more effective sidearm than the standard Makarov PM, and has continued to be used in active service since.

The OTS-33 Pernach, a machine pistol produced by KBP Instrument Design Bureau and co-designed by Stechkin, was introduced as a successor to the APS in 1996. It is also chambered for the 9×18mm Makarov cartridge, but features a simplified design intended to resolve the flaws of the APS.

== Design details ==
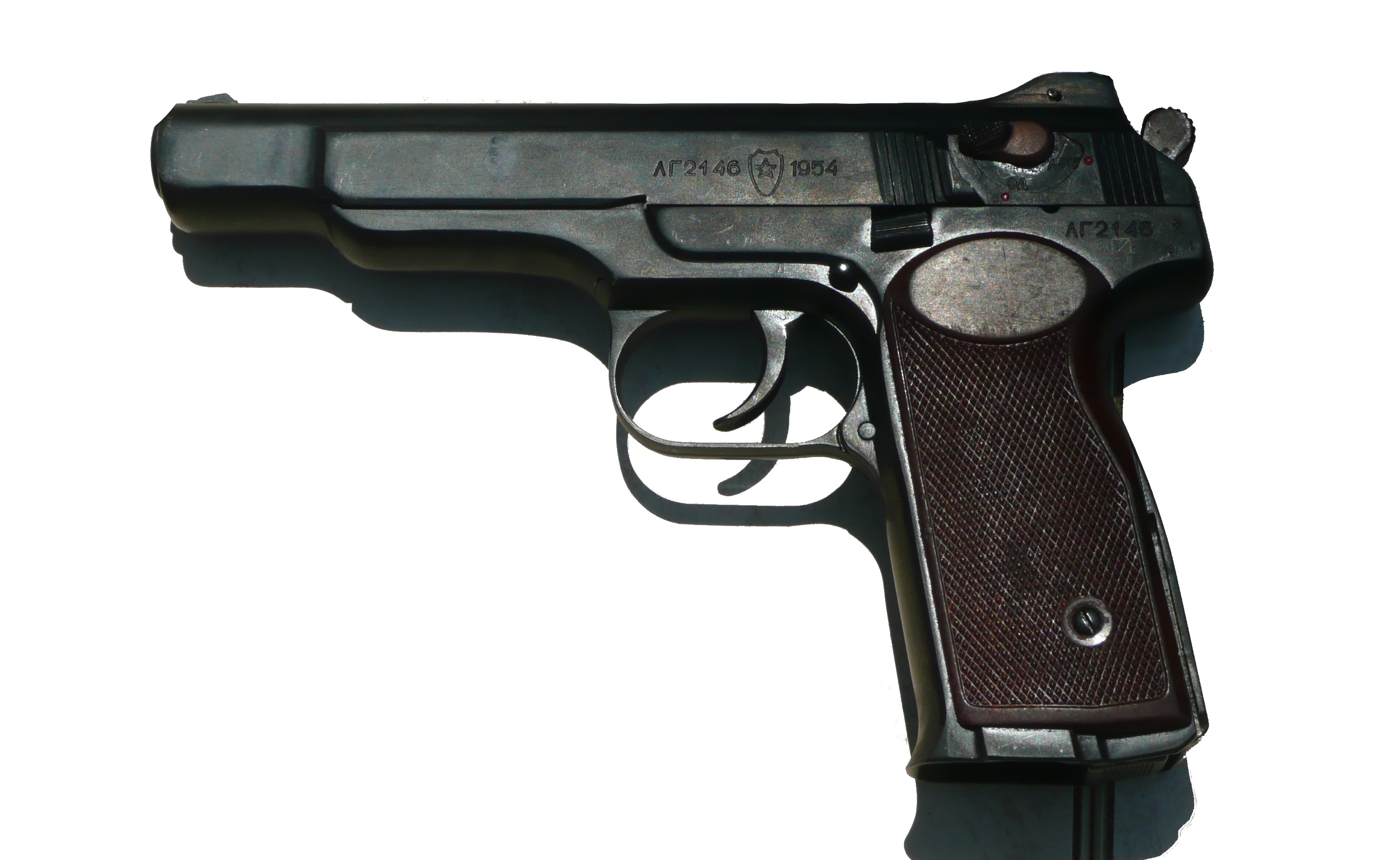
Left side of APS. Note the fire selector set on safe.

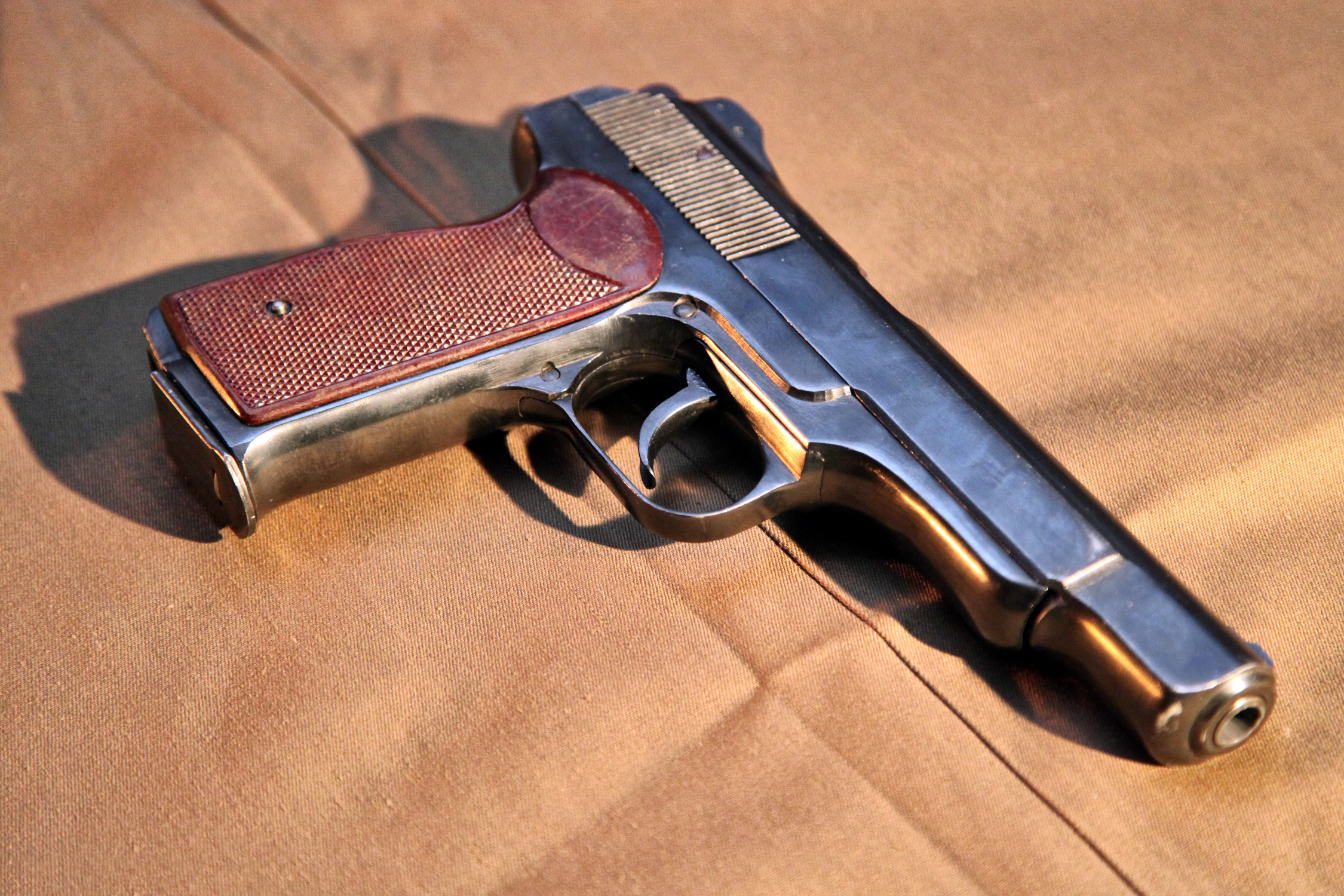
Right side of APS.

The APS is a straight-blowback, select-fire, magazine-fed machine pistol. The weapon is fed through 20-round double-column, two position feed magazine steel box magazines. The APS shares features with the Makarov pistol, such as a heel-mounted magazine release, slide-mounted safety lever, and field-strip procedure. The rear sight is adjustable from 25 m (27 yd), 50 m (55 yd), 100 m (110 yd), and 200 m (220 yd) through an eccentric rotating drum-dial. The serrated front sight may be drifted for windage. The slide features a textured strip on top to reduce aim-disturbing glare. The chrome-lined barrel serves as the recoil spring guide. The slide stop lever also acts as an ejector blade. The trigger guard pivots down for stripping and detents in position through a spring-loaded plunger. The checkered or serrated grips' panels are made from wood (early models), but this was replaced by reddish-brown bakelite or black plastic.

The APS features a combination safety-decocker-fire selector lever on the slide. The three-position lever, when pointed forward in the "PR" or safe position, decocks and locks the hammer, locks the slide to the frame and prevents forward travel of the free-floating firing pin. When pointed downwards to the "OD", or single-shot position, the safety lever deactivates the auto-sear and rate reducer to allow semi-automatic fire. Finally, the rearmost "AVT" position puts the APS in fully automatic mode.

The trigger mechanism of the APS is of a simple construction and features a double/single-action fire mode. It comprises a trigger and trigger bar, disconnector, sear and hammer. The rebounding hammer, when in resting state, has an intermediate safety intercept notch that does not allow forward travel of the hammer unless the sear is raised. Disconnection is achieved through a cam in the slide.

To make controllable automatic fire possible through such a system, Stechkin employed several mechanical solutions. Firstly, the slide has a very long stroke (three times the length of the cartridge). This allows time to slow the slide down and reduce felt recoil by minimising the jolt produced through the collision of the slide with the frame. Secondly, the rate-reducer lever offers extra resistance to the opening stroke of the slide, further slowing down the cycling process. Finally, the primary inertial rate reducing plunger delays the dropping of the hammer after the slide closes. The slide has a large cam that strikes a lever downwards. This lever transfers that energy to a spring-loaded weight located in the grip. The weight travels down, compressing its spring, then slams back up into the trigger bar, tripping the sear and firing the gun. Effectively, the rate reducer, which reduced the automatic rate of fire from 1,000 to 750 RPM, also acts as the auto-sear.

The machine pistol may be fitted with a wooden (early), brown bakelite or steel wire shoulder stock (for the APB variant); otherwise, the weapon becomes difficult to control on full-auto. The stock is attached via a T-slot cut into the rear strap of the pistol frame. The stock is hollowed out and can act as a holster, accepting the machine pistol inside, similar to the Mauser C96 pistol. A leather sling and ammunition pouch were also supplied with the weapon.

== APB ==
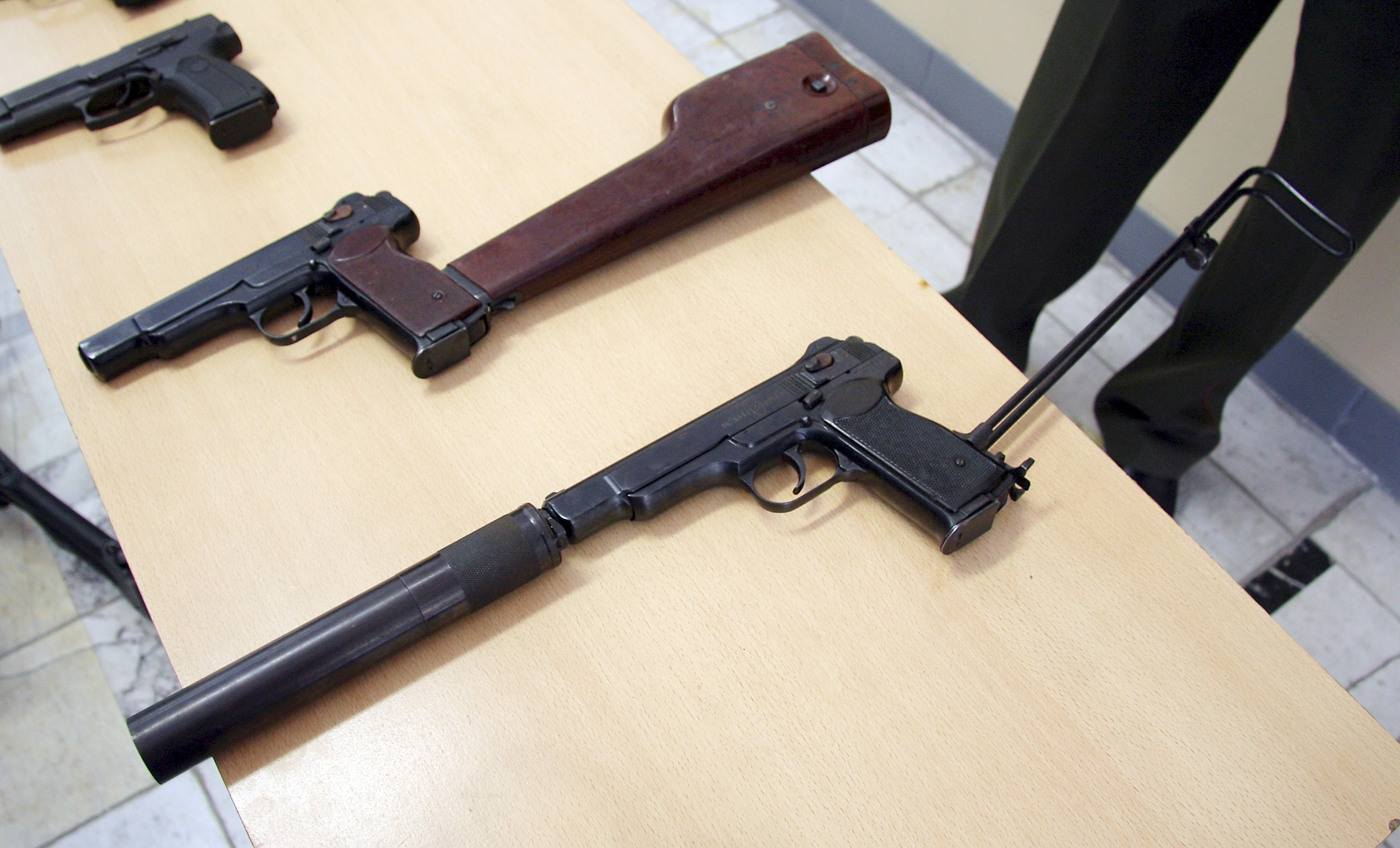
The Stechkin APS and suppressed APB select-fire machine pistols.

The APB (Avtomaticheskiy Pistolet Besshumniy, meaning "Automatic Silenced Pistol") version was a version of the APS optimized for covert operations. Developed in the early 1970s by A.S. Neugodov (А.С. Неугодов) under the factory name AO-44, it was officially adopted in 1972 under the service name APB and given GRAU index 6P13. Approximately 2,000 APS pistols were converted to APB variants by the Vyatskie Polyansky Machine-Building Plant from 1972 to 1973. Muzzle velocity reportedly dropped to 290 m/s (950 ft/s)in this variant. Instead of the holster-stock of the APS, the APB comes with a detachable stock made of steel wire. Its barrel is longer than that of the APS; it protrudes from the slide and is threaded for the attachment of an eccentric sound suppressor. When not in use, the detachable sound suppressor can be clipped to the stock.

During the Soviet–Afghan War, the APB was used by Soviet Spetsnaz team leaders as an extra weapon; they usually carried on a sling with the suppressor and stock mounted. It was used by radio operators and even by some heavy gun crews. Special forces units of the Russian Ministry of Internal Affairs such as the OMON and the SOBR have also used the pistol.

== Traumatic and pneumatic copies and replicas of APS ==
- VPO-504 "APS-M" – traumatic pistol chambered for 10×22mm T (manufactured by Vyatsko-Polyansky Molot Plant by converting combat APS pistols).
- MP-355 – traumatic pistol chambered for 9mm P.A.
- Umarex APS – 4.5mm pneumatic pistol.
- Gletcher APS – 4.5mm pneumatic pistol, identical in weight, with a moving slide.
- Gletcher APS-A – 6mm pneumatic pistol, identical in weight, with a moving slide for use in airsoft games.
- MA-APS – carbines chambered for 9×18mm.
- VFC APS – 6mm pneumatic pistol, identical in weight, with a moving slide for use in airsoft games. Production is expected to begin in late 2024.

== Users ==
=== Current ===
- Azerbaijan
- Angola
- Belarus − In service with OMON, SOBR, special forces and customs authorities.
- Cuba
- Georgia
- Kazakhstan − State Courier Service
- Libya
- Mozambique
- Romania − Manufactured variant known as Dracula md. 98
- Russia − Used by Russian Armed Forces pilots, FSB Alpha Group, interior security forces, and security guards of the Central Bank of The Russian Federation
- Ukraine − Used by special forces
- Tanzania
- Zambia

=== Former ===
- East Germany
- Soviet Union — Used by Spetsnaz

=== Non-state ===
- Afghan mujahideen — captured pistols during the Soviet–Afghan War
- Republic of Artsakh
- People's Movement for the Liberation of Azawad
- Russian separatist forces in Ukraine

== See also ==
- List of modern Russian small arms and light weapons
- PB (pistol)
- Škorpion
- FB PM-63
