= Pistol Md. 1998 =

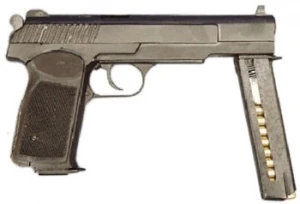
- Type: Machine pistol
- Place of origin: Romania

Service history
- In service: 2003–present

Production history
- Manufacturer: Uzina Mecanică Sadu
- Produced: 1998–present

Specifications
- Mass: 1.2 kilograms (42 oz)
- Length: 250 millimetres (9.8 in)
- Barrel length: 163 millimetres (6.4 in)
- Cartridge: 9×19mm Parabellum
- Action: retarded bolt recoil, free bolt recoil
- Rate of fire: 600-700 RPM
- Muzzle velocity: 385 metres per second (1,260 ft/s)
- Effective firing range: 50 metres (160 ft)
- Maximum firing range: 200 metres (660 ft)
- Feed system: Magazine, 20 rounds
- Sights: mechanical, adjustable rear sight

Pistolul model 1998, also known as Dracula, is a machine pistol designed and manufactured by Uzina Mecanică Sadu of Romania.

== History ==
It was designed in 1998 and since 2003 this weapon has been used by Brigada Antitero București (Bucharest Anti-terrorist Brigade) of the Romanian Intelligence Service.

== Design ==
The pistol construction and operation is based on the Stechkin APS automatic pistol. However instead of a shoulder stock, Pistolul Md. 1998 has a rail under the muzzle which allows a spare magazine to be attached as a forward grip.

The barrel is rifled, with four polygonal grooves. The pistol can be fitted with a sound suppressor and the manufacturer supplies subsonic 9mm Parabellum cartridges for use with the suppressor.

The pistol is equipped with a mechanical rear sight, with an adjustable drum for distances of 25, 50, 100 and 200 meters.

Optionally, the pistol can be fitted with a target marker (laser micro collimator) or a high powered lamp (intense light spot collimator).

== Users ==
- Romania
  - Romanian Intelligence Service
