= Rate reducer =

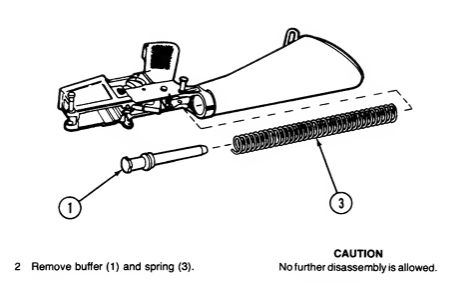
A drawing showing the rate-reducing weighted buffer (labelled "1") of the M-16 assault rifle

The rate reducer (also known as hammer retarder) is a component of the automatic firearm that adjusts the cyclic rate of the weapon by, for example, delaying the hammer fall.

The retardation of the fall serves two purposes:

- delaying the shot until the bolt is fully locked;
- decreasing the speed of firing to improve the firing precision.

== Early 20th century ==
French designers were among the first to implement adjustable rate-reducing systems (in machine guns). The 1905 Puteaux machine gun featured a mechanism that allowed the operator to vary the cyclic rate of fire between 8 and 650 rounds per minute. This concept was further refined in the St. Étienne Mle 1907, which utilized a complex hydraulic rate reducer. Unlike the mechanical inertia-based hammer retarders of later assault rifles, the St. Étienne's system used a hydraulic piston to delay the action, allowing for a variable rate of fire from as low as 8 rounds per minute up to 600 rounds per minute. The weapon's rate of fire was also controlled by an adjustable gas regulator featuring gas ports of varying diameters. This mechanism allowed the operator to alter the cyclic rate by changing the volume of propellant gas admitted into the gas expansion chamber. In practice, the smaller gas ports were prone to fouling with carbon deposits during sustained fire, and crews were generally forced to rely on the largest aperture setting.

== AKM ==
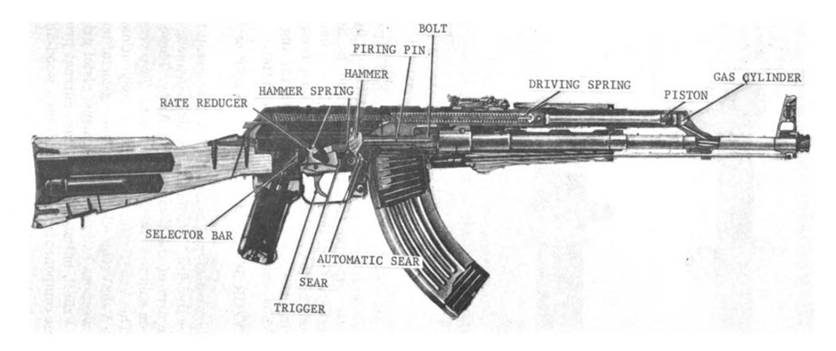
Location of rate reducer on a diagram of AKM

Use of a cyclic rate reducer is the main difference in the operation of AKM when compared to AK-47 (the latter does not have the component). The hammer retarder of AKM is located alongside the trigger and the semiautomatic sear and replaces one of the twin lugs on the trigger. The cyclic rate reducer functions by momentarily holding the hammer in the cocked position after the automatic sear has disengaged. The hammer has to overcome the inertia of the heavy rate reducer before it is released; this causes a slight delay, with a resultant decrease in the automatic rate of fire.

== M-16 platform ==
The cyclic rate of a M-16 rifle is controlled by a weighted element pushed against a return spring known as a buffer. Adjusting the cyclic rate of the M-16 can be achieved by swapping the existing buffer out for alternatively-weighted or shaped buffers that move against the spring at differing speeds as a result. Such adjustment of the cyclic rate of an M-16 may be necessitated by, for example, the change in cyclic rate created when a suppressor is added to the rifle. Such buffers may also reduce the recoil felt by the user.

== Examples ==
- FN BAR
- FB PM-63
- Bushman/Parker-Hale PDW
- Star Si 35

== See also ==
- Select fire
- Glossary of firearms terms

== Sources ==
- "Rule book for 7.62 mm rifles and light machine guns" [Pravilo pušaka i puškomitraljeza 7,62 mm] (PDF). thekalashconnection.com. Department of the Army. 2005 [1983].
- Ballou, James (1 August 2000). "The Mouse: Rate Reducers and Trigger Housings for the BAR". Small Arms Review.
- Johnson, Harold E. (1970). Small Arms Identification and Operation Guide--Eurasian Communist Countries. U.S. Army Foreign Science and Technology Center.
- McLoughlin, Chris (1 March 1999). "Advanced Armament Corporation's M16 Cyclic Rate Reducer". Small Arms Review.
- Erenfeicht, Leszek (13 February 2013). "PM-63: Poland's First PDW". Forgotten Weapons.
- "Gun Review: PM-63 RAK Machine Gun". The Truth About Guns.
- "Star Firearms — Sub-machine guns". Star-Firearms.com.
- McCollum, Ian (19 October 2017). "The St Etienne Mle 1907: France's Domestic Heavy Machine Gun". Forgotten Weapons.
- Segel, Robert (1 August 2003). "Emmageeman's Corner: August 2003". Small Arms Review.
