= PSM pistol =

PSM
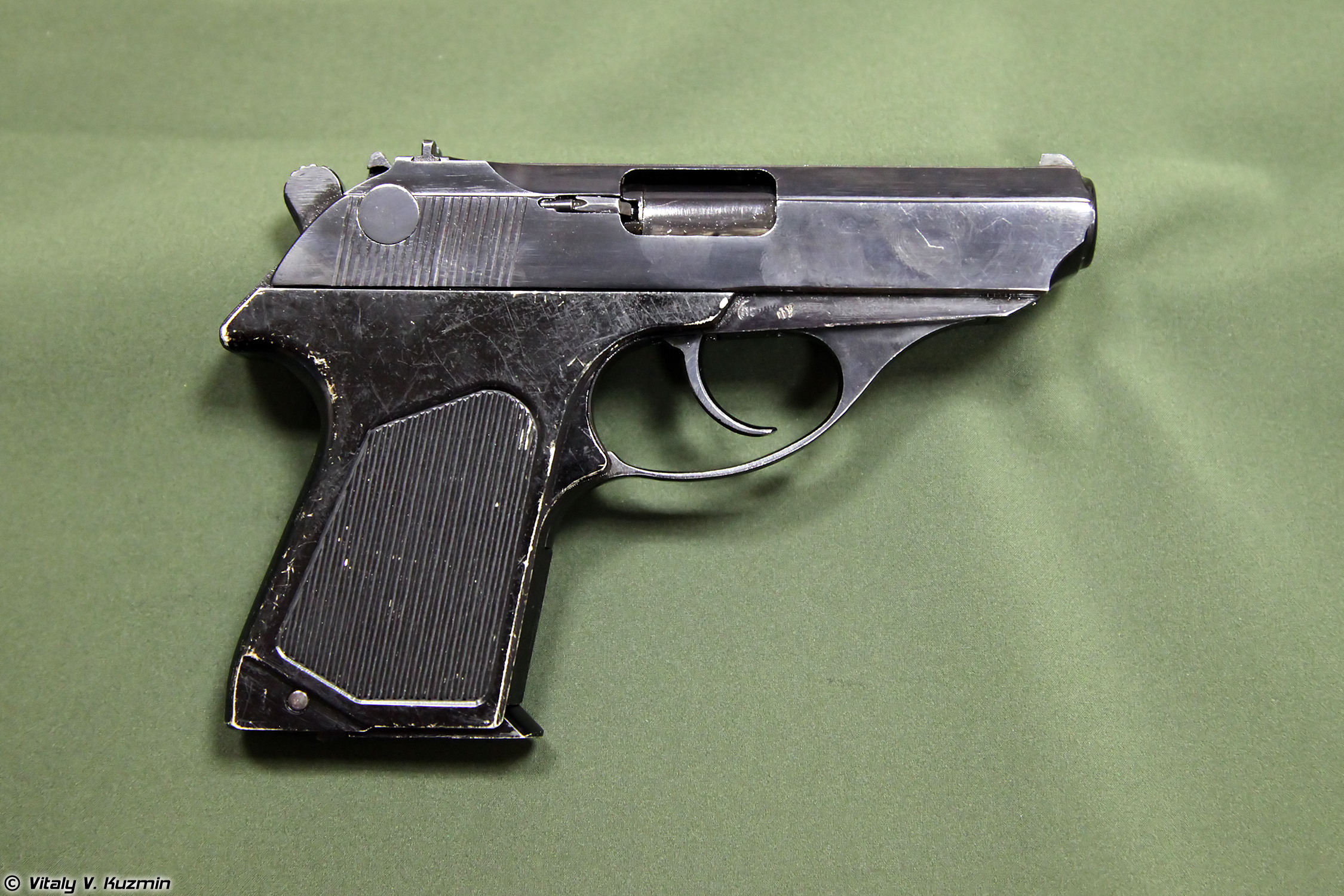
- Type: Semi-automatic pistol
- Place of origin: Soviet Union

Service history
- In service: 1973–present
- Used by: See Users

Production history
- Designed: 1969
- Produced: 1973–Present
- Variants: IZh-75, Baikal-441

Specifications
- Mass: 460 g (16 oz)
- Length: 155 mm (6.1 in)
- Barrel length: 84.6 mm (3.3 in)
- Height: 117 mm (4.6 in)
- Cartridge: 5.45×18mm
- Action: Blowback
- Muzzle velocity: 315 m/s (1,033 ft/s)
- Effective firing range: Sights fixed for 25 m (27 yd)
- Feed system: 8-round detachable box magazine
- Sights: Rear notch and front post

The PSM (Pistolet Samozaryadny Malogabaritny, Russian for "Small self-loading pistol") was designed by the Tula Design Bureau in 1969 as a self-defense firearm for law enforcement and military officers of the USSR. The pistol entered production at the Izhevsk Mechanical Plant in 1973.

The pistol was primarily intended for army high command staff. However, owing to its insignificant dimensions, especially its small width (21 mm (0.83 in) across the safety catch), it soon became popular with security (KGB) and law enforcement (militsiya) personnel. The PSM was also appreciated by higher echelon Communist Party functionaries.

== History ==
The PSM was designed from 1969 until it was completed in 1973.

== Design ==
The PSM is a blowback-operated handgun with a double-action trigger and slide-mounted manual safety without a slide stop. The grip panels are made from thin aluminum and new model with hard plastic. The weapon is made from steel.

The pistol as designed around the newly developed 5.45×18mm cartridge, which was developed for the weapon by Precision Mechanical Engineering Central Research Institute. The cartridge is capable of penetrating 55 layers of Kevlar at realistic engagement distances. However, this is purely a consequence of its hard metal core and the bullet was not designed to defeat body armor. This cartridge has a bottlenecked case and a spitzer-pointed jacketed bullet.

== Other designations ==
- MPTs (Malokalibernyj Pistolet Tsentralnogo-boya; "Small-caliber Pistol, Center-fire")

== Variants ==
- IZh-75 (ИЖ-75)
- IZh-78 (ИЖ-78) - 7.6mm gas pistol
- IZh-78-9T (ИЖ-78-9Т) - 9mm non-lethal pistol (9mm P.A.K.)

== Users ==
- Armenia
- Azerbaijan
- Belarus - custom service
- Bulgaria
- Georgia
- Kazakhstan - police
- Kyrgyzstan
- Latvia
- Moldova
- Mongolia
- Russia
- Tajikistan
- Turkmenistan
- Ukraine
- Uzbekistan
