= Pro Optica Anubis =

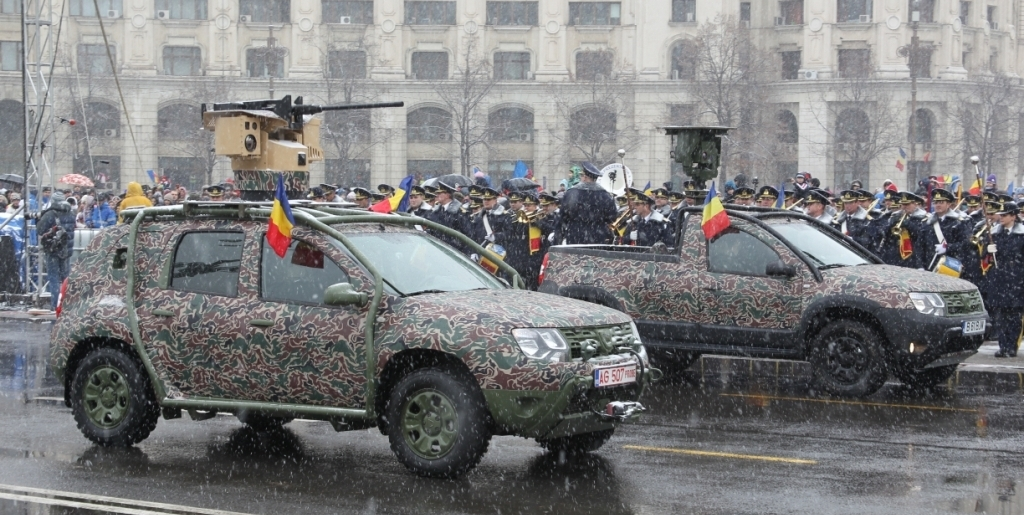
- Dacia Duster military equipped with the Anubis RCWS (on the left)
- Type: Remote controlled weapon station
- Place of origin: Romania

Service history
- In service: 2017-present
- Used by: Romanian Naval Forces; Egyptian Army; Ukrainian Ground Forces
- Wars: Russian invasion of Ukraine

Production history
- Designer: Pro Optica
- Designed: 2010s
- Manufacturer: Pro Optica
- Produced: 2014-present

Specifications
- Shell: 7.62×51mm or 12.7×99mm 40 mm grenades (optional)
- Caliber: 7.62 mm or 12.7 mm
- Traverse: 360°
- Effective firing range: 1,500 m (4,900 ft)
- Sights: thermal imager, CCD camera

The Anubis is a Romanian remote controlled weapon station (RCWS) designed and manufactured by the Pro Optica company. It can use either a 7.62×51mm or a 12.7×99mm machine gun, and can also mount 40 mm grenade launchers. Optionally, the turret can be equipped with level 2 STANAG 4569 ballistic protection.

== History ==
The Anubis RCWS, named in reference to the ancient Egyptian god Anubis, was first seen at the National Military Parade in 2014, where it was mounted on a Dacia Duster military model. In 2018, it was presented at the Black Sea Defense & Aerospace exposition.

A first contract was signed in 2017 when it was announced that the Romanian Navy purchased 4 turrets equipped with 12.7 mm machine guns. The systems were to be added on the frigates, in order to provide anti-piracy capabilities. In 2021, at the Egypt Defence Expo, it was announced that Egypt acquired a new lot of Anubis systems. Pro Optica previously delivered a number of Anubis turrets equipped with 12.7 mm machine guns to the Egyptian Army. The systems are used by the Egyptian 4x4 light armored vehicles.

Pro Optica had also sold 100 Anubis turrets to the Turkish company Nurol for equipping their vehicles offered to the Turkish Gendarmerie. These turrets however failed testing and were instead resold at a discount to some African countries for mounting on 4x4 vehicles.

In 2023, several BMC Kirpi MRAPs with Anubis RCWS systems were spotted in Ukraine. These vehicles were part of a delivery of over 40 Kirpi MRAPS in support of Ukraine in the Russo-Ukrainian War.

== Design ==
The Anubis is gyrostabilized on two axes, and is equipped with a thermal imager, a CCD camera, an automatic fire control system, as well as an easy-safe laser range finder. Detection ranges during night can go up to 6 km for a vehicle and 3 km for a human being, these distances are reduced to one-third for identification. The turret is electrically controlled, but can also be controlled manually as a backup.

=== Anubis 3.0 ===
Development on a new variant of the Anubis, called the Anubis 3.0, began in 2022 and initial production started in 2024. In 2025, Pro Optica began collaboration with the Curtiss-Wright company for the supply of turret drive stabilization systems. The 3.0 variant is to equip Otokar Cobra II vehicles of the Romanian Army.
