= 5.45×18mm =

Soviet pistol cartridge

5.45×18mm MPTs (7N7)
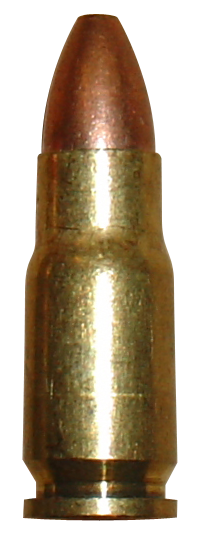
- Type: Pistol
- Place of origin: Soviet Union

Service history
- In service: 1973–present
- Used by: Russian military Russian police KGB

Production history
- Designer: A.D. Denisova; A.I. Bochin; L.S. Nikolayeva; G.P. Shamina
- Designed: 1969–1970
- Manufacturer: Tula Arsenal
- Produced: 1973–present

Specifications
- Case type: Rimless, bottleneck
- Bullet diameter: 5.63 mm (0.222 in)
- Neck diameter: 6.26 mm (0.246 in)
- Shoulder diameter: 7.4 mm (0.29 in)
- Base diameter: 7.64 mm (0.301 in)
- Rim diameter: 7.64 mm (0.301 in)
- Rim thickness: 1.13 mm (0.044 in)
- Case length: 18.03 mm (0.710 in)
- Overall length: 25.00 mm (0.984 in)
- Rifling twist: 270 mm (1 in 10.63 in)
- Primer type: Berdan or Boxer small pistol
- Maximum pressure: 175.00 MPa (25,382 psi)

Ballistic performance
Bullet mass/type	Velocity	Energy
3 g (46 gr) FMJ	320 m/s (1,000 ft/s)	128 J (94 ft⋅lbf)
- Test barrel length: 84 mm Source(s): C.I.P.

5.45×18mm MPTs (7N7) is a Soviet pistol cartridge. It is chambered in the PSM pistol, OTs-23 Drotik machine pistol, and OTs-26 pistol.

== History and design ==
It was designed in the Soviet Union in the early 1970s by Antonina D. Denisova at the Precision Mechanical Engineering Central Research Institute (TsNIITochmash). The development was done in concert with that of the PSM.

The cartridge is designed to use light spitzer-pointed jacketed bullets.

== Variants ==
- 5.45×18mm 7N7 (7Н7): spitzer-pointed full metal jacket bullet with steel conical core. The bullet energy is stated to be up to 1.5 times that of .25 ACP in a similar sized cartridge. It is stated to be capable of penetrating 45 layers of Kevlar soft body armor at close distances.
- 5.45×18mm PSO (ПСО): spitzer-pointed full metal jacket bullet with lead core.
- 5.45×18mm 7H8 (холостой патрон 7Х8): blank cartridge
