= List of submachine guns =

This is a list of submachine guns.

It includes Submachine guns (SMG), Machine pistols (MP), Personal defense weapon systems (PDW), and "compact submachine gun-like weapons" not easily categorized. Weapons may fit in more than one category.

Name	Manufacturer	Image	Cartridge	Country	Produced	Serial production	Type
AAI SMG	AAI Corporation		18.5mm	United States			SMG
Agram 2000	Agram		9×19mm Parabellum	Croatia	1990-Present		SMG
AL-43	Valtion Kivääritehdas (VKT)		9x41mm Lahti	Finland	1943		SMG
American-180	Illinois Arms Company		.22 long rifle.22 Short Magnum	United States	1960s		SMG
Amogh carbine	Ordnance Factory Board		5.56×30mm MINSAS	India	2008-present	Yes	PDW
AR-57	AR57 LLC		FN 5.7×28mm	United States	2008	Yes	PDW
ARES FMG	ARES Incorporated		9×19mm Parabellum	United States	1984		SMG
Armaguerra OG-43	Società Anonima Revelli Manifattura Armiguerra		9×19mm Parabellum	Italy	1943		SMG
Arsenal Shipka	Arsenal AD		9×18mm Makarov; 9×19mm Parabellum	Bulgaria	1996		SMG
Arsenal submachine gun	E-Arsenal		9×20 mm SR Browning	Estonia	1926		SMG
ASALT 96	Uzina Mecanică Sadu		9×19mm Parabellum	Romania	1996		SMG
ASMI	Lokesh Machines Limited		9×19mm Parabellum	India	2021-present		SMG
AUG 9mm	Steyr Arms		9×19mm Parabellum.40 S&W	Austria	1988		SMG
Austen submachine gun	Diecasters; W. T. Carmichael		9×19mm Parabellum	Australia	1942		SMG
Bechowiec-1	Bataliony Chłopskie		9×19mm Parabellum	Poland	1943		SMG
Benelli CB M2	Benelli Armi		9×25mm AUPO	Italy	1980s		SMG
Beretta 93R	Fabbrica d'Armi Pietro Beretta		9×19mm Parabellum	Italy	1979-1993	Yes	MP
Beretta M12	Fabbrica d'Armi Pietro Beretta		9×19mm Parabellum	Italy	1959		SMG
Beretta M1918	Fabbrica d'Armi Pietro Beretta		9mm Glisenti; 9×19mm Parabellum	Italy	1918	Yes	SMG
Beretta Model 38	Fabbrica d'Armi Pietro Beretta		9×19mm Parabellum	Italy	1938		SMG
Beretta Mx4 Storm	Fabbrica d'Armi Pietro Beretta		9×19mm Parabellum.45 ACP	Italy	2003-Present	Yes	SMG
Beretta PMX	Beretta Defense Technologies		9×19mm Parabellum	Italy	2018-present		SMG
Bérgom Esqueleto	Bérgom S/A		9×19mm Parabellum	Brazil	1973	No	SMG
Błyskawica	Wacław Zawrotny		9×19mm Parabellum	Poland	1943		SMG
Borz	Krasniy Molot, Grozny		9×18mm Makarov	Chechnya	1992		SMG
Brügger & Thomet APC	B&T		9×19mm Parabellum.40 S&W; 10mm Auto.45 ACP	Switzerland	2011-Present	Yes	SMG
Brügger & Thomet MP9	B&T		9×19mm Parabellum	Switzerland	2001-Present	Yes	SMG
BSA experimental model 1949	Birmingham Small Arms		9×19mm Parabellum	United Kingdom	1949		SMG
BSA Welgun	Birmingham Small Arms		9×19mm Parabellum	United Kingdom	1942-1943 (trials only)	No	SMG
Calico M960A	Calico Light Weapons Systems		9×19mm Parabellum	United States	1990-present		SMG
Carbon 15	Bushmaster Firearms International		9×19mm Parabellum	United States	2003		SMG
Carl Gustav m/45	Carl Gustafs Stads Gevärsfaktori		9×19mm Parabellum	Sweden	1945-1964		SMG
Carlo (submachine gun)	Small metal working shops		Variable	Palestine	2000		SMG
CAVIM Caribe	Compañía Anónima Venezolana de Industrias Militares		9×19mm Parabellum	Venezuela	2019		SMG; Bullpup
CETME C2 submachine gun	CETME		9×23mm Largo; 9x19mm Parabellum	Spain	1964		SMG
Chauchat-Ribeyrolles 1918 submachine gun	Ribeyrolles, Sutter and Chauchat (RSC)		8×50mmR Lebel	France	1918	No	SMG; PDW
Chropi GP10 submachine gun	Chropi		9×19mm Parabellum.45 ACP	Greece	1975		SMG
Choroszmanów submachine gun	Grzegorz Choroszman		7.62×25mm Tokarev	Poland	1943		SMG
CMMG MkG	CMMG		.45 ACP	United States	2017		SMG
CMP 9	Caracal International		9×19mm Parabellum	United Arab Emirates	2017		SMG
Colt 9mm SMG	Colt's Manufacturing Company		9×19mm Parabellum	United States	1982-Present		SMG
Colt SCAMP	Henry A. Into		.221 Remington Fireball	United States	1971		MP; PDW
CS/LS5	China South Industries Group		9×19mm DAP92-9; 9×19mm Parabellum; 9×21mm IMI	China	2012-present		SMG
CS/LS6	Chongqing Changfeng		9×19mm Parabellum	China	2005-present		SMG
CS/LS7	China South Industries Group		9×19mm DAP92-9; 9×19mm Parabellum	China	2016-present		SMG
CZ 75 Automatic	Česká zbrojovka Uherský Brod		9×19mm Parabellum	Czech Republic	1992-?		MP
CZ Scorpion Evo 3	Česká zbrojovka Uherský Brod		9×19mm Parabellum	Czech Republic	2009-present		SMG
ČZW-438	Česká zbrojovka Uherský Brod		4.38×30mm Libra; 9×19mm Parabellum	Czech Republic	2016		PDW; SMG
Danuvia 43M submachine gun	Danuvia Engineering Industries		9×25mm Mauser	Hungary	1943		SMG
Daewoo Precision Industries K7	S&T Motiv		9×19mm Parabellum	South Korea	2001-Present		SMG
Demro TAC-1	TRI-C Corporation		.45 ACP; 9×19mm Parabellum	United States	1975		
DUX submachine gun	Oviedo Military Arsenal		9×19mm Parabellum	Spain	1953		SMG
EDDA submachine gun	Only one prototype made		.22 Winchester Magnum Rimfire	Argentina	1970s		SMG
Elf	KB-ST		9×18mm Makarov	Ukraine	1990s		SMG
EMP 44	Erma Werke		9×19mm Parabellum	Germany	1944		SMG
Erma EMP	Erma Werke		9×19mm Parabellum; 9×23mm Largo; 7.63×25mm Mauser	Germany	1931		SMG
ETVS submachine gun	Établissement Technique de Versailles		7.65×20mm Longue	France	1933-1939		SMG
Experimental Model 2 submachine gun	Nambu		8×22mm Nambu	Japan	1935		SMG
F1 submachine gun	Lithgow Small Arms Factory		9×19mm Parabellum	Australia	1962-1973		SMG
FAMAE SAF	FAMAE		9×19mm Parabellum.40 S&W	Chile	1993-Present		SMG
FBP submachine gun	Fábrica de Braço de Prata		9×19mm Parabellum	Portugal	1948		SMG
Floro MK-9	Floro International Corporation		9×19mm Parabellum	Philippines	2001		SMG
FMK-3 submachine gun	Military Industries States Corporation		9×19mm Parabellum	Argentina	1974		SMG
FNAB-43	Fabbrica Nazionale d'Armi di Brescia		9×19mm Parabellum	Italy	1943		SMG
FN P90	FN Herstal		FN 5.7×28mm	Belgium	1990-1993 (SS90 cartridge); 1993-Present (SS190 cartridge)		PDW
Fort-230	RPC Fort		9×19mm Parabellum	Ukraine	2021	yes	PDW
Frommer Stop Machine Pistol	Fegyver- és Gépgyár		.380 ACP	Austria-Hungary	1916		MP
Franchi LF-57	Luigi Franchi		9×19mm Parabellum	Italy	1956/1957		SMG
Gepard (submachine gun)	Military Unit 33491; JSC REX		.380 ACP; 9×18mm Makarov; 9×19mm Parabellum; 9×19mm 7N21; 9×21mm 9×21mm Gyurza; 9×30mm Grom	Russia	1995	no	SMG
Gevarm D4	Gevarm		9×19mm Parabellum	France	1956		SMG
Glock 18	Glock Ges.m.b.H.		9×19mm Parabellum	Austria	1986	yes	MP
Grand Power Stribog	Grand Power s.r.o.		6mm Flobert.22 long rifle 7.62×25mm Tokarev.380 ACP; 9×19mm Parabellum; 10mm Auto.45 ACP	Slovakia	2016		SMG
Goblin	KB-ST		9×18mm Makarov; 9×19mm Parabellum	Ukraine	1990s		SMG
Hafdasa C-4	Hispano Argentina de Automotives SA		9×19mm Parabellum.45 ACP	Argentina	1939		SMG
Halcón M-1943	Fábrica de Armas Halcón		9×19mm Parabellum.45 ACP	Argentina	1943		SMG
Halcón ML-57	Buenos Aires Halcon		9×19mm Parabellum.45 ACP	Argentina	1957		SMG
Halcón ML-63	Buenos Aires Halcon		9×19mm Parabellum	Argentina	1963		SMG
HB-1 submachine gun	Herman Baron, Maestranza del Ejército		9x19mm Parabellum	El Salvador	1958		SMG
Heckler & Koch MP5	Heckler & Koch		9×19mm Parabellum; 10mm Auto.40 S&W.22 long rifle	West Germany	1966-present	yes	SMG
Heckler & Koch MP5K	Heckler & Koch		9×19mm Parabellum	West Germany	1976-present	yes	SMG
Heckler & Koch MP7	Heckler & Koch		4.6×30mm	Germany	1999-present	yes	SMG; PDW
Heckler & Koch MP2000	Heckler & Koch		9×19mm Parabellum	Germany	1988-1990		SMG
Heckler & Koch UMP	Heckler & Koch		9×19mm Parabellum.45 ACP.40 S&W	Germany	2000-present		SMG
Heckler & Koch VP70	Heckler & Koch		9×19mm Parabellum	Germany	1970-1989	yes	MP
Hotchkiss Type Universal	Hotchkiss et Cie		9×19mm Parabellum	France	1949		SMG
HS Produkt Kuna	HS Produkt		9×19mm Parabellum.40 S&W	Croatia	2024	Yes	SMG
INA Model 953	Industria National de Armas S.A.		.45 ACP	Brazil	1950		SMG
Ingram Model 6	Ingram Micro		9×19mm Parabellum.38 Super.45 ACP	United States	1949		SMG
Interdynamic MP-9	Interdynamic AB		9×19mm Parabellum	Sweden	1983		SMG
Jatimatic / GG-95 PDW	Tampereen Asepaja Oy		9×19mm Parabellum	Finland	1983-1986, 1995		SMG
Joint Venture Protective Carbine	OFT Trichy		5.56×30mm MINSAS	India	2005/2006-present		SMG
JS 9 mm	China South Industries Group		9×19mm Parabellum	China	2006-present		SMG
K6-92	SPA Garni-Ler		9×18mm Makarov	Armenia	1991		SMG
KAC PDW	Knight's Armament Company		6x35 mm	United States	2006		PDW
KP m/44	Tikkakoski		9×19mm Parabellum	Finland	1944		SMG
KP Vz. 38	Česká zbrojovka Strakonice		.380 ACP	Czechoslovakia	1937-1938 (prototype only)		SMG
KGP-9	Fegyver- és Gépgyár		9×19mm Parabellum	Hungary	1988		SMG
KIS	Jan Piwnik's Ponury guerrilla unit		9×19mm Parabellum	Poland	1943		SMG
KK-MPi 69	VEB Vehicle and Hunting Weapons Factory "Ernst Thälmann" (C.G. Haenel)		.22 long rifle	East Germany	1969		SMG
KRISS Vector	KRISS USA Inc.		9×19mm Parabellum.45 ACP.40 S&W; 9×21mm 10mm Auto.357 SIG.22 LR	United States	2009-Present	yes	SMG
Kucher Model K1	Danuvia		7.62×25mm Tokarev	Hungary	1951-1960s		SMG
La France M16K-45	La France Specialties		.45 ACP	United States	1982		SMG
Labora Fontbernat M-1938	Factory Nº15		9×23mm Largo	Spain	1938		SMG
Lanchester submachine gun	Sterling Armaments Company		9×19mm Parabellum	United Kingdom	1940		SMG
LAD machine gun	NIPSMVO		7.62×25mm Tokarev	Soviet Union	1942	no	Other
Lehnar submachine gun	Juan Lehnar		9×19mm Parabellum	Argentina	1930		SMG
Lercker pistol	Carlo Cuppini and Cesare Lercker		.25 ACP	Italy	1950		MP
Lettet–Forsøgs submachine gun	Dansk Industri Syndikat		9×19mm Parabellum	Denmark	1941		SMG
Lmg-Pist 41/44	Waffenfabrik Bern		7.65×21mm Parabellum	Switzerland	1941		MP
Lusa submachine gun	INDEP		9×19mm Parabellum	Portugal	1983		SMG
M-101C	Morgan Arms		9×19mm Parabellum	United States	1974		SMG
M2 Hyde	Marlin Firearms		.45 ACP	United States	1942		SMG
M3 Grease Gun	General Motors		.45 ACP; 9×19mm Parabellum.30 Carbine	United States	1942-1945, with additional production in early 1950s	yes	SMG
M49 submachine gun	Zastava Arms		7.62×25mm Tokarev	Yugoslavia	1949		SMG
M50 Reising	Harrington & Richardson		.45 ACP	United States	1941	yes	SMG
M56 submachine gun	Zastava Arms		7.62×25mm Tokarev	Yugoslavia	1956		SMG
MAC-10	Military Armament Corporation		.45 ACP; 9×19mm Parabellum	United States	1970-1973		SMG; MP
MAC-11	Military Armament Corporation		.380 ACP	United States	1972-present		SMG; MP
Minebea PM-9	Minebea Co.		9×19mm Parabellum	Japan	1990		SMG
Madsen M-50	Dansk Industri Syndikat		9×19mm Parabellum	Denmark	1950/1953-?		SMG
Madsen M1945	Dansk Industri Syndikat		9×19mm Parabellum	Denmark	1945		SMG
Magpul FMG-9	Magpul Industries		9×19mm Parabellum	United States	2008-?		SMG; Other
MAS-38	Manufacture d'armes de Saint-Étienne		7.65mm Longue	France	1938-1973		SMG
Maschinenpistole M.12 Patrone 16	Œ.W.G.		9×23mm Steyr	Austria	1915	yes	MP
Maschinenpistole Senn	Heinrich Senn of Bern		9×19mm Parabellum; 7.65×21mm Parabellum	Switzerland	1916	no	MP
Maschinenkarabiner 36	Hugo Schmeisser		9×19mm Parabellum	Germany	1936		SMG
MAT-49	Manufacture Nationale d'Armes de Tulle		9×19mm Parabellum; 7.62×25mm Tokarev	France	1949		SMG
Mauser MP-57	Mauser		9×19mm Parabellum	West Germany	1957		SMG
Mauser Schnellfeuer	Mauser		7.63×25mm Mauser 9×19mm Parabellum	Germany	1932		MP
MCEM 2 submachine gun	Royal Small Arms Factory		9×19mm Parabellum	United Kingdom	1944		SMG
MCEM 3 submachine gun	Royal Small Arms Factory		9×19mm Parabellum	United Kingdom	1947		SMG
Mekanika Uru	Mekanika Industria e Commercio		9×19mm Parabellum.38 ACP	Brazil	1977	Yes	SMG
MEMS M-52/60	MEMS		9×19mm Parabellum	Argentina	1950		SMG
Mendoza HM-3	Productos Mendoza		9mm calibre.380 ACP	Mexico	2012		SMG
Métral submachine gun	Gérard Métral		9×19mm Parabellum	Switzerland	1995		SMG
MGD PM-9	Louis Debuit		9×19mm Parabellum	France	1950 (pre-production prototypes only)		SMG
MGP submachine gun	SIMA Electronica		9×19mm Parabellum	Peru	1979		SMG
MGP-15 submachine gun	SIMA Electronica		9×19mm Parabellum	Peru	1990		SMG
MGV-176	Gorenje; Orbis		.22 long rifle	Yugoslavia; Slovenia	1979		SMG
Milkor BXP	Milkor (Pty) Ltd		9×19mm Parabellum	South Africa	1980s		SMG
Moore submachine gun	Kim Ira Moore		.45 ACP	United States	2002		SMG
Mors submachine gun	Państwowa Fabryka Karabinów		9×19mm Parabellum	Poland	1939		SMG
MP 18	Bergmann Waffenfabrik		9×19mm Parabellum	Germany	1918-1920's; 1928-Early 1940s (MP 28/II)	yes	SMG
MP 34	Waffenfabrik Steyr		9×19mm Parabellum; 9×23mm Steyr; 9×25mm Mauser.45 ACP	Austria	1929		SMG
MP35	Bergmann		9×19mm Parabellum	Germany	1935		SMG
MP 36	Erma Werke		9×19mm Parabellum	Germany	1936		SMG
MP 40	Steyr-Mannlicher; Erma Werke; Haenel Company		9×19mm Parabellum	Germany	1940-1945	Yes	SMG
MP 41	Haenel Company		9×19mm Parabellum	Germany	1941		SMG
MP 3008	Ludwig Vorgrimler		9×19mm Parabellum	Germany	1945		SMG
MTR M9 A1	Bérgom S/A		9×19mm Parabellum	Brazil	1970s	No	SMG
New Nambu M66	Shin-Chuō Industries		9×19mm Parabellum	Japan	1966		SMG
Onorati SMG	Umberto Onorati		9×19mm Parabellum	Italy	1936 Prototype only		SMG
Orita M1941	Uzinele Metalurgice Copșa Mică și Cugir		9×19mm Parabellum	Romania	1941		SMG
OTs-22 Buk	TsKIB SOO		9×19mm 7N21	Russia	1990s		SMG
OTs-33 Pernach	KBP Instrument Design Bureau		9×18mm Makarov	Russia	1995/1996-?		MP
OTs-02 Kiparis	KBP Instrument Design Bureau		9×18mm Makarov	Soviet Union	1991-present (design dated 1972)		SMG
OTs-23 Drotik	KBP Instrument Design Bureau		5.45×18mm	Russia	1993		SMG
OVP 1918	Officine di Villar Perosa		9mm Glisenti	Italy	1918	yes	SMG
Owen Gun	Lysaght's Works		9×19mm Parabellum	Australia	1942-1944		SMG
PAM submachine gun	Fabricaciones Militares		9×19mm Parabellum	Argentina	1955-90s		SMG
Parinco mod. 3R	Parinco		9×19mm Parabellum	Spain	1959		SMG
PAWS ZX	Police Automatic Weapons Systems		.30 Carbine.357 (proposed); 9x19mm Parabellum.40 S&W.45 ACP	United States	1980s		SMG
Perrine submachine gun	Tonalea Enterprises Inc.		9×19mm Parabellum.45 ACP	United States	1965		SMG
Pindad PM2	Pindad		9×19mm Parabellum	Indonesia	2006		SMG
Pindad PM3	Pindad		9×19mm Parabellum; 9×21mm Pindad	Indonesia	2016		SMG
Pistol Md. 1998	Uzina Mecanică Sadu		9×19mm Parabellum	Romania	1998		MP
Pistol Mitralieră model 1996 RATMIL	RomArm via Uzinele Mecanice Cugir		9×19mm Parabellum	Romania	1996		SMG
Pistolet maszynowy dywersyjny	Military Institute of Armament Technology		7.63×25mm Mauser	Poland	1939 (concept only)		SMG; MP
PKS-9 Ultralite	Weaver Arms Corporation		9×19mm Parabellum	United States	1980s		SMG
Pleter 91 submachine gun	Oroplet		9×19mm Parabellum	Croatia	1991		SMG
PM-63 RAK	FB "Łucznik" Radom		9×18mm Makarov	Poland	1967-1977		SMG
PM-84	FB "Łucznik" Radom		9×19mm Parabellum	Poland	1984-?		SMG
PM-98	FB "Łucznik" Radom		9×19mm Parabellum	Poland	1998-?		SMG
PM-06	FB "Łucznik" Radom		9×19mm Parabellum	Poland	2006-present		SMG
PP-19 Bizon	Izhmash		9×18mm Makarov; 9×19mm Parabellum.380 ACP; 7.62×25mm Tokarev	Russia	1996-present	Yes	SMG
PP-19-01 Vityaz	Kalashnikov Concern		9×19mm Parabellum; 9×19mm 7N31	Russia	2008-present		SMG
PP-90	KBP Instrument Design Bureau		9×18mm Makarov	Soviet Union	1990-?		SMG; Other
PP-90M1	KBP Instrument Design Bureau		9×19mm Parabellum	Russia	1990s		SMG
PP-91 KEDR	Izhmash		9×18mm Makarov	Soviet Union	1994-present (was designed in 1970s)		SMG
PP-93	KBP Instrument Design Bureau		9×18mm Makarov	Russia	1993-?		SMG
PP-2000	KBP Instrument Design Bureau		9×19mm Parabellum	Russia	2006-present		SMG
PPD-40	Vasily Degtyaryov		7.62×25mm Tokarev	Soviet Union	1940		SMG
PPD-44	Vasily Degtyaryov		7.62×25mm Tokarev	Soviet Union	1944		SMG
PPS submachine gun	I. K. Bezruchko-Vysotsky and A. I. Sudayev		7.62×25mm Tokarev	Soviet Union	1942		SMG
PPSh-41	Georgy Shpagin		7.62×25mm Tokarev	Soviet Union	1941		SMG
QCW-05	China South Industries Group		5.8×21mm DCV05	China	2005-present		PDW
R9-Arms submachine gun	R9-Arms Corp. USA (fake company), true manufacturer unknown		9×19mm Parabellum	Unknown	Unknown-present		SMG
Rexim-Favor	Rexim Small Arms Company		9×19mm Parabellum	Switzerland	1953		SMG
Ruger MP9	Sturm, Ruger & Co.		9×19mm Parabellum	United States	1995-1996		SMG; MP
S&T Daewoo XK9	S&T Motiv		9×19mm Parabellum	South Korea	2003-2004 (preproduction prototypes only)		SMG
SNT Motiv STS-M21	SNT Motiv		9×19mm Parabellum	South Korea	2021		SMG
SACO Model 683	SACO Defense		9×19mm Parabellum	United States	1980		SMG
Sa vz. 23	Česká zbrojovka Uherský Brod		9×19mm Parabellum; 7.62×25mm Tokarev	Czechoslovakia	1948-1968		SMG
Saab Bofors Dynamics CBJ-MS	Saab Bofors Dynamics		9×19mm Parabellum; 6.5×25 CBJ-MS	Sweden	2000s		SMG
Sanna 77			9×19mm Parabellum	Rhodesia; South Africa	1977-1980		SMG
SAR 109T	Sarsilmaz		9×19mm Parabellum	Turkey	2014		SMG
SAR 87	Sterling Armaments Company		9×19mm Parabellum	United Kingdom; Singapore	1987		SMG
Sayer SMG	InterArms UK Limited		9×19mm Parabellum	United Kingdom	1980s	Toolroom prototype only	SMG
Škorpion	Česká Zbrojovka Uherský Brod		.32 ACP	Czechoslovakia	1961-1979 (variants continued by other manufacturers)		SMG; MP
SIG 310	Schweizerische Industrie Gesellschaft		9×19mm Parabellum	Switzerland	1940s-1972		SMG
SIG MKMO	Schweizerische Industrie Gesellschaft		9×19mm Parabellum	Switzerland	1930-1941		SMG
SIG MP41	Schweizerische Industrie Gesellschaft		9×19mm Parabellum	Switzerland	1941		SMG
SIG MPX	SIG Sauer		9×19mm Parabellum	United States	2015-present		SMG
Smith & Wesson Model 76	Smith & Wesson		9×19mm Parabellum	United States	1967-1974		SMG
Socimi Type 821	Societa Costruzioni Industriali Milano; Luigi Franchi S.p.A.		9×19mm Parabellum	Italy	1984-1989		SMG
Sola submachine gun	Societe Luxembourgeoise SA		9×19mm Parabellum	Luxembourg	1952		SMG
Spectre M4	Società Italiana Tecnologie Speciali S.p.A. later GRECO SPORT, S.A.		.45 ACP; 9×19mm Parabellum.40 S&W	Italy	1984-2001		SMG
Speed9	Mimic Firearms		9×19mm Parabellum	United States	2025		SMG
Sputter Gun	York Arms Co.		9×19mm Parabellum	United States	1983		SMG
SR-2 Veresk	TsNIITochMash		9×21mm Gyurza	Russia	1999/2004-?		SMG
Standschütze Hellriegel M1915	A few prototypes made by members of the Austro-Hungarian military		9×23mm Steyr	Austria-Hungary	1915	No	Other
Star Model Z-45	Star Bonifacio Echeverria, S.A.		9x19mm Parabellum; 9×23mm Largo.38 Super.45 ACP	Spain	1945		SMG
Star Model Z62	Star Bonifacio Echeverria, S.A.		9×23mm Largo; 9x19mm Parabellum	Spain	1962-present		SMG
Star Model Z84	Star Bonifacio Echeverria, S.A.		9x19mm Parabellum	Spain	1984-present		SMG
Star Si 35	Star Bonifacio Echeverria, S.A.		9×23mm Largo.38 ACP	Spain	1935		SMG
Stechkin automatic pistol	Tula Arms Plant		9×18mm Makarov	Soviet Union	1951–1958 (APS); 1972–1973 (APB)		MP
Sten	Royal Small Arms Factory; BSA and others		9×19mm Parabellum	United Kingdom	1941-present (depending on version)		SMG
Sterling submachine gun	Sterling Armaments Company; Royal Ordnance Factories		9×19mm Parabellum	United Kingdom	1953-1988		SMG
Steyr MPi 69	Steyr Mannlicher		9×19mm Parabellum	Austria	1969-1990		SMG
Steyr TMP	Steyr Mannlicher		9×19mm Parabellum	Austria	1992-2001		MP
ST Kinetics CPW	ST Kinetics		9×19mm Parabellum; FN 5.7×28mm 4.6×30mm	Singapore	2009-present		PDW; SMG
STK SSW (firearm)	ST Kinetics		FN 5.7×28mm	Singapore	2000s	No	Other
Suomi KP/-31	Tikkakoski (company)		9×19mm Parabellum	Finland	1931-1953		SMG
Tara TM-9	Tara Perfection		9×19mm Parabellum	Montenegro			SMG
Taurus SMT	Taurus Armas		9×19mm Parabellum.40 S&W.45 ACP	Brazil	2011		SMG
Thompson submachine gun	Auto-Ordnance Company		.45 ACP	United States	1921-1945		SMG
Tiger Cub	Small Arms Industries		9×19mm Parabellum	Denmark			SMG
Tokarev Model 1927	Fedor Vasilevich Tokarev		7.62×38mmR Nagant	Soviet Union	1927		SMG
Tokyo Arsenal Model 1927	Tokyo Arsenal		8x22mm Nambu	Japan	1927		SMG
Trejo pistol	Industrias Trejo de Zacatlán S.A. de C.V.		.22 LR.32 ACP.380 ACP	Mexico	1940s		MP
Tuma MTE 224 VA	MARTIN TUMA ENGINEERING, Gmbh		.224 Voboril	Switzerland	2000		MP; PDW
Type 64 submachine gun	China North Industries Corporation		7.62×25mm Type 51	China	1964-?		SMG
Type 77 submachine gun	Hsing Hua Arsenal		9×19mm Parabellum	Taiwan	1985-?		SMG
Type 79 submachine gun	China North Industries Corporation		7.62×25mm Tokarev	China	1981-1995		SMG
Type 80 pistol	Norinco		7.62×25mm Tokarev	China	1980		MP
Type 85 submachine gun	China North Industries Corporation		7.62×25mm Tokarev	China	1980s		SMG
Type 100 submachine gun	Nagoya Arsenal		8×22mm Nambu	Japan	1939		SMG
TZ-45	Fabbrica Fratelli Giandoso		9×19mm Parabellum	Italy	1945		SMG
UC-9	Pearl Manufacturing; David Boatman; M6 Management Company		9×19mm Parabellum	United States	1970s		SMG
United Defense M42	United Defense Supply Corp		9×19mm Parabellum.45 ACP	United States	1942		SMG
United Defense UD-1	United Defense Supply Corp		9×19mm Parabellum.45 ACP	United States	1943		SMG
Uzi Mini Uzi Micro Uzi	Israel Military Industries		9×19mm Parabellum	Israel	1950-present		SMG; MP
Vigneron submachine gun	Georges Vigneron		9×19mm Parabellum	Belgium	1952		SMG
Villar Perosa aircraft submachine gun	Officine di Villar Perosa		9mm Glisenti	Italy	1915		Other
Volkov-Chukhmatov			7.62×25mm Tokarev	Soviet Union	1940s		SMG
Walther MP	Walther arms		9×19mm Parabellum.380 ACP	West Germany	1963-1985		SMG
WG66			7.62×25mm Tokarev	East Germany	1966		SMG
X95 SMG	Israel Weapon Industries		9×19mm Parabellum	Israel	2009		SMG
Yazikov KPPYa			7.62×25mm Tokarev	Soviet Union	1943		SMG
Zagi M-91	Likaweld		9×19mm Parabellum	Croatia	1991		SMG
Zastava Master FLG	Zastava Arms		9×19mm Parabellum	Serbia and Montenegro	1996		SMG
ZB-47	Zbrojovka Brno		9×19mm Parabellum	Czechoslovakia	1947		SMG
ZK-383	Zbrojovka Brno		9×19mm Parabellum	Czechoslovakia	1930		SMG

== See also ==
- List of PDWs
- List of machine pistols
- List of firearms
- List of weapons
- List of bolt-action rifles
- List of carbines
- List of bullpup firearms
- List of machine guns
- List of multiple-barrel firearms
- List of assault rifles
- List of sniper rifles
- List of shotguns
- List of pistols
- List of revolvers
- List of semi-automatic pistols
