= SR-2 Veresk =

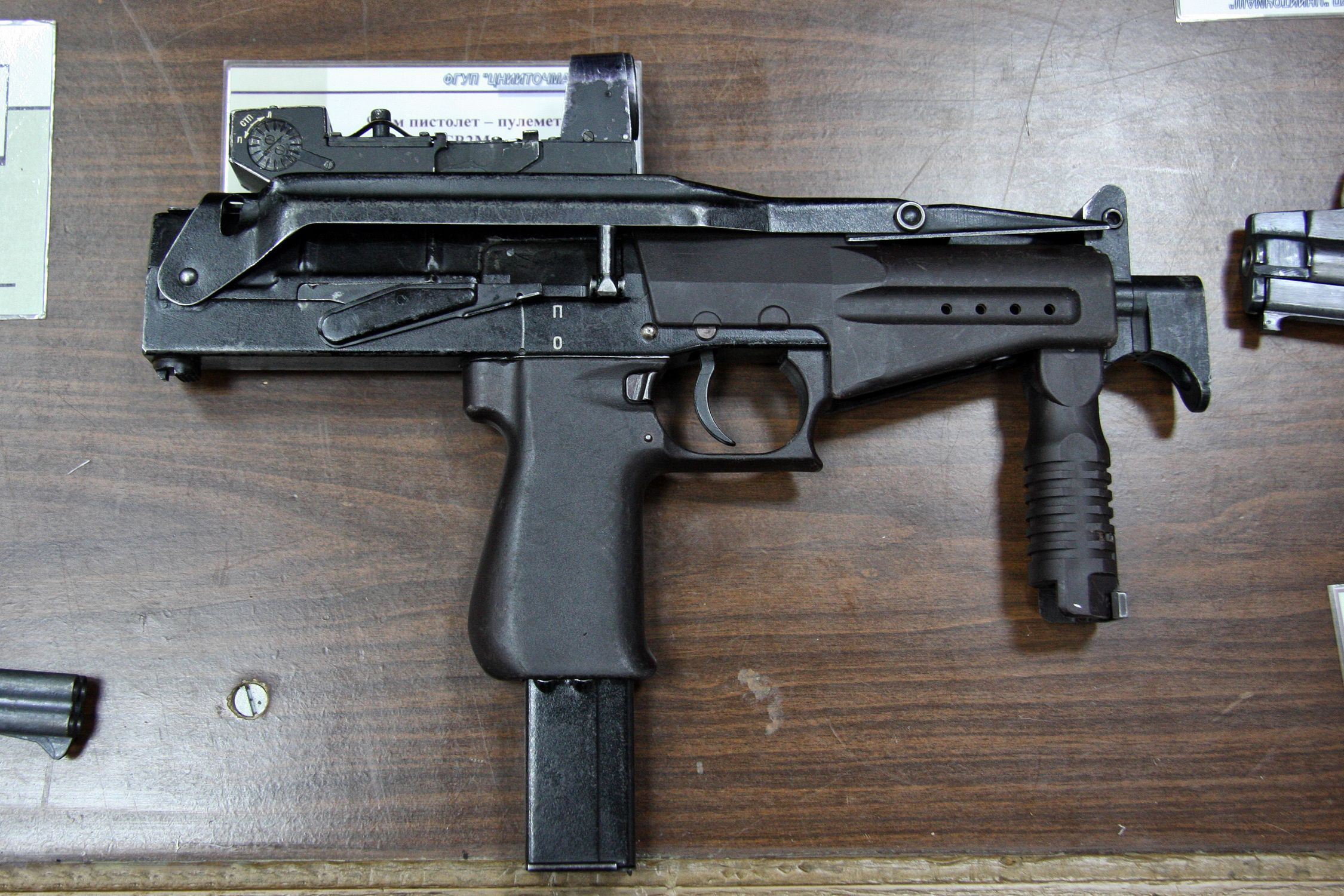
- SR-2M 9×21mm submachine gun
- Type: Submachine gun Personal defense weapon
- Place of origin: Russia

Service history
- In service: 1999–present
- Wars: Insurgency in the North Caucasus

Production history
- Designed: mid to late 1990s
- Manufacturer: TsNIITochMash
- Produced: 1999–2005 (SR-2); 2005–present (SR-2M)

Specifications
- Mass: 1.65 kg (3.6 lb)
- Length: 603 mm (23.7 in) stock extended 367 mm (14.4 in) stock folded
- Barrel length: 174 mm (6.9 in)
- Cartridge: 9×21mm Gyurza
- Action: Gas-operated, rotating bolt
- Rate of fire: 950 rounds/min
- Muzzle velocity: 415–430 m/s (1,360–1,410 ft/s)
- Effective firing range: 100 m (330 ft)
- Maximum firing range: 200 m (660 ft)
- Feed system: 20- or 30-round detachable box magazine
- Sights: KP SR-2 reflex sight (red-dot sight)

The SR-2 "Veresk" (Russian: СР-2 «Вереск», English: Heather) is a Russian submachine gun designed to fire the 9×21mm Gyurza pistol cartridge.

== History ==
Development of a new submachine gun chambered for the 9×21mm Gyurza cartridge (also used by the SR-1 "Vektor" pistol) was launched in the mid-1990s on the request of Russia's Federal Security Service (FSB).

A weapon was presented in 1999, developed by TsNIITochMash in Klimovsk, which received the designation of SR-2 (Russian: Специальная Разработка 2, romanized: Spetsial′naya Razrabotka 2, English: Special Development 2) and nicknamed "Veresk" ("Heather").

"Veresk" and its round were created as a compact weapon capable of engaging enemies wearing Russian class-II body armor (able to stop ordinary pistol bullets, such as 9×19mm Parabellum and 7.62×25mm Tokarev), and soft-skinned vehicles, at distances up to 200 metres.

== Features ==
The SR-2 "Veresk" differs from most submachine guns by its gas-operated action with rotating bolt, typically used in assault rifles (normally SMGs utilise different blowback principles).

This design is partially borrowed from the SR-3 "Vikhr" compact assault rifle. Externally the "Veresk" is similar to the Uzi; 20- or 30-round magazines are inserted into the pistol grip.

There are two AK-style control levers on both sides of the receiver: the right one is the safety switch, the left is a fire-mode selector.

The cocking handle is on the right side and is fixed to the bolt carrier, so it moves during firing.

There is a mount for a "red dot" sight on top of the receiver (unlike the AK-style side rail). The weapon has an upwards-folding metal stock.

== Variants ==
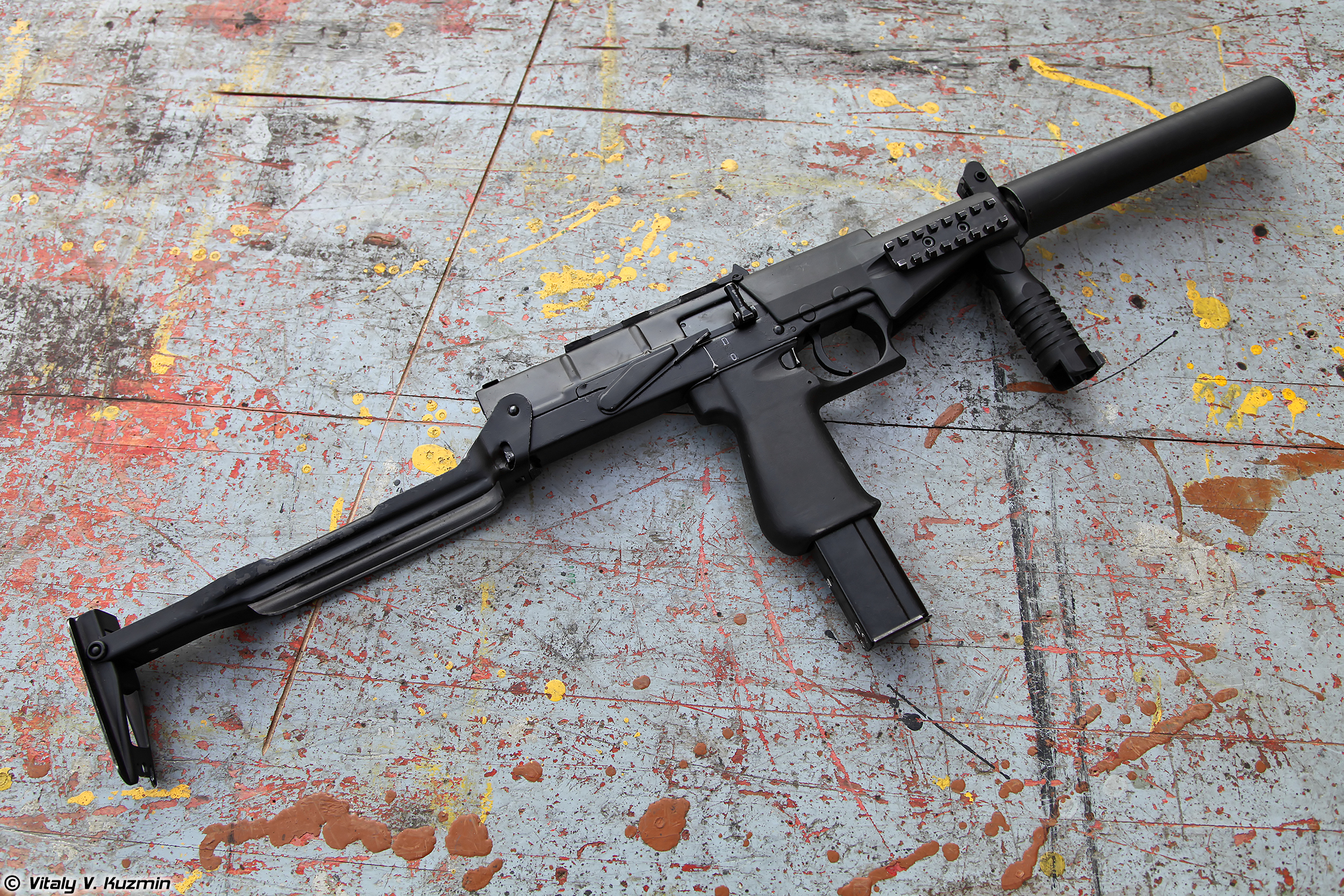
A right-side view of the SR-2MP with a suppressor.

=== SR-2M ===
Modified version that also has a forward pistol grip under the handguard, with a protrusion to protect the shooter's hand from muzzle blast and accidents (similar to the grip on the MP5K).

Its stock can be fully folded even with "red dot" sight installed. It is currently being supplied.

=== SR-2MP ===
Further modernised version that features picatinny rails on each side of the handguard and a sound suppressor.

== Users ==
- Russia
  - Federal Security Service
  - Law enforcement in Russia

== See also ==
- PP-90M1
- PP-19 Vityaz
- PP-2000

=== Gas operated submachine guns/pistol caliber carbines ===
- Flint River Armory CSA45
- Heckler & Koch MP7
- SIG MPX
- Type 79 submachine gun
- Zastava Master FLG
