= Zastava Master FLG =

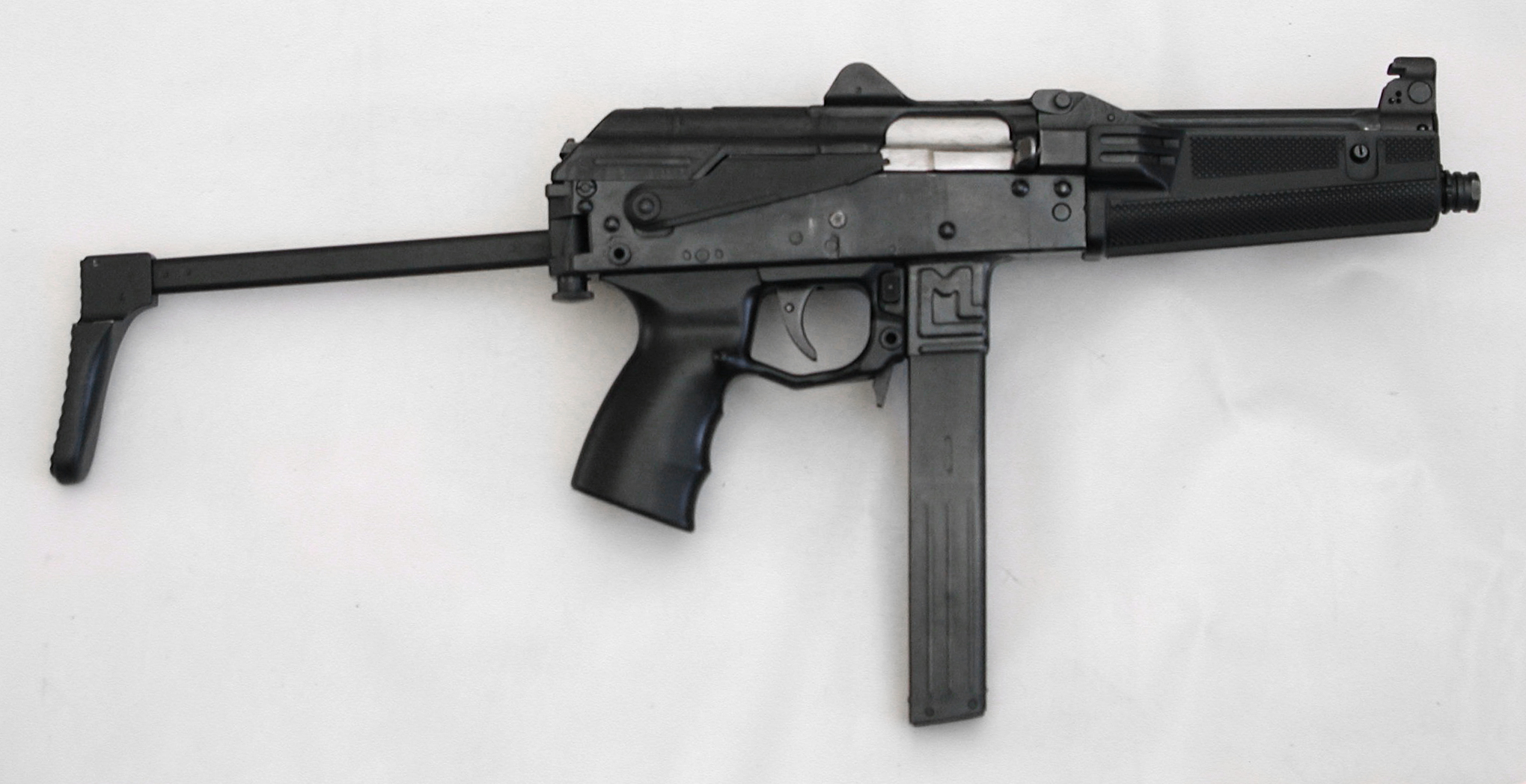
- One of the later prototypes
- Type: Submachine gun
- Place of origin: Serbia and Montenegro

Production history
- Designed: 1996
- Manufacturer: Crvena Zastava (Zastava Arms)
- Variants: FLG, FLG P and FLG K

Specifications
- Mass: 2600 grams (empty magazine); 3110 grams (full magazine)
- Length: 385mm (folded); 597-620mm (unfolded)
- Barrel length: 198mm
- Cartridge: 9×19mm Parabellum
- Action: Gas-operated, rotating bolt
- Rate of fire: 850 rounds/min
- Muzzle velocity: 400 m/s (1,300 ft/s)
- Feed system: 20 or 30 round double-stack box magazine
- Sights: tritium night sights

The Zastava Master FLG is a 9mm submachine gun developed by Zastava Arms in the early 1990s in Serbia and Montenegro. The FLG was designed with police and special forces in mind and was made from plastic and steel.

== Design details ==
The Zastava Master FLG is gas operated submachine gun based on M70 design, but also incorporates some design features found on MP5. Unusual for an AK platform, it uses a short-stroke gas piston. Special attention has been given to safety and ergonomic details and to prevent accidental firing when the gun is dropped or bumped. Weapon fires from a closed, fully locked rotating bolt. An internal lever blocks the triggering mechanism if the bolt is not fully closed.

All principle operations can be executed without moving the firing finger from the trigger guard. The gun features upper (ambidextrous) and lower magazine catch.

== Variants ==
Master FLG basic version

Master FLG P version with integral M.91-4 silencer

Master FLG K short barreled version with finger slip vertical forward grip handguards.

== See also ==
- Zastava Arms
- PP-19-1 Vityaz
- PP-19 Bizon
- PP-90M1
- RATMIL M96

=== Gas operated submachine guns/pistol caliber carbines ===
- Flint River Armory CSA45
- SIG MPX
- SR-2 Veresk
- Norinco Type 79
