= Pistol Mitralieră model 1996 RATMIL =

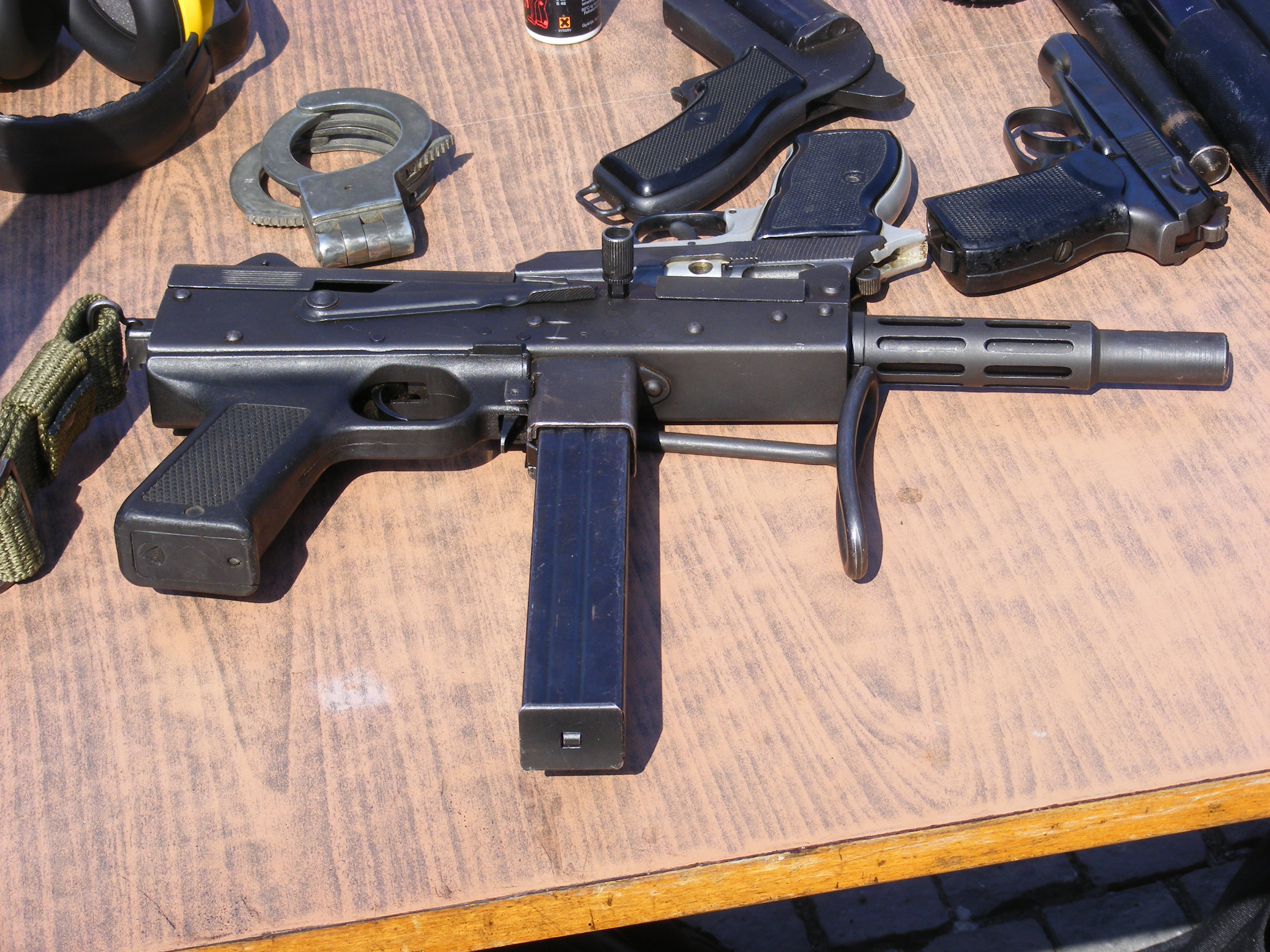
- RATMIL md. 96
- Type: Submachine gun
- Place of origin: Romania

Service history
- In service: 1996–present
- Used by: Romania

Production history
- Designer: RATMIL
- Designed: 1996
- Manufacturer: RomArm via Uzinele Mecanice Cugir
- Produced: 1996–present

Specifications
- Mass: 2.7 kg (5.95 lb) empty / 3.1 kg (6.83 lb) with loaded magazine
- Length: 650 mm (25.6 in) stock extended / 427 mm (16.8 in) stock folded
- Barrel length: 180 mm (7.1 in)
- Cartridge: 9×19mm Parabellum
- Action: blowback, selective fire
- Rate of fire: 800-900 rounds/min
- Feed system: 30-round box magazine
- Sights: rear sight adjustable for 50; 100 m

The Pistol Mitralieră model 1996 RATMIL (also called the RATMIL model 96) is a blowback operated, folding stock submachine gun chambered in 9mm Luger used by the Romanian gendarmes. Initially developed as the 9mm PM md. 96, the developer's name, back then RATMIL, was added to the name, in order to distinguish it from the Assault SMG, also called PM md. 96.

== Design details ==
The RATMIL PM md. 96 submachine gun is a simple blowback weapon, firing from open bolt in full automatic or single shots. It features stamped steel receiver and short slotted barrel jacket, with muzzle compensator at the front. The manual safety / fire mode selector is patterned after Kalashnikov AK assault rifle. Weapon is fitted with side-folding metallic buttstock and a polymer furniture (pistol grip and short forend). Iron sights consist of the L-shaped flip-up rear (marked for 50 and 100 meters) and protected front sight.

== Users ==
Romania

- Romanian Gendarmerie

== Gallery ==
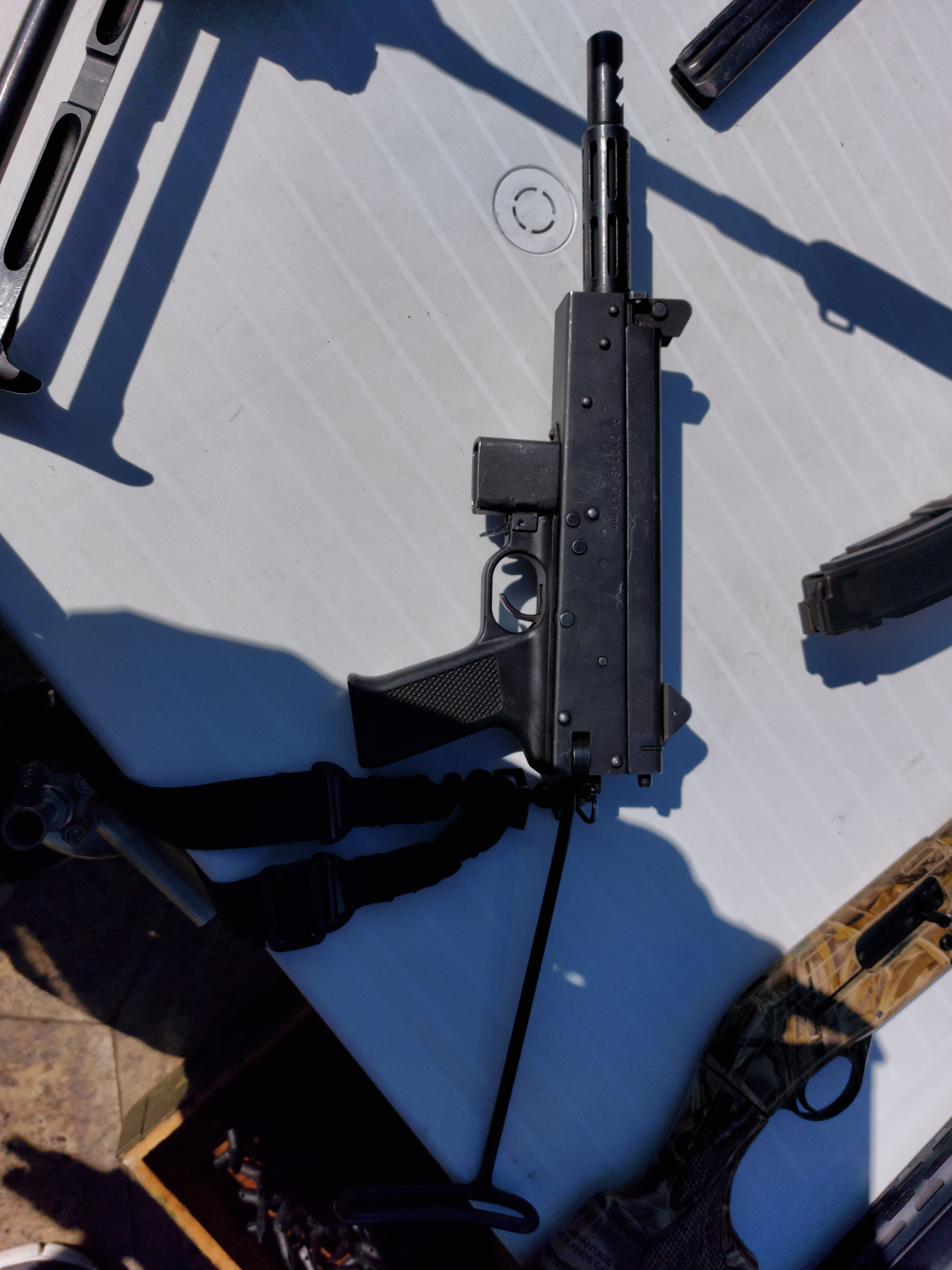
Back of a RATMIL SMG

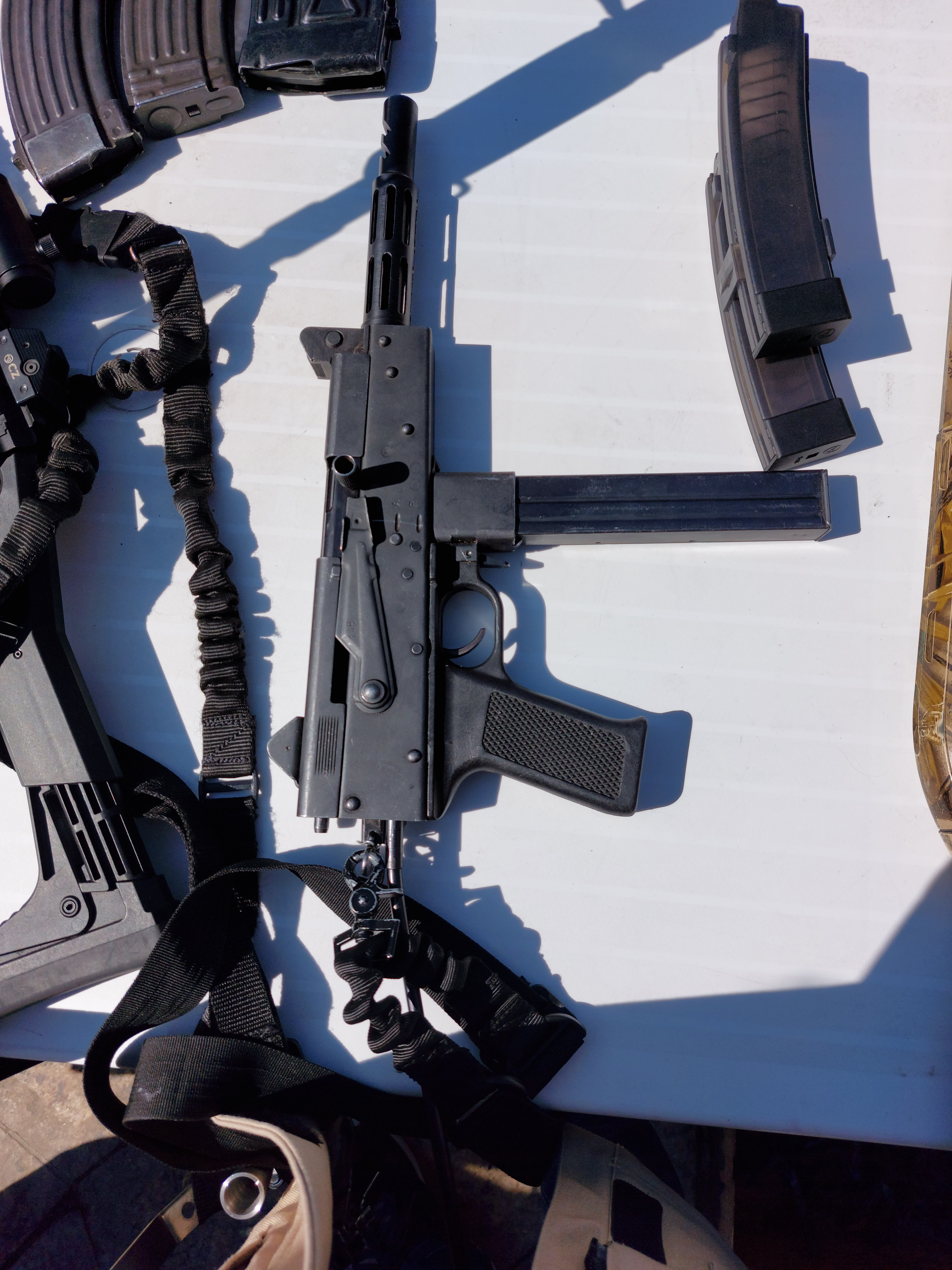
Front of a RATMIL SMG with magazine inserted

== See also ==
- Norinco Type 79
- Vityaz-SN
- Bizon
