= R9 =

R9 or R-9 may refer to:

== Military ==
- R-9 Desna, a Soviet ICBM
- USS R-9 (SS-86), a United States Navy submarine in commission from 1919 to 1931 and from 1941 to 1945

== Transportation ==
- Camai Air, IATA airline code
- R9 (New York City Subway car)
- Radial Road 9 or R-9, an arterial road of Manila, Philippines
- Renault R9, a small French family car
- R9 (RER Vaud), an S-Bahn line in the canton of Vaud

== Other uses ==
- HP roman9, an 8-bit character set with euro sign
- R_{9} color rendering index value for saturated red
- R9: Explosive when mixed with combustible material, a risk phrase in chemistry
- R9-Arms submachine gun, a black market submachine gun
- R9, a x86-64 register number 9
- R-9, a fictitious starfighter from the game R-Type
- "R-9", a 1985 song by electronic band Cybrotron
- Radeon R9, graphics processing units
- Rohrbaugh R9, a compact pistol
- Ronaldo (Brazilian footballer) (born 1976), retired Brazilian footballer

== See also ==
- Firestone XR-9, a 1940s American helicopter
- 9R (disambiguation)
