= SACO Model 683 =

- Type: Submachine gun
- Place of origin: United States

Production history
- Designed: 1980s
- Manufacturer: SACO defense

Specifications
- Mass: 3.29kg
- Length: 521mm (stock retracted); 699mm (stock extended)
- Barrel length: 233mm
- Cartridge: 9x19mm Parabellum.45 ACP
- Action: Blowback, open bolt
- Rate of fire: 650rpm
- Effective firing range: 150m 200m
- Feed system: 25-32-round detachable box magazine

The SACO Model 683 is a submachine gun made by SACO Defense. The weapon was designed as a cost effective weapon for allied nations who do not have high grade weapons production industry and facilities. SACO Defence halted its production during the 1990s on the grounds of a legal dispute when a copyright problem arose with the Brazilian firearms manufacturer PLANEV ("Mekanika Industria e Comercio"), when they found out the SACO Model 683 was an unlicensed copy of their Uru submachine gun.

== Overview ==
The SACO Model 683 is simple blowback operation fired from an open bolt capable of select fire. It is designed to be an easy to handle weapon for the soldier to use, made from steel stampings to reduce the cost of manufacture. The weapon is different from the URU externally: It uses an inline telescoping stock for increased accuracy which slides over the top of the receiver, a dual-function carry handle/tunnel sight for CQB, pistol grip, barrel shroud and compensator.

== See also ==
- List of submachine guns
