= PP-19 =

PP-19 may refer to:

- PP-19 Bizon
- PP-19 Vityaz

== See also ==
- Kalashnikov Concern
