= Rexim-Favor =

Rexim-Favor submachine gun
- Type: Submachine gun
- Place of origin: Switzerland

Service history
- Used by: Spain, Turkey

Production history
- Designed: 1953
- No. built: few
- Variants: Turkish M-68

Specifications
- Mass: 3.2 kilograms (7.1 lb)
- Length: 813 millimetres (32.0 in)
- Barrel length: 273 millimetres (10.7 in)
- Cartridge: 9×19mm Parabellum
- Action: Blowback, closed bolt
- Rate of fire: ~ 600 round/min
- Muzzle velocity: 396 metres per second (1,300 ft/s)
- Feed system: 20-round box magazine

The Rexim-Favor submachine gun is a Swiss submachine gun developed by the Rexim Small Arms Company of Geneva in 1953. Originally known as the "Favor," it received very little sales or use, but has become of note today for being the base of props used in the science fiction films Star Wars and Alien.

== History ==
Some say Rexim stole this design from the French. Whatever is true, the Rexim-Favor is a design that got very little interest, sales, or use, and then the company failed in 1957. The design was sold to the Spanish, who are believed to have made the original contract for the design. The Spanish tried to sell it under the name of La Coruña, with no takers. The only known service use was by the Turkish, who called it the M-68, and still use it to this day in small numbers.

== Design details ==
Despite its low sales, the gun was well-made, chiefly of pressings. It had a quick-release barrel, and the magazine is identical to the German MP 40.

The chief interest of the Favor was that it fired from a closed bolt—that is, the round was fed into the chamber by the action of the cocking handle and remained there until pressure on the trigger allowed the firing pin to go forward. Motive power was provided by two coiled springs, one working inside the other with an intermediate hollow hammer, and looking exactly like an old-fashioned three-draw telescope. When the trigger was pressed the depression of the sear released the linear hammer which went forward under the force of the large outer spring, struck the firing pin, and fired the round. Normal blowback then followed until the cycle continued.

The basic problem with the Rexim-Favor is that it was an old design for its time, very heavy and clumsy, being more of a carbine than a submachine gun. It was also thought that the firing mechanisms were too complicated for a submachine gun, where simplicity is an important factor. The Rexim-Favor can mount a bayonet and use NATO rifle grenades, but at a weight significantly greater than even most assault rifles, few wanted it.

== Film use ==
The Rexim-Favor was used as an SE-14r light repeating blaster pistol prop in George Lucas' 1977 film Star Wars, produced by 20th Century Fox and filmed in Elstree Studios in Great Britain. The barrel, stock, and magazine were removed and a low-powered scope was added, and it was first used as a pistol in several preproduction photos of an Imperial Stormtrooper. Similar versions of the prop later made their way into the film itself, being wielded by Dr. Evazan and Ponda Baba in the Cantina scene.

Two years later in 1979, the movie Alien (also produced by Fox) was being filmed in Britain. The Rexim-Favor was also used as the pistol carried by Kane, Dallas and Lambert when in their space suits, and may even be a recycled version of one of the props from Star Wars.

== See also ==
- List of submachine guns

== Sources ==
- Illustrated Directory of 20th Century Guns by David Miller
- Submachine Guns by Ian V. Hogg 5/25/2001
- The Parts of Star Wars
