= Flint River Armory CSA45 =

- Type: Pistol-caliber carbine
- Place of origin: United States

Production history
- Designer: Flint River Armory
- Designed: 2017

Specifications
- Cartridge: .45 ACP
- Action: Gas-operated short-stroke piston, rotating bolt
- Feed system: 25 round detachable box magazines

The Flint River Armory CSA45 is a semi automatic, large pistol caliber carbine manufactured by Flint River Armory of Alabama.

== Development ==
The CSA45 was developed by Flint River Armory of Alabama to fire larger than average higher pressure handgun cartridges. The weapon is based on the AR-10/AR-15 platform but with a few differences such as a large retractable stock/buffer tube to handle the excessive recoil of large/high pressure handgun cartridges.

== Overview ==
The CSA45 is a semi automatic, short stroke gas operated pistol caliber carbine chambered in the .45 ACP round and fed from 25 round detachable box magazines. It uses a rotating bolt with 4 locking lugs. The layout of the weapon is an AR15 type but with notable differences exclusive to this platform such as the rectangular receiver, non reciprocating cocking handle on the left side, large buffer tube/retractable stock and position of the rear takedown pin.

== See also ==
- List of carbines

=== Gas operated submachine guns/pistol caliber carbines ===
- SIG MPX
- SR-2 Veresk
- Type 79 submachine gun
- Zastava Master FLG
