= EDDA submachine gun =

- Type: Submachine gun
- Place of origin: Argentina

Specifications
- Cartridge: .22 WMR
- Caliber: .22
- Action: Blowback
- Feed system: 30 round detachable box magazine
- Sights: Iron

The EDDA submachine gun (Spanish:Pistola Ametralladora EDDA) is a submachine gun of Argentine origin.

== Overview ==
The EDDA submachine gun is a blowback operated weapon and is chambered in the .22 WMR round. It has select fire capabilities and is fed by a 30-round box magazine. To improve accuracy, it has a retractable stock and an optional Tasco red dot IR sight is mounted on the top cover.

== See also ==
- List of submachine guns
