= Parinco mod. 3R =

Subfusil C.I. Modelo 3R Parinco
- Type: Submachine gun
- Place of origin: Spain

Service history
- Used by: See Users

Production history
- Designed: 1959
- Manufacturer: Parinco

Specifications
- Mass: 2.7kg
- Length: 800mm (stock extended); 620mm (stock retracted)
- Barrel length: 280mm
- Action: Blowback
- Rate of fire: 600rpm
- Muzzle velocity: 360m/s
- Effective firing range: 300m
- Feed system: 32 round box magazine
- Sights: Iron

The Parinco mod. 3R is a submachine gun of Spanish origin that was designed in 1959. It is a selective-fire weapon for short-range street and brush fighting. It remains reasonably accurate up to 100 m using sighted semi-automatic fire. For close range combat, 2- or 3-shot bursts are recommended.

== Overview ==
The Parinco mod. 3R submachine gun is blowback-operated firing from an open bolt.

== Design and influence ==
The Mod. 3R is a simple blowback design and was made out of stamped sheet metal and a plastic grip frame. It uses the standard 9×19mm NATO round out of a 32-shot box single-column magazine. Army doctrine recommends to shortload the magazine to 28 rounds to prevent failures. A loading tool is used to assist loading the magazine.

The gun was designed with a 280 mm long barrel which featured a compensator and cooling fins. Empty casings are ejected out of the ejection port on the right, which has a hinged dust cover. This cover opens automatically when cocking the gun.

The bolt handle is on the left side and is non-reciprocating.

The stock is heavy steel wire and it telescopes along the receiver; one end is slotted for swabs and the other is threaded for a cleaning brush.

The sights are fixed and set for a range of 50 m.

The pistol grip contains a grip safety which must be held before the weapon can be cocked or fired.

There are three selector positions: safe, semi-automatic and full automatic fire. When set to full-auto; it is still possible to squeeze off single rounds with good trigger control.

Influence by some popular World War II-era designs is apparent. The barrel compensator and cooling rings are reminiscent of the Thompson submachine gun, the stock looks like the M3 submachine gun but modified to handle recoil, the bolt design is nearly identical to the Sten.

== Users ==
- Spain

== See also ==
- List of submachine guns
