= 9R =

9R may refer to:

- AIM-9R, a cancelled version of the AIM-9 Sidewinder missile
- Kawasaki Ninja ZX-9R, a 1994 sport bike
- New York State Route 9R
- No. 9r, a 1916 British rigid airship
- Phuket Air IATA airline designator

== See also ==
- R9 (disambiguation)
