= Ihor Oleksiyenko =

Ukrainian engineer, gunsmith and inventor

Ihor Mykhailovych Oleksiyenko
- Born: Ukrainian: Олексієнко Ігор Михайлович; November 27, 1946; Lukyanivka, Kyiv, Ukraine
- Died: August 9, 2007 (aged 60); Kyiv, Ukraine
- Occupations: engineer, gunsmith, inventor
- Notable work: "Goblin" submachine gun, "Elf" submachine gun

Ihor Mykhailovych Oleksiyenko (November 27, 1946 Lukyanivka, Kyiv - August 9, 2007, Kyiv) was a Ukrainian engineer, gunsmith and inventor, a native of Kyiv.

He was chief designer of the design bureau of special equipment.

== Biography ==
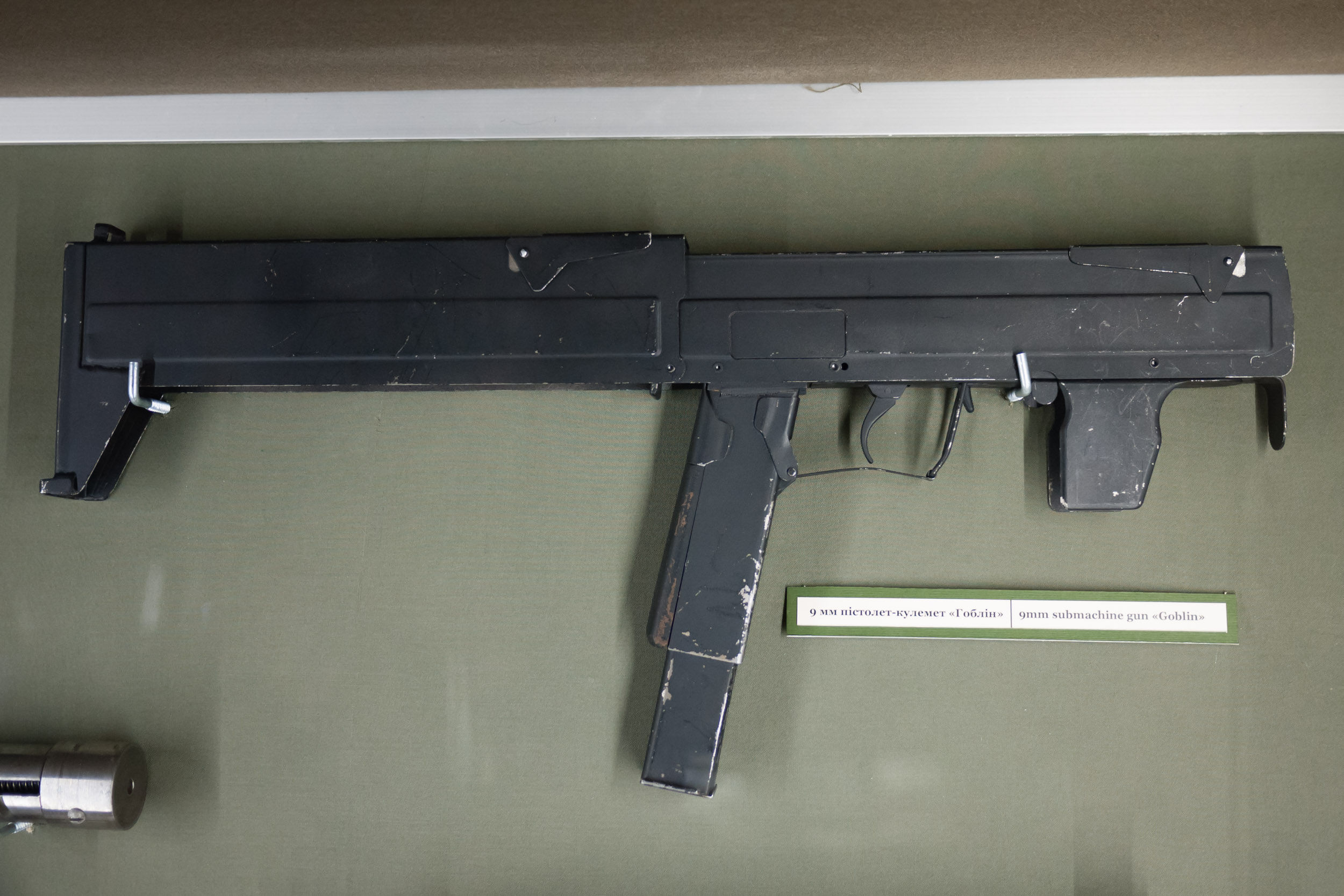
«Goblin»

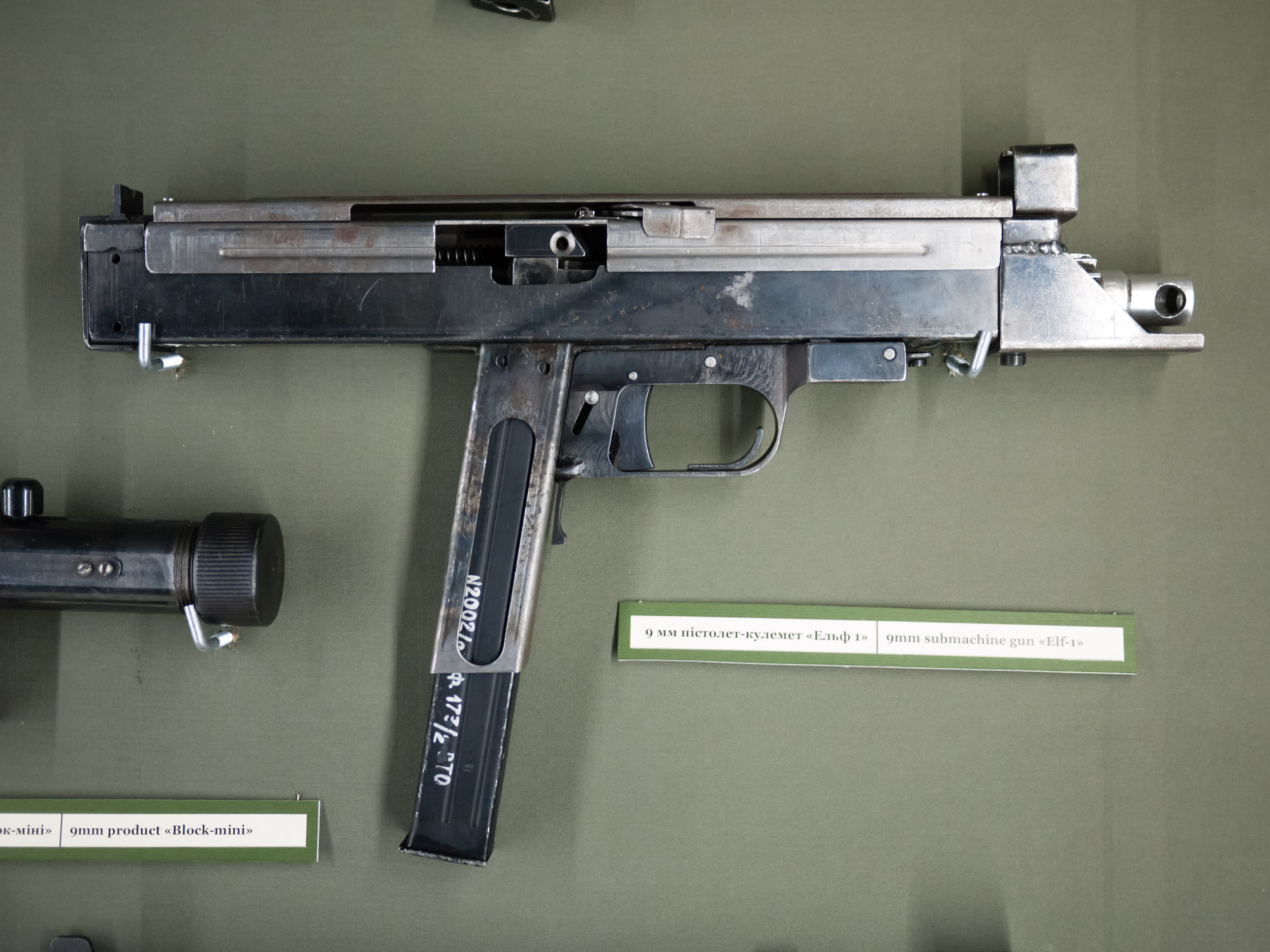
«Elf-1»

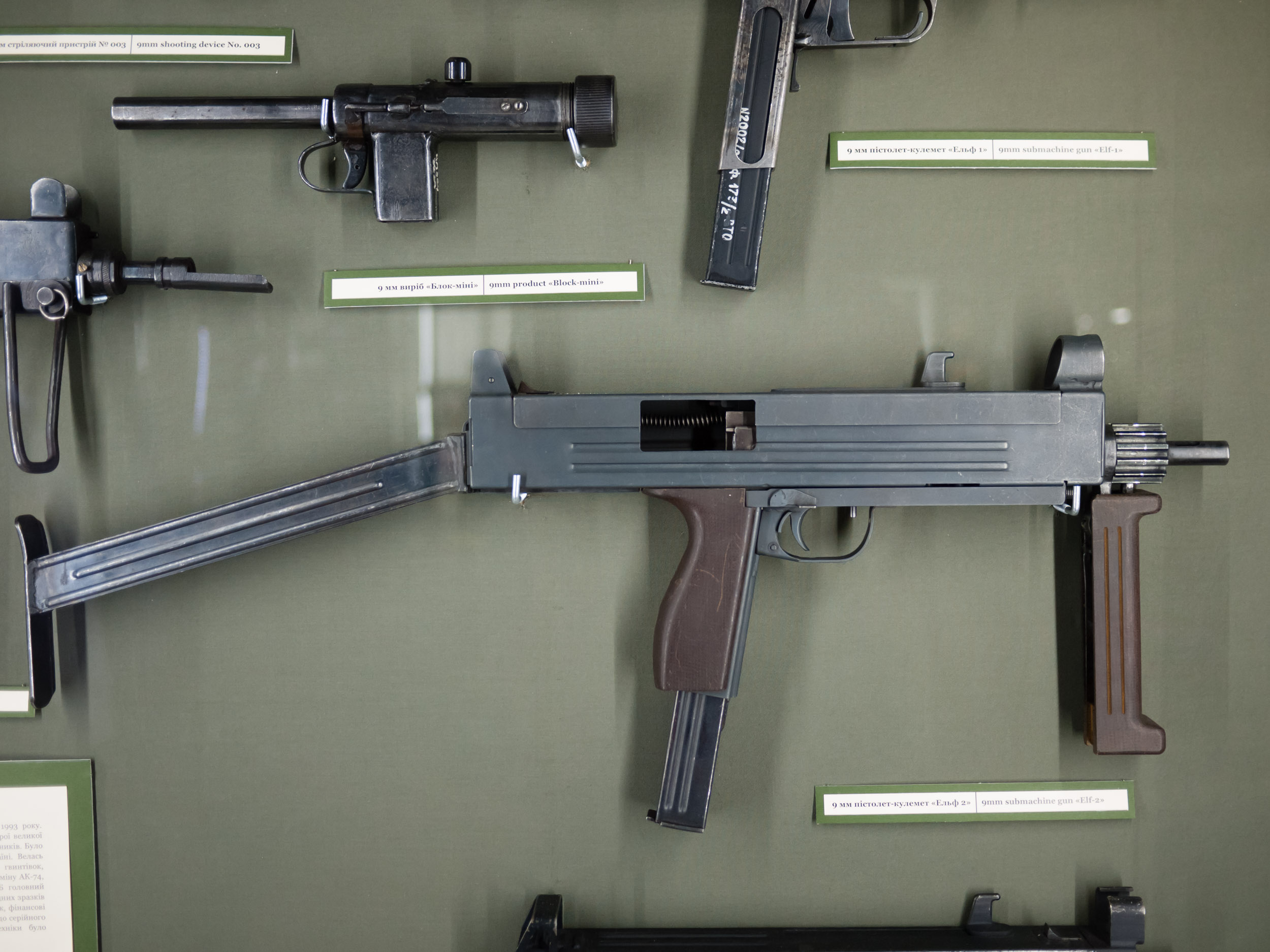
«Elf-2»

A native of Kyiv, he was born in 1946 in Lukyanivka. He graduated from the Kharkiv Military Artillery School and became a specialist in small arms. He served in the army, then worked for 15 years as a pyrotechnician at the Dovzhenko Film Studio. Later he worked in the KB of special equipment. The last place of work is the general designer of special equipment and thermal machines at the National Academy of Sciences of Ukraine. Oleksiyenko invented and developed pistols, submachine guns, submachine guns ("Elf", "Dwarf", "Goblin"). The developments are known because all of Oleksiyenko's weapons do not have recoil. It is believed that before making a hook or sight, he studied in detail all the world's counterparts. He did not want to be accused of plagiarism. He was married three times. From the first two marriages three daughters were born, in the third marriage he adopted two boys. In recent years he lived alone.

For the last six months before his death, he often watched the film "Winter Evening in Gagra". He told his relatives that he would die, like the protagonist, alone, that nobody needed him.

The president of the German company Schmeisser, Werner Resch, said in an interview a few years before his death that “only two ingenious small arms designers were born in the last century. One of them, Hugo Schmeisser, died a long time ago. The second is Ukrainian designer Ihor Oleksiyenko".

He is buried in Lukyanov Cemetery.

== See also ==
- Hugo Schmeisser
- Mikhail Kalashnikov

== Sources ==
- Ігоря Олексієнка порівнювали з Ґуґо Шмайссером
- Из нашего пистолета-пулемета можно прострелить броню!
- Профессиональный киллер стрелял в редактора одесской «вечерки» бориса деревянко из уникального оружия, изготовленного в подпольной мастерской, до сих пор не обнаруженной
- «новый украинский пистолет-пулемет не боится ни песка, ни пыли» // Факти, 12 грудня 2006
- Рассказ женщины мужчинам об оружии
