= KBP Instrument Design Bureau =

Russian defense company

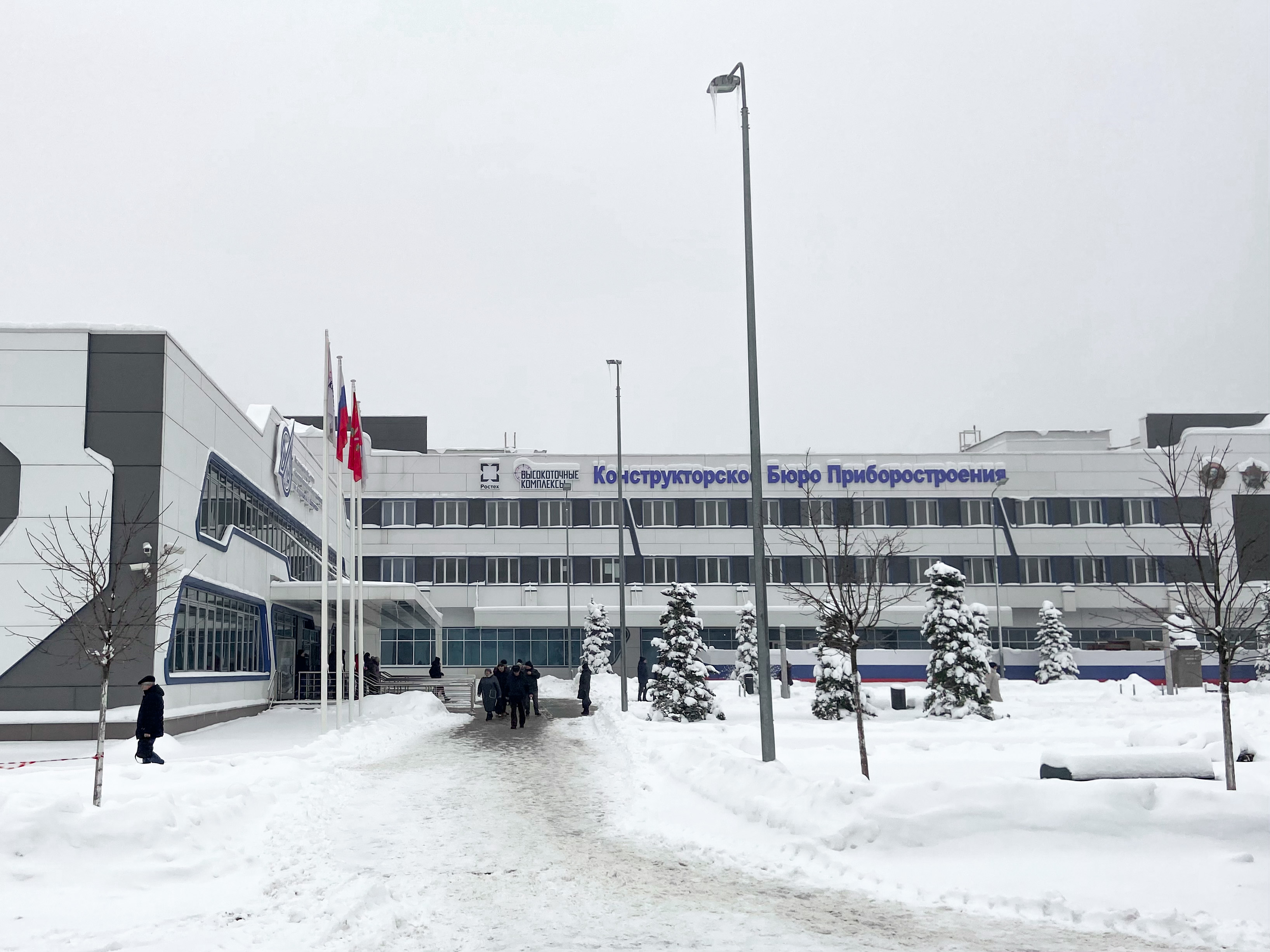
- Type: Joint-stock company
- Industry: Arms industry
- Predecessor: Instrument Design Bureau OKB
- Founded: 1927; 99 years ago
- Founder: Pavel Petrovich Tretyakov
- Headquarters: Tula, Russia
- Key people: D. Konoplev Managing Director; N. Khokhlov Chief Engineer, First Deputy General Director
- Products: Small arms, ammunition, ATGMs, anti-aircraft, autocannons, rotary cannons, CIWS, shells, precision-guided munitions, grenade launcherss
- Operating income: ₽14 billion
- Number of employees: 8,600 (2015)
- Parent: High Precision Systems (Rostec)
- Website: www.kbptula.ru

KBP Instrument Design Bureau, Officially Russian: АО «Конструкторское бюро приборостроения им. академика А. Г. Шипунова» (Кбп), romanized: AO "Konstruktorskoye Byuro Priborostroyeniya im. akademika A. G. Shipunova" (KBP), "Joint-Stock Company Instrument Design Bureau named after Academic A. G. Shipunov" is a Russian firearms manufacturer located in Tula. It is one of the main enterprises in the Russian defense industry and a major weapons supplier for the Russian Armed Forces. KBP produces small arms, autocannons, grenade launchers, and anti-tank and anti-air defense systems including air-to-ground, surface-to-air and ground-to-ground weaponry.

KBP was founded in 1927 as a small arms OKB of the Tula Arms Plant, and began to specialise in missile and precision-guided systems under the direction of Arkady Shipunov from the 1960s. It became one of the most successful OKBs in the Soviet Union, with many of its designs being adopted by the Soviet Armed Forces, and its employees winning 8 Lenin Prizes. Notable products of KBP include the TT pistol, the Makarov pistol, the Kornet ATGM, the Krasnopol guided shell, the Pantsir missile system, and PP-2000 submachine gun. KBP was privatised after the dissolution of the Soviet Union in 1991, and it is currently a subsidiary of High Precision Systems, part of Rostec.

== History ==
KBP was founded on 1 October, 1927 as an organization at Tula Weapons Factory, engaging in designing small arms. The first major success the organization made was in the Red Armory, where its Tokarev pistol was adopted into use in February 1931. In 1936, it was renamed TsKB-14 (Central design bureau No 14). During the Great Patriotic War large successes were made by aviation machineguns such as ShVAK, ShKAS, Berezin UB as well as VYa and Berezin B-20 aviation cannons. Over 80% of the domestic aircraft of the Soviet Air Force were equipped with weapons from the Tula designers.

=== Post-war years ===
Activities of the company were restored under the supervision of engineer-gunsmith Igor Dimitriev during the post-war years. KBP designed the PM, APS pistols, the AM-23 cannon, the 23-mm anti-aircraft cannon 2A7 for the Shilka system, the ZU-23 AAA alongside its dual 2A14 cannons in the 1940s and the 1950s.

The enterprise began designing guided weapons and high-precision missiles in the 1960s. The Kornet-E AT missile, the Krasnopol M-2 guided-missile system, the Tunguska and the Pantsir-S1 anti-aircraft cannon-missile systems, in addition to the Kashtan CIWS were designed in this period.

=== Post-Soviet years ===
KBP was heavily struck by the drastic reduction in state defence order and the financing of military R&D after 1991. Russia's debt to the KBP reached 20 billion rubles in 1994. Under such conditions the bureau's survival was only possible through the means of export. KBP requested the government of Russia to provide independent military and technical cooperation with foreign countries, and was confirmed and subsequently expanded by an order of the Russian president in 2000. A total of more than 160 designs were made by the KBP up until 1 October, 2012, the 85th anniversary of the founding of the enterprise. By this time the enterprise has integrated over 6500 inventors.

On July 16, 2014, the Obama administration imposed sanctions through the US Department of Treasury's Office of Foreign Assets Control (OFAC) by adding KBP Instrument Design Bureau and other entities to the Specially Designated Nationals List (SDN) in retaliation for the ongoing Russo-Ukrainian War.

== Structure ==
KBP's shares are held by OAO NPO Vysokotochnye Kompleksy and State Company Rostec. It has the following subsidiaries:

- TsKIB SOO
- Moscow subsidiary of KBP
- Science Research Center of Biology "Fitogenetica"

== Products ==
The following weapons have been designed by KBP:

- GWS Hermes Guided Weapon System
- Kashtan CIWS
- 30F39 Krasnopol 152-mm Laser Guided Projectile
- Drozd active protection system

=== Small arms ===
- 9A-91 carbine
- ADS amphibious rifle
- VSSK Vykhlop sniper rifle
- VSK-94 sniper rifle
- OSV-96 heavy sniper rifle
- PP-90 folding submachine gun
- PP-90M1 helical-feed submachine gun
- PP-93 submachine gun
- PP-2000 submachine gun/PDW
- P-96 pistol
- GSh-18 pistol
- Udar revolver
- Dragunov SVU sniper rifle
- Berkut hunting rifle

=== Cannons ===
- 2A7
- 2A14
- 2A28 Grom
- 2A38
- 2A38M
- 2A42
- 2A72
- AK-630 Gatling cannon
- GShG-7.62 Gatling gun
- Yak-B 12.7 mm Gatling gun
- GSh-30-2 cannon
- GSh-23 cannon
- GSh-6-23 Gatling cannon
- GSh-6-30 Gatling cannon
- ZU-23-2

=== Grenade launchers ===
- GM-94 grenade launcher
- AGS-30 grenade launcher

=== Anti-tank missiles ===
- 9K115-2 Metis-M (AT-13 "Saxhorn-2") anti-tank missile
- 9K121 Vikhr (AT-16 "Scallion") anti-tank missile
- 9M113 Konkurs (AT-5 "Spandrel") anti-tank missile
- 9M133 Kornet (AT-14 "Spriggan") anti-tank missile

=== Anti-aircraft systems ===
- Tunguska-M1 (SA-19 "Grison") anti-aircraft system
- Pantsir-S1 (SA-22 "Greyhound") anti-aircraft system
- 9M311 anti-aircraft missile
