= Lehnar submachine gun =

Subametralladora Lehnar
- Type: Submachine gun
- Place of origin: Argentina

Production history
- Designer: Juan Lehnar
- Designed: 1930
- No. built: 1 prototype

Specifications
- Cartridge: 9×19mm Parabellum
- Caliber: 9 mm
- Action: Blowback

The Lehnar submachine gun (Spanish: Subametralladora Lehnar) is a submachine gun of Argentine origin. Dating to 1930, it is the first indigenously designed weapon of its type.

== Overview ==
The Lehnar submachine gun was developed by Juan Lehnar in Argentina. It was a selective-fire weapon that fired 9mm Parabellum rounds fed by a curved magazine inserted on the left side of the receiver. Its features included a magazine that could be turned upwards to make it more compact for transport and an underfolding stock that reduced the length from 700mm/27.5″ to 290mm/11.75″. The wood foregrip could also be made to lie flat under the forward end of the receiver. Only a single prototype was built.
