= Tokyo Arsenal Model 1927 =

- Type: Submachine gun
- Place of origin: Imperial Japan

Production history
- Designed: 1927
- Manufacturer: Tokyo Arsenal

Specifications
- Mass: 3.2 kg
- Length: 690 mm
- Barrel length: 230 mm
- Cartridge: 8x22mm Nambu
- Caliber: 8 mm
- Action: Blowback
- Rate of fire: 1200 rpm
- Muzzle velocity: 340 m/s
- Sights: Iron

The Experimental Submachine Gun (試製自動短銃, Shisei jidō-tanjū) was a submachine gun of Japanese origin, manufactured by Tokyo Arsenal. The Imperial Japanese Army developed the Model 1927, which was fed from a drum magazine. It was ordered from Tokyo Arsenal and tested by the army. However, it was inferior to submachine guns such as the MP 18, and broke during the test. In 1930, a second trial was conducted, and the gun was again by rejected by the army. Model 1 was made in 1936 and Model 2 was made in 1937. Model 2 was at first 6.5 mm caliber, but was later revised to 8 mm.
