= Sputter Gun =

- Type: Bicep Braced Machine Pistol
- Place of origin: United States

Service history
- In service: None
- Used by: None
- Wars: None

Production history
- Designed: ~1983
- Produced: Never saw production

Specifications
- Barrel length: 7.8 inches (197 mm)
- Cartridge: 9×19mm Parabellum
- Action: Blowback-operated, Open bolt
- Rate of fire: ~500 round/min
- Muzzle velocity: 1,200 ft/s (365 m/s)
- Effective firing range: 50 yards (46 m)
- Feed system: 50 or 32-round detachable box magazine

The Sputter Gun was a prototype test gun using 7 major components from the WW2 era British Sten submachine gun carbine, along with other specially fabricated parts to make a complete operational firearm. It was designed to circumvent the existing U.S. Federal law defining a machine gun. The Sputter Gun, lacking any trigger, was designed to fire multiple rounds automatically, upon release of the bolt from its safety slot, until all ammunition was expended from the magazine.

== Background ==
In 1983, the ATF became aware that, William M. York, doing business as York Arms Co., was offering for sale a version of a Mk.II Sten that was capable of fully automatic fire that did not meet the Federal definition as a machine gun. York advertised the “Sputter Gun” (so named by his attorney friend Ron Boutwell) as a firearm for those "who want the fun and excitement of owning and firing a fully automatic firearm without the government tax and red tape." A then employee, Chuck Lanum, of the ATF Firearms Technology Branch (FTB) in Wash. D.C. made a scheduled personal visit to the York Arms Co. in Hurricane, Utah, to inspect and discuss some of the Sten-based firearms the company was manufacturing under their Class 2 FFL issued by the ATF. York had in attendance at this meeting with Lanum both an attorney and a court reporter. During that meeting Lanum offered his opinion that the Sputter Gun might be considered a “machine gun” under Federal law if a person's finger could be considered the “trigger” of the firearm.

== Classification ==
The Sputter Gun has never been classified or reclassified as a Machine Gun by ATF or any other organization of the Federal Government and thus has never been "outlawed."

The US Congress defined a machine gun in the 1934 National Firearms Act

...any weapon which shoots, is designed to shoot, or can be readily restored to shoot, automatically more than one shot, without manual reloading, by a single function of the trigger.

In spite of assertions by ATF or others this legal definition has never been changed by any Ruling or Congress and still stands as Federal law.

== See also ==
- Gun politics in the United States
- Firearm action
