= Pistolet maszynowy dywersyjny =

Polish prototype gun design

Pistolet maszynowy dywersyjny (often abbreviated p.m.d., literally: diversionary machine pistol) is a name applied to a Polish prototype compact submachine gun or machine pistol design. As the name suggests, the weapon was intended as a light-weight, small and reliable firearm intended as a primary weapon of sabotage squads. The basic requirements for such a weapon were drawn by February 1939, the prototype was to be completed by November of that year by the Instytut Techniczny Uzbrojenia institute. The weapon was to use 7.63 x 25mm Mauser cartridges. However, the outbreak of World War II prevented the completion of the prototype and it never left the drawing boards. Because of that, it never received official military designation and is referred to in literature by its descriptive name rather than a proper name.

== Bibliography ==
- (in Polish) Andrzej Konstankiewicz (2003). Broń strzelecka i sprzęt artyleryjski formacji polskich i Wojska Polskiego w latach 1914-1939 [Rifles and artillery equipment of Polish military formations and the Polish Army, 1914-1939]. Lublin: Wydawnictwo Uniwersytetu Marii Curie-Skłodowskiej. p. 298. ISBN 8322719442.
