= ASALT 96 =

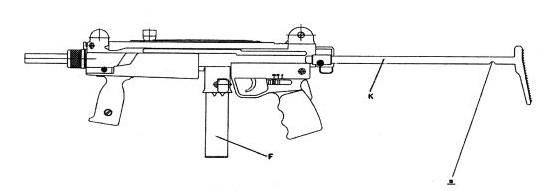
- ASALT 96
- Type: Submachine gun
- Place of origin: Romania

Production history
- Manufacturer: Uzina Mecanică Sadu

Specifications
- Cartridge: 9×19mm Parabellum
- Caliber: 9 mm
- Action: Blowback
- Feed system: Box magazine

The ASALT 96 (also called PM md. 96) is a 9mm submachine gun of Romanian origin. The weapon is based on the Uzi but with the magazine insert in front of the trigger group.
