= Type 79 submachine gun =

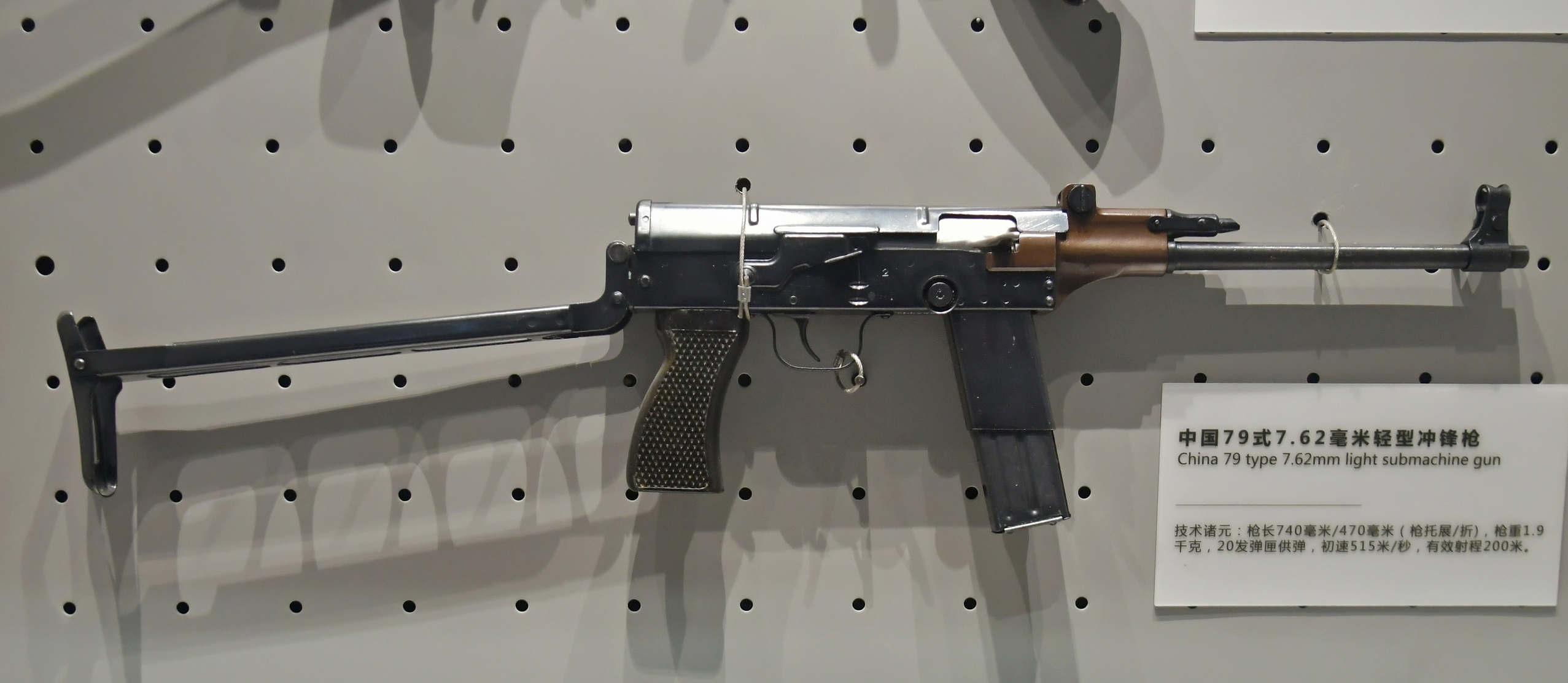
- Type: Submachine gun
- Place of origin: China

Service history
- In service: 1979–present
- Used by: People's Republic of China
- Wars: Sino-Vietnamese conflicts (1979-1991)

Production history
- Designer: Liu Zhitong
- Designed: 1970–1979
- Manufacturer: China North Industries Corporation and China South
- Produced: 1981–1992
- No. built: at least 200,000
- Variants: See Variants

Specifications
- Mass: 1.75 kg
- Length: 740 mm stock extended/470mm stock closed
- Barrel length: 250 mm
- Cartridge: 7.62×25 mm Tokarev
- Action: Gas-operated short-stroke piston, closed rotating bolt
- Rate of fire: 1000 rounds/min
- Muzzle velocity: 515 m/s
- Effective firing range: 200 m
- Feed system: 20-round box magazine
- Sights: Rear sight notch

The Type 79 (Chinese: 1979年式冲锋枪; pinyin: 1979 Niánshì Chōngfēng Qiāng; lit. '1979 Year Type Submachine Gun') but more commonly known as (Chinese: 79式冲锋枪; pinyin: 79 Shì Chōngfēng Qiāng; lit. '79 Type Submachine Gun') is the first generation indigenous submachine gun made in China. The submachine gun was certificated in 1979 and entered mass production in 1983.

== History ==
In August 1965, the People's Liberation Army (PLA) General Staff Department issued a requirement for a weapon that could be used by the Chinese military in a jungle environment. The 208th Research Institute of China Ordnance Industry was tasked to head the design. This development came in coincidence after the start of the Sino-Soviet split.

The project began to develop a prototype of "jungle submachine gun," and the research and development program began in 1966. It immediately encountered turmoil of the Cultural Revolution in the same year. The project was repeatedly canceled between 1966 and 1970. It was reinstated in March 1970, and its prototype and testing phase began between 1971 and 1978. Between 1971 and 1975, the designer identified mechanical problems during torture tests, which were associated with the immense chamber pressure of firing Chinese steel-core 7.62×25 mm ammunition. Type 79 had several design changes to fix the problem identified. The weapon was certificated in 1979, hence the name.

The weapon gained a notorious reputation when it was used by factions working for Lin Biao during his coup and the Gang of Four during the Cultural Revolution. In 1971, the development prototypes and design diagrams were stolen by the Lin Biao's coup participants, and hundreds of reverse-engineered copies were found after the coup failed. In 1976, the prototype productions were partially relocated to Shanghai as per an unusual request from the Ministry of National Defense. The illicit intention was to manufacture the weapon for the Gang of Four in Shanghai, where the Gang headquartered.

== Design ==
From 1971 to 1975, the prototypes failed twice in various torture tests, forcing the design committee to redesign it. This was mainly because the design of the chamber could not handle the pressure of 7.62x25 Tokarev ammunition.

From the 1981 pilot production, the total production of the Type 79 was nearly 200,000 until 1992 under Liu Zhitong. The highest years of production were between 1988 and 1991. During that period the Type 79 was produced at a rate of more than 30,000 per year. The developmental period of Type 79 was 15 years with a staff of over 70 people. The design was made for use with the PLA, keeping its weight light for jungle warfare operations.

The Type 79 fires 7.62 millimeter caliber steel-cored pistol bullets in either automatic or semiautomatic mode. The gun is a gas-operated rotating closed-bolt action with short stroke gas piston, located above the barrel, with a foldable butt stock. The bolt group and fire selector is influenced from the design of the Type 56 assault rifle, with the receiver and stock made from stamped steel. Setting it to "1" makes the weapon fire on single shot while setting it to "2" makes the weapon fire in bursts. Sights can be used to fire up to 100 and 200 meters.

The extended magazine housing serves as the de facto forward grip.

== Variants ==
=== ACE Mod ===
The first project to upgrade the Type 79 was in 2000 when Hong Kong weapon designer Lee Ka-Ho (Chinese: 李家豪) was tasked to create a conversion kit that would allow the user to attach a SureFire-type tac light and a laser sight. This kit was used by the Guangzhou and Dongguan Public Security Police.

=== PEAK 79 ===
Lee Ka-Ho continued to work on the first conversion kit, which resulted in the creation of another variant known as PEAK 79. This was first shown to the public at the first China International Police Equipment Expo in 2002, which was subsequently adopted by the Shenzhen Public Security Police in the same year. The PEAK 79 consists of a Heckler & Koch MP5-type fore-end with a SureFire tac light built in with the addition of a C-MORE red dot sight.

Introduced in 2008, WTW-79H is the simplified version of the PEAK 79 that allows for the installation of a tac light and laser sight.

=== TAPS79 ===
The TAPS79 (known as the Tactical Adapter Platform System for Type 79 SMG) is built with provisions for MIL-STD-1913 Picatinny rails and can have an OKO 8W red dot sight attached on the upper receiver. They were created at the same time as the PEAK 79, but TAPS 79 was not made public until working samples were exhibited in 2003. Testing on Type 79s with TAPS79 equipped did not finish until the end of 2003. It's known to be used by the Foshan and Guangzhou Public Security Police forces. Some models using the kit were also equipped with a corner assist shooting device mounted on the red dot scope.

The TAPS79 has five iterations.

=== MAPS79 ===
Lee's improved versions of the TAPS79, except that it has a chassis, including modular stock, that can be used to replace the Type 79's original furniture.

=== Unnamed Test Kit ===
In 2014, weapons designer Wang Jie (Chinese: 王杰) tested a conversion kit that allows for the installation of a new set of rails over the barrel and a collapsible stock.

=== Defender series ===
In 2014, Wang Jie produced another modification kit featuring an arrow-shaped handguard and a telescopic stock. Two types of Defender kits are available on the market in China, the regular kit and the Centurion kit.

=== Operational Briefcase ===
The Type 79 was reported to be tested in an operational briefcase-type device, equipped with a laser sight for aiming. As of 2014, it was reported to have completed combat trials with Chinese police forces, including those stationed at the Diaoyutai State Guesthouse.

=== Chengying series ===
In 2020, a new overhaul kit known as Chengying (Chinese: 承影) was released. The kit features a new lightweight M-LOK handguard, three new buttstocks, a new muzzle brake, a new pistol grip, an extended magazine, and a new ambidextrous magazine release mechanism for the magazine well. The Chengying kits drastically improved the ergonomics of the Type 79.

== Adoption ==
The Type 79 entered service with the People's Liberation Army after initial production was made from 1981 to 1982. During the war with Vietnam, Chinese soldiers on recon operations used the Type 79 as their main weapon, together with the Type 64. However, PLA feedback indicated the excessive rate of fire, limited magazine capacity, and reliability issues in jungle environments, including problems of jamming, making the weapon unsuitable for jungle warfare. The PLA decided to drop the Type 79 as the main submachine gun.

The weapon found immediate acceptance within the People's Armed Police and Public Security Police forces after the PLA phased them out of service. The weapon was extremely popular in the police force due to its gas-operated, closed-bolt design. The weapon is extremely accurate in semi-automatic fire mode despite being a submachine gun with high rate of fire. The reliability issue was not significant in urban environments, and subsequent modifications to the design resolved many earlier reported problems.

The Type 79 is one of the most significant weapon designs in China. From 1981 to 1992, more than 200,000 Type 79s were made.

Due to the large production run, Type 79 and its modernized variants are ubiquitous in Chinese police forces. In the early 2000s, Type 79s still in service were retrofitted with railed fore-ends to equip them with tactical accessories like attachable sights and new muzzle brake devices. This was first seen with the Guangzhou Public Security Police. Other police forces that adopted the modernized Type 79s included the Shenzhen, Dongguan and Panyu Public Security Police forces.

=== Replacement ===
The JH-16-1, BJC-16 and CS/LS7 were part of a weapon development program initiated by the Chinese Ministry of Public Security to acquire a new type of submachine gun, replacing the Type 79. All three submachine guns were introduced around 2017 and chambered in 9x19mm.

After trials, the CS/LS7 was selected to be the next-generation submachine gun for the Chinese police force, and was first showcased on the 70th anniversary of the People's Republic of China parade.

In PLA service, the Type 79 was replaced by the QCW-05 in 2001.

== See also ==
- QCW-05
- CS/LS7

=== Gas operated submachine guns/pistol caliber carbines ===
- Flint River Armory CSA45
- SIG MPX
- SR-2 Veresk
- Zastava Master FLG
