= R9-Arms submachine gun =

- Type: Submachine gun
- Place of origin: Unknown

Service history
- In service: Unknown-present
- Used by: Various Criminal Organizations

Production history
- Designer: Unknown
- Manufacturer: R9-Arms Corp. USA
- No. built: Unknown

Specifications
- Length: 9.5 in (24 cm)
- Height: roughly 7 in (18 cm)
- Cartridge: 9×19mm Parabellum
- Action: Blowback, Hammer-fired
- Rate of fire: Unknown, possibly 900rpm
- Effective firing range: 10 m
- Feed system: 20, 25, 32, 40, 50 Uzi magazines
- Sights: Some sort of Partridge style sights, likely 3-dot handgun

The R9-Arms submachine gun is a select fire submachine gun chambered in 9×19mm Parabellum. The R9 is notable because some of them are marked "R9-ARMS CORP. U.S.A.", although no such firm exists. It was made for sale to criminal organizations around the world. Unlike most improvised firearms, the R9 is not a copy of an existing weapon design, nor a low quality insurgency weapon such as the Błyskawica submachine gun.

The R9 markings on the gun claim that it is from the United States, but are likely an attempt to gain credibility or baffle local law enforcers.

== History ==
There is very little information on the origin, designer and exact number of examples of the R9.
A few have been seized in the Netherlands.
An example has allegedly been seized in the United States.

- 2006: Police and USKOK raided the home of the Vugrek family in Croatia and found an illegal submachine gun and pistol factory and seized an arsenal of weapons. They thought that that would be the end of illegal weapons factories in Hrvatsko Zagorje.
- 2012: A truck driver smuggling drugs from the Netherlands into the UK was arrested and was found to have an R9-Arms submachine gun fitted with a suppressor.
- July 2015: Police raided the Vugreks' house again and found and seized many R9-Arms submachine guns there.

== Speculation as to the gun's origin ==
There is much speculation as to where the gun is being produced, if it is still being produced. The most plausible theory is that they were produced in Croatia, due to the number of R9-Arms submachine guns confiscated there. Furthermore, Croatia is and has been the home of a number of illegal arms manufacturers, such as Mirko Vugrek and his sons, Mirko Jr. and Ivan. Mirko Jr went to prison on three separate times for making illegal guns, the Agram 2000, a four barrel gun disguised as a cell phone and a sub-machine gun called the R9 or RP9. Ivan went to prison once for making the Agram, after being released he stayed out of trouble and is a talented wind turbine designer.
