= PP-90M1 =

PP-90M1 (ПП-90М1)
- Type: Submachine gun
- Place of origin: Russia

Service history
- Used by: See Users

Production history
- Designer: KBP Instrument Design Bureau
- Designed: 1990s
- Manufacturer: KBP Instrument Design Bureau

Specifications
- Mass: 1.60 kg (3.5 lb) (empty, without magazine); 2.06 kg (4.5 lb) (empty); 2.86 kg (6.3 lb) (loaded)
- Length: 620 mm (24 in) (stock extended); 410 mm (16 in) (stock folded)
- Width: 53 mm (2.1 in)
- Cartridge: 9×19mm Parabellum; 9×19mm 7N31
- Action: Blowback
- Rate of fire: 500–600 rounds/min
- Muzzle velocity: Approx. 320 m/s (1,050 ft/s)
- Effective firing range: 200 m
- Feed system: 64-round helical magazine 32-round box magazine (prototype)

The PP-90M1 (Cyrillic: ПП-90М1) is a 9×19mm Parabellum Russian submachine gun developed by KBP Instrument Design Bureau in the 1990s. It features a 64-round helical magazine, and other than sharing a manufacturer is unrelated to the similarly named PP-90M.

== History ==
The weapon was designed at KBP Instrument Design Bureau at the same time as the PP-2000, with its original prototype initially designed by Vasiliy Gryazev. At this time, it was intended to feed from either a 64-round helical magazine or a 32-round box magazine using an adapter. The design was later revised by KBP with the 32-round magazine and its adapter dropped entirely.

== Design ==
The PP-90M1 operates via blowback, firing from a closed bolt. It is able to fire both 7N21 and 7N31 high pressure armor-piercing 9×19 as well as standard loadings.

The PP-90M1's receiver is almost entirely made from a single piece of polymer, with the bolt guides and ejector integrated directly into the barrel itself. The stock is designed to fold against the top of the receiver with the butt-plate facing outwards.The PP-90M1 is select-fire with both semi and fully-automatic modes. Instead of a charging handle, the weapon is charged by depressing a button on its front face to push back the long telescoping bolt.

The trigger mechanism uses a hammer specially weighted to increase its moment of inertia alongside a hammer spring of reduced strength. By slowing the bolt's rearward travel after firing and delaying the hammer's impact and the firing of the next shot, the weapon's firing cycle is lengthened and its rate of fire is reduced, aiding stability and accuracy.

The weapon is able to mount a flash hider or a suppressor.

== Users ==
- Russia: Used by Spetsnaz.
- Kazakhstan: Used by police forces.

== See also ==
- PP-19 Bizon, another Russian SMG that is similar in appearance to the PP-90M1
- PP-2000, another KBP-designed SMG using a similar weighted hammer mechanism.

== Sources ==
- "PP-90M1 9-mm Submachine Gun". KBP Instrument Design Bureau. Archived from the original on 6 April 2016.
- "PP-90M1". Modern Firearms.
