= Mekanika Uru =

- Type: Submachine gun
- Place of origin: Brazil

Service history
- Used by: Brazil

Production history
- Designed: 1977
- Manufacturer: Mekanika Industria e Commercio Ltd
- Variants: Uru 1 Uru 2 SACO Defense Model 683

Specifications
- Mass: 3 kg
- Length: 671 mm
- Barrel length: 175 mm
- Cartridge: 9×19mm Parabellum.38 ACP
- Caliber: 9mm
- Action: Blowback-operated, Open bolt
- Rate of fire: 750 rounds/min
- Muzzle velocity: 390 m/s
- Feed system: 30-round detachable box magazine
- Sights: Iron sights

The Uru is a submachine gun made by the production firm Mekanika and designed by Olympio Vieira de Mello Filho in 1977 for the Brazilian Army and Police Forces. License for weapons in 1988, bought the branch of FAU, which modernized the Thompson submachine gun in model 2. The gun would have an unlicensed copy by SACO Defense, better known for producing the famed M60 machine gun.

The overall weapon has a cylindrical body. It made the front of the air vents for cooling trunk. A tubular casing in a shop, serving also as the front handle, trigger and pistol grip. There is also a safety/selector switch, which can be translated into two points: first - for self-shooting, second - for the automatic.

There are a few different versions of the Uru: standard models chambered in 9mm Parabellum, which include early models with fixed tubular stocks and later examples with both wire and tubular folding stocks, and a pistol-caliber carbine in .38 ACP with a wooden buttstock. Optional accessories include a conical flash hider and a special barrel featuring an integrated sound suppressor that the operator may swap to rather than the standard barrel pattern.

== History ==
The weapon was designed by Olympio Vieira de Mello Filho, with characteristics he found lacking in other guns. After rigorous testing at Marabaia Proving Grounds, the brazilian army decided in favour of full production of the weapon, creating Mekanika specifically for the purpose of manufacturing the Uru. In the same year the company would also get the rights to manufacturing the Mekanika Uirapuru, also designed by Olympio.

After testing the gun alongside FN Herstal, the US company SACO Defense manufactured the Uru as the Model 683, aiming to sell the weapon for the US military for the Joint Service Small Arms Program. It was also marketed for countries without an industrial basis but were sued for copyright violations.

The rights of the weapon would change hands, first to Vigorelli and Bilbao and then to Rossi (now part of Taurus Armas), with over 9000 of those weapons being produced. Some models were also exported to private companies in the US.

A safe with 2300 Uru submachineguns were found in a safe in 1997. Three SACO Model 683 can be find at the Institute of Military Technology museum in Titusville, Florida.

In 2017, São Paulo state Civil Police closed an illegal weapons factory which was manufacturing weapons based on the Uru.

== Operators ==
- Brazil: Used by the army and police, mostly out of service.
