= PP-2000 =

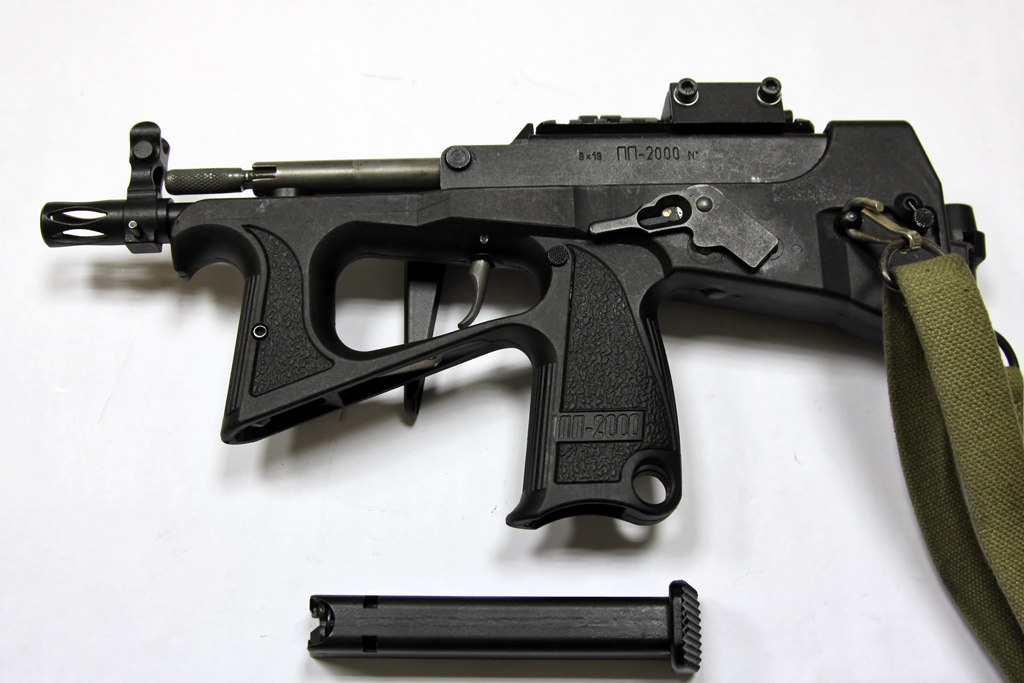
- PP-2000 with a detached magazine below it
- Type: Submachine gun Personal defense weapon Machine pistol
- Place of origin: Russia

Service history
- In service: 2006–present
- Used by: See Users
- Wars: War on terror Russo-Ukrainian War

Production history
- Designer: V.P. Gryazev; B.I. Kuzhetsov; A.I. Rasskazov
- Designed: 1993-1997
- Manufacturer: KBP Instrument Design Bureau
- Produced: 2006–present

Specifications
- Mass: 1.4 kg (3.09 lb)
- Length: 555 mm (21.9 in) stock extended / 340 mm (13.4 in) stock folded
- Barrel length: 182 mm (7.2 in)
- Width: 34 mm (1.3 in)
- Cartridge: 9×19mm Parabellum; 9×19mm 7N21 +P+ 9×19mm 7N31 +P+
- Action: Straight blowback
- Rate of fire: 600–800 rounds/min
- Effective firing range: 100 m (9×19mm Parabellum), 200 m (9×19mm 7N31 +P+)
- Feed system: 20- or 44-round detachable box magazine
- Sights: Front post, rear notch; MIL-STD-1913 rail provided for optics

The PP-2000 (Russian: ПП-2000) is a submachine gun made by the KBP Instrument Design Bureau.

== History ==
The PP-2000 was first publicly displayed at the Interpolytech-2004 exhibition in Moscow even though its patent was filed in 2001 and issued in 2003.

In 2008, the PP-2000 was adopted as one of the two standard SMGs of the Russian police (along with the Vityaz-SN).

In the beginning of October 2023, it was reported that the PP-2000 would become a part of Russian pilots survival kit.

== Design ==
The PP-2000 is a conventional blowback-operated weapon and weighs 1.5 kg (3.3 lb) empty.

The PP-2000 is designed as a close-quarter combat weapon, intended for riot police and special operations forces.

One unusual feature is the ability to store a spare 44-round magazine at the rear of the gun, where it also functions as a stock. A wire folding stock is also available on the mass produced variants.

Another unusual feature is that this firearm's charging handle is located directly behind the front sight and folds out of the way when not in use. A similar folding charging handle can be seen on the Heckler & Koch G36.

=== Ammunition ===
The PP-2000 is chambered in 9×19mm Parabellum, and specifically designed to utilize the new Russian 9×19mm 7N21 and 7N31 (Cyrillic: 7Н21 and 7Н31) +P+ armor-piercing versions of the cartridge.

This is intended to give the PP-2000 armor-piercing capability comparable to the FN P90 and Heckler & Koch MP7 personal defense weapons while also being able to use common 9mm Parabellum rounds.

== Gallery ==
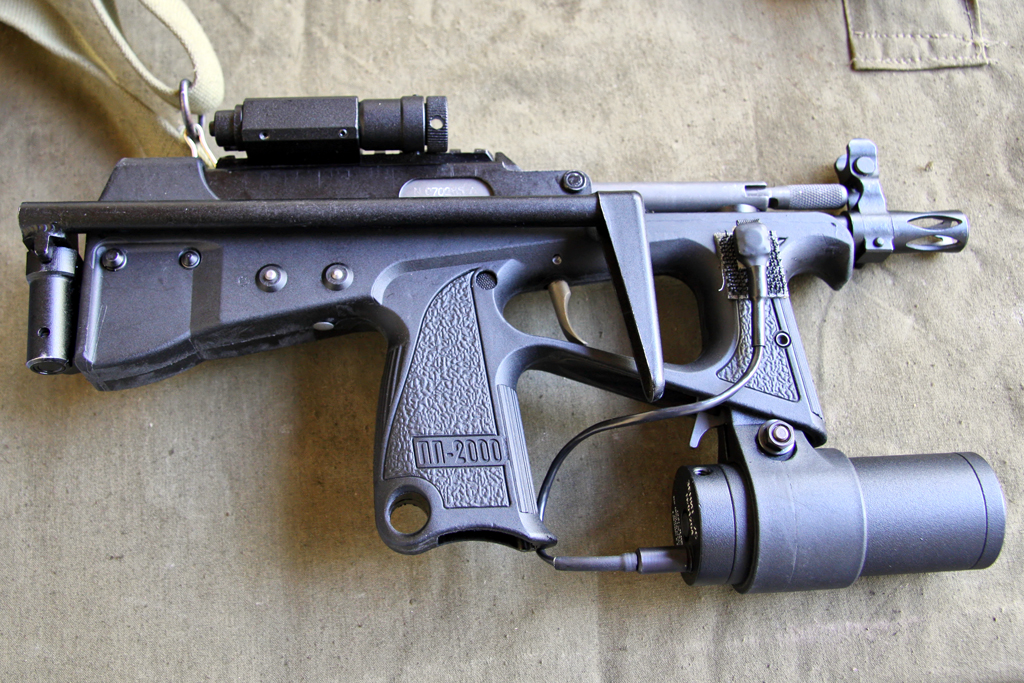
PP-2000 with Zenit-4TK laser sight and tactical light.

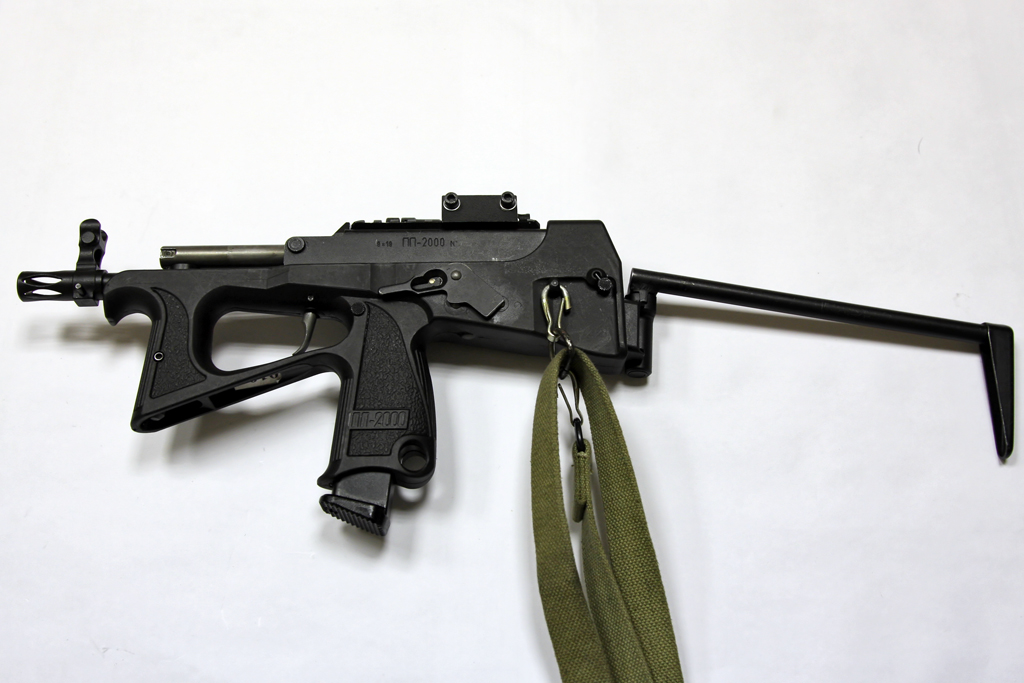
PP-2000 with Zenit-4TK laser sight, unfolded buttstock view

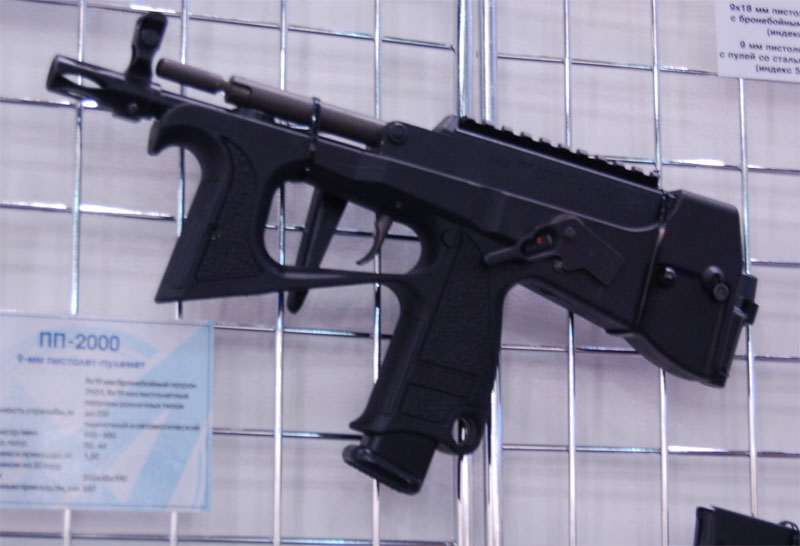
PP2000 with its stock folded

== Users ==
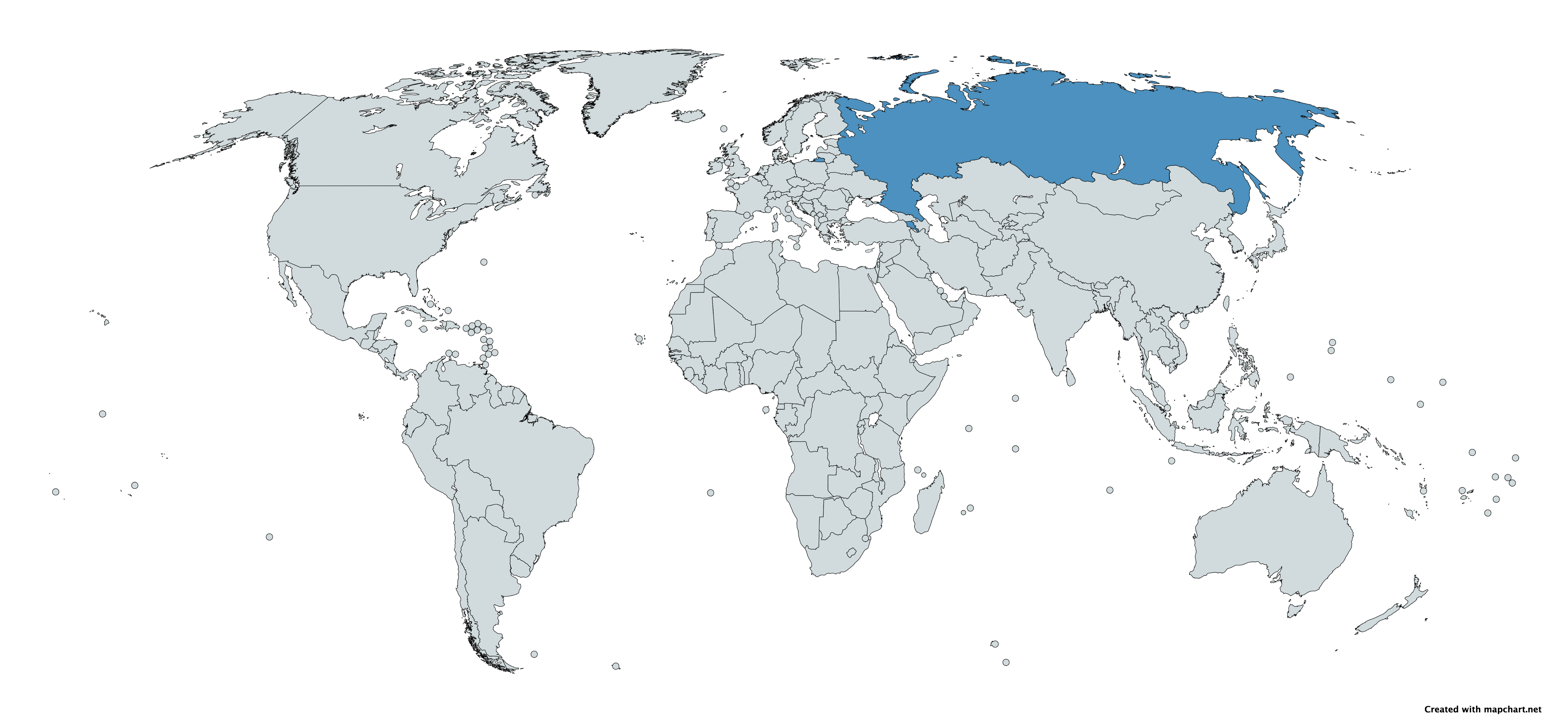
A map with PP-2000 users in blue

- Armenia
  - Police of Armenia
  - National Security Service
- Kazakhstan
  - Special forces
- Russia
  - Russian Air Force
  - Russian Ground Forces
  - Ministry of Internal Affairs

== Sources ==
- 9х19 мм пистолет-пулемёт ПП-2000. Руководство по эксплуатации ПП-2000.00.000 РЭ - 2008
- Ilya Shaydurov: Russische Schusswaffen - Typen.Technik.Daten. Motorbuch Verlag, 2010, ISBN 978-3-613-03187-6.
