= PP-19-01 Vityaz =

Russian submachine gun

PP-19 Vityaz
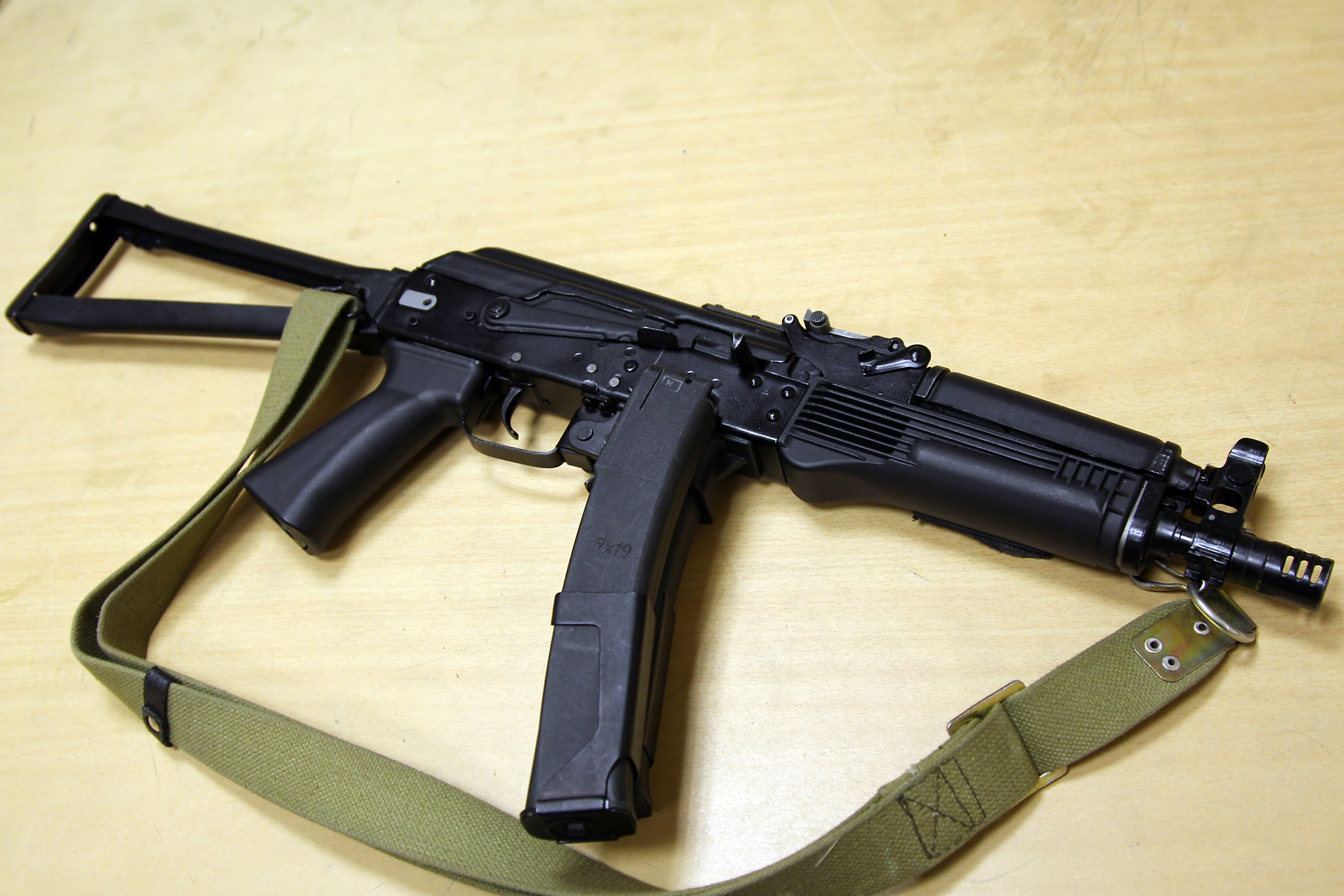
- Type: Submachine gun
- Place of origin: Russia

Service history
- In service: 2008 – present

Production history
- Designed: 2004
- Manufacturer: Kalashnikov Concern
- Produced: 2008 – present
- Variants: Version 10, Version 20

Specifications
- Mass: 2.9 kg (6.39 lb)
- Length: 705 mm (27.8 in) (stock extended); 480 mm (18.9 in) (stock folded)
- Barrel length: 237.5 mm (9.4 in)
- Cartridge: 9×19mm Parabellum; 9×19mm 7N31
- Action: Blowback, closed bolt
- Rate of fire: 800 rounds/min
- Muzzle velocity: 380 m/s (1,246.7 ft/s)
- Maximum firing range: 200 m (218.7 yd)
- Feed system: 30-round box magazine
- Sights: Adjustable iron sights and optional Picatinny rail or dove-tail side rail for mounting various optical or collimator sights

The PP-19 Vityaz (also known as the PP-19-01 "Vityaz-SN") is a 9×19mm Parabellum submachine gun developed in 2004 by Russian small arms manufacturer Izhmash. "Vityaz" (витязь) is Russian for "brave warrior" or "knight".

== Design ==
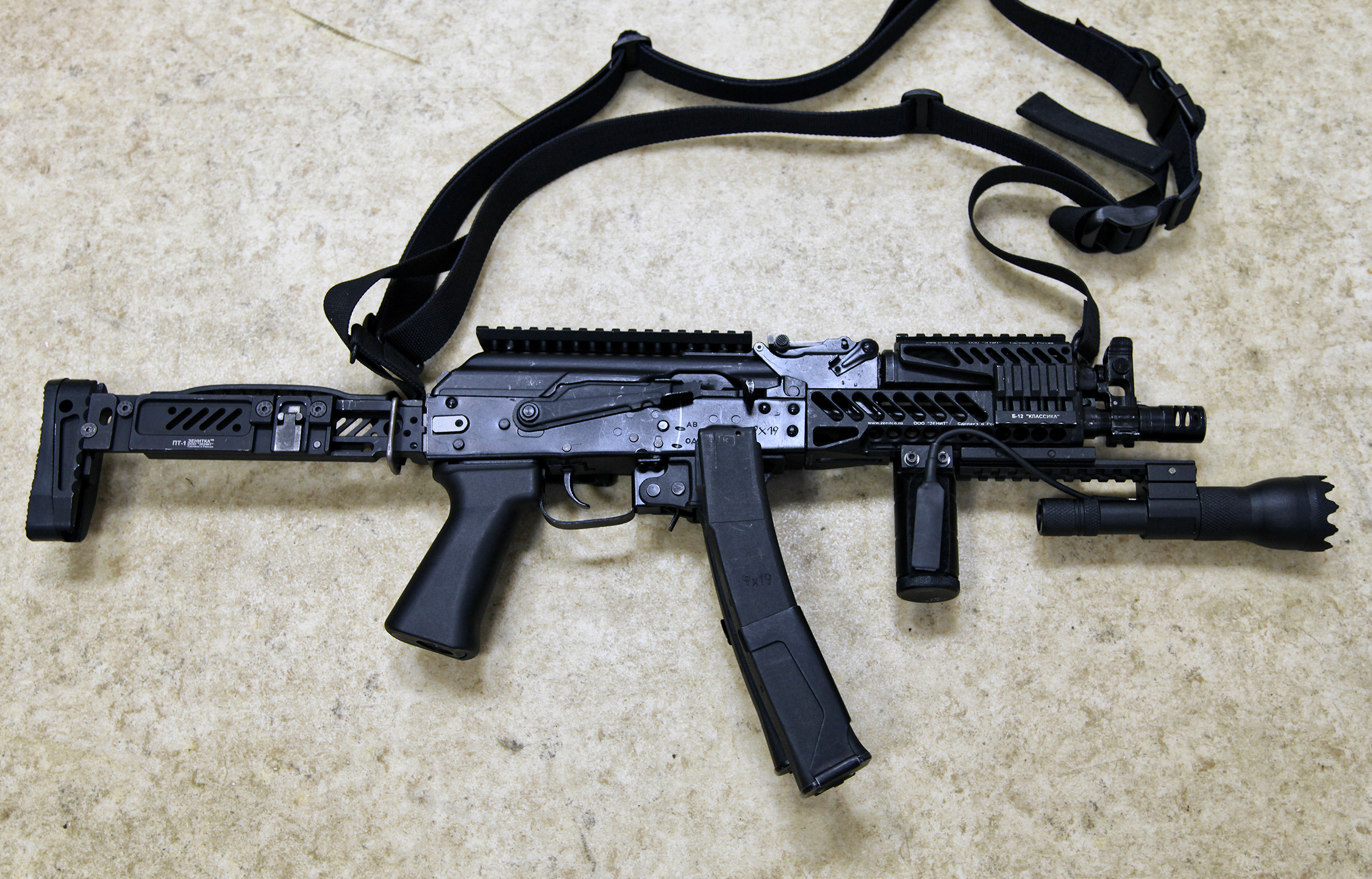
PP-19-01 Vityaz-SN with Zenit tuning

The PP-19 Vityaz is directly developed from the PP-19 Bizon.

=== Operation ===
The PP-19 Vityaz is a selective fire submachine gun that uses a simple closed bolt, straight blowback method of operation. It is based on the AK-74 and offers a high degree of parts commonality with the AK-74.

As such, it has no gas system and the internal components have been modified accordingly. The bolt carrier with integral charging handle is similar to AK-family, however the piston rod and rotary bolt were removed and a weight on the bolt extends into the previous gas tube. The return spring and guide rod are almost identical to those of the AK-family. The Vityaz has a four-groove barrel with a 240 mm (1:9 in) right-hand rifling pitch. Its muzzle brake has three small rectangular ports on each side that serve to reduce muzzle rise, however their main purpose is to protect the muzzle from damage. It can be equipped with a detachable sound suppressor.

==== Safety ====
The PP-19 Vityaz shares the same trigger and safety mechanisms as the AK-74 rifle.

The selector lever is placed on the right side of the receiver, above the trigger, and has three settings: the uppermost "safe" setting disables the trigger and physically blocks the charging handle; the middle position (marked "АВ") enables fully automatic fire and the lowest position ("ОД") activates the semi-automatic function of the trigger.

=== Ergonomics ===
The PP-19 Vityaz utilises the AKS-74 shoulder stock, which folds to the left side of the receiver. The pistol grip is identical to the grip of the AK-100 series and is made of a black fiberglass-reinforced polyamide 6. The handguard has attachment points for laser target designator, a tactical flashlight and a fore grip.

The PP-19 Vityaz is provided with two types of rail system for mounting various optical or collimator sights: a Picatinny rail on top of the receiver or a dove-tail side rail, and the standard AK-type front and rear sights.

=== Ammunition ===
The PP-19 Vityaz is chambered for the 9×19mm Parabellum pistol cartridge and will also fire the high-pressure, armour-piercing 7N31 round that can penetrate soft body armour. The gun is fed from a 30-round box magazine and comes with a fastening device that joins two magazines together.

== Variants ==
=== Vityaz ===
The original version of the submachine gun with a standard side rail and no railed dust cover.

=== Vityaz-SN ===
The original, but with a removed side rail and added railed dust cover.

=== PPK-20 ===
PPK-20 is a further modernization of the PP-19 Vityaz, developed and manufactured by Kalashnikov Concern.

The PPK-20 features the AK-19 folding telescopic buttstock, ambidextrous fire selector controls, an optional quick-detachable sound and flash suppressor, a Picatinny rail mounted on the dust cover for various optical sights, an improved handguard design with an M-LOK interface on the sides and slots for Picatinny rails on the top and bottom, and a lighter-weight design.

The 9mm PPK-20 variant with improved ergonomics and ammunition, increased reliability, and supplemented with a silencer completed state trials and was approved for serial production in July 2020.

The Russian Aerospace Forces decided to include the PPK-20 submachine gun in the survival kit for military pilots.

A modernized version is mass-produced as of late 2025 for Russian internal security and for export.

=== Saiga-9 ===
The Saiga-9 is a semi-automatic pistol-caliber carbine version of the PP-19 Vityaz with 345 mm barrel sold on the Russian civilian market by Kalashnikov.

=== KP/KR-9 ===
In the United States, Kalashnikov USA (not associated with Kalashnikov Concern) manufactures a 9.25 in (235 mm) barrel clone called the KP-9, and a 16 in (410 mm) barrel clone called the KR-9.

== Users ==
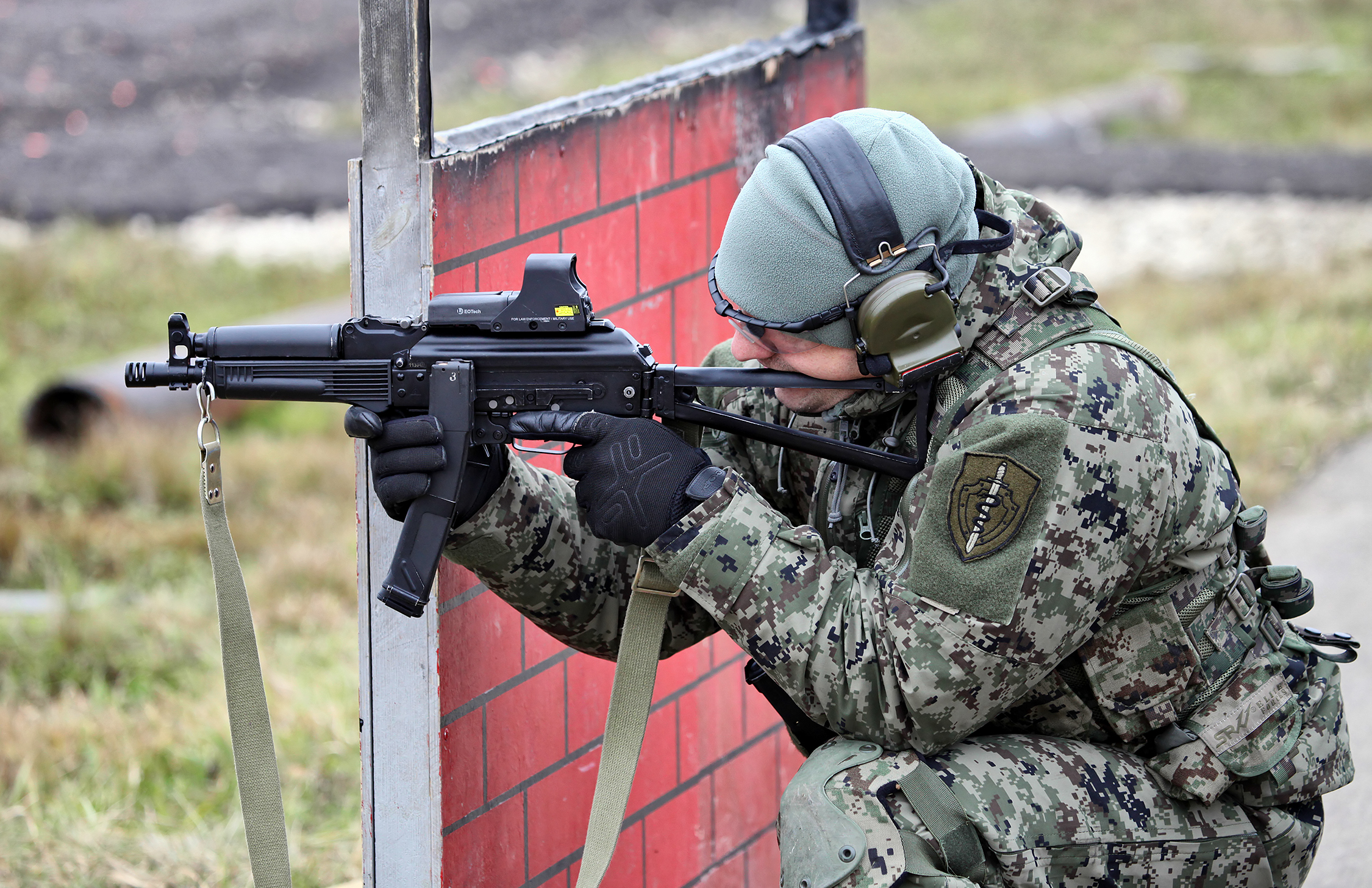
The PP-19 Vityaz at Interpolitex 2013

- Kazakhstan: Used by National Guard of Kazakhstan
- Namibia: Used by Namibian Marines.
- Russia: In 2005, it was adopted by the Interior Ministry. Used by various Spetsnaz units of the Interior Ministry, the Federal Security Service and the Federal Guard Service. The 9mm PPK-20 variant with improved ergonomics and ammunition, increased reliability, and supplemented with a silencer completed state trials and was approved for serial production in July 2020. The Russian Aerospace Forces decided to include the PPK-20 submachine gun in the survival kit for military pilots.
- Syria: Used by the Syrian Army.
- Uruguay: Used by police forces.

== See also ==
- CZ Scorpion Evo 3
- CS/LS7
