= Indústria Nacional de Armas =

INA S/A Indústria Nacional de Armas
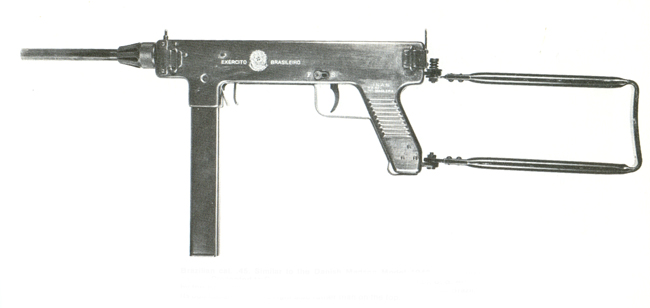
- Submachine gun INA M953 (MB50) - Brazilian licensed version of Madsen M1946
- Type: Private
- Industry: Ammunition, Arms industry
- Founded: 1949; 77 years ago
- Founder: Plínio Cardoso
- Defunct: 1972; 54 years ago
- Headquarters: Santo André, São Paulo, Brazil
- Products: Ammunition, Firearms

Indústria Nacional de Armas (INA) was a Brazilian firearms manufacturer.

== Background ==
In April 1940, the Brazilian Army officer Plinio Cardoso was in Denmark visiting the Dansk Industri Syndicat factory on an official mission, when the Germans invaded the country. Afraid that their submachine gun designs would fall into the hands of the Wehrmacht, the company handed the designs over to Plínio, who would return to Brazil and keep the designs safely away from Europe.

After the end of the war, the Brazilian officer returned to Denmark to return the designs, which began manufacturing the Madsen M-46 submachine gun soon after. In recognition of his work, the company granted him the rights to manufacture the weapon in Brazil.

Some models and first prototypes of the submachine gun would have been developed and adapted inside the IMBEL factory in Itajubá, in partnership with the engineer Euclydes Bueno Filho, who would join Plinio to found INA.

== History ==
In 1949, the Indústria Nacional de Armas S/A was founded in the Utinga neighborhood of Santo André. During the 1950s and 1960s, INA supplied thousands of M950 and M953 submachine guns to the Brazilian Armed Forces, which remained in use from 1950 to 1972, mainly in the Brazilian Army, where it was the standard weapon of use during this period.

The first model of the INA submachine gun (M950) was heavily criticized by the military at the time due to its quality. The original design had been changed to the .45 ACP caliber in place of the original Danish design caliber, the 9×19mm Parabellum.

It also developed two models of revolvers and a small pistol based on the Czech CZ-45. It was the first Brazilian firearms manufacturer to export products to the U.S. arms market, achieving great success with its Tigre revolver (exported to the U.S. market under the name Tiger), whose design was based on the Smith & Wesson Model 10 and used .32 S&W Long caliber.

In 1966, it released a new revolver model in .38 Special caliber (until then, restricted for the civilian market) and later, a model in .357 Magnum that would not have entered the production line. With the passage of the Gun Control Act in the United States in 1968, it had to develop several adaptations in its designs to meet the new North American gun laws.

After years of accumulating debt, a reduction in the volume of exports of its products, the replacement of its old machine guns in the armed forces by the new Beretta M12s, and an alleged influence of the military government to close the manufacturer, INA closed its operations in 1972, selling its machinery and factory to Companhia Brasileira de Cartuchos.

After the sale, the old factory was used by Companhia Brasileira de Cartuchos until 1983. IMBEL even manufactured 9mm caliber versions of the M950.

== Products ==
- INA Tigre revolver (.32 caliber S&W Long)
- INA .38 revolver (.38 Special caliber)
- INA Chanticler pistol (6.35mm caliber)
- Submachine gun INA M1950 (.45 ACP caliber)
- Submachine gun INA M1953 (.45 ACP caliber)

== Bibliography ==
- Welfer, Rafael (2014). A História da Indústria Militar Brasileira: Organizações, Complexo Industrial e Mercado durante o Século XX. Rio Grande do Sul: UNIJUÍ.
- Klare and Andersen, Michael and David (1996). A Scourge of Guns - The Diffusion of Small Arms and Light Weapons in Latin America. Washington, D.C.: Federation of American Scientists.
- USP (2006). As Transformações de Santo André de 1975 a 2005: Da Industrialização à Descentralização Industrial. São Paulo: Universidade de São Paulo.
- 2ª Região Militar (2017). Catálogo de Armas para Colecionamento da 2ª Região Militar. São Paulo: Exército Brasileiro.
