= Prøvestenen =

Prøvestenen may refer to:

- Prøvestenen, Copenhagen
- Prøvestenen, Helsingør
  - Prøvestenscentret
- Fort Prøvestenen, an auxiliary fort near the Danish colonial Fort Christiansborg (now in Ghana)
