= INA Model 953 =

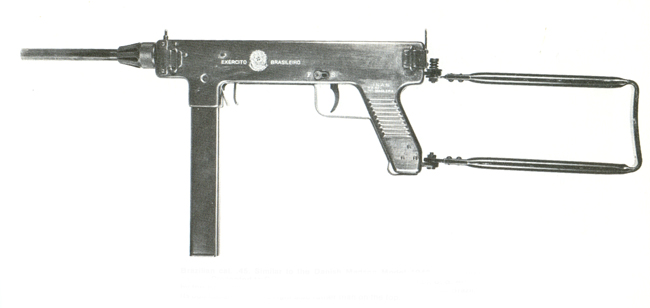
- INA Model 953 with unfolded stock.
- Type: Sub machine gun
- Place of origin: Brazil

Service history
- In service: 1950 - late 1980s?
- Wars: Suez Crisis; Araguaia Guerrilla War

Production history
- Designer: Dansk Industri Syndikat
- Designed: 1950
- Manufacturer: Indústria Nacional de Armas
- Variants: M.B.-50

Specifications
- Mass: 7.50 Pounds (3.4 kg)
- Length: 31.26" with stock open
- Caliber: .45 ACP
- Action: Blowback-operated, Open bolt
- Rate of fire: 650 rpm
- Muzzle velocity: 740 ft/s
- Effective firing range: 100 m
- Feed system: 30-round detachable box magazine
- Sights: Single aperature set for 100 m

The INA Model 953 is a Brazilian submachine gun, manufactured and based on the Madsen M/50.

Revolutionary Carlos Marighella recommended this as the "ideal submachine gun for the urban guerrilla" in his "Minimanual of the Urban Guerrilla"

== History ==
It was manufactured by the Indústria Nacional de Armas in São Paulo Brazil under license for Madsen, which began in 1950.

== Design ==
The first Model was marked M.B.-50 and was manufactured till 1953 and was marked with a large Brazilian crest. In late 1953, the Model 1953 was introduced. Improvements on the 1953 model were a larger magazine housing and a metal loop riveted to the lower right side of the magazine housing. The loop could then hold the magazine housing together. Also the retracting handle was changed on the Model 953 to the right side instead of the top as was the buffer spring and the shape of the extractor, ejector and the firing pin.

The INA Model 53 is made of stamped sheet metal. It's an open bolt design which means it fires when the bolt is in the locked back open position with a fixed firing pin. The firearm is stamped from 2 pieces of sheet metal which are shaped with integral rear pistol grip and magazine housing. The two pieces fit together like a clam shell with the hinge at the rear of the pistol grip. It splits in half right down the middle of the top and bottom of the receiver.

The entire firearm is held together with a barrel locking nut which is threaded onto the fore section of the two receiver halves. The folding stock is made of tubular steel and it folds onto the right side of the firearm.

The Model 953 fires can only fire in full auto only and it also has a unique feature, a safety lever in front of the forward magazine housing. Firing the Model 953 requires griping the magazine housing and holding down the safety lever.

== Users ==
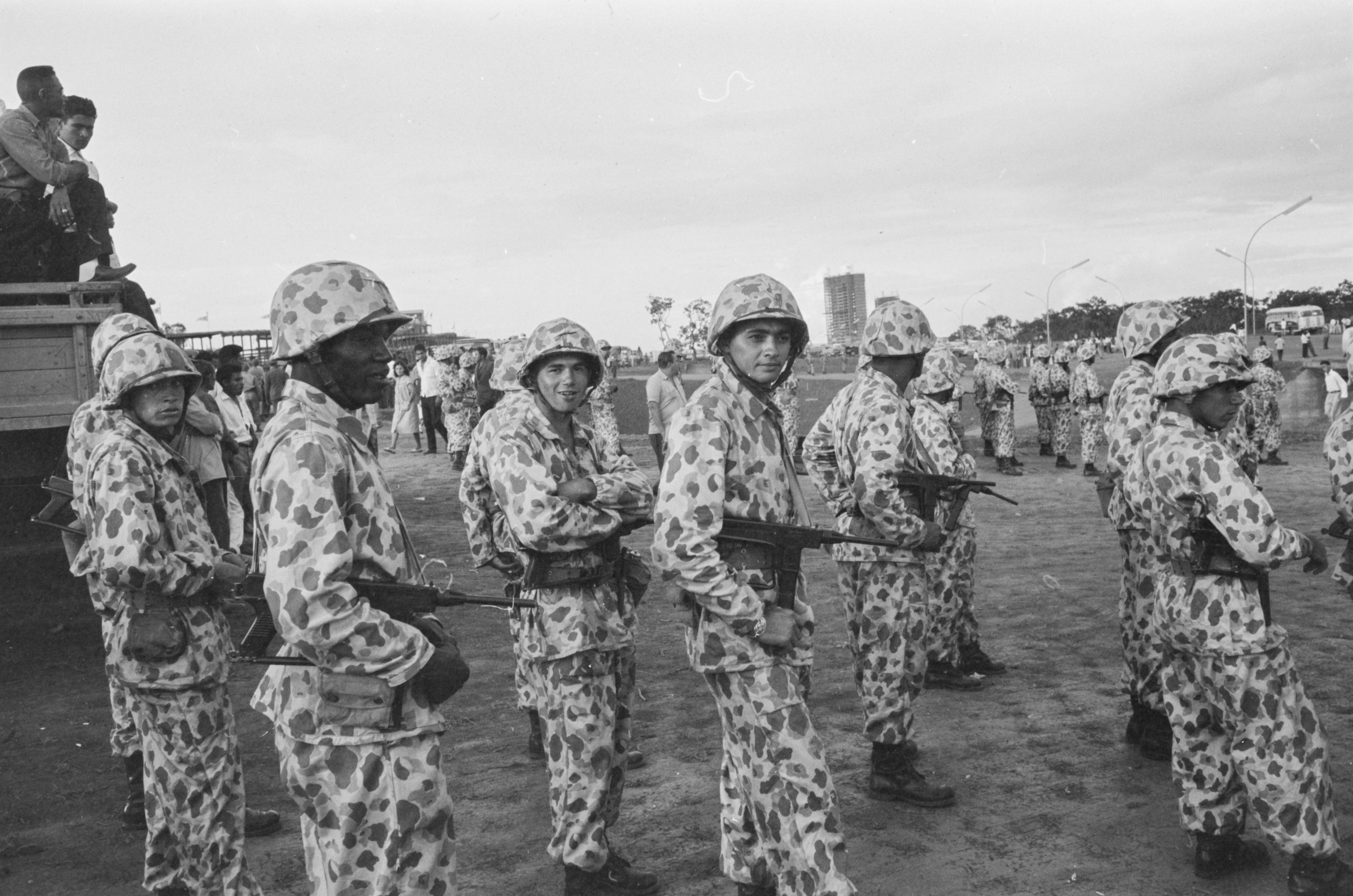
Brazilian troops with the INA M953 submachine guns in 1960

- Brazil: Formerly used by Brazilian military.

=== Non-State Actors ===
- Brazilian Communist Party
- Ação Libertadora Nacional
- Vanguarda Armada Revolucionaria Palmares

== Bibliography ==
- Nelson, Thomas B. The world's Submachine Guns. International small arms publishers: Cologne, Germany, '63
