= Madsen M1945 =

Madsen 1945
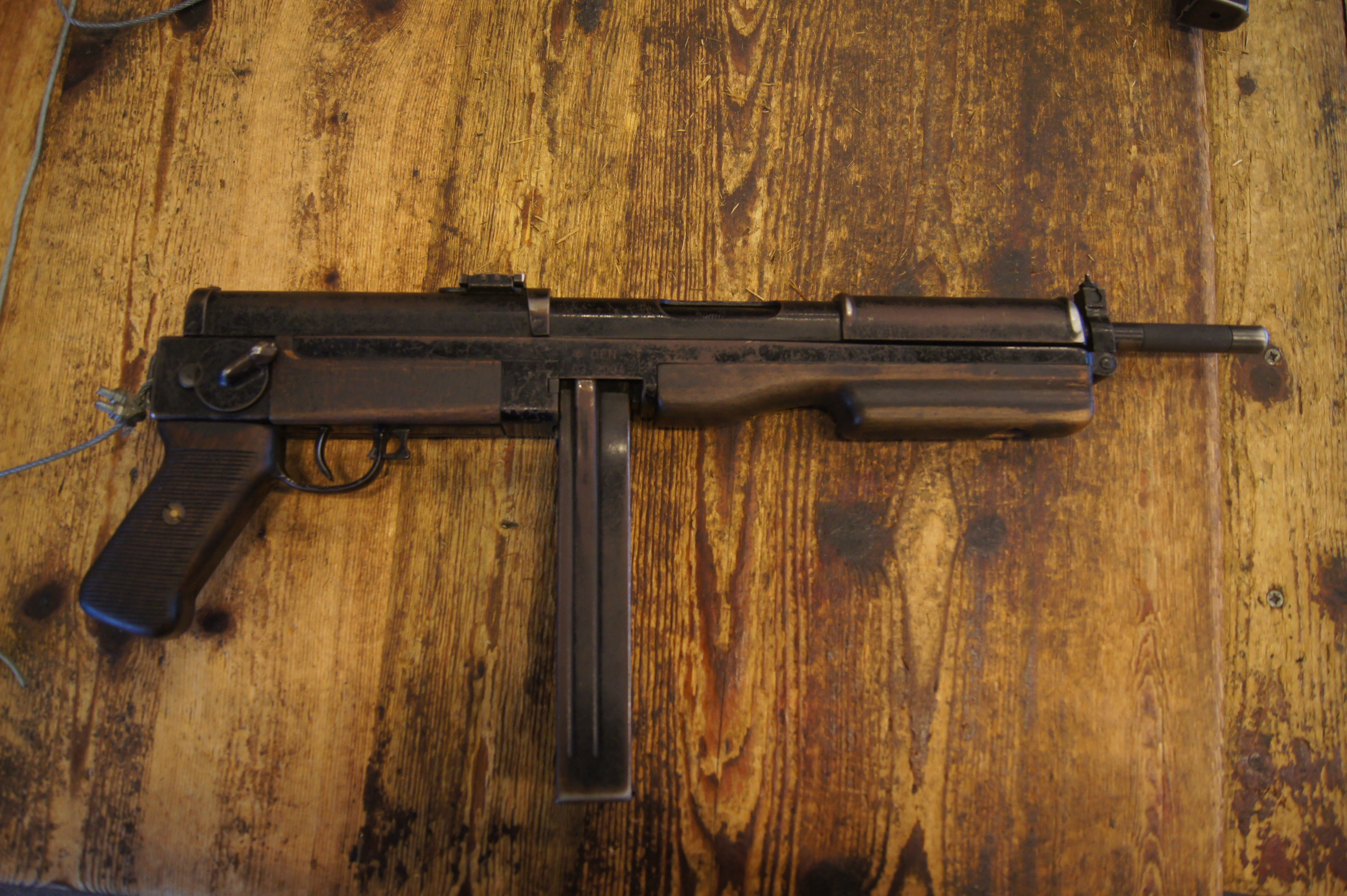
- Madsen M1945 Without the buttstock
- Type: Submachine gun
- Place of origin: Denmark

Service history
- Used by: See Users

Production history
- Designer: Dansk Industri Syndikat
- Designed: 1945
- Manufacturer: Dansk Industri Syndikat

Specifications
- Mass: 3.15 kilograms (6.9 lb)
- Length: 800 millimetres (31 in) Fixed Stock, Folding Stock. 550 millimetres (22 in) Folding Stock retracted
- Caliber: 9×19mm Parabellum
- Action: Blowback
- Rate of fire: 850 rounds/min
- Feed system: Magazine 50 round casket magazine
- Sights: Fixed Front sight and folding rear sights set for 100 m (110 yd) and 200 m (220 yd)

The Madsen M1945 or M45 is a submachine gun introduced in 1945. It was produced by the Danish company Dansk Industri Syndikat of Copenhagen, Denmark. The Madsen M1945 was only produced for a short period of time before being replaced in production by the Madsen M1946 which was simpler and more inexpensive to produce compared to the Madsen M1945. The latter used older more expensive methods of manufacturing, included the milling and machining of steel and the use of wood as opposed to the simpler, more modern techniques of stamping and welding.

== Overview ==
The Madsen M1945 is a 9mm submachine gun that fires from the open bolt and only in fully automatic. It feeds from 50-round casket-type magazines similar to the Finnish Suomi submachine gun of WW2. The design of the M45 is unusual as the breechblock is attached to a slide cover and not a charging handle. The slide cover extends over the barrel and has serrations at the front. The entire "slide" must be cocked back and pulled to the rear, making the submachine gun similar in function to a giant automatic pistol. The mass of the slide keeps the rate of fire down but interferes with aim (the sights are on the "slide") and weakens the spring over time due to the spring being confined in the slide and wrapped around the barrel.

== Users ==
- Bolivia
- El Salvador
- Mexico
