= Dragør Fort =

Danish coastal fortification south of Copenhagen, Denmark

The entrance to Fort Dragor today.

Fort Dragor, also called Dragor Fort, is a Danish fortification located on an artificial island outside Copenhagen harbor, Copenhagen, Denmark. The fort was constructed in the early 1900s, and was meant to augment the defenses of Copenhagen. The fort served the Danish military until 2001, when it was decommissioned and bought by a private individual.

== Armament ==
The entire armament of Fort Dragor was outside in open-air barbettes.

Armament in 1915

- 4 355mm howitzers
- 4 170mm howitzers
- 4 120mm QF steel cannons
- 2 75mm QF steel Anti-Aircraft (AA) guns on pivots
- 1 47mm cannon
- 34 8mm machine guns
  1 of the 75mm AA gun barbettes today.

Armament in 1957

- 3 40mm twin-barreled Bofors anti-aircraft guns on open-air barbettes

Armament in 1984

- 3 40mm twin-barreled Bofors anti-aircraft guns on open-air barbettes
- 2 76mm (3in) anti-aircraft guns

== Description ==
2 of the 170mm Howitzer barbettes.

Fort Dragor was constructed 400m south of the town of Dragør, which is south of Copenhagen and west of Malmö, Sweden. The entire fort is surrounded by a moat. The fort’s guns mainly fired south, to prevent a foreign navy from bombarding Copenhagen from the Baltic side. Judging by the dates when the fort was constructed, 1910 to 1915, the fort was constructed to stop the German Navy, the main naval force on the Baltic at the time, from exiting the Baltic. The main purpose of the fort was to protect Copenhagen from bombardment, protect the minefields from minesweepers, and protect the island of Amager from an amphibious landing. The fort was built with its own power generator in case the power grid in Copenhagen got knocked out. The fort is 32,000 sq ft, with only 2,500 sq ft above ground. The fort’s crew was 380 men, including the infantrymen who guarded the fort against a ground assault. The fort is a polygonal shape, and is a trapezoidal shape. 3 out of the 4 corners had a steel-concrete caponier, which were armed with 2 machine guns each. Each of the 120mm guns was emplaced on each corner of the fort. On the top of the fort were several positions for range-finders and ammo depots constructed deep in the fort. Most of the fort was covered by earth as protection against artillery shells. The fort bears many traces of its use by the occupying Germans in the 1940s, such as two-piece armored doors.

=== History ===
Fort Dragor was constructed between 1910 and 1915, and was built on an artificial trapezoidal island outside of the town of Dragor. The fort was garrisoned through World War I, to keep the German Baltic Fleet from sailing into the North Sea. After the war, the fort was only periodically used until the outbreak of war in Sept. 1939. When Germany invaded Poland in Sept. 1939, the Danish reoccupied the fort as a precaution. When Germany invaded Denmark on April 9, 1940, the fort didn’t play any role in stopping the invasion. The Germans occupied Fort Dragor as a shooting range and naval fortification. The Germans partially renovated the fort, since the Danish hadn’t since it was built. The Germans also used the fort as part of their defenses of Copenhagen. After Germany’s capitulation in May 1945, the Danish reoccupied the fort but soon abandoned it. The fort came back into use in 1957, as the Cold War was nearing its closest to war. Danish authorities installed a radar dish, and the fort became a radar station. They removed the cannons from 1915, and replaced them with 3 twin-barreled 40mm Bofors AA guns. In 1980, Danish authorities added 2 76mm AA guns to augment the guns from 1957. In 2001, 10 years after the fall of the Soviet Union, Fort Dragor was decommissioned. The fort had served for 86 years. In 2001, the fort was bought by a private individual and turned into a restaurant and hotel, which is what it remains today During their renovation of the fort’s grounds, they removed most traces of the 355mm howitzers.

== See also ==
- Flakfortet
- Middelgrundsfortet
- Fort Stevns
