= Trekroner Fort =

Sea fort in Copenhagen, Denmark

Coordinates: 55°42′11″N 12°36′52″E

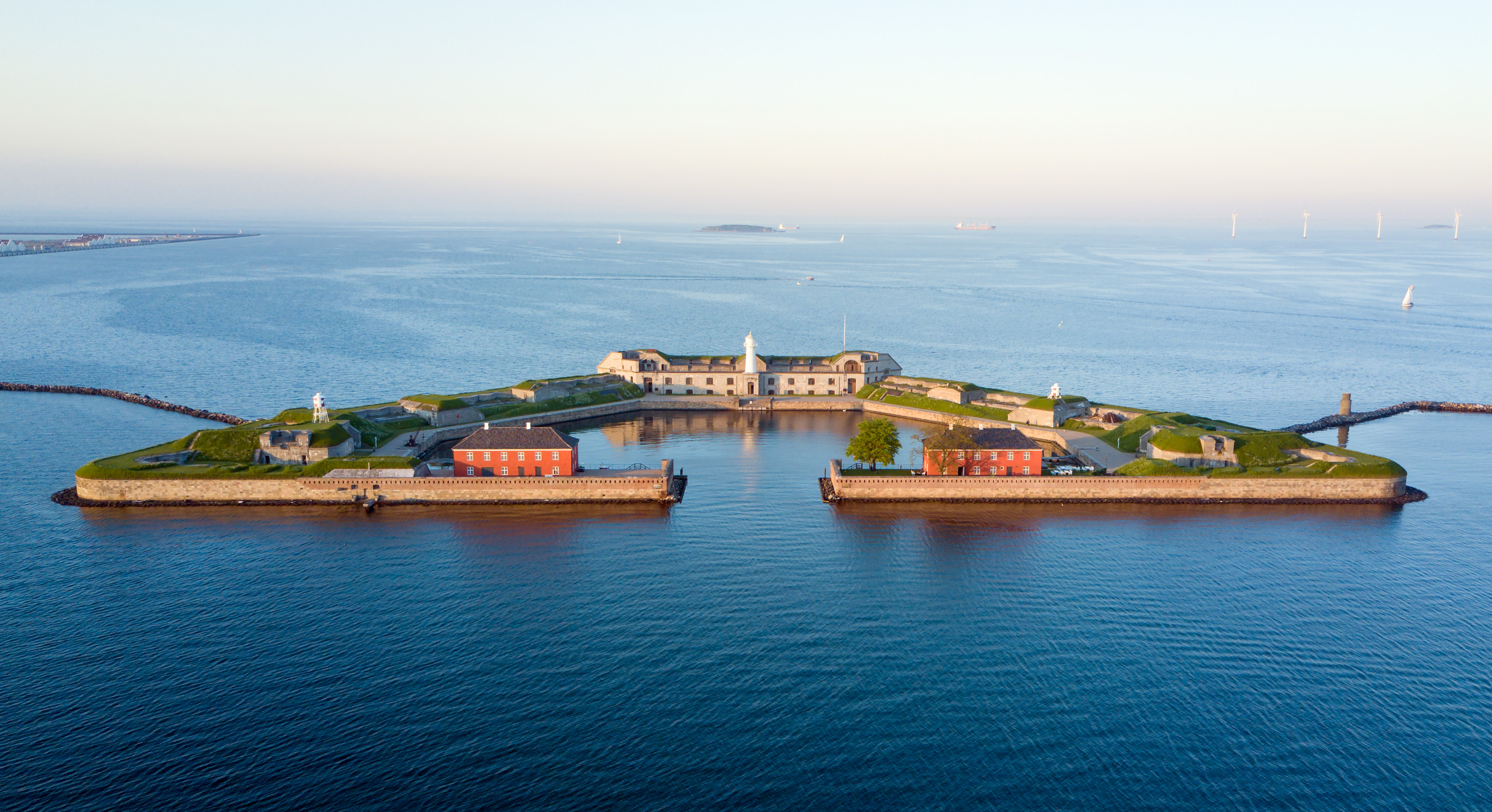
Trekroner

Trekroner Søfort (literally Three Crowns Sea Fortress) is a sea fort at the entrance to the Copenhagen harbour. From 1713 until after World War I, Trekroner Fort was part of the fortifications of Copenhagen.

The original location of Trekroner Fort was a few hundred meters north of the current one. In 1713, three old ships of the line were sunk to form the basis for a battery. One of the ships was called Trekroner, and she gave her name to the fort.

Construction of the current fort began in 1787. The fort was an important part of the Danish line of defense during the Battle of Copenhagen in 1801. The fort also was engaged during the British attack on Copenhagen in 1807.

From 1818 to 1828 and in 1860, the fort was strongly enhanced, but its military significance diminished after the First World War. In 1934 it was sold to the Copenhagen harbour services. During the German occupation of Denmark the Germans used the fortress as a barracks. After the war it was used for a few years as a prison for German officers and the former German ambassador to Denmark. Afterwards, it fell vacant until 1984, when it was opened to the public.

Trekroner Fort is one of three artificial islands that were created to defend the entrance to Copenhagen's harbor (the other two are Middelgrundsfortet and Flakfortet).

== Cultural references ==
Trekroner is seen, as a ferry with Hallandsen onboard passes by, at 0:31:20 in the 1977 Olsen-banden film The Olsen Gang Outta Sight.

== See also ==
- Prøvestenen, Copenhagen
