= Garderhøj Fort =

Coordinates: 55°45′56″N 12°31′37″E

The Garderhøj Fort (Danish: Garderhøjfortet) is a Danish fortification, and was part of Copenhagen's fortifications.

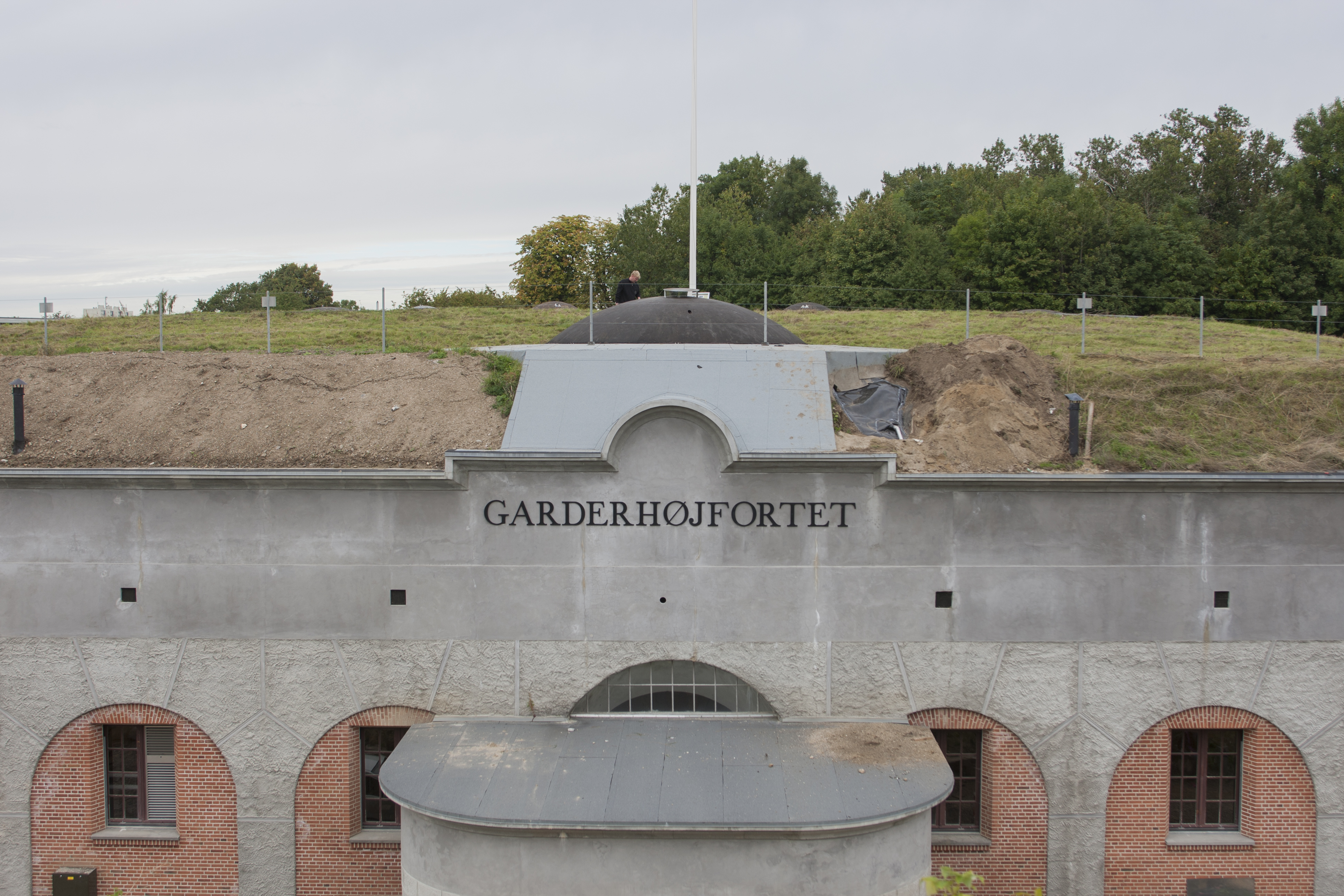
Facade of the fort.

== History ==
The fort was built between 1886 and 1892 with private funding and designed by Lieutenant colonel E.J. Sommerfeldt. Upon completion, the fort was then leased to the War ministry. The ministry on its part, gave E.J. Sommerfeldt control over the fort. Construction costs were 1.5 million Danish Crowns. The fort was in use by the Defence ministry until 1920, when it was closed and control was handed back to the private funders. In 1921, the fort was leased again by the ministry, this time to be used as an ammunition depot and as a training ground for police and military.

In 1996, the fort was given to the Danish people, and an organization was set up to restore the fort and allow it to open to the public. The fort was in poor state at the handover, being badly maintained and plagued by moisture that penetrated through walls and ceilings. With financial support from Realdania, the Ministry of Culture and the Ministry of Environment the fort was restored between 1996 and 2013.

The fort reopened officially on 27 September 2013.

== Armament ==
The fortification was equipped with a variety of turrets and guns. It was therefore also used as a training ground. Fixed towers as well as 'disappearing towers' (forsvindingstårne) were placed at the fort. The disappearing towers could be stored almost entirely below ground level, hence the name. The downside of these towers was their limited size and reduced armor.

The largest guns at the fort were two 15 centimetres (5.9 in) iron cannons, manufactured in 1887 in Sweden, and fitted in an armoured tower. The tower in which they are fitted is the highest tower of the fort. The weight of the moving part of the tower is 100 ton and the entire tower with armour weighs 200 ton.

Two French-made 'disappearing towers' were placed on the outer sides and housed one 75 mm gun each. Each towers weighs 19 tons and has a 15-ton counterweight. To move the tower upwards, a 550 kg weight was added to the counterweights.

== Gallery ==
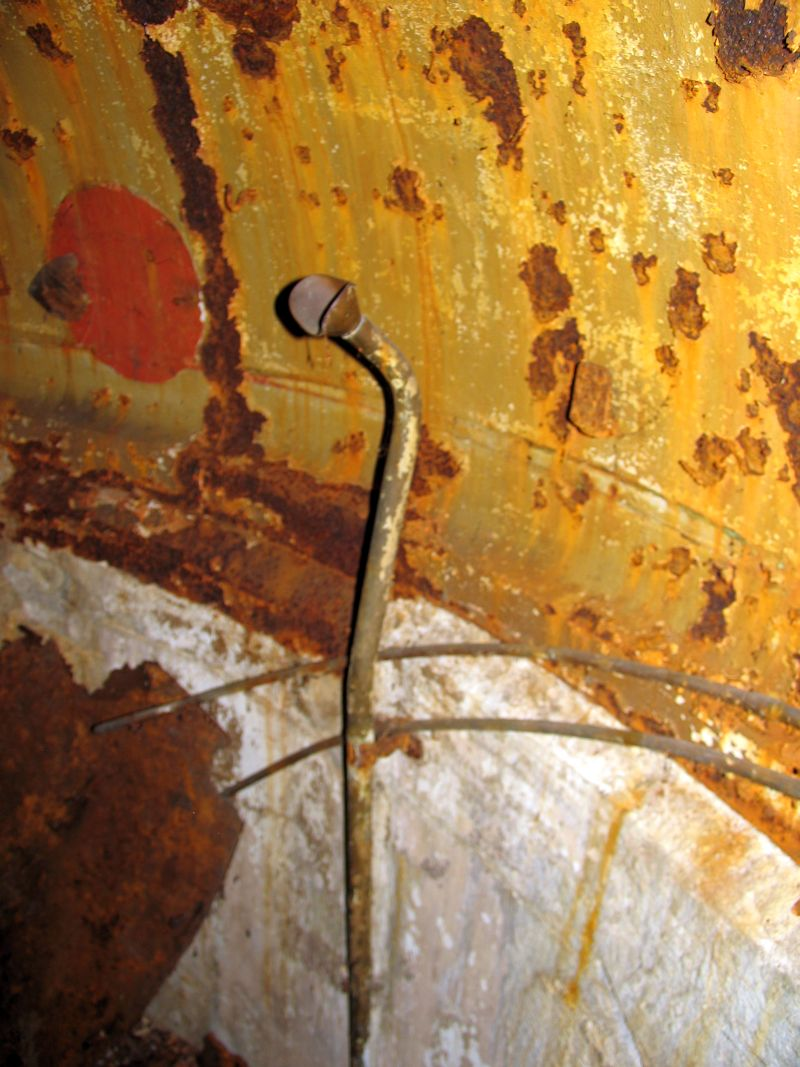
Intercom from the storage area to a turret tower.

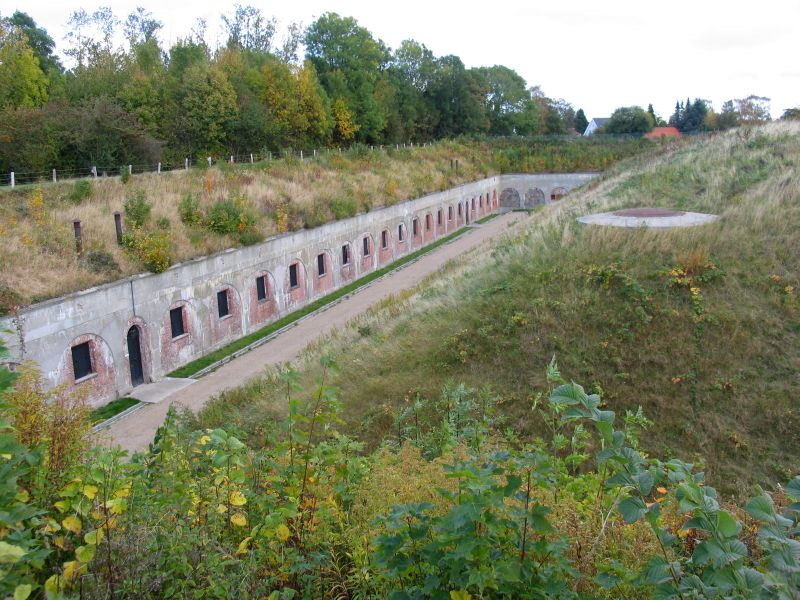
Barracks for infantry

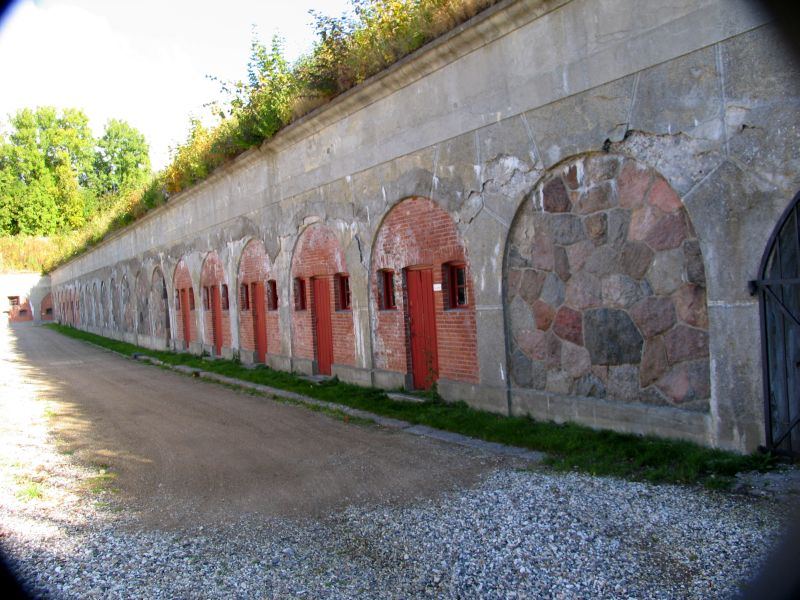

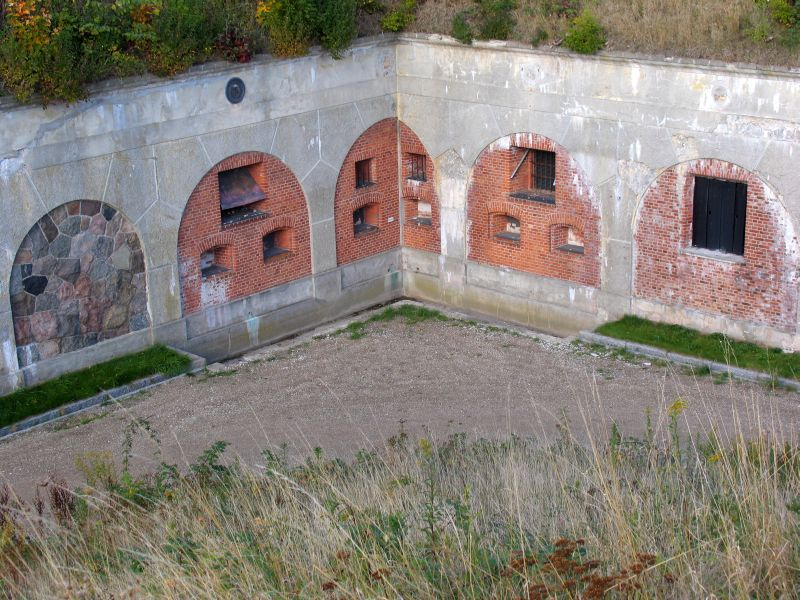

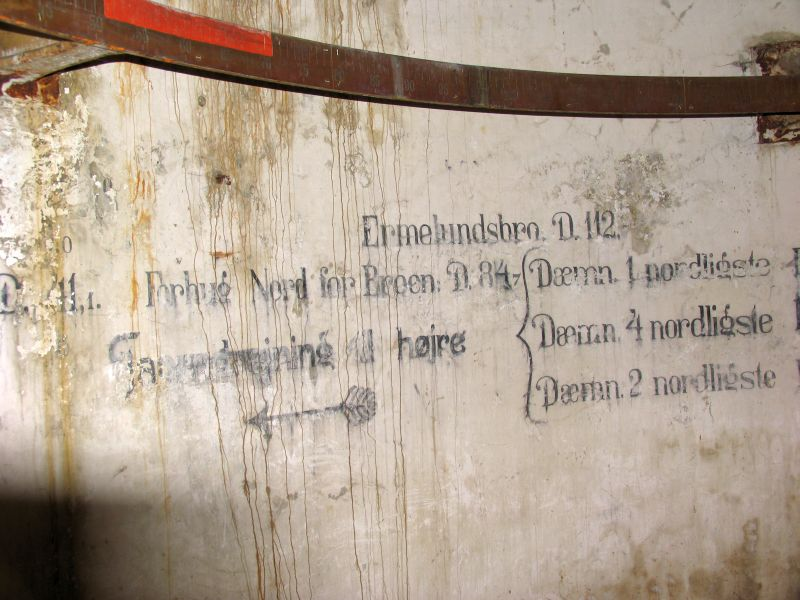
The shooting scheme in an armoured tower

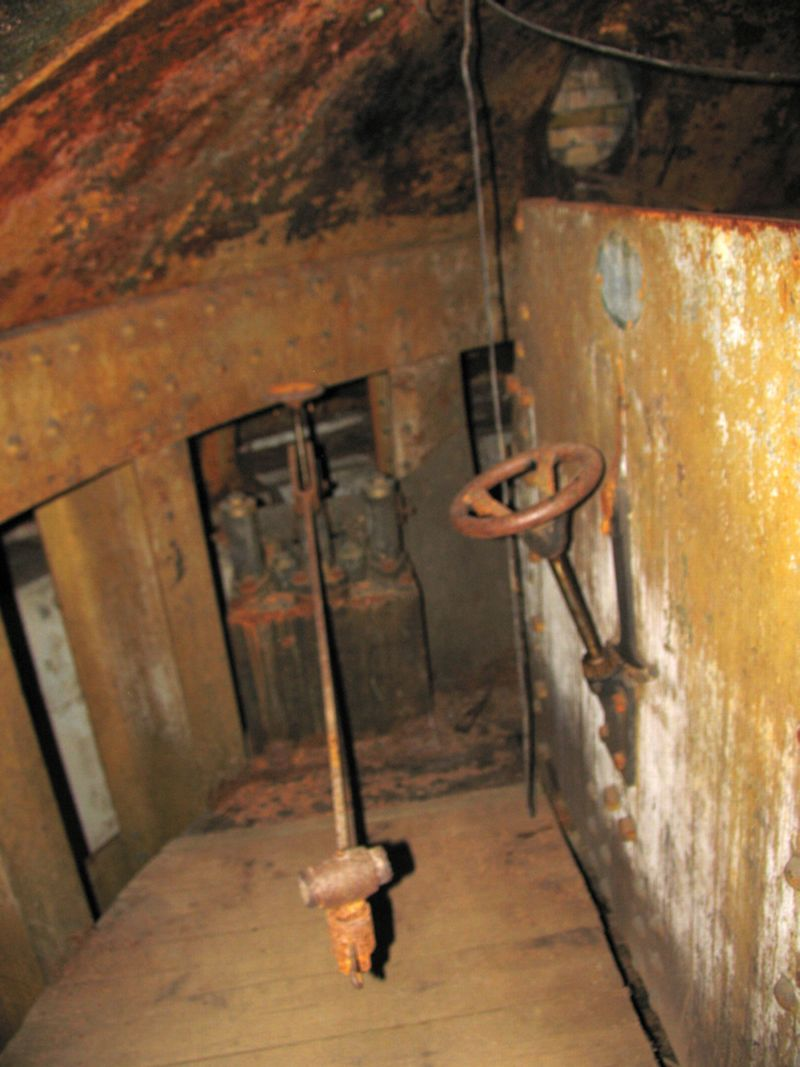
Controls in an armoured tower

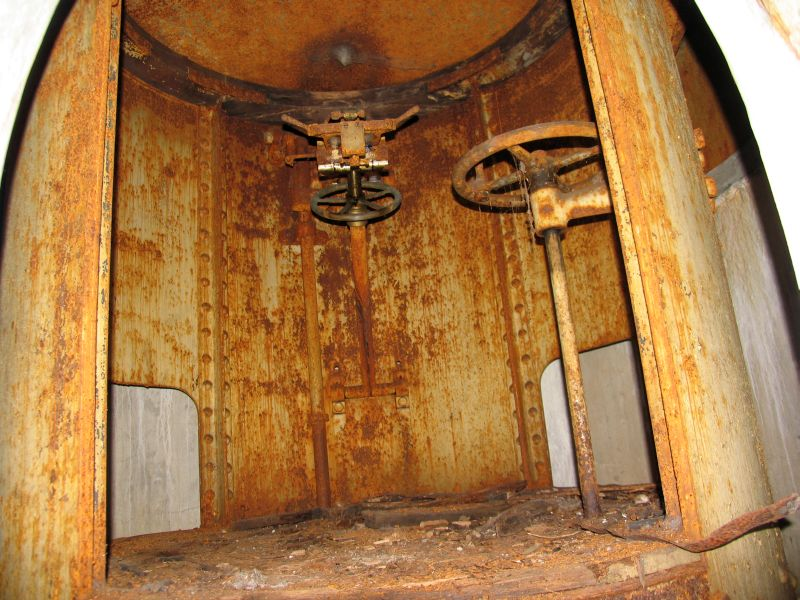
Retractable tower for 10 mm mitrallieuse

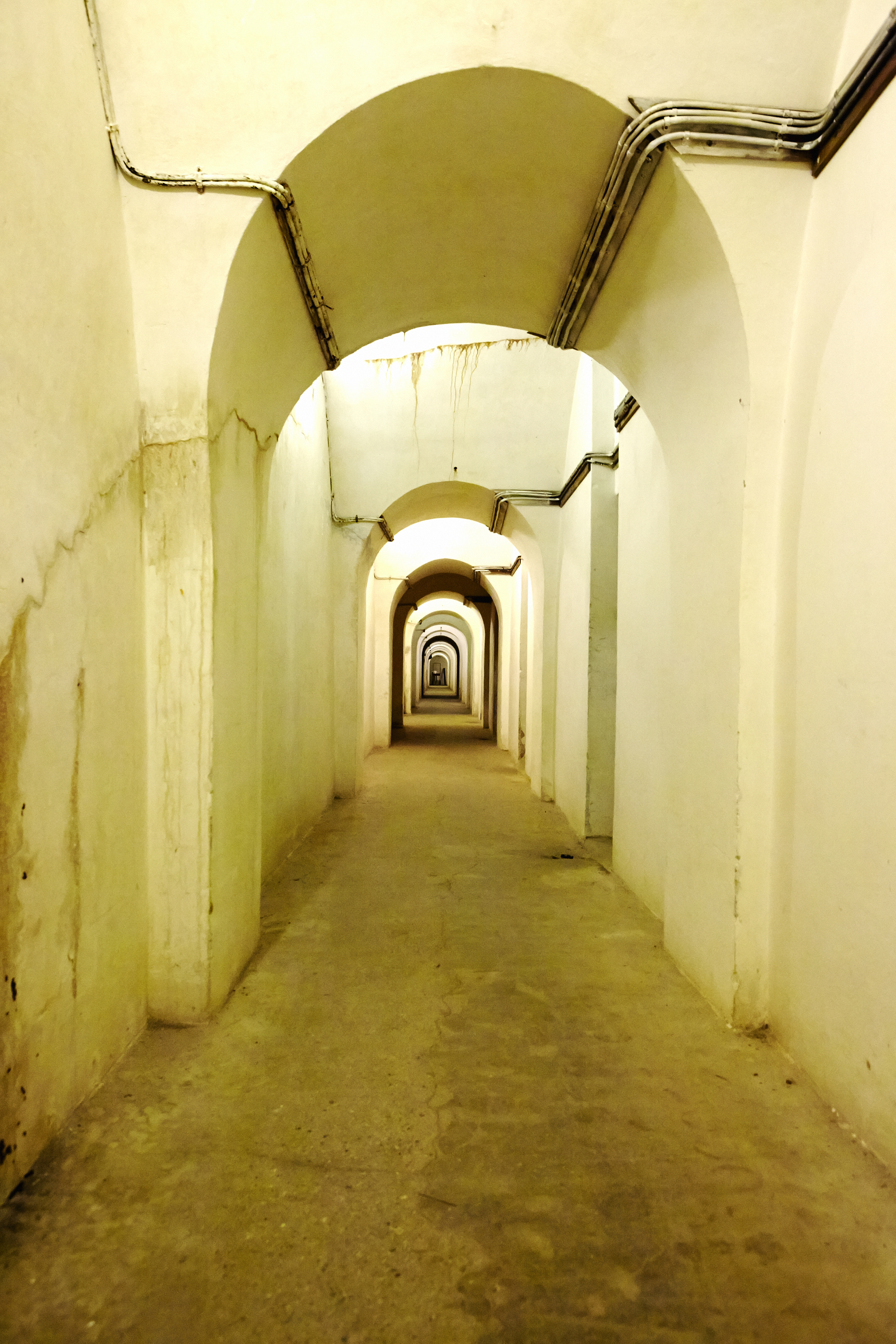
Corridor in the barracks

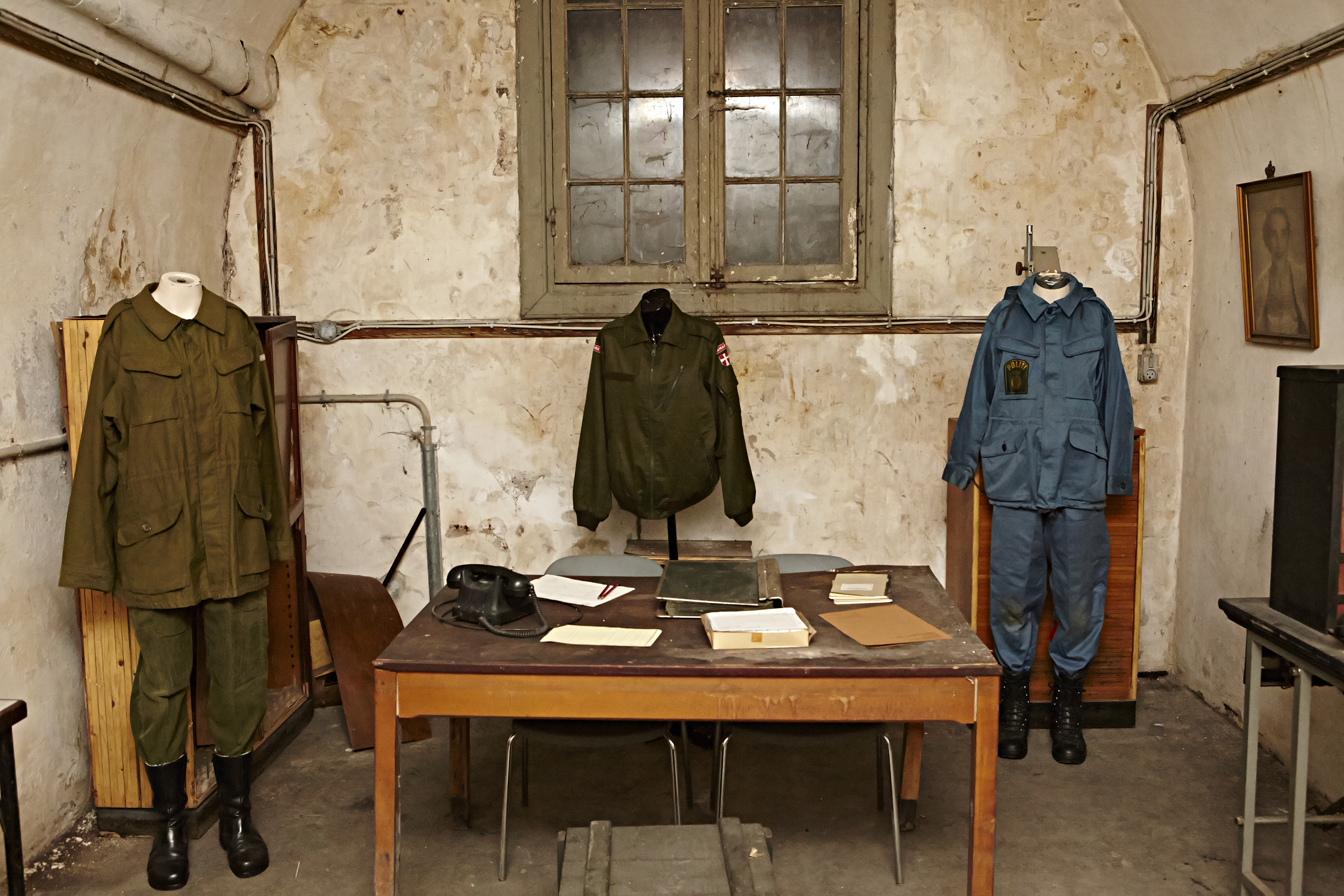
Office in the barracks. The barracks were used during the Cold War.

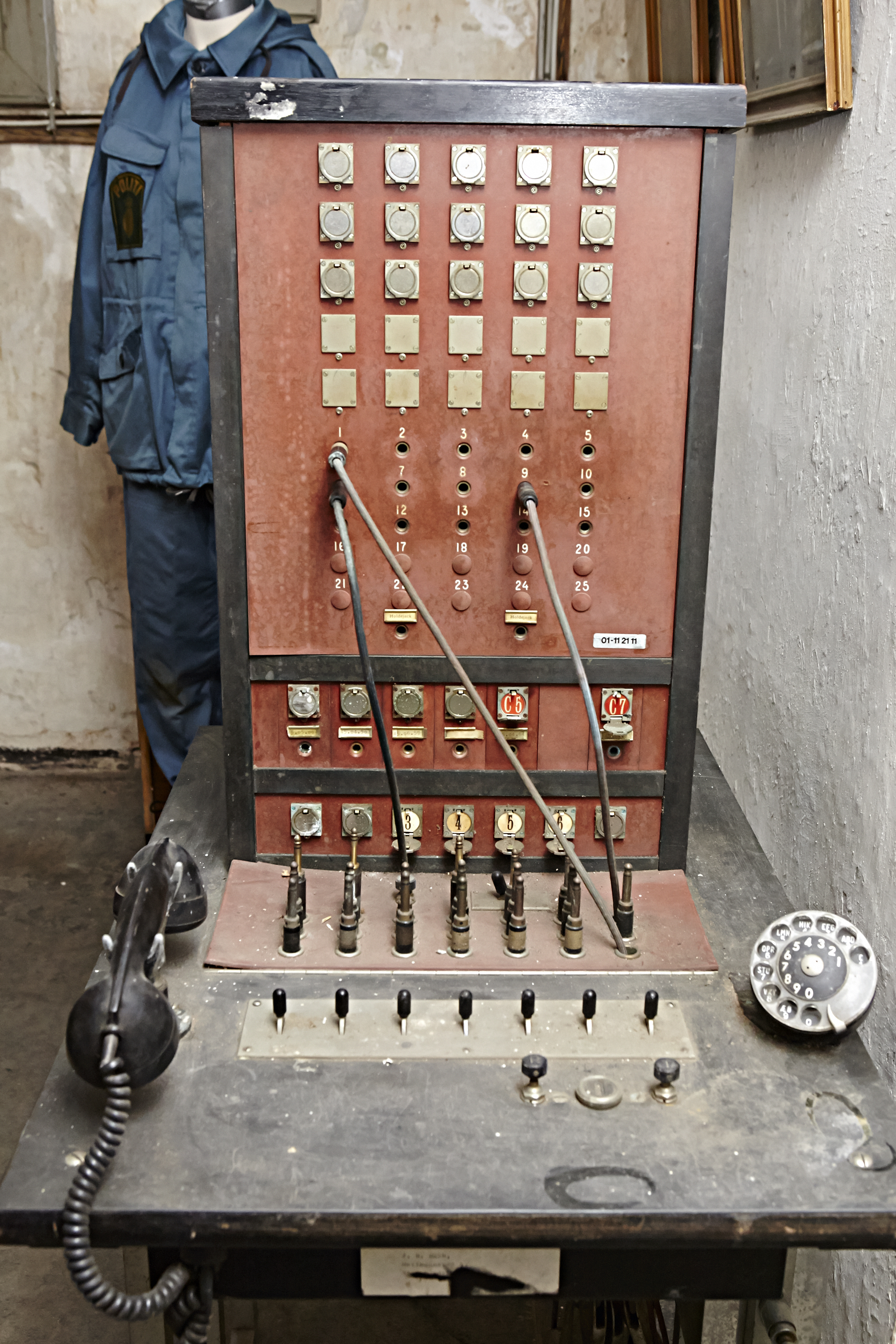
Phone system in the office.

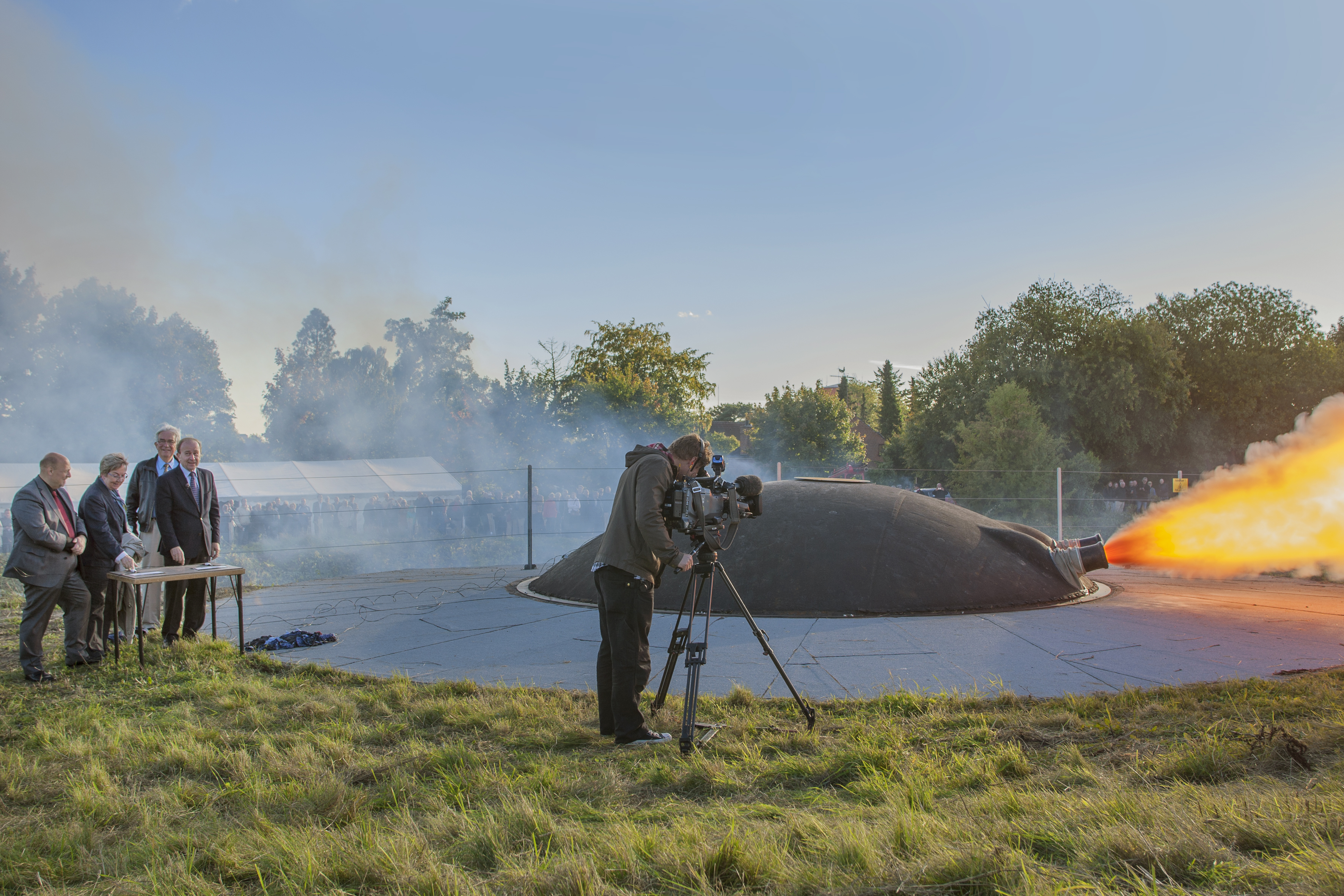
Firing of double cannons during the reopening on 27 September 2013.
