= A. P. Møller and Chastine Mc-Kinney Møller Foundation =

Nonprofit organization in Copenhagen, Denmark

The A.P. Møller and Chastine Mc-Kinney Møller Foundation (Danish: A. P. Møller og Hustru Chastine Mc-Kinney Møllers Fond til almene Formaal, lit. 'A. P. Møller and wife Chastine Mc-Kinney Møller's Foundation for general purposes') is a Danish foundation which was founded by A. P. Møller in 1953.

== The fund supports ==
- Danish culture in Southern Jutland north and south of the border
- Cooperation and cultural collaboration between Denmark and the Scandinavian countries
- Danish seafarers with support for education, churches, and sailor's homes
- Danish shipping and industry
- Scientific purposes, especially medical science and mainly in new acquisitions
- Charity

== Examples of donations ==
- 1983 Development of Amaliehaven
- 1989 Renovation of Kastellet, Copenhagen
- 1997 Renovation of Frederik V on Horseback in Amalienborg castle square
- 2004 Copenhagen Opera House
- 2011 Inderhavnsbroen between Havnegade in Nyhavn and Grønlandske Handels Plads
- 2015 Purchase of Middelgrundsfortet for the creation of Ungdomsøen Youth Island by Danish Scout organisations
