= Madsen M47 =

- Type: Bolt-action rifle
- Place of origin: Denmark

Service history
- Used by: Denmark; Colombia

Production history
- Designer: Compagnie Madsen, A/S
- Designed: 1947
- Manufacturer: Dansk Industri Syndikat
- Produced: 1958
- No. built: approx. 6,000

Specifications
- Mass: 8.5 lb (3.9 kg)
- Length: 43 in (1,100 mm)
- Barrel length: 23.4 in (590 mm)
- Cartridge: .30-06 Springfield
- Action: Bolt-action
- Feed system: 5-round stripper clip, internal box magazine
- Sights: Adjustable iron sights

The Madsen Lightweight Military Rifle (or the Madsen Lightweight Military Rifle Model 1947; commonly abbreviated as M47) is a Danish bolt-action rifle designed to be chambered for a wide range of contemporary military cartridges. The M47 was the last bolt-action rifle designed with the intention of being general issue to infantry troops. The M47 was first available for purchase in 1951, primarily marketed to countries which could not afford semi-automatic rifles for their militaries. However, with the unprecedented availability of low-cost surplus small arms and the rapid proliferation of self-loading rifles after World War II, global demand for such a rifle was very low and the M47 received very little commercial interest.

== History ==
Designed by Madsen in 1947, the M47 rifle was billed as a lightweight, robust, easy-to-use individual infantry weapon. Madsen is only known to have received one production contract from Colombia in 1958, which included up to 6,000 standard-length rifles chambered in .30-06 Springfield and featuring a 5-round internal magazine, along with knife bayonets. These rifles are not known to have been issued outside of ceremonial use, and were instead stored as surplus until their purchase and export to the United States for consumer sale in the 1960s.

== Features ==
When first marketed in 1951, Madsen offered several options with the rifle including a lightweight carbine version; telescopic sights; 5- and 10-round magazine capacities; and a variety of chamberings in contemporary military service cartridges, which would eventually include 7.62×51mm NATO. Standard features included a muzzle brake integrated into the barrel, a thick rubber buttpad, and a windage-adjustable sliding tangent rear sight assembly with a ghost ring aperture forward of the action.

== Users ==
=== Former users ===
- Denmark
- Colombia
