= Madsen M-50 =

Madsen Model 1950
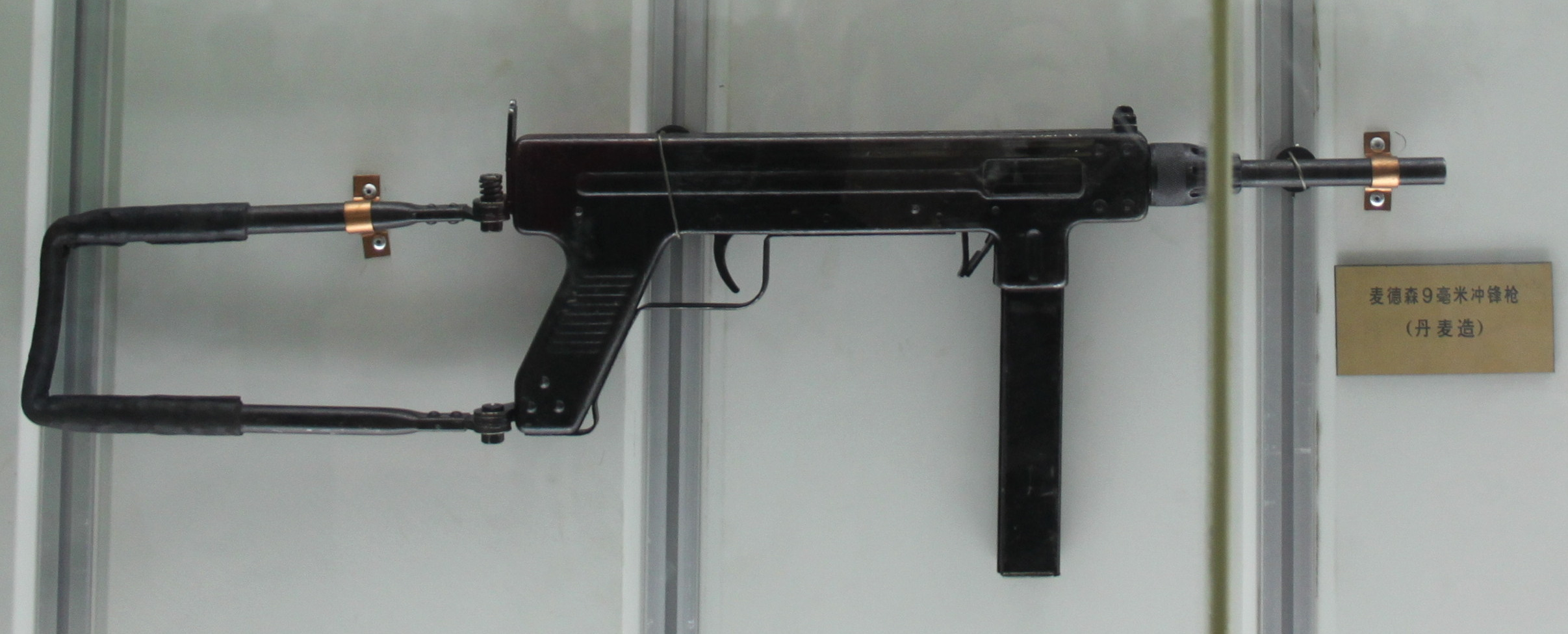
- Madsen M-50
- Type: Submachine gun
- Place of origin: Denmark

Service history
- In service: 1950–1980s
- Used by: See Users
- Wars: First Indochina War; Indonesian National Revolution; Korean War; Malayan Emergency; Vietnam War; Salvadoran Civil War; The Troubles; Colombian Civil War; Araguaia Guerrilla War; Insurgency in Aceh

Production history
- Designer: Dansk Industri Syndikat
- Designed: 1950
- Manufacturer: Dansk Industri Syndikat
- Variants: M/46, M/53

Specifications
- Mass: 3.15 kilograms (6.9 lb)
- Length: 795 millimetres (31.3 in) with stock open
- Caliber: 9×19mm Parabellum
- Action: Blowback
- Rate of fire: 550 rounds/min
- Muzzle velocity: 380 m/s (1,200 ft/s)
- Feed system: Magazine 32 rounds
- Sights: Single aperature set for 100 m (110 yd)

The Madsen M-50 or M/50 is a submachine gun introduced in 1950. It was produced by the Danish company Dansk Industri Syndikat of Copenhagen, Denmark.

== Overview ==
This firearm was a modified variation of the M/46. The only major improvement was the simplified retracting handle. Introduction of the M/50 occurred at Mosede Fort, from 7 November 1950, until 1953.

The M/50 is made of stamped sheet metal. It is an open bolt design. The M/46 and M/50 share a unique design: the firearm is stamped from two pieces of sheet metal which are shaped with an integral rear pistol grip and magazine housing. The two pieces fit together like a clam shell with the hinge at the rear of the pistol grip. The firearm is held together with a barrel locking nut which is threaded onto the fore section of the two receiver halves. The pistol grip is hollow, providing storage space for a magazine loading tool.

The folding stock is made of tubular steel covered with leather and folds onto the right side of the firearm. The M/50 fires in full-auto only. It also features a safety lever (also known as grip safety), unusually placed in front of the forward magazine housing. To fire the M/50 the operator must grip the magazine housing and hold down the safety lever.

== Users ==
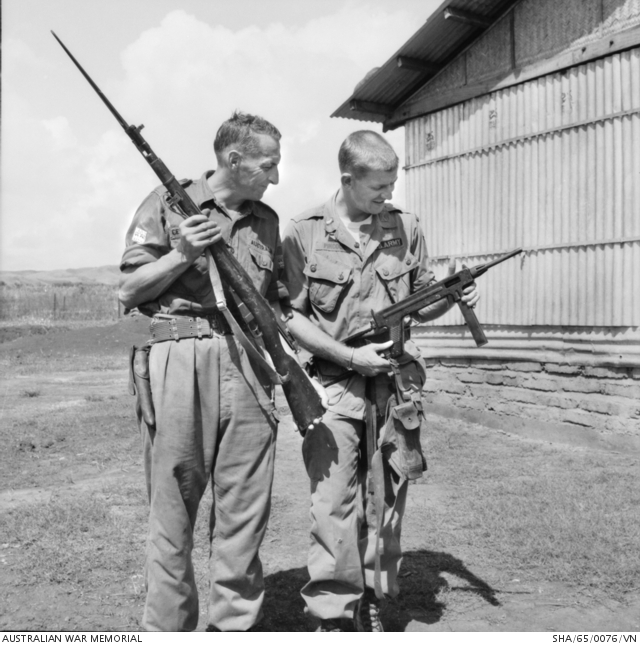
A U.S. Army soldier (right) holds a captured Vietcong M-50 in 1965

- Argentina
- Bolivia
- Brazil (produced under license as the INA Model 953 in .45 ACP)
- Chile
- Colombia
- Denmark
- El Salvador
- Guatemala
- Indonesia
- North Vietnam
- Nicaragua
- Paraguay
- South Vietnam
- Thailand
- Taiwan
- United Kingdom: the M-50 underwent intensive trials in 1951–1952 against the BSA model 1949 and the Sterling submachine gun. The latter was eventually selected.
- United States In use with Green Berets serving alongside Montagnards in MIKE Force units
- Venezuela

Non State Users

- Malayan Communist Party
- Brazilian Communist Party
- Ação Libertadora Nacional
- Ulster Defence Association
- Red Hand Commando
- Loyalist Volunteer Force
- Vanguarda Armada Revolucionaria Palmares
- Italian Mafia - large quantities of Madsen M-50s sold to various Italian Mafia crime families through the black market.
- Yakuza - large quantities of Madsen M-50s sold to various Japanese Yakuza clans through the black market.
