= Prøvestenen, Copenhagen =

Artificial island off Copenhagen, Denmark

Coordinates: 55°40′35″N 12°38′10″E

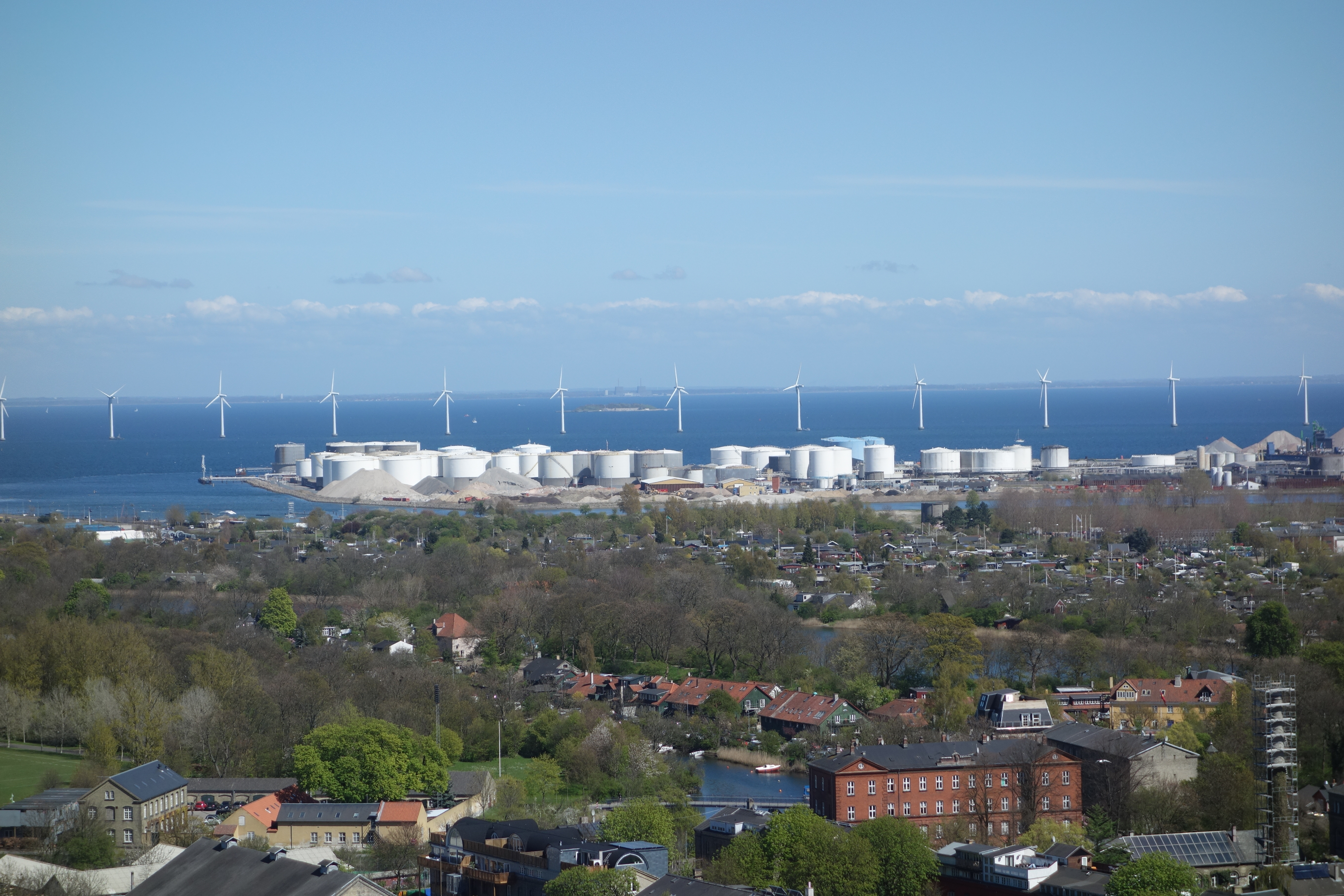
Prøvestenen viewed from the tower of Church of Our Saviour

Prøvestenen, also known as Benzinøen, is an artificial island off the northeast coast of Amager in Copenhagen, Denmark. It is located between the Amager Hill combined incineration plant and ski slope to the north and Amager Strandpark to the south. It was created as a marine fortress to guard the entrance to Copenhagen Harbour in the second half of the 18th century and served military purposes until 1922. It now houses the city's petroleum harbour. Prøvestensbroen at the end of Prags Boulevard links it with the rest of Amager.

== History ==
=== 1st Prøvestenen marine fortress ===
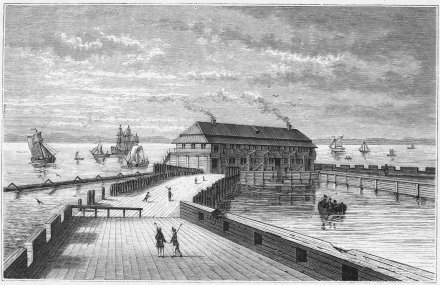
The Prøvestenen Battery

The area traces its history back to 1713 when a marine battery was established at the site by wrecking the floating dock Prøvestenen. The work was led by Ole Judichær. Another marine fortress, Trekroner Fort, was also built at this point. The battery fell into neglect over the following years.

=== 2nd Prøvestenen marine fortress ===
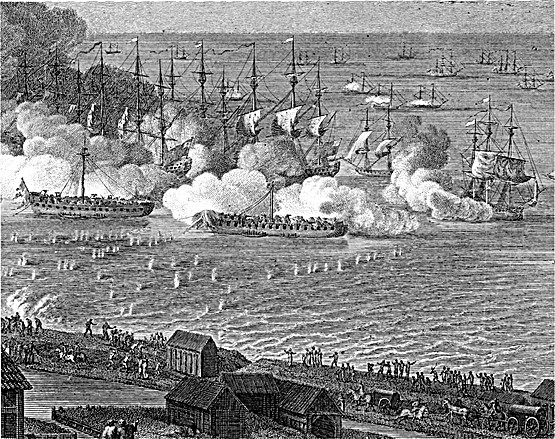
Prøvestenen in the Battle of Copenhagen in 1801

In 1723-24 three more ships were wrecked at the site to expand it but it was once again severely damaged by storms and ice and in 1736. In 1736, it was proposed to decommission it but the plans were never executed and it existed with a single guard until 1767–1767. It played a role in the Battle of Copenhagen in 1801.

In 1802, a new marine fortress with the same name was created a little further to the north by wrecking three ships of the line. In 1809, Adolph Tobias Herbst was pit in charge of the battery, with a number of barges and gunboats under his command.

After the end of the English Wars in 1814, it once again fell into a state of disrepair. It was decommissioned in 1828.

=== 3rd Prøvestenen marine fortress ===
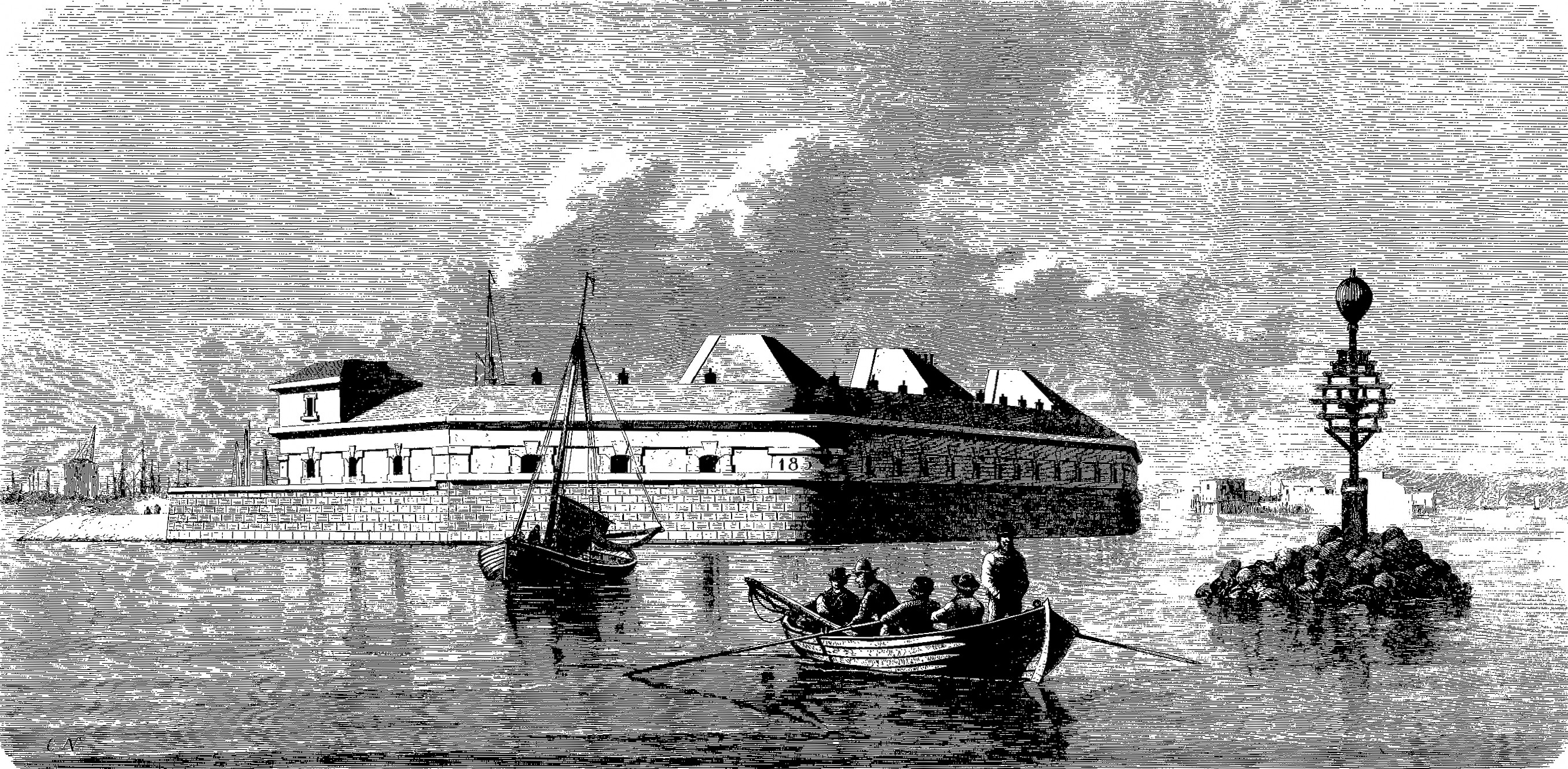
Prøvestenen, circa 1863

A third Prøvestenen Fortress was built at the site in 1859–63 to design by Ferdinand Meldahl. The project was part of an ambitious endeavour to improve Copenhagen's fortifications which also involved the construction of vestvolden and a number of other fortresses.

=== Decommissioning and later history ===
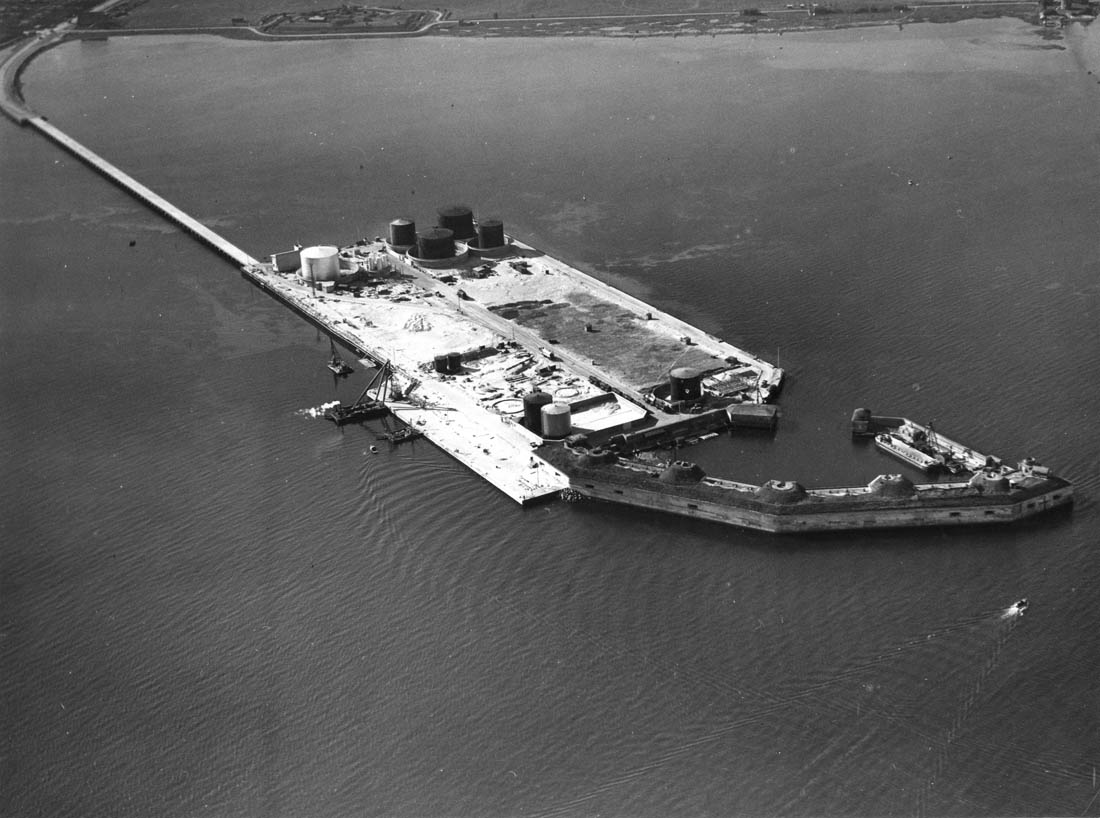
Prøvestenen in the 1930s

The fortress was decommissioned in 1922 and sold to the Royal Danish Navy. It was subsequently converted into a Petroleum Harbour. Copenhagen's Port Authority took over all the former marine fortresses in 1933. Successive Land reclamations increased the area of the island over the next decades. An embankment connecting Prøvestenen to Amager was also built but has later been replaced by a new one.

== Today ==
Prøvestenen is still home to Copenhagen's Petroleum Harbour but much of the capacity is no longer needed following the oil crisis in the 1970s and the discovery of oil and gas in the North Sea.

Remains of Meldahl's fortress are still seen at the site.

Plans for the large new Copenhagen Marina with room for 1,500 boats was put on hold in 2011.
