= Vestvolden =

Rampart complex near Copenhagen, Denmark

Coordinates: 55°40′20″N 12°25′30″E

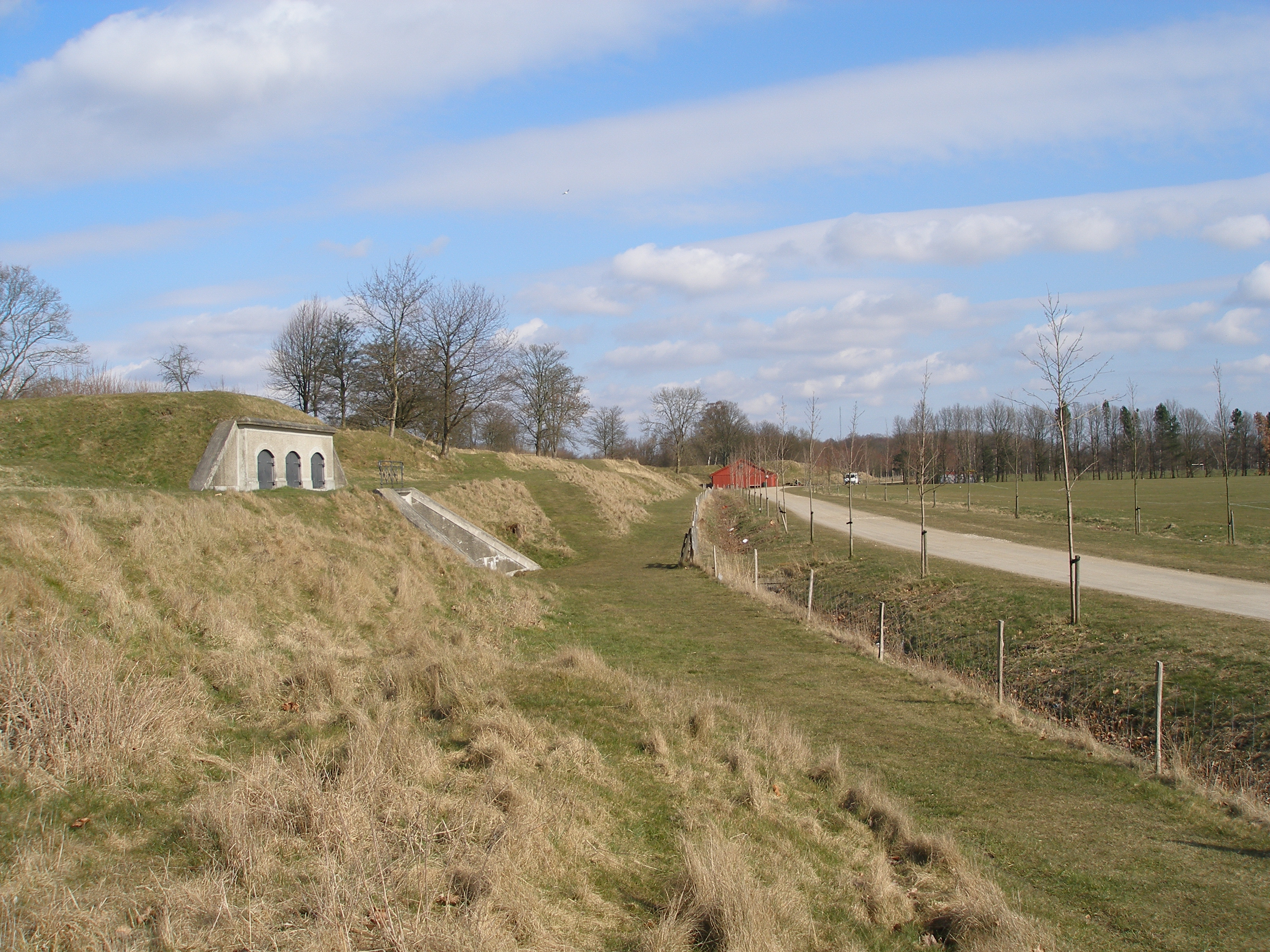
Vestvolden near Rødovre and Brøndby.

Vestvolden (Danish for 'the Western Rampart') is a rampart complex west of Copenhagen, Denmark. Stretching approximately 14 kilometres (9 mi) from Avedøre in the south to Utterslev Mose in the north, it is part of the last generation of land fortifications of the city. Built in the period 1888–1892 by up to 2,000 workers, it was the largest construction project of its time in Denmark. Vestvolden was divided into two fortifications end to end, the southern one named Vestenceinten and the northern, much shorter one named Husumenceinten; the name Vestvolden emerged as an informal collective term for the two. The building of this fortification system began during the so-called "Provisorietiden" (the Provisional Time) 1885–1894 under the Prime Minister who lacked a parliamentary majority but still refused to resign, J.B.S. Estrup. Instead this Prime Minister managed to enforce his annual Financial Laws, by bringing about King Christian IX's support for Provisional Financial Laws. This included support from the so-called Landstinget as well. The Landstinget was a smaller assembly of politicians, of which half of its members were chosen by the Monarch.

Its use as fortification ceased in 1920. However, it continued to be used for military purposes, and was not opened to the public until 1963. Today, it is a recreational area, and has been a protected area since 1993.

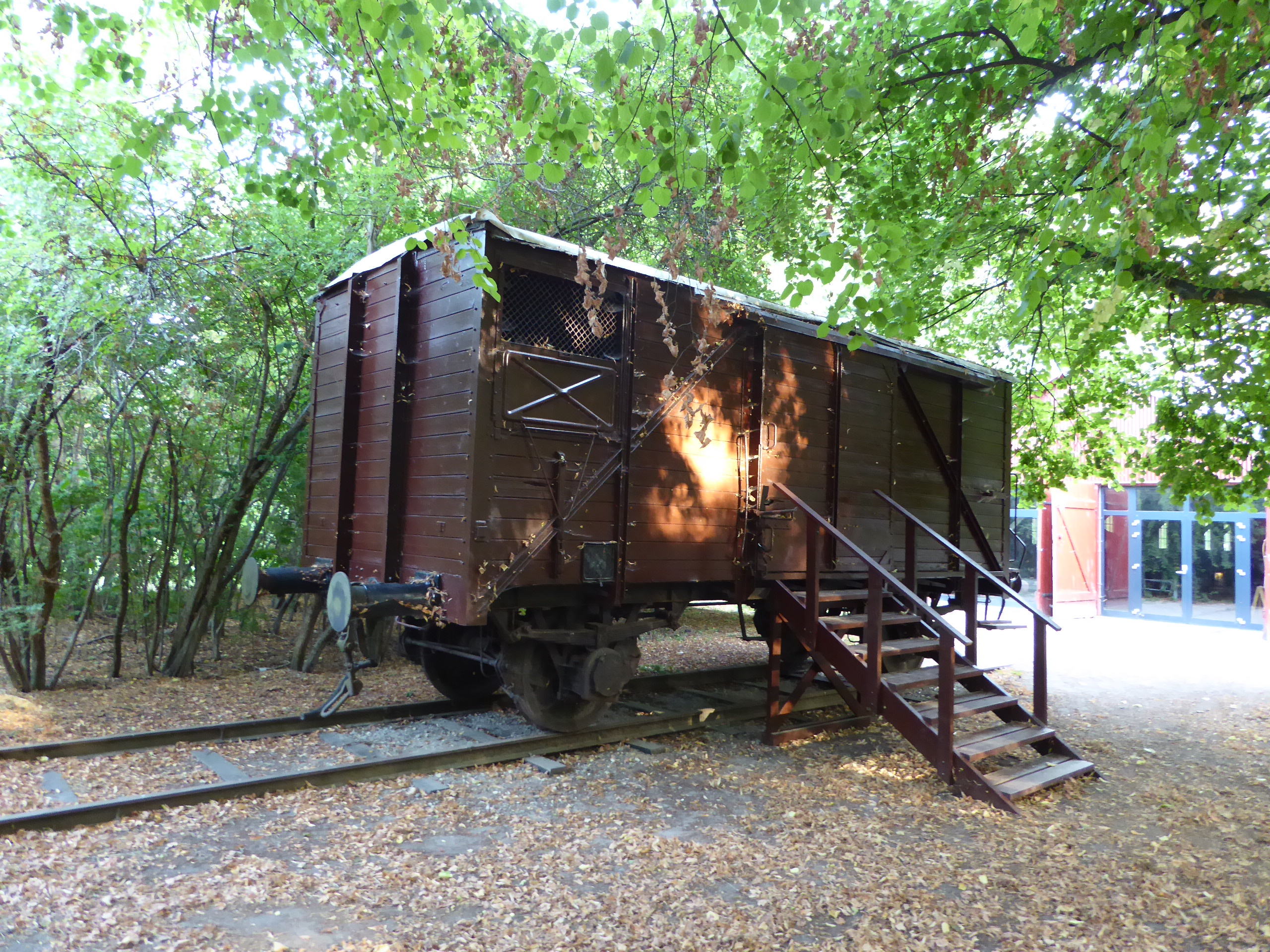

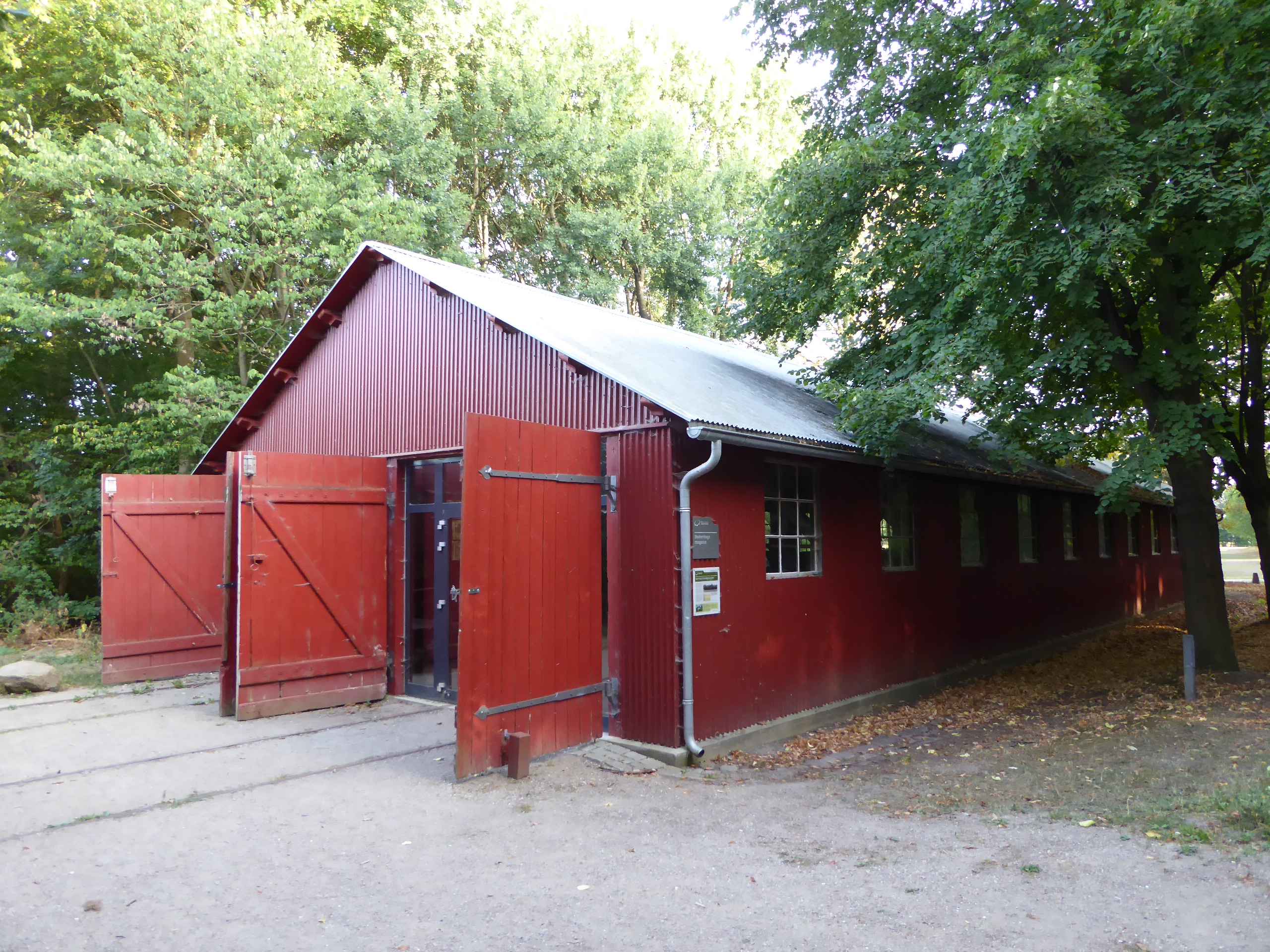

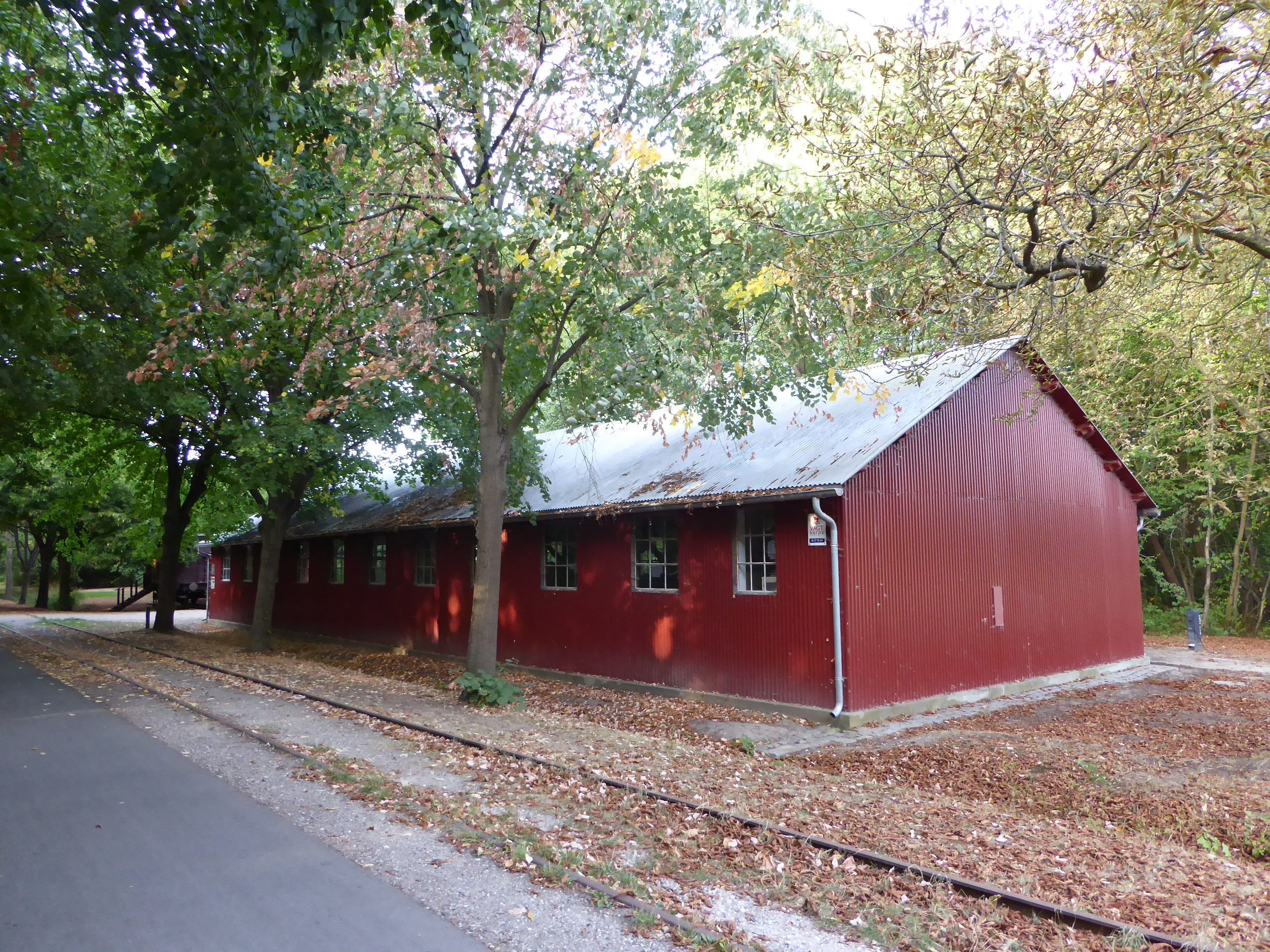

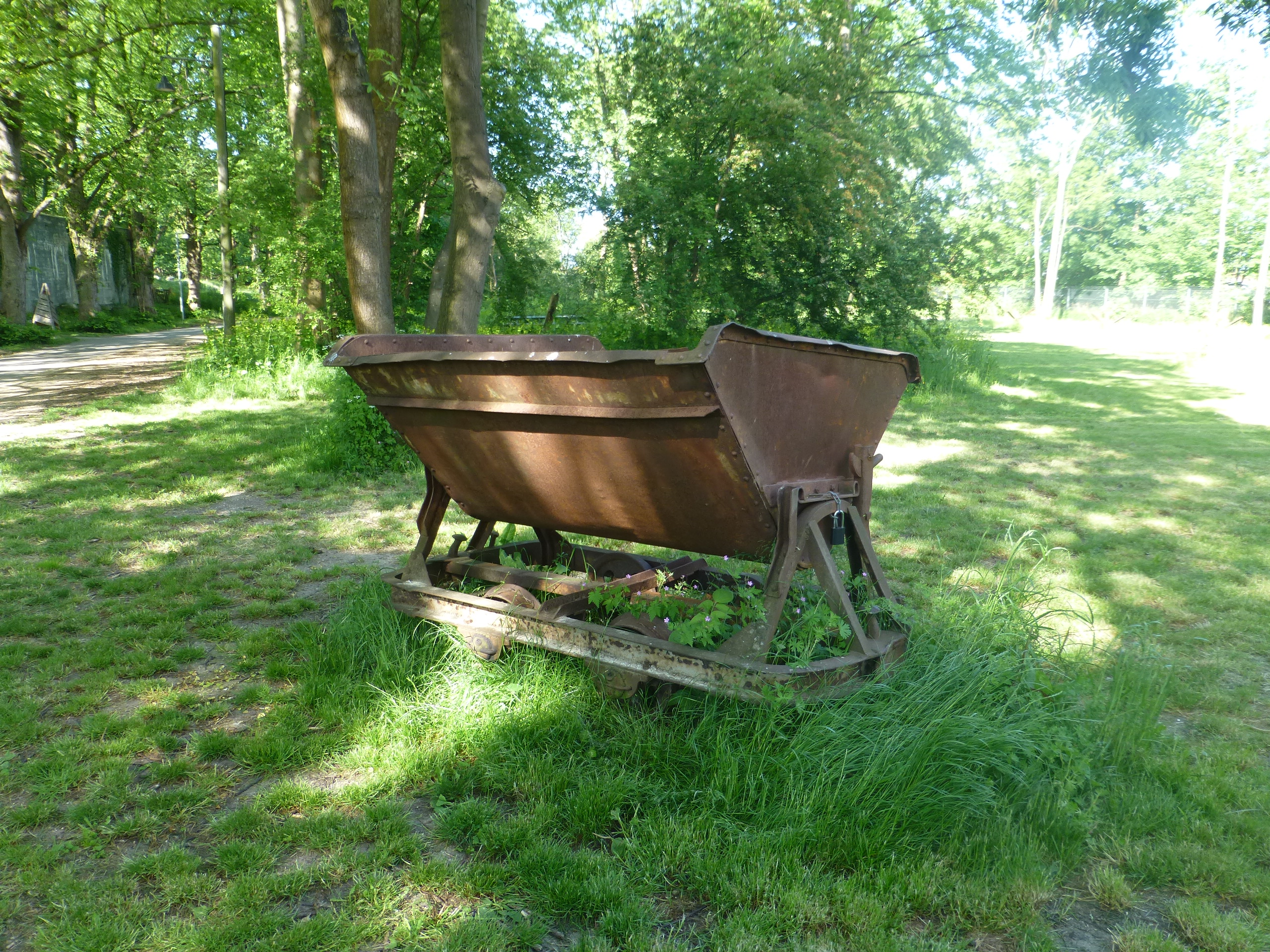
