= DISA (company) =

Danish military technology company

- Company type: Aktieselskab
- Industry: Conglomerate
- Predecessor: Compagnie Madsen A/S
- Founded: 1900
- Headquarters: Taastrup, Denmark
- Area served: Worldwide
- Products: Metal Casting
- Website: Official Website

DISA is a company founded in Denmark (with the name Compagnie Madsen A/S) which since 1900 has produced metal casting products.

In 1936 it changed name from Dansk Rekyl Riffel Syndikat A/S to Dansk Industri Syndikat A/S and was a defence manufacturer most notable for producing the Madsen machine gun and Madsen M-50.

== History ==
In 1896 V.H.O Madsen designed an air-cooled, repeating machine gun which then took his name, Madsen. In the year 1900 the company Compagnie Madsen A/S was founded. This company was to produce this Madsen machine gun.

In 1930 A.P Møller bought a sum of shares corresponding to 15% of the total shares. In the following years A.P Møller expanded his shareholding to 31.6%, and was hereby the biggest shareholder.

== Arms manufacturing products ==
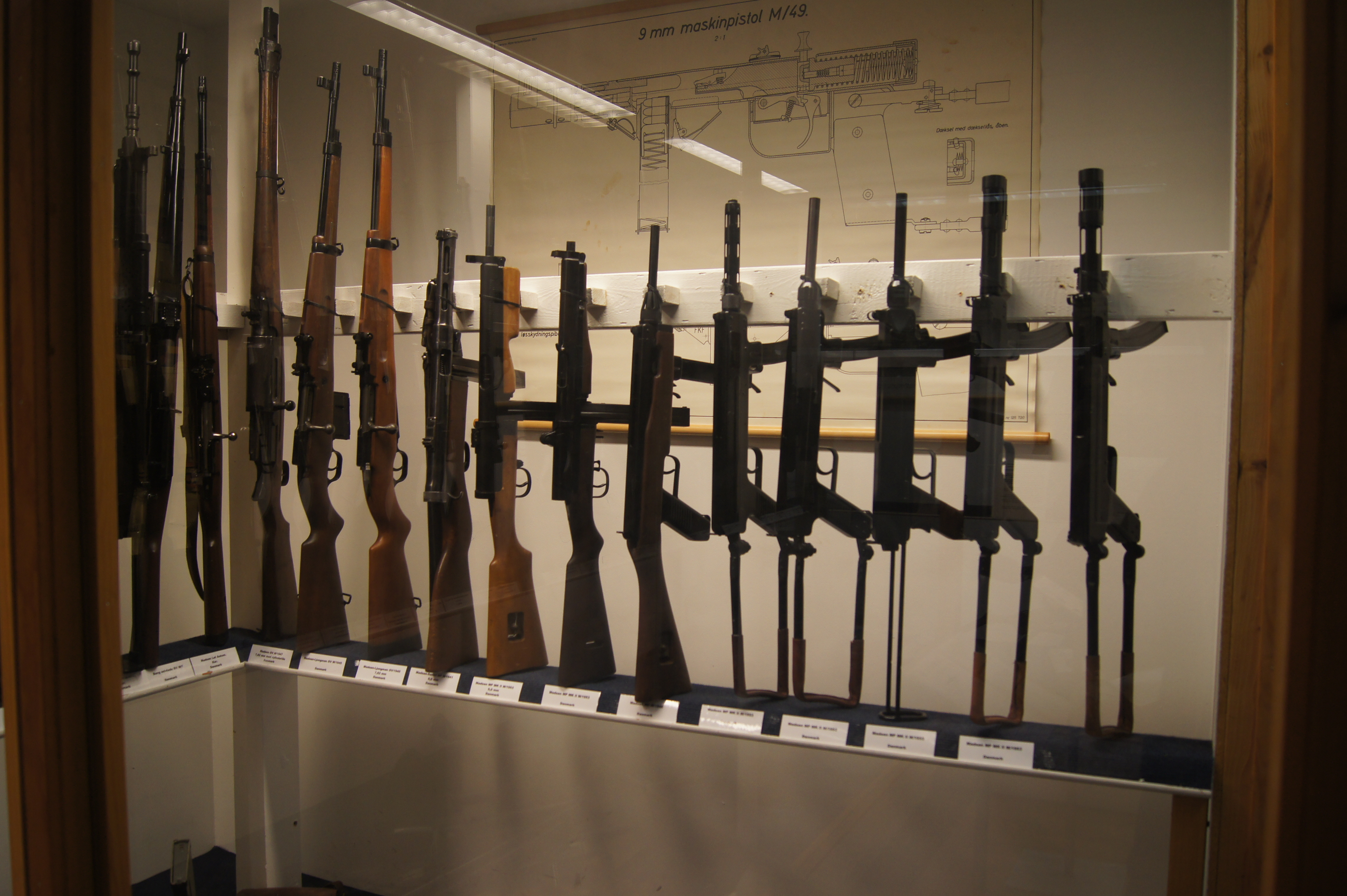
Different types of Madsen weapons

- Madsen M1888 Self Loading rifle
- Madsen M1896 Flaadens Rekylgevær
- Madsen machine gun
- Schouboe Automatic Pistol
- Lightened Experimental submachine gun
- Madsen-Saetter machine gun
- Madsen M45
- Madsen-Ljungmann Self Loading rifle M. 1945
- Madsen M47
- 51 mm Madsen Grenade launcher M 1947
- Madsen M50
- Madsen LAR
- Madsen 20 mm AA gun
