= Flakfortet =

Danish sea fort

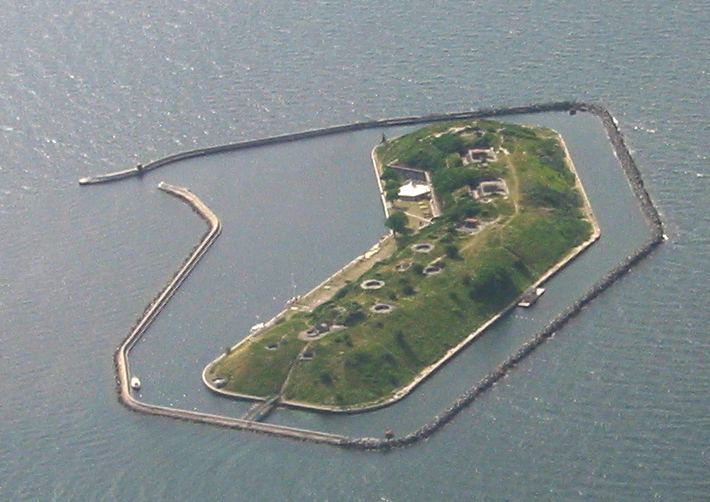
- Flakfortet island

- Location within Denmark

Geography
- Coordinates: 55.703°N 12.732°E
- Area: 0.3 km^{2} (0.12 sq mi)
- Highest elevation: 23 m (75 ft)

Administration
- Denmark

Demographics
- Population: None permanent

Flakfortet, meaning sand-shoal fortress, is a sea fort located on the artificially built island of Saltholmrev, in the Øresund between Copenhagen and Saltholm. The island and fort are simply known as Flakfortet; the name of the island; Saltholmrev, meaning the reef near Saltholm, is seldom used.

Flakfortet was the last of three artificial islands that the Danes created to defend the entrance to Copenhagen's harbor. (The other two are Trekroner Fort (the oldest) and Middelgrundsfortet.) Flakfortet's guns covered the Hollænderdybet channel between Middelgrundsfortet and Saltholm, and the Flinterenden channel between Sweden and Saltholm. Eventually Flakfortet became more of a site for anti-aircraft weapons than for coastal artillery. Its military functions ended in 1968.

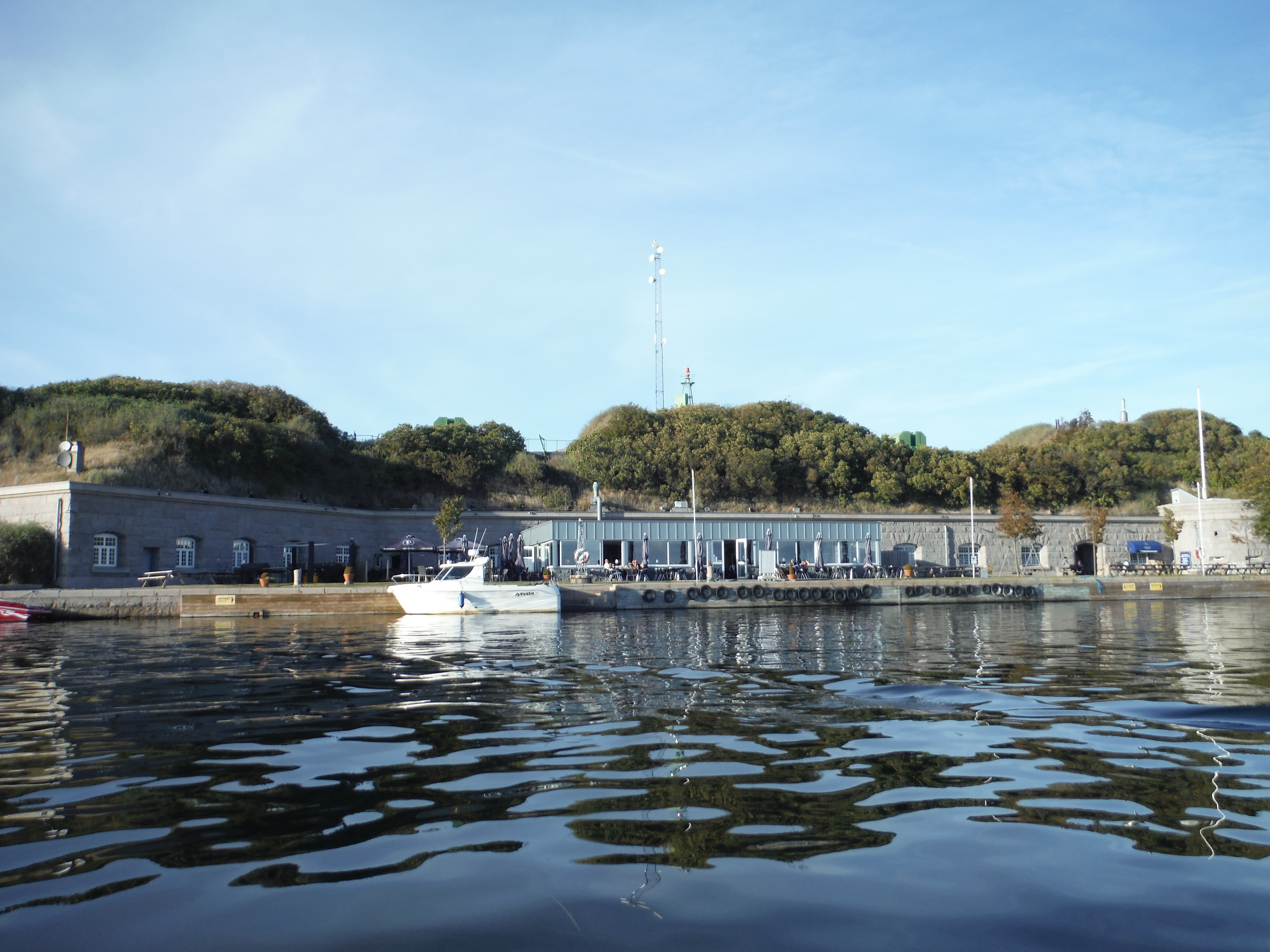
The restaurant

Flakfortet is currently used for recreational purposes such as teambuilding and conferences, and the site has a restaurant and yacht moorings. During the summer, a ferry company, Spar Shipping, has five scheduled trips per day to the island, with the trip from Nyhavn taking about 40 minutes each way. There is an overnight hostel on the island too.

The name does not refer to anti-aircraft artillery (German Flak), but the Danish language word flak, sand shoal.

== History ==
The fort was built in the years 1910–1916 as part of Copenhagen's sea-fortifications. The island is 23 metres (75 ft) high and covers 32,000 square metres (340,000 sq ft). Construction of the artificial island required the use of caissons of reinforced concrete, possibly the first use of such structures. The caissons were first cast at Lynetten quai on Refshale Island, though the last was cast at Flakfortet itself.

The fortifications extended over two floors and included a barracks that once housed the garrison of 550 men. Initially, the fort's armament consisted of four 29 cm M1910 howitzers, six 21 cm M1913 guns, and four 75mm quick-firing guns. Later, it received two 47mm ballonkanoner (anti-balloon guns), another 75mm, and 8mm machine guns. It also received one 90 cm and four 150mm searchlights.

Marshall Plan aid enabled the Danes in 1950 to install a variety of anti-aircraft guns. These included four heavy German 105 mm guns, which were probably moved from Hansted (Hanstholm), six twin-40mm guns (American copies of the Bofors M36, and some 20mm anti-aircraft guns. These newer weapons replaced some of the earlier artillery. Flakfortet then remained in military use until 1957.

In 1965, the Danes decided to establish a Hawk anti-aircraft missile battery on Middelgrundsfortet. However, this fort required extensive renovation so in the interim (1965-1968), the Danes temporarily placed the HAWK battery on Flakfortet. For almost a decade thereafter the fort again stood unused.

In 1975, the Danish Ministry of Defence leased Flakfortet to the Copenhagen Sailing Association and opened the site to the public. Unfortunately, one result was that during this period the fort was the victim of extensive vandalism.

The Danish Ministry of Defence owned Flakfortet until 2001. It was put up for sale in 1999 under the guidance of Statens Ejendomssalg (commonly known as Freja), which is the department under the Danish Ministry of Finance responsible for selling surplus state-owned property.

In June 2001 the Swedish company Malmökranen purchased Flakfortet.
