= Middelgrundsfortet =

Sea fort in Denmark

Coordinates: 55°43′14″N 12°39′57″E

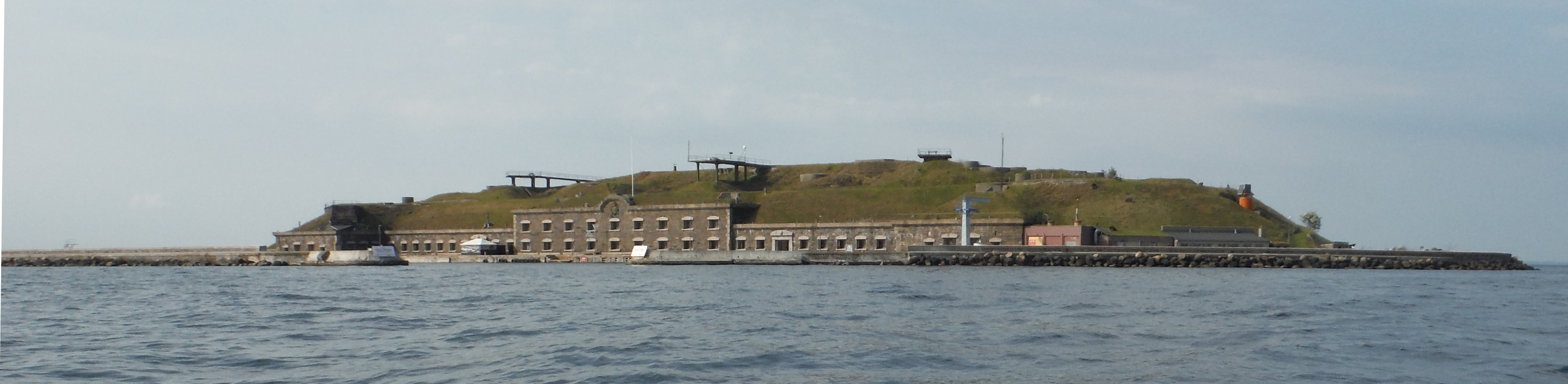
- Middelgrundsfortet in 2016
- Interactive map of Middelgrundsfortet
- Other names: Ungdomsøen

Geography
- Location: Øresund
- Type: Artificial sea fort
- Area: 70,000 m^{2} (750,000 sq ft)

Additional information
- Official website: https://ungdomsoen.dk

Middelgrundsfortet (lit. 'Fort Middle Ground'), known as Ungdomsøen (The Youth Island) since 2015, is a sea fort located on an artificial island in the Øresund between Copenhagen and Malmö. The fortress is constructed at a point where the seabed is 7 meters below the water surface at the northern meeting point of the straits Kongedybet and Hollænderdybet. Ferries connect Middelgrundsfortet with Langelinie, Copenhagen.

The fort was constructed in the 1890s as a military instalment, and had an active military presence until 1984. The island was sold by the state to a private investor in 2002 and was transformed into a hotel, with 200 rooms linked by 2 miles of corridors. In 2015, the island was jointly purchased by two scout organisations and is now used as a camp for children and young people as Ungdomsøen.

== History ==
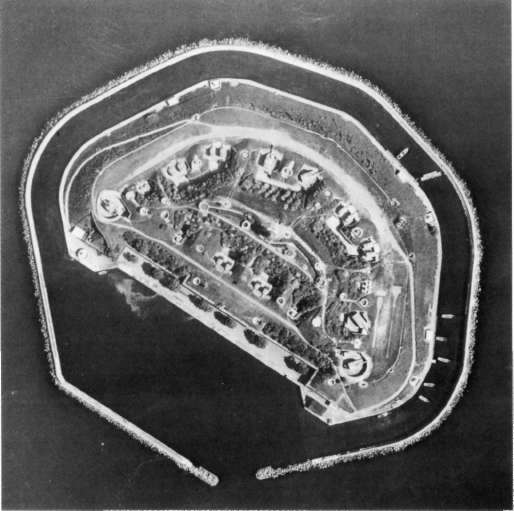
Aerial view of Middelgrundsfortet, c. 1950

Christian IX's government constructed the fort between 1890–94 to serve as a part of Copenhagen's coastal fortifications, partly using material excavated from Frihavnen. It is one of three artificial islands that were created to defend the entrance to Copenhagen's harbour. The other two are Flakfortet and Trekroner Fort.

Middelgrundsfortet was the largest sea fort in the world, and is still the largest man-made island without abutment, with an area, including wave breakers, of approximately 70,000 m^{2}; the buildings total approximately 15,000 m^{2}. A HAWK battery was placed on the island in the 1950s. The fort remained an active military installation until 1984; in 2002 it was sold to a private investor.

== Ungdomsøen ==
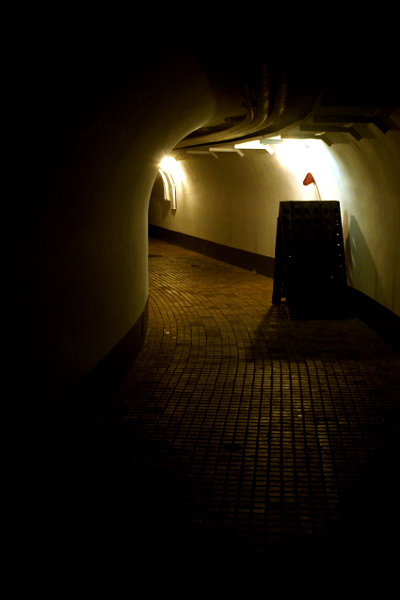
Inside Middelgrundsfortet

In 2010, the island became available for sale at a price of 75 million Danish kroner. Two scout organisations, Det Danske Spejderkorps and KFUM-spejderne, bought the island in April 2015 for 20 million kroner (£1.94M) with money donated by the A. P. Møller and Nordea funds. The two Danish scout organisations intend to develop the facility, at a cost of 25 Million euros, and make space for 400 campers. The camp was envisioned as an adventure playground "for the development of children and young people (not just scouts) into active, engaged and curious people who take the lead for positive social change."

The camp can accommodate over 650 outdoor, and 40 indoor, sleeping guests. It was officially opened in August 2019 by its patron Princess Benedikte. By January 2020 10,000 people had visited the camp.

The KUNE music festival is hosted at the camp. A youth summit, "Young Europe Cares", was hosted by youth activist group Young Europe Is Voting/Youth4Europe at the Ungdomsøen in May 2019.

== Cultural references ==
A view of Middelgrundsfortet from the northwest is seen at 1:07:16 25 in the 1975 Olsen-banden film The Olsen Gang on the Track.
