= Mosede Fort =

Coordinates: 55°33′50″N 12°16′29″E

- Mosede Batteri
- Part of Tune Line
- Karlslunde
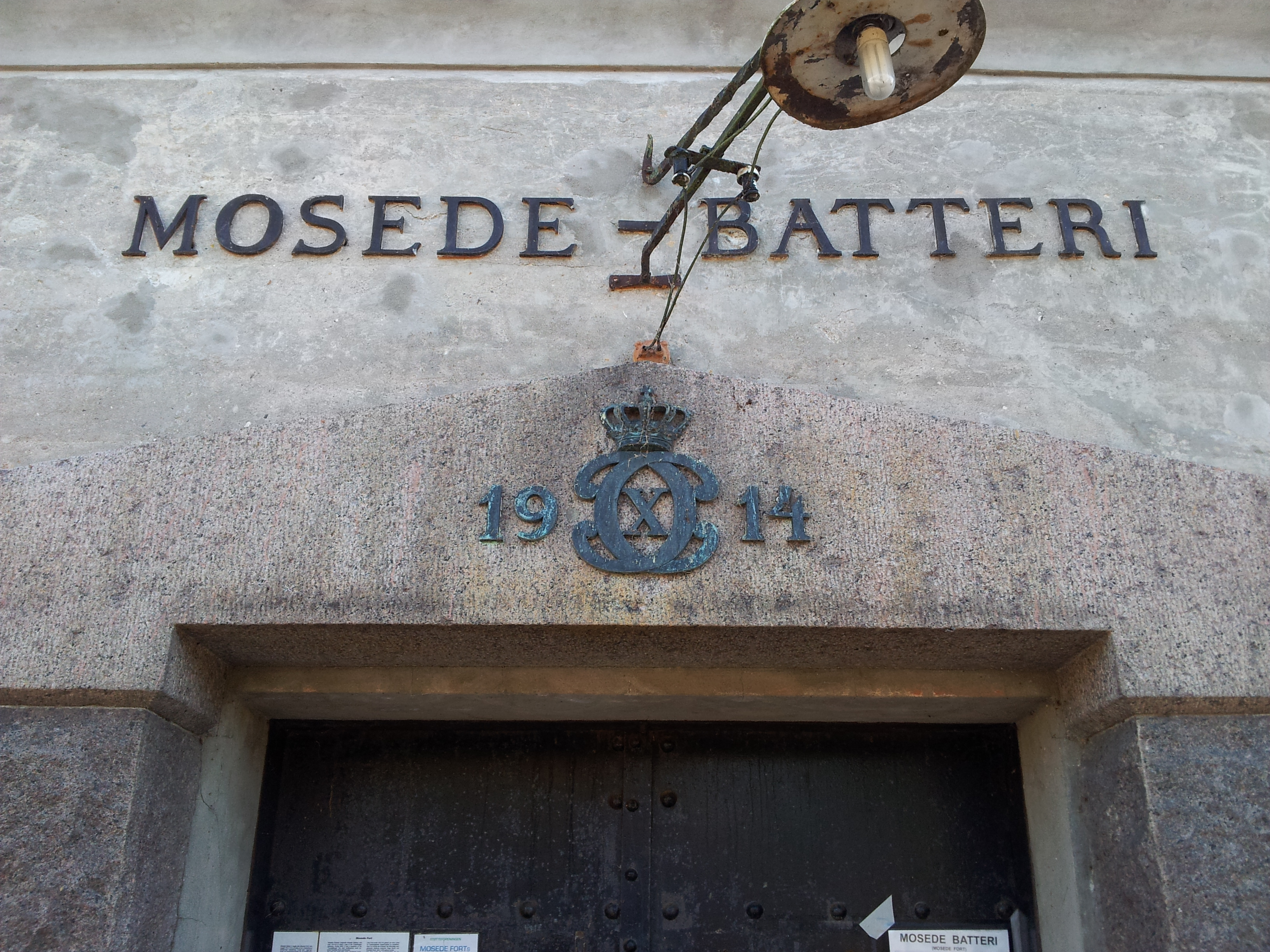
- Entrance for the Casemate

Site information
- Type: Coastal fortification
- Owner: Greve Municipality
- Controlled by: Royal Danish Army (1916–1932) (Nazi Germany) Wehrmacht (1940–1945); Royal Danish Army (1945–1970)
- Open to the public: Yes
- Condition: Well preserved
- Website: Official website

Site history
- Built: 1913—16
- Built by: Sjællandske Engineer Regiment
- In use: 22 July 1916—1970
- Materials: Earthworks, Concrete
- Fate: Abandoned in 1970, turned into museum

Mosede Fort, located in Mosede, Denmark is a coastal fort, part of Tunestillingen (the Tune Line), built in the years before and during the First World War, to protect the Bay of Køge from possible German naval invasions. It is now a protected area with a museum, grassy fields for recreation and a restaurant.

== History ==
=== Construction ===
Mosede Fort was as part of Tunestillingen, a 22 km (14 mi) long line of fortifications around outer-Copenhagen, leading military historian A. N. Hvidt to calling it the "Danevirke of Sjælland". Construction began in 1913, but was first battle-ready in July 1916. The battery was originally dubbed "Mosede Battery" but was popularly called Mosede Fort. It was fully manned until 1922, and was thereafter only used for drills.

=== World War 2 ===
The Fort was re-manned in 1939, but it was captured by the Germans in 1940, who used it as an observations post and prison camp. When Denmark was liberated, the government continued to use the fort as a detention camp until 1947. It was then handed over to Hjemmeværnet, who used it for shooting practice and drills until 1970, when it got overrun and "liberated" by the local population. It has since then been a park open for public.

=== Mosede Fort Today ===
Mosede Fort is now being preserved by Greve Kommune; it is very popular as a recreational area for ballgames, picnics and other pastime activities. It also has a restaurant. In 2010 Greve Kommune along with Greve Museum, began to restore and insulate the old fort so it could be dehumidified sufficiently, in order to store historical objects safely. It was planned to open Denmark's first "Denmark during World War 1" museum with the inauguration on 1 August 2014 - 100 anniversary of Germany's declaration of war on Russia. On 30 September 2012, during the celebration of Copenhagen's fortification, a 120mm Howitzer was presented by Greve Museum as the emblem for Mosede Fort. The museum opened 6 August 2014, with HRH Prince Joachim of Denmark attending.

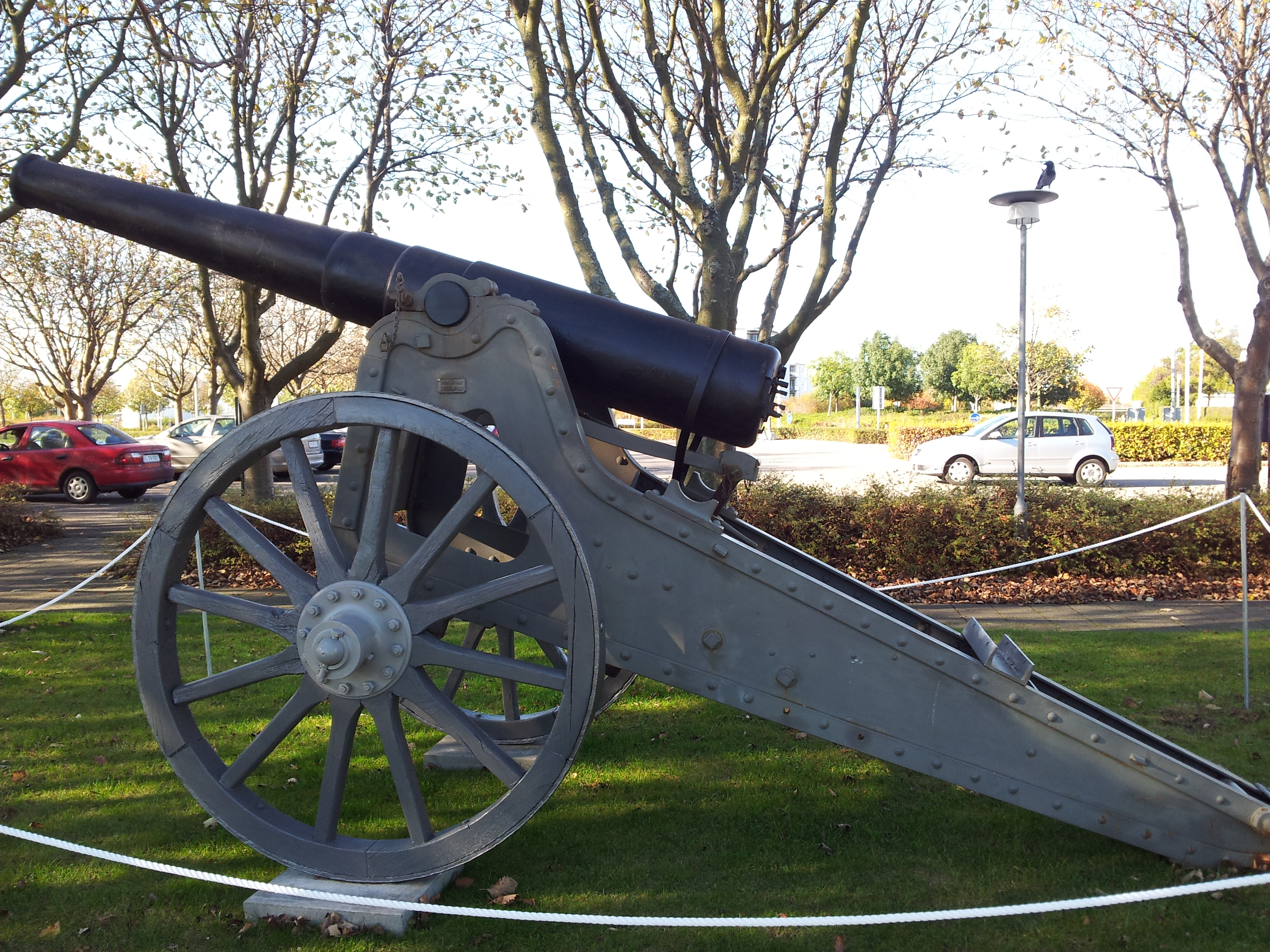
A 120mm canon used for coastal defense, now the emblem for the fort.

== Equipment ==
The fort was equipped with the most modern artillery, a generator, a water-supply, central-heating, telephone, kitchen and bomb-shelters capable of keeping 150 men. The Fort was armed with:

- 6 × 120mm L/15, rapid firing Howitzer (M.1914). Aimed towards the sea
- 4 × 75mm L/30 (M.1914). For coastal, land, and air defense
- 4 × 37mm Maxim gun. For land defense
- 31 Madsen machine guns. For land defense
- A number of searchlights, including 2 × 90mm

== Buildings ==
- The Fort has three smaller bunkers, situated on the beach, together with a medium bunker placed south
- Four bomb shelters, one of which is underground
- Seven major gun positions
- Four minor gun positions
- Look-out station
- A Casemate with officers' room, barracks, telephone central, ammunition rooms, and ammo elevators leading to the large gun-emplacements
