= CETME C2 =

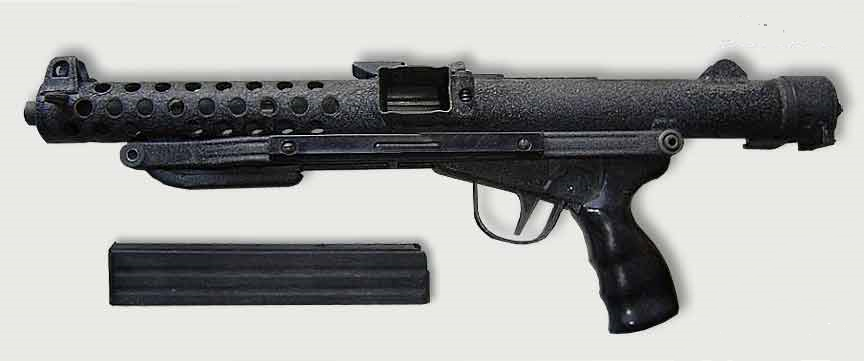
- CETME C2 sub-machinegun with its stock folded & a 30 round magazine
- Type: Submachine gun
- Place of origin: Spain

Service history
- In service: 1960–present
- Used by: Spain

Production history
- Designer: Joaquin de la Calzada de Bayo
- Designed: 1960s
- Manufacturer: CETME
- Produced: 1960s-1970s

Specifications
- Mass: 2.64kg
- Length: 500mm (Folded); 720mm (Unfolded)
- Barrel length: 212mm
- Cartridge: 9×23mm Largo; 9×19mm Parabellum
- Action: Blowback, open bolt
- Rate of fire: 600rpm
- Feed system: 32-round magazine

The CETME C2 (also named the CB-64,) is a Spanish submachine gun based on the British Sterling L2A3. It is an open-bolt, blowback-operated firearm that fires the 9×23mm Largo and 9×19mm Parabellum pistol cartridge. Designed in the 1960s, the C2 has many notable safety features built into it and was later used to replace the Star Model Z-45 submachine gun series for Spain in the 1960s however, was later superseded by the MP5 and Star Z-84.

== Design ==
The CETME C2 has many design features that make it appear as if it was a Sterling SMG however, none of the CETME C2's parts are interchangeable with that of a Sterling. It is open bolt and is often fitted with a 30-round or 32-round straight magazine with the magazine well not being fully perpendicular with the receiver. The receiver itself has a crackle paint finish much like the Sterling SMG & Star Z-62 SMG. The stock is an under folding stock & uses the butt-plate in order to lock the stock to the receiver of the firearm when it is not in use. The C2 has three modes of firing: Seguro (safe,) Tiro (Semi-Automatic,) & Ráfaga (full auto.)

The C2's bolt is helically grooved and also has multiple safety features; The firing pin is not fixed in order to prevent miss fires and can be activated by a lever inside the bolt which can only protrude once the bolt is properly in battery. The bolt itself is not connected to the charging handle & because of this makes bolt non-reciprocating, unlike the Sterling. This is in order to implement a bolt lock in the situation that the bolt accidentally moves forward. In the trigger assembly, there is also a wedge that interferes with the bolt in the case this would occur, this wedge can be hidden by pressing or holding the trigger. This mechanism is used in the situation that the bolt lock is not engaged.

The sights are a rear, V-notch 50-yard iron sight which can be flipped for a 100-yard aperture iron sight, and a square front post iron sight.

The position of the internals of the firearm remains very similar to the Sterling's but have slightly differently designed parts that can only be used in the respective firearms' own receivers.

== History and development ==
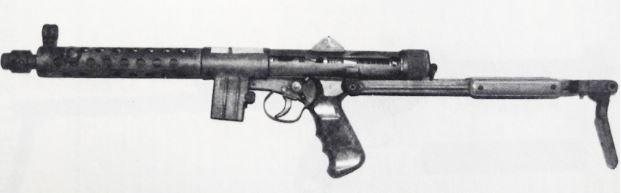
The CETME CB-61 prototype with vertical magazine feed

The CB-64 was developed by state Spanish arms manufacturer, Centro de Estudios Técnicos de Materiales Especiales (CETME,) with the lead designer of the project being Joaquin de la Calzada de Bayo. In the late 1950s, the Spanish's most used sub-machine gun, the Star Z-45 which had been designed in World War II, had become obsolete compared to modern firearms of the time. So, in the early 1960s, the first prototype was designed and was named the Calzada Bayo-61 after Joaquin de la Calzada de Bayo. The design was taken from the Sterling L2A3 and had a vertical feed instead of a horizontal feed which the CETME C2 & Sterling SMG has. For the next few years the CB-61 was improved upon & the CB-64 was created.

The CB-64 was originally chambered for the Spanish National 9x23mm Largo round but was then also chambered in the 9×19mm Parabellum cartridge for export versions as the Largo cartridge was relatively unused by many nations at that time. When the CB-64 was finally being developed for Spain's arsenal, it was given the name CETME C2 because of CETME's coding system for its firearms. The CETME C2 was produced in limited numbers as Spain had already ordered sub-machine guns from Star. The CETME C2 stopped production in the 1970s being replaced by the Star Z-84 and, mainly, the generation three German Heckler & Koch MP5. There are still a small number of CETME C2s still being used by the Spanish armed forces in second-line service.

== See also ==
- CETME
- Star Bonifacio Echeverria
- Star model Z-45
- Star model Z-62
- Star model Z-84

=== Similar firearms ===
- F1 submachine gun
- Sterling SMG
- D-Max Industries 100
