= CETME Ameli =

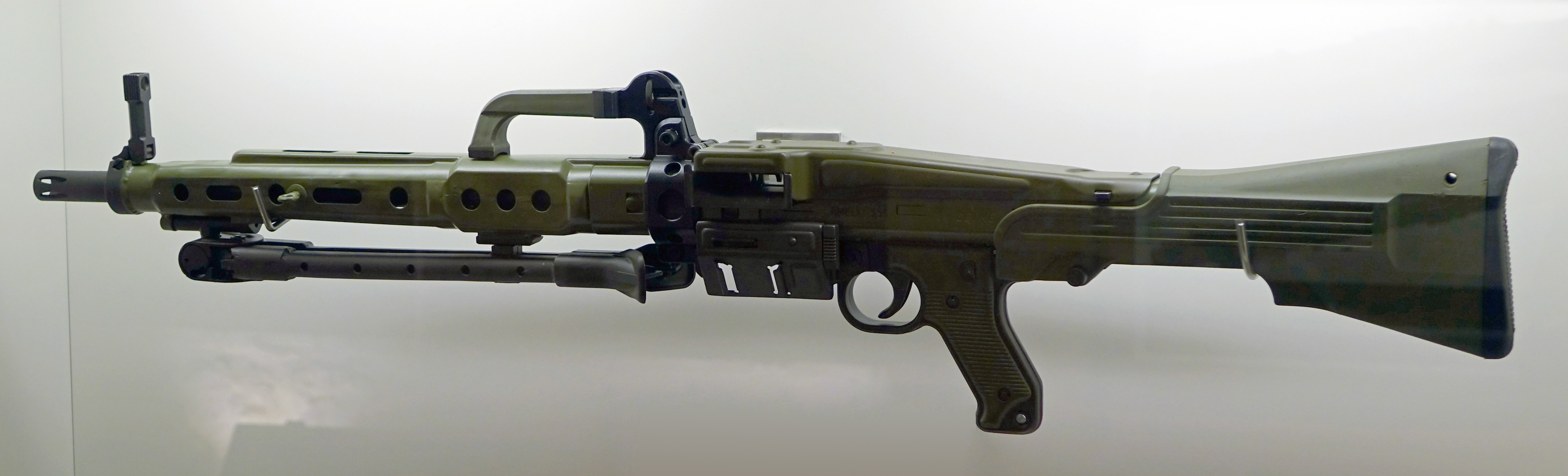
- The CETME Ameli of the Spanish Army
- Type: Light machine gun
- Place of origin: Spain

Service history
- In service: 1982–present
- Used by: See Users
- Wars: Mexican drug war

Production history
- Designer: CETME
- Designed: 1974–1981
- Manufacturer: General Dynamics Santa Bárbara Sistemas
- Produced: 1982–2013

Specifications
- Mass: 5.3 kg (11.68 lb)
- Length: 970 mm (38.2 in)
- Barrel length: 400 mm (15.7 in)
- Cartridge: 5.56×45mm NATO
- Action: Roller-delayed blowback
- Rate of fire: 800–1,200 rounds/min
- Muzzle velocity: 875 m/s (2,871 ft/s) (SS109 cartridge)
- Effective firing range: 300—1,000 m sight adjustments
- Maximum firing range: 1,650 m
- Feed system: 100 or 200-round disintegrating M27 ammunition belt
- Sights: Rear aperture sight and front post 340 mm (13.4 in) sight radius

The Ameli (abbreviated from the Spanish Ametralladora ligera or "light machine gun") is a 5.56mm light machine gun designed for the Spanish Army (Ejército de Tierra) by the nationally owned and operated Centro de Estudios Técnicos de Materiales Especiales (CETME) small arms research institute (founded by the Spanish government in 1950).

Development of the weapon began in 1974 under the supervision of Colonel José María Jiménez Alfaro (who would later become the director of CETME). The Ameli was officially unveiled in 1981 and after undergoing exhaustive military trials was adopted into service in 1982 as the standard squad-level support weapon of the Spanish Army under the designation MG 82. The Ameli was manufactured at the Empresa Nacional Santa Bárbara factory (now General Dynamics Santa Bárbara Sistemas) in A Coruña until 2013, when the factory was closed.

== Design details ==
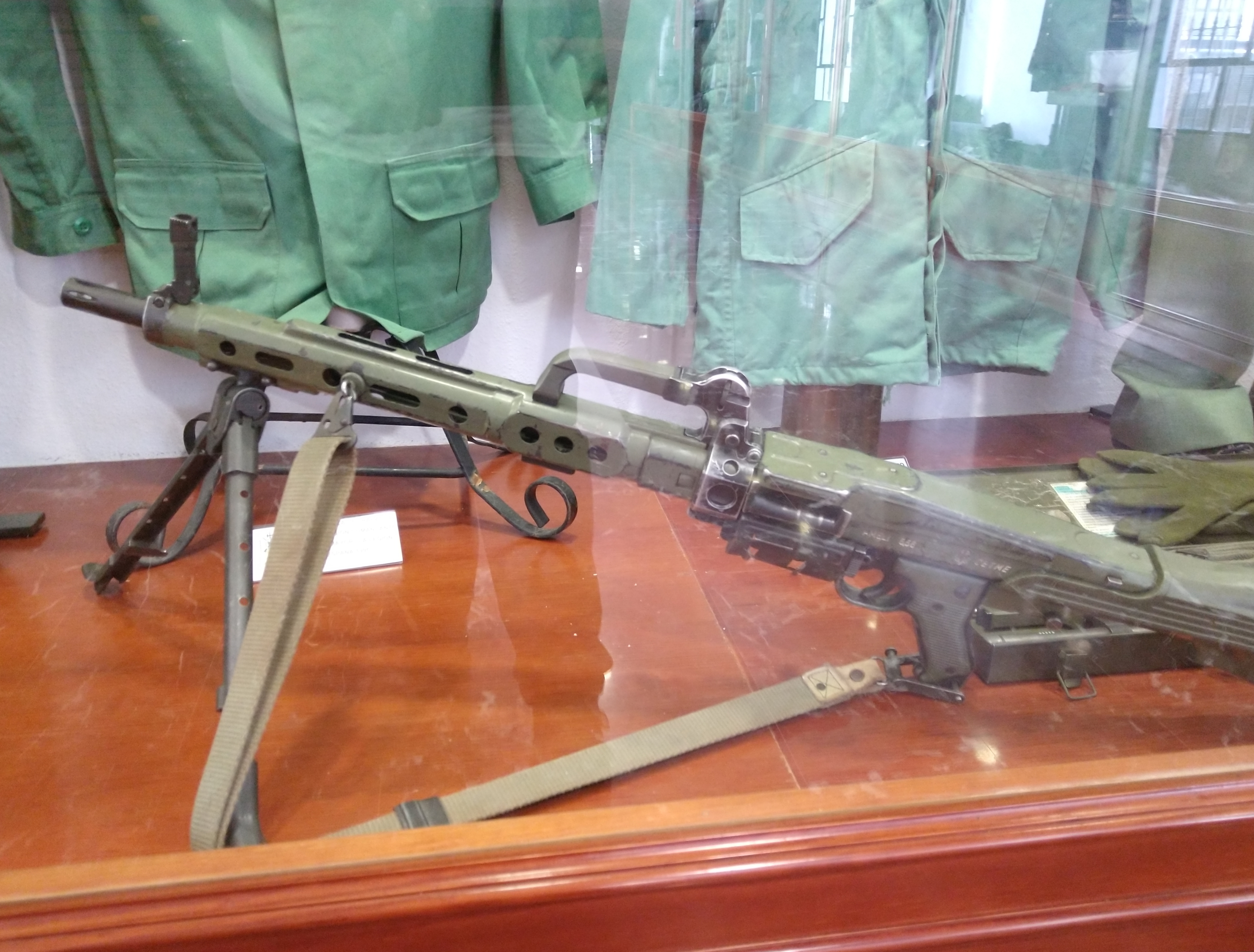
Ameli in the Almeria museum

=== Operating mechanism ===
The Ameli is an automatic weapon that externally resembles the 7.92×57mm Mauser MG 42 machine gun of World War II but has more in common with the MG 45 and its post-war variant, the West German 7.62×51mm NATO MG 3. However, unlike the MG 42's roller-locked short recoil operating principle (where the barrel and bolt recoil together a short distance before unlocking), the Ameli uses the delayed blowback method of operation with a fixed barrel and a pair of rollers which retard the rearward movement of the bolt. This mechanism was employed in CETME's Model A, B, C and Model L series of rifles, and also in the Heckler & Koch G3 battle rifle, HK33 assault rifle and MP5 series of submachine guns. Similarities with the 7.62mm Model C and 5.56mm Model L rifles extend to the interchangeability of certain parts.

The heart of the operating system is the bolt assembly, which consists of a bolt head, locking piece and two cylindrical rollers, which upon chambering a round, are displaced outwards by angled surfaces in the forward pressing locking piece and into notches in the barrel extension. The geometry of the walls in the barrel extension and the locking piece ensure that once a shot is fired, the bolt head absorbs the recoil impulse from the ignited cartridge through the base of the empty casing and transmits this rearward pressure onto the rollers forcing them out of their sockets and inward at a mechanical disadvantage. The rollers then come into contact with inclined surfaces on the locking piece and propel it backwards at a speed that is approximately 1.5x greater than that of the bolt head, thereby increasing the bolt's inertia and providing a delay in the blowback sequence. The relatively short initial rear displacement of the bolt head immediately after firing and the calculated delay eliminate the probability of a premature case extraction from the chamber (beyond the thick-walled base of the chamber) that would result in the spent casing bursting as the breech is opened only after the bullet has exited the barrel and gas pressures inside the bore have dropped to within safe limits.

=== Features ===
The Ameli fires from an open bolt striker firing mechanism (in which the bolt and internally channeled firing pin perform the role of a striker). The trigger mechanism permits fully automatic fire only but the rate of fire can be adjusted by using bolts of varying weight, like in the MG 3. The lighter bolts will produce the maximum rate of fire (1,200 rounds/min) while a heavier bolt results in a rate of fire of approximately 850–900 rounds/min. The weapon features a cross-bolt type safety that disables the sear when pressed into the "safe" position.

The machine gun is fed from an open-link disintegrating M27 ammunition belt that can be strung loosely from the feed tray or placed inside a 100 or 200-round disposable plastic container, which is then clipped to the left side of the receiver. This ammunition container has a transparent rear wall that allows the gunner to monitor ammunition levels visually. Belt movement is carried out by a pawl-type feeding mechanism, which was modeled on the MG 42's feed system. Spent cartridge casings are ejected downward through a chute in the receiver.

The quick-change type air-cooled barrel is equipped with a slotted flash suppressor. The barrel has a chrome-lined bore with 6 right-hand grooves and a 178 mm (1:7 in) rifling twist rate that is optimized for use with heavier SS109 5.56×45mm NATO rounds. A barrel with a 305 mm (1:12 in) twist rate designed specifically to stabilize the lightweight M193 cartridge is also available. The chamber portion of the barrel has flutes that assist in the extraction sequence; once gas pressure in the bore drops to a safe level, recycled gases fill the flutes surrounding the cartridge casing, loosening the case from the chamber walls while residual pressure in the barrel forces it back to be ejected downward and forward. A fixed carrying handle is positioned above the barrel near the chamber, and aids in barrel changes when the barrel becomes too hot; the barrel can be removed and replaced in 5 seconds.

The Ameli is fitted with a molded polymer stock, bipod and iron sights that consist of a forward post and a rear aperture sight contained in the carry handle assembly with 300, 600, 800 and 1,000 m range settings. The weapon's design makes extensive use of sheet metal stampings; both the receiver, barrel shroud and trigger housing are fabricated from steel pressings and then welded. The quick-detach bipod has a height adjustment feature and is mounted to the perforated barrel heat shroud at the muzzle end. The light machine gun can be deployed with the bipod, on a vehicle mount or on a static tripod mount.

== Users ==
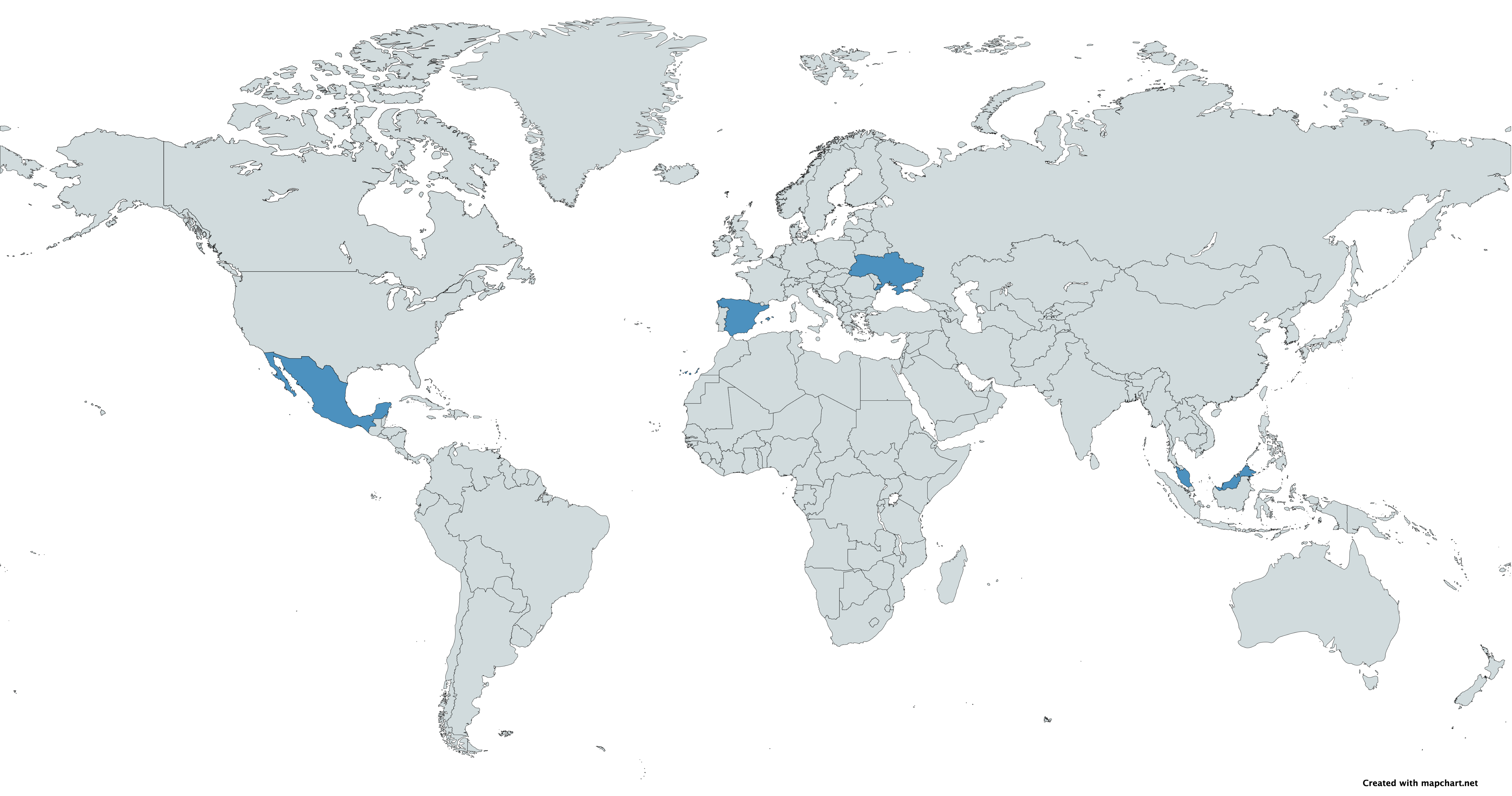
Map with Ameli users in blue

- Malaysia: PASKAL
- Mexico
- Spain
- Ukraine

== See also ==
- FN Minimi – (Belgium)
- MG 45 – (Nazi Germany)
- Beretta AS70/90 – (Italy)
- IWI Negev – (Israel)
- Ultimax 100 – (Singapore)
- Mini-SS – (South Africa)
- RPK – (Soviet Union)

== Bibliography ==
- Crawford, Steve (2003). Twenty-first Century Small Arms: The World's Great Infantry Weapons. St. Paul, MN: Zenith Imprint. ISBN 978-0-7603-1503-3.
- Gander, Terry J.; Ian Hogg (2005). Jane's Guns Recognition Guide, Fourth Edition. London, UK: HarperCollins Publishers. ISBN 978-0-00-718328-9.
- Woźniak, Ryszard (2001). Encyklopedia najnowszej broni palnej—tom 1 A-F (in Polish). Warsaw, Poland: Bellona. ISBN 83-11-09149-8.
