= 7.62×51mm CETME =

Rifle cartridge

- Type: Rifle
- Place of origin: Francoist Spain

Service history
- In service: 1955–1988
- Used by: Spain

Production history
- Designer: CETME
- Designed: 1953

Specifications
- Parent case: 7.62×51mm NATO
- Case type: Rimless, Bottleneck
- Bullet diameter: 7.82 mm (0.308 in)
- Neck diameter: 8.77 mm (0.345 in)
- Shoulder diameter: 11.53 mm (0.454 in)
- Base diameter: 11.94 mm (0.470 in)
- Rim diameter: 12.01 mm (0.473 in)
- Rim thickness: 1.27 mm (0.050 in)
- Case length: 51.18 mm (2.015 in)
- Overall length: 69.85 mm (2.750 in)
- Primer type: Large Rifle

Ballistic performance
Bullet mass/type	Velocity	Energy
113 gr (7 g) FMJ	2,600 ft/s (790 m/s)	1,695.81 ft⋅lbf (2,299.21 J)

The 7.62×51mm CETME round is a variant of the 7.62×51mm NATO rifle cartridge with a plastic-cored lead bullet and a reduced propellant charge. The 7.62×51mm CETME is otherwise identical to the NATO standard. It was produced as a joint venture by the Spanish Government design and development establishment known as CETME (Centro de Estudios Técnicos de Materiales Especiales, or "Center for Technical Studies of Special Materials") and the German arms manufacturer Heckler & Koch.

== Description ==
In 1954, in Ottawa (Canada), the NATO's Experts Commission approved the foreground of 7.62×51mm NATO cartridge. Three years later, it finalized the specifications required for this ammunition. Subsequently, in 1962, this rule was changed.

Spain was relatively isolated from the international community, and did not join NATO until 1982. Following WWII, Spain continued to use the 7.92×57mm Mauser cartridge. From 1953 prototype cartridges begin to take place in 7.62×51mm. In 1955 this caliber is adopted and soon began to be mass-produced for the new CETME rifle. This cartridge did not meet NATO standards and was called 7.62×51mm Spanish. In the '60s, quality improved and became known as 7.62×51mm NATO-SPANISH. Only after 1988 were cartridges produced in Spain known as NATO–REGULAR and met NATO specifications.

During the development of the CETME rifle, it was decided by CETME that their new weapon would be chambered in a .30-caliber rifle cartridge with a short case and lesser powder charge in order to increase the manageability of the rifle during full auto fire. The 7.92×33mm Kurz was the original basis, but the 7.92×41mm CETME M53 also known as the 7.92×40mm, a more powerful experimental cartridge loaded with an innovative extremely long aerodynamic lightweight projectile developed by CETME, was also tried. This evolved into the 7.62×40mm CETME M53, which was identical aside from the smaller diameter bullet. Eventually they decided on a variant of the new 7.62×51mm NATO cartridge that they designated the 7.62×51mm CETME. The 7.62mm CETME had a lighter full-metal-jacketed, plastic-cored lead bullet with a reduced powder charge.

While designing the CETME Modelo B and under recommendation of Heckler & Koch, the decision was made that the updated version of the original CETME Modelo A would chamber the more powerful 7.62×51mm NATO cartridge. When the Modelo B was adopted by the Spanish military as the Modelo 58 in 1958, 7.62×51mm CETME was the standard rifle cartridge but a notable change occurred when Spanish Army officially made a move to the full-power 7.62×51mm NATO standard cartridge. This decision forced the CETME Model 58 to be internally reworked to accept the more powerful round. Marking this change, the revised rifle forms were designated CETME "Model C".

== Weapons ==
- Santa Barbara FR7 Fusil Reformado Bolt Action Rifle (Mauser Model 1916 converted to 7.62×51mm CETME)
- Santa Barbara FR8 Fusil Reformado Bolt Action Rifle (Mauser Model 1943 (Mauser K98k) converted to 7.62×51mm CETME)
- CETME Modelo A Fusil de Asalto - Adopted by the Spanish military in 1957.
- CETME Modelo B Fusil de Asalto / Modelo 58 Fusil de Asalto - Adopted by the Spanish military in 1958.
