= Star Model Z84 =

Star Z-84
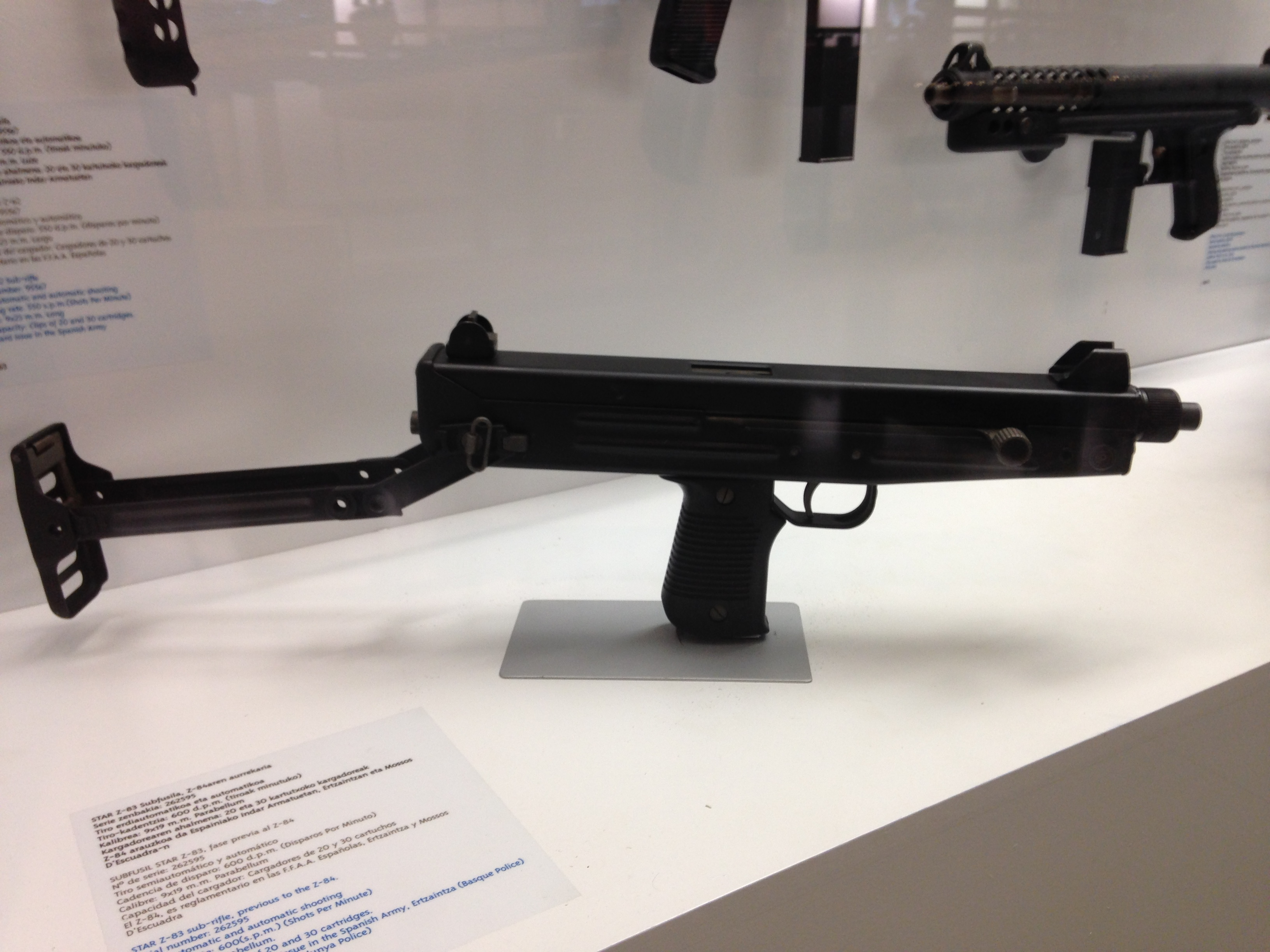
- Star Model Z-84, the "Corto" (shorter barrel) variant
- Type: Submachine gun
- Place of origin: Spain

Service history
- In service: 1980s–present
- Used by: See Users
- Wars: Iran–Iraq War

Production history
- Designer: Eduardo Iraegui
- Designed: 1984
- Manufacturer: Star Bonifacio Echeverria, S.A.
- Produced: 1984–present
- Variants: See Variants

Specifications
- Mass: Corto/Short barrel: 3.10 kg (6.8 lb) Largo/Standard barrel: 3.15 kg (6.9 lb); 25-round magazine: Empty: 0.22 kg (0.49 lb); Full: 0.532 kg (1.17 lb); 30-round magazine: Empty: 0.24 kg (0.53 lb); Full: 0.607 kg (1.34 lb)
- Length: Largo/Standard: 465 mm (18.3 in) with stock retracted; 670 mm (26 in) with stock extended; Corto/Short: 410 mm (16 in) with stock retracted; 615 mm (24.2 in) with stock extended
- Barrel length: Largo/Standard barrel: 270 mm (11 in); Corto/Short barrel: 215 mm (8.5 in)
- Cartridge: 9×19mm Parabellum
- Caliber: 9mm
- Action: Blowback-operated, open bolt, telescoping bolt
- Rate of fire: 600 rounds/min
- Muzzle velocity: 400 metres per second (1,300 ft/s)
- Effective firing range: 150–200m
- Feed system: 25/30-round detachable box magazine
- Sights: Diopter-type iron sights

The Star Z-84 was a Spanish selective-fire submachine gun originally manufactured by the now defunct Star Bonifacio Echeverria, S.A. Originally manufactured for use by Combat Swimmers, the Z-84 could be used right out of the water without any need to drain the working parts or magazine, known as over-the-beach or OTB capability.

== History ==
The Z-75 was Star's modern, 3rd generation, SMG chambered in 9mm Largo. It superficially resembled the UZI, and incorporated the modern features first seen on the Czechoslovak Sa vz. 23, such as an overhanging bolt, to reduce overall length. The receiver was of stamped steel, with a square-section bolt riding on rails internally. It fired from an open bolt in the same method as the earlier weapons used, and had the same 20 cm (7.85 in) barrel length. It weighed 2.6 kg (5.75 lb) unloaded.

The Z-75 was a commercial development project that led to the almost identical Z-84 and the Z-75 never went onto mass production.

Star S.A. developed the weapon after a successful run of submachine guns based on the German MP-40 design. Realizing they couldn't rebuild the same weapon over and over, they built the Z-84 completely from scratch using modern designs and engineering. Chief designer of Z-84 was Eduardo Iraegui.

At the time of the Z-84's design, Star was building and exporting large numbers of cheap handguns to the US. The 1994 Assault Weapons Ban (now repealed), banned the importation of many of their designs. This proved disastrous for Star and other Spanish gunmakers, and by 1996 had driven them into bankruptcy.

== Development ==
The Z-84 is a 9mm Parabellum, blowback operated, selective-fire, capable of fully automatic firing, open bolt weapon which heavily derives from the Z-75. Having very few moving parts makes it a very simple weapon to operate and maintain. Made mostly of stamped and cast parts, little machining is needed to produce the weapon. It uses an "overhung" bolt meaning the bolt actually rides forward over the barrel for 3". This allows a shorter overall length while maintaining a long barrel for better accuracy. First pioneered in the Czechoslovak Sa vz. 23 submachine gun, the overhung bolt had become a fixture in many of today's modern designed SMGs, being employed in firearms such as the Israeli UZI and Italian Beretta M12.

A sturdy folding metal stock helps the weapon gain accuracy when fired from the shoulder, and has a safety switch on the trigger. The sights are protected by large steel ears and are adjustable; the rear sight is a diopter sight with 100 and 200 meter settings and the front is adjustable for windage and elevation.

== Variants ==
There are two variants of the weapon:

1. "Corto", the short barrel version with 215 mm barrel, different iron sights (similar to that of CETME L) and was designed originally for Guardia Civil to fulfill their requirements.
2. "Largo", the standard version with the longer barrel, 270mm in length.

== Users ==
- Iran: IRGC and the Sepah Navy Special Forces. Reported to be produced with no license from Star.
- Spain: UEBC combat diver group of the Spanish Navy.
- Ukraine: Special Operations unit of the Maritime Guard of DPSU

=== Former Users ===
- Malaysia: Formerly with the Royal Malaysian Police, now on display at the Police Museum.

== Gallery ==
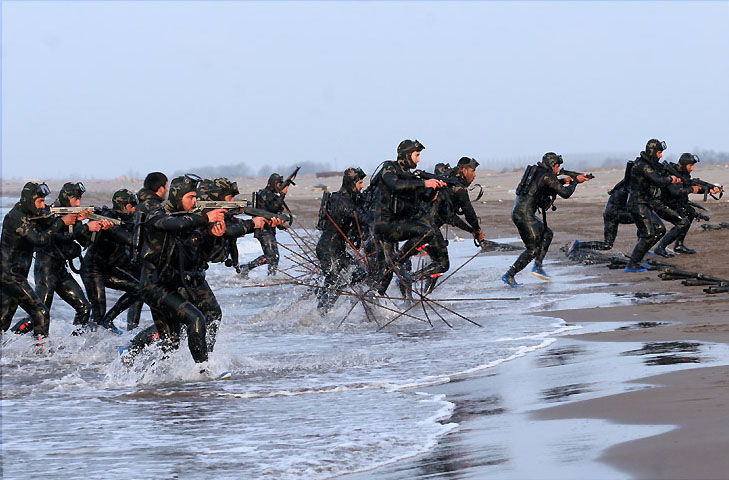
IRGCN frogmen mostly equipped with Z-84 submachine guns in an amphibious exercise of Great Prophet IX war games exercise.

== See also ==
- List of submachine guns
