= Open bolt =

System in firearms

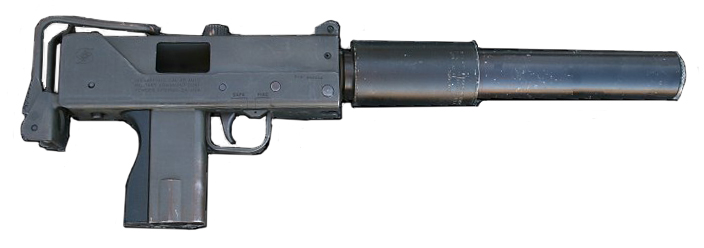
A MAC-10 submachine gun

A firearm is said to fire from an open bolt or open breech if, when ready to fire, the bolt and working parts are held to the rear of the receiver, with no round in the chamber. When the trigger is actuated, the bolt travels forward, feeds a cartridge from the magazine or belt into the chamber, and fires that cartridge in the same movement. Like any other self-loading design, the action is cycled by the energy released from the propellant, which sends the bolt back to the rear, compressing the mainspring in readiness for firing the next round. In an open-bolt gun firing semi-automatically, the bolt is caught and held at this point by the sear after each shot; and in automatic open-bolt fire, it is caught and held in this manner whenever the trigger is released. In contrast to this, in closed-bolt guns, the trigger and sear do not affect the movement of the bolt directly.

Generally, an open-bolt firing cycle is used for fully automatic weapons and not for semi-automatic weapons (except some semi-automatic conversions of automatic designs). Firearms using advanced primer ignition blowback inherently fire from open bolt only.

== Advantages ==
Compared to a closed-bolt design, open-bolt weapons generally have fewer moving parts. The firing pin is often part of the bolt, saving on manufacturing costs; the inertia of the bolt closing also causes the fixed firing pin to strike a blow on the primer, without need for a separate hammer/striker and spring. In automatic weapons, an open bolt helps eliminate the dangerous phenomenon known as "cook-off", in which the firing chamber becomes so hot that rounds spontaneously fire without trigger input. Open-bolt designs typically remain much cooler in operation than closed-bolt types due to the airflow allowed into the chamber, action and barrel during pauses between bursts; moreover, unlike in the case of the closed-bolt format, the initial round in a burst is not introduced into the chamber until the moment before firing, and is thus only exposed to the residual heat for a fraction of a second. These two features combine to make open-bolt operation more suitable for weapons such as machine guns, which are intended to be capable of prolonged automatic fire. Open-bolt firearms also allow water drainage in underwater firearms.

== Disadvantages ==
Firstly, the bolt retention mechanism may fail, resulting in a spontaneous discharge (i.e., without prior trigger input), with potentially dangerous consequences. Some simple submachine gun designs, such as the Sten, can discharge spontaneously when dropped onto a hard surface – even when uncocked – as the collision can jolt the bolt backward far enough that on returning it will pick up a round from the magazine, chamber it and fire it; the risk is intrinsic to hand-held open-bolt guns unless safety features are included in the design.

Another shortcoming of the open-bolt principle is that there is a brief delay between the trigger-pull and the firing of the cartridge because the (rather inert) bolt has to move forward a significant distance between the two events. Since after the first shot an open-bolt firearm operates effectively indistinguishably from a closed-bolt firearm, this latency problem is generally less of a concern in full automatic fire and mostly applies to semi-automatic mode. The issue was most problematic in the use of forward-firing open-bolt machine guns and autocannons in (tractor configuration single-engine) fighters during the piston engine era. Given the highly dynamic nature of aerial combat, the aforementioned intrinsic firing delay of open-bolt guns is particularly undesirable. The inertia and latency inherent to the open bolt design negatively affects predictability and control and makes fitting open-bolt designs with synchronization gear to fire through the propeller blades difficult and often requiring extensive modification (but not impossible).

Furthermore, with unlocked simple blowback action designs, calibers over 9×19mm Parabellum become increasingly less practical because of the need for correspondingly heavier bolts as the chamber pressure increases. In simple blowback open-bolt designs, even in such relatively low-power calibers, the movement of the heavy bolt mass within the gun negatively affects aim and accuracy in two ways:

1. In sustained automatic fire, it is difficult to keep the gun on target;
2. In semi-automatic fire, or at the beginning of each automatic burst, the "latency problem" described above is exacerbated (due to the greater inertia of the heavier bolt).

While the latency is unavoidable with the open-bolt design, more sophisticated delayed-blowback open-bolt designs do allow for use of a lighter bolt, thus reducing the gap in performance between open and closed bolt types. However, these designs are uncommon due to economics and complexity.

Lastly, unless an ejection port cover is used, breech and action internals' exposure to the elements renders open-bolt designs universally vulnerable to contamination with dirt and dust through the open ejection port. Some versions of the open-bolt M3 submachine gun utilize a hinged sheet metal ejection port cover that doubles as a safety; when closed, it both covers the ejection port and blocks the bolt from closing. When ready to fire, the user simply flips the cover down, opening the ejection port and unblocking the bolt.

== Other characteristics ==
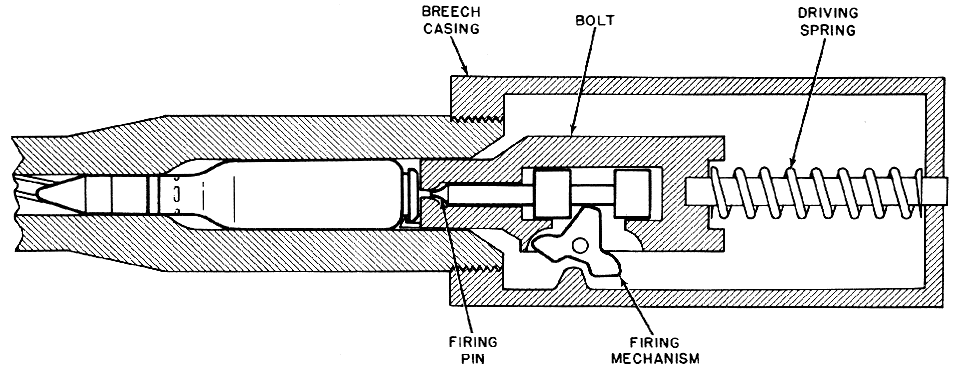
Schematic of an Advanced Primer Ignition blowback operation that works by striking the cartridge as its moving forward before it is fully chambered. The forward inertia of the bolt and firing from an open bolt position enables handling of higher pressure ammunition, although it requires the use of rebated rim cartridges

An open-bolt weapon will typically have a higher rate of automatic fire than a comparable closed-bolt weapon as the bolt simply needs to return forwards in order for the weapon to fire again, while a closed-bolt design has the additional step of the hammer striking the firing pin. Having a higher fire rate can be both an advantage and disadvantage depending on the situation. For handheld weapons, typically a lower rate of fire is desirable, as this will conserve ammunition and help keep the level of recoil more manageable. For vehicle-mounted weapons or fixed emplacements, however, a higher rate of fire is often desirable. In these situations, ammunition and recoil are less of a concern and the higher rate of fire will increase the likelihood of a round hitting the target, particularly when employed against fast-moving targets such as aircraft.

Many movies and video games portray open-bolt weapons as needing to be cycled after reloading. This is not generally true, however, as open-bolt weapons send the bolt carrier back into a cocked position via the excess gas after the last round is fired. The exception to this is if the weapon is fully automatic and the trigger is held down after the last round was fired (and the gun does not have a "last round bolt hold open" mechanism) at which point the bolt will fly forward once more and stay there. In this case, the bolt merely needs to be retracted to the rearward position and does not return forward as is sometimes portrayed.

Another feature of open-bolt designs is that the magazine simply needs to be removed to completely unload the weapon. A closed bolt requires the second step of cycling the action to remove the last round in the chamber (unless the weapon features an automatic hold-open device). It is essential to remove a loaded magazine before performing maintenance, or trying to cycle or close the bolt (as is often done to keep the weapon clean when not in use). If one were to close the bolt (say by pulling the trigger and riding the bolt to the closed position), as soon as the bolt closes it will fire if a loaded magazine was left in the gun. This may be true with weapons utilizing a striker, but not with a weapon using a fixed firing pin, which relies on the momentum of the bolt to impart the energy to ignite the primer. This is a common feature in basic submachine guns like the Sten gun or M3 "Grease Gun", and even some machine guns. With a fixed firing pin, when the bolt is closed gently, without the momentum of the bolt closing at normal speed, there is not enough force imparted to the firing pin to ignite the primer. In this circumstance there will be a round in the chamber and a firing pin pressing on it with some force, but not enough to ignite the primer, which requires a sharp, focused impact. However, the weapon would be at risk of firing if dropped, much like the danger of loading spitzer bullets into a weapon with a tube magazine. A related issue is that the safety of an open-bolt weapon must be designed to lock the bolt in the rearward position. Often safeties only block the movement of the trigger, so, as explained above, if the weapon is dropped or if the sear becomes worn, the bolt can slam home, firing the weapon (although this issue is true to a degree in closed-bolt firearms as well).

== Uses ==
Schematic of a springloading open bolt firearm operation (using rotating bolt)

Closed-bolt designs are often used in rifles. The improved accuracy of closed-bolt weapons is more desirable, while the poorer heat dissipation is less of an issue for slower-firing weapons. In contrast, open-bolt designs are more often used in automatic weapons, such as machine guns. For fast-firing automatic weapons, heat will rapidly build up from sustained firing, but accuracy is of less importance. Thus, the improved heat dissipation of open-bolt designs is generally more desirable in automatic weapons. Submachine guns were for much of their life designed with open bolts such as the Thompson submachine gun, MP-40 and the Uzi, mainly for the simplicity and economical advantages, and their rates of fire and close-range nature mitigated the reduced accuracy of the design. SMGs used and built in the current day, such as the H&K MP5 series, have almost universally moved to closed-bolt designs for their practical advantages.

== Examples ==
=== Open-bolt ===
- Alpha GPI
- AMAC Delta-786
- APS underwater rifle
- ArmaLite AR-103 and AR-104
- AA-12 Shotgun
- Browning Automatic Rifle
- Bren light machine gun
- Carl Gustav M/45
- CETME Ameli
- CETME C2
- Chauchat machine rifle
- Cobray M11
- Degtyaryov machine gun
- F1 submachine gun
- FBP submachine gun
- FN MAG and variants (including the M240)
- FN Minimi and variants (including the M249)
- Gevarm A6
- Halcón M-1943
- HAFDASA HA a unique 22lr pistol made in Argentina
- Intratec KG-9
- Jatimatic
- Kk 62
- Lahti-Saloranta M/26
- Lanchester submachine gun
- Lewis gun
- M3
- M56
- M60
- M231 FPW
- MAC-10 and variants (including the MAC-11)
- MAC-58
- Madsen M-50
- MAT 49
- MG34
- MG42
- Mk-19
- MP18
- Minebea PM-9
- MP40
- Nikonov machine gun
- Owen Gun
- Parinco mod. 3R
- PK machine gun
- PM-63 RAK
- PPS submachine gun
- PPSh-41
- PPS-43
- Ranger-34a
- Rheinmetall MG3
- RPD
- SACO Model 683
- SG-43
- SIG MG710
- Smith & Wesson Model 76
- Star Model Z-45
- Star Model Z62
- Star Model Z84
- Sten submachine gun
- Sterling submachine gun
- Steyr AUG (LMG configuration)
- Stoner 63 (LMG configuration)
- Thompson submachine gun
- TRW Low Maintenance Rifle
- Type 100 submachine gun
- UKM-2000
- Ultimax 100
- Uru
- Uzi
- Vigneron submachine gun
- Voere 2005/1
- MP3008

=== Mixed-mode ===
Examples of mixed mode firearms (capable of operating from either an open bolt or closed bolt) include:

- ArmaLite AR-100 - AR-101 and AR-102
- CETME Model A
- FG 42
- FN SCAR - Heat Adaptive Modular Rifle
- Johnson LMG
- LWRC IAR - M6A4
- Dror light machine gun

== Legality ==
=== United States ===
Under United States federal law, machineguns are restricted under the National Firearms Act and other laws. Beginning in 1982, the ATF started classifying some open bolt firearms as machineguns, namely the KG-9 pistol, SM-10 pistol, SM-11A pistol, SAC Carbine, and the YAC Sten MK II. Around the time of these rulings, the manufacture of new open-bolt semi-automatic firearms became uncommon in the United States. The open bolt semi-automatic versions of certain guns are often as costly as their fully automatic counterparts since, prior to the Hughes Amendment, many such guns were lawfully converted into machineguns. However, there are many open-bolt firearms, that are not classified as machine guns. The Fox Carbine is one such example of an open-bolt firearm that was ruled to not be a machine gun.

== See also ==
- Action (firearms)
- Out-of-battery
- List of firearm terminology
- List of established military terms
