= CETME rifle =

Spanish battle rifle manufactured by CETME

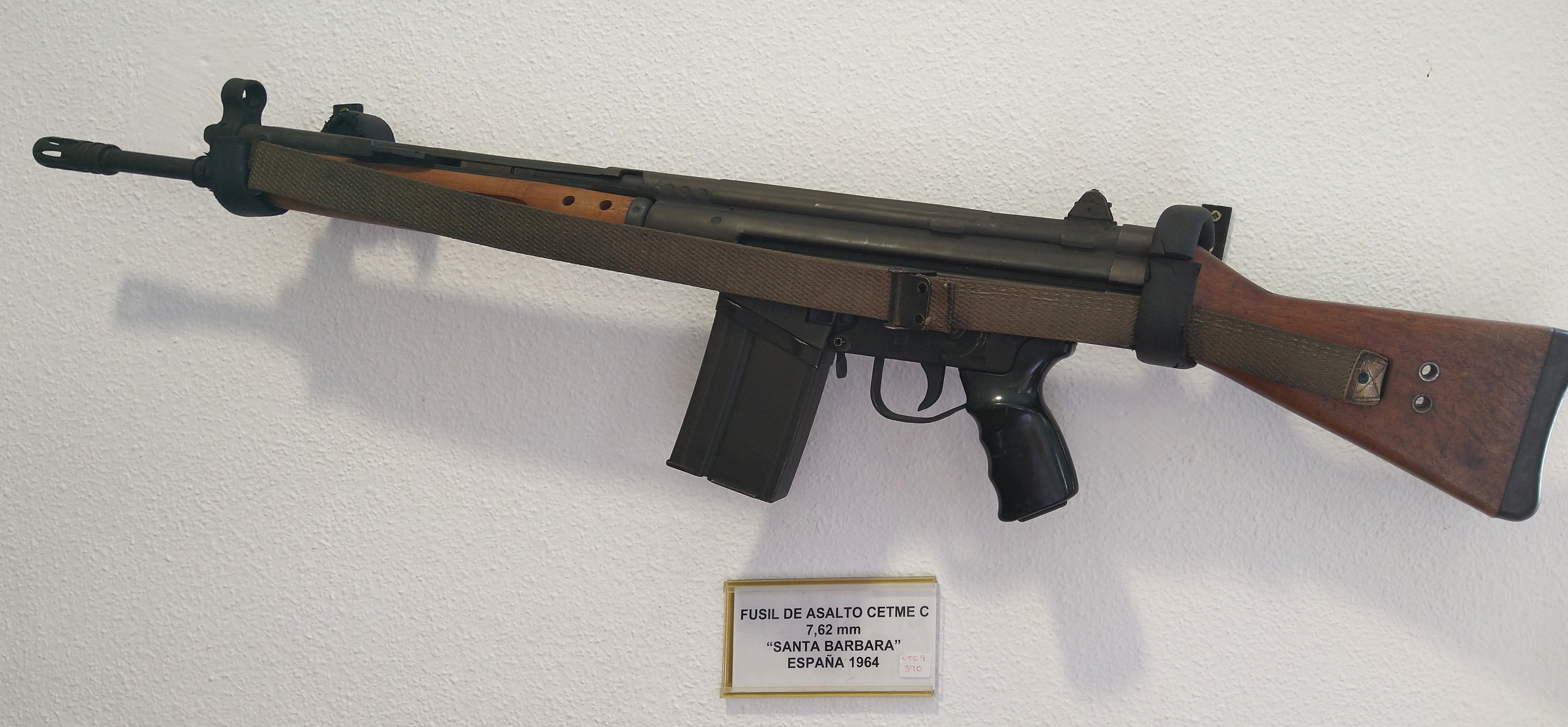
- CETME Model C battle rifle
- Type: Battle rifle
- Place of origin: Francoist Spain / Spanish transition to democracy

Service history
- In service: 1961–present
- Used by: See Users
- Wars: Ifni War; Basque conflict; Algerian War; Congo Crisis; Nigerian Civil War; Zemla Intifada; Sahrawi insurgency; Western Sahara War; Lebanese Civil War

Production history
- Designer: Ludwig Vorgrimler
- Designed: 1948–1950
- Manufacturer: Centro de Estudios Técnicos de Materiales Especiales (CETME)
- Produced: 1950–1983

Specifications
- Mass: 9.9 lb (4.49 kg)
- Length: 40 in (1,016 mm)
- Barrel length: 17.7 in (450 mm)
- Cartridge: 7.92×41mm CETME (Model A); 7.62×51mm CETME (early Model B); 7.62×51mm NATO (other models)
- Action: Roller-delayed blowback
- Rate of fire: Full-auto: 550-650 rounds per minute
- Muzzle velocity: 2580 ft/sec (786 m/s)
- Feed system: 20-round detachable box magazine
- Sights: Iron sights

The CETME Model 58 is a stamped-steel, select-fire battle rifle produced by the Spanish armaments manufacturer Centro de Estudios Técnicos de Materiales Especiales (CETME). The Model 58 used a 20-round box magazine and was chambered for the 7.62×51mm NATO round (although originally designed for the 7.92×41mm CETME cartridge and later for the reduced power Spanish 7.62×51mm cartridge). The CETME 58 would become the foundation of the widely deployed German Heckler & Koch G3 battle rifle. Semi-automatic variants were also produced for the civilian market.

== Development ==
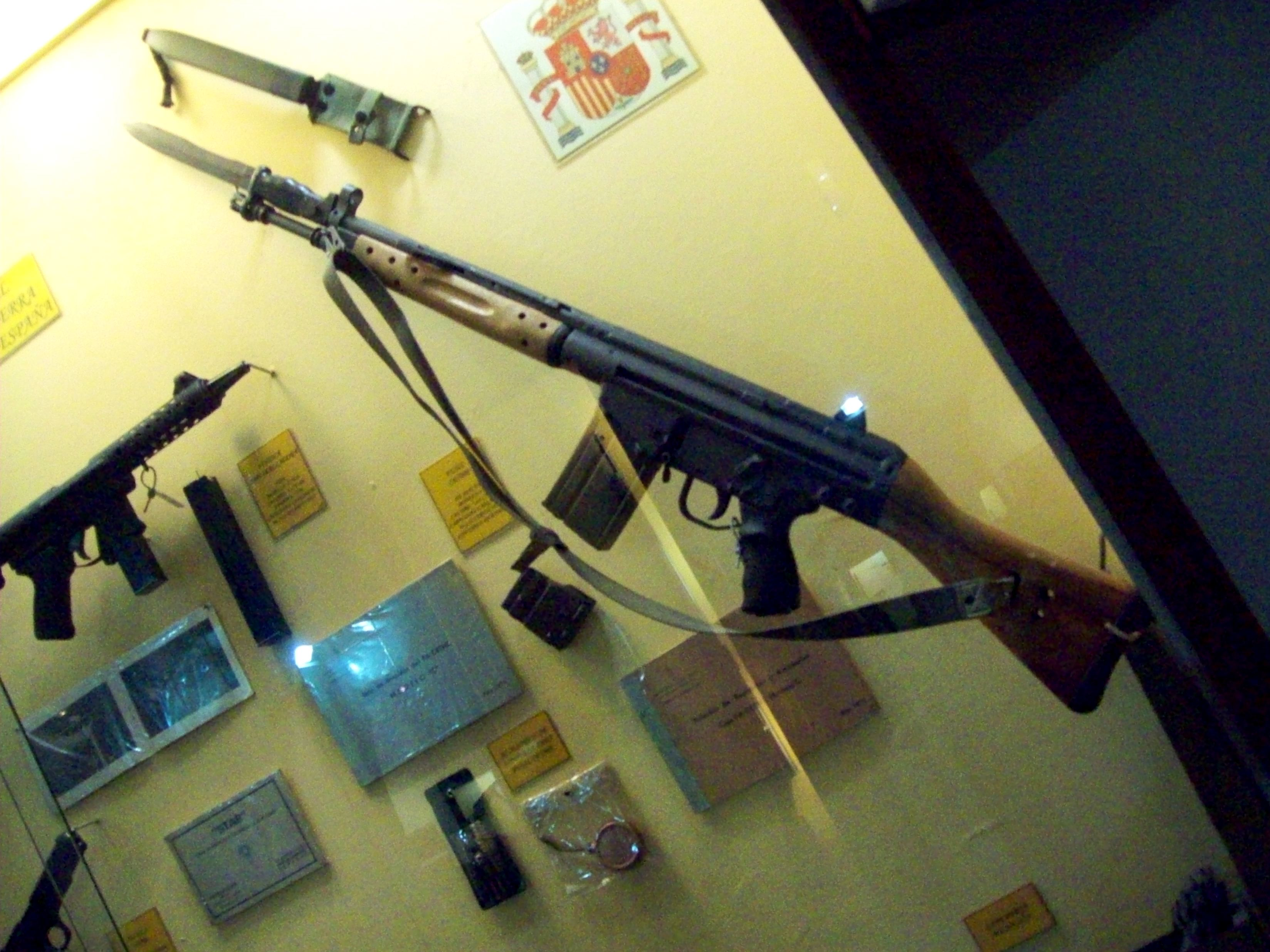
CETME rifle with bayonet

Schematic of a fluted chamber, as used in the CETME rifle

The CETME (Centro de Estudios Técnicos de Materiales Especiales) rifle was designed primarily by the German engineer Ludwig Vorgrimler, who based his design on the experimental German StG 45(M) and the French-made AME 49. The StG45 used a roller-delayed blowback mechanism somewhat similar to the roller-locking system patented by Edward Stecke in the 1930s in Poland and used in the MG 42. The MG42 locking system actually locks completely and requires a short-stroke barrel that travels backward to unlock, compared to the StG45(M) system that never completely locks and does not require a moving barrel.

The CETME design inherits the StG45(M)'s fixed barrel. However, the CETME Model 58 introduced a novel solution to the problem of cartridges sticking in the chamber, namely, a fluted chamber—horizontal grooves in the chamber—that allows the cartridge cases to float on a layer of gas to aid extraction. The horizontal marking left on spent cartridge cases has become a signature of this design.

The requirements for the original design specified that the rifle weigh no more than 4.1 kg, had an effective range of 1,000 metres and a large magazine capacity. This required an ambitious development of rifle technology but the CETME engineers, based on earlier German experiments, believed this would be possible using an unconventional projectile.

Thus the 7.92×41mm CETME, CA-001 cartridge was developed and unveiled in 1953. It would be lightweight and elongated to make it aerodynamic, yet fired at normal rifle velocities. The rounds weighed 6.8 grams and had a muzzle velocity of 800 m/s. To allow such a long projectile to be stable in flight, a method was required to achieve proper mass distribution. The solution was that the aluminium core be wrapped around the middle in a copper jacket that was open at both ends, leaving the exposed aluminium core at either end (the core's middle section was compressed to allow the copper jacket to fit without protruding). While such a lightweight bullet would normally be affected by crosswinds compared to a normal weight projectile, the engineers at CETME contended that the bullet's aerodynamic shape minimised this problem. Sources from the time indicate that at 1,000 metres, the dispersion characteristics of the bullet were equal to those of normal rifle projectiles despite its light weight. In addition, sources state that at 1,000 metres, the projectile could perforate Spanish, Russian, Italian, Czech and German helmets. The bullet reportedly behaved like a standard full metal jacket bullet. The lightness of the projectile meant it had a lower recoil impulse, which was a key objective of the engineers as it would reduce bullet dispersion during fully automatic fire.

Later on in development, the Bundesgrenzschutz informed CETME that they were interested in the rifle but requested the cartridge diameter be reduced from 7.92mm to 7.62mm and that the same 41mm cartridge case should be used. This was accomplished after considerable time and effort, with the new round being designated the 7.62×41mm CETME, CA-002. Despite the rifle performing excellently with this cartridge, the Bundesgrenzschutz later stated that they could only adopt it if it was rechambered for the 7.62×51mm NATO cartridge due to standardisation agreements and thus the weapon was redesigned for this NATO cartridge, designated by the Spanish as Modelo B.

The first prototype rifles fired the same 7.92×33mm Kurz round as the StG45, and a variety of experimental 7.92 and 7.62mm cartridges were tested before settling on the 7.62×51mm CETME. This round, chosen due to requirements of the then-interested West German Bundesgrenzschutz, was dimensionally identical to 7.62×51mm NATO, but with a lighter bullet and powder charge to reduce recoil, making the fully automatic fire more controllable. In December 1956, the West German Bundeswehr received 400 CETME A rifles for intensive trials. Due to the tests performed by the Bundesamt für Wehrtechnik und Beschaffung, the ergonomy of the rifle was improved. With feedback from Heckler & Koch, the rifle was able to fire the fully powered 7.62×51mm NATO round due to the better quality of its steel. The Model B went on to be the foundation of the widely deployed Heckler & Koch G3 battle rifle.

The CETME B rifle in 7.62×51mm CETME was adopted as the Fusil de Asalto CETME Modelo 1958 de 7,62mm by the Spanish Army in September 1957 and its production began in Spain during 1961. The CETME series of battle rifles were manufactured in four basic models; the A, B, C and E models. The primary difference in the production models is the modes of fire, the absence of bipod and lighter weight for later models.

=== Trials ===
The Spanish CETME A was tested at Aberdeen Proving Ground in July 1954. The CETME Model A in 7.62 CETME and 7.62 NATO was also demonstrated to the French, Swedes and Italians in 1955.

From 1957, the Dutch company Nederlandse Wapen en Munitiefabriek also demonstrated the CETME/H&K Model B rifle to the Royal Netherlands Army, the Netherlands Marine Corps, Finland (chambered in 7.62×39mm), Ecuador and Dominican Republic, but no gun was produced nor ordered.

== Models ==
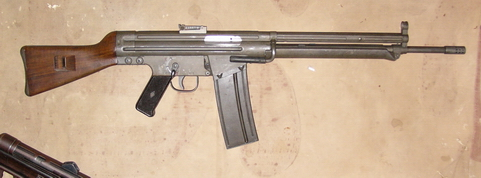
CETME prototype. Note: position of rear sight and bipod folded back to form fore-stock.

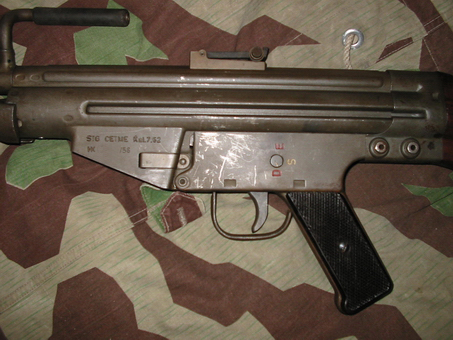
Close-up of CETME prototype. Note: position of rear sight and selector markings.

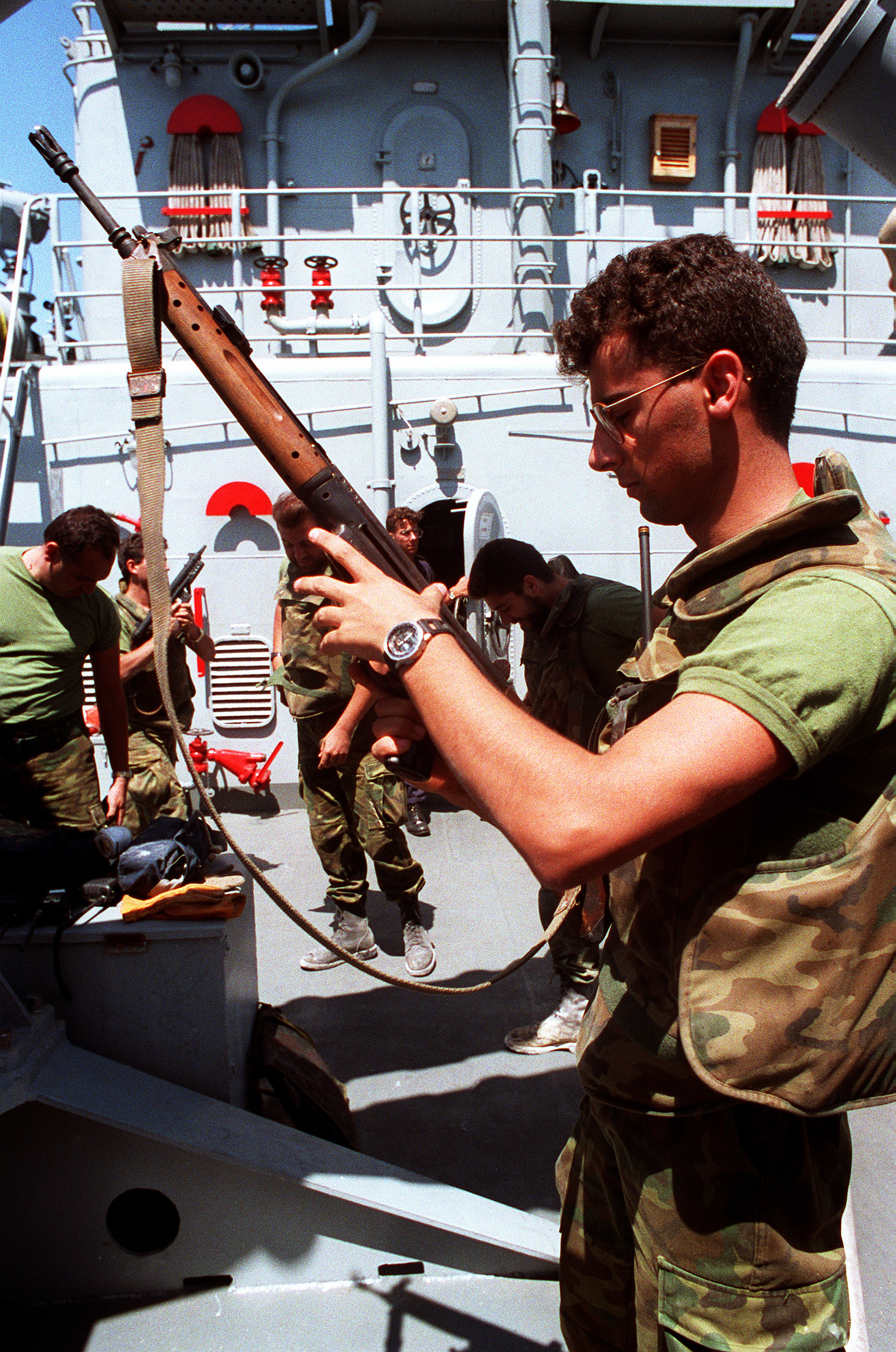
Spanish sailor with CETME 58 Model C

=== Model A ===
The Model As were the developmental prototypes. These models were unusual in that they fired from the closed bolt in semi-automatic and from the open bolt in full-auto mode. Later production models fire from only the closed bolt. The Model As are easily identified by the position of rear sight and bipod folded back to form the fore-stock. In 1954, the rifle saw limited introduction in the Spanish Army. They used the 7.92×41mm CETME.

=== Model B ===
The Model B was the first production model. It had a perforated steel handguard and chambered for the 7.62×51mm CETME round. The 7.62×51mm CETME differed from the standard 7.62×51mm NATO round by having a lighter full-metal-jacketed, plastic-cored lead bullet and a reduced propellant charge. The parts for the Model B are for most part interchangeable with the later Model C rifles.

The Spanish Army adopted a variant of the Model B re-engineered for the more powerful 7.62×51mm NATO round. The reliable functioning of roller-delayed blowback mechanisms is limited by specific ammunition and arm parameters like bullet weight, propellant charge, barrel length and amount of wear. The Model B could be converted to fire the 7.62×51mm NATO round if the bolt group and return spring were replaced with that of the Model C. These modified rifles were known as Model 58-64-C and by 1971 all the Spanish CETME B rifles had been upgraded.

=== Model C ===
The Model C was a lightweight version that was chambered for the 7.62×51mm NATO round and had wooden fore-stocks. The Model C is virtually identical to the Model B. However, certain components had been strengthened to better deal with the increased forces and stress exerted by the application of the standard 7.62×51mm NATO round. It had become the Spanish standard rifle by 1964.

=== Model E ===
The CETME Model E replaced the wooden parts of the stock with plastic and the steel components with aluminium. After a short period on the production line, it was discovered that they were weaker than the previous models and that continuous fire deformed the firearms rapidly. Due to this, relatively few were produced and they were quickly discontinued.

=== Model R ===
The CETME R was a derivative of the CETME B without buttstock, intended to be used aboard armored vehicles.

== Variants ==
=== CETME L and LC ===
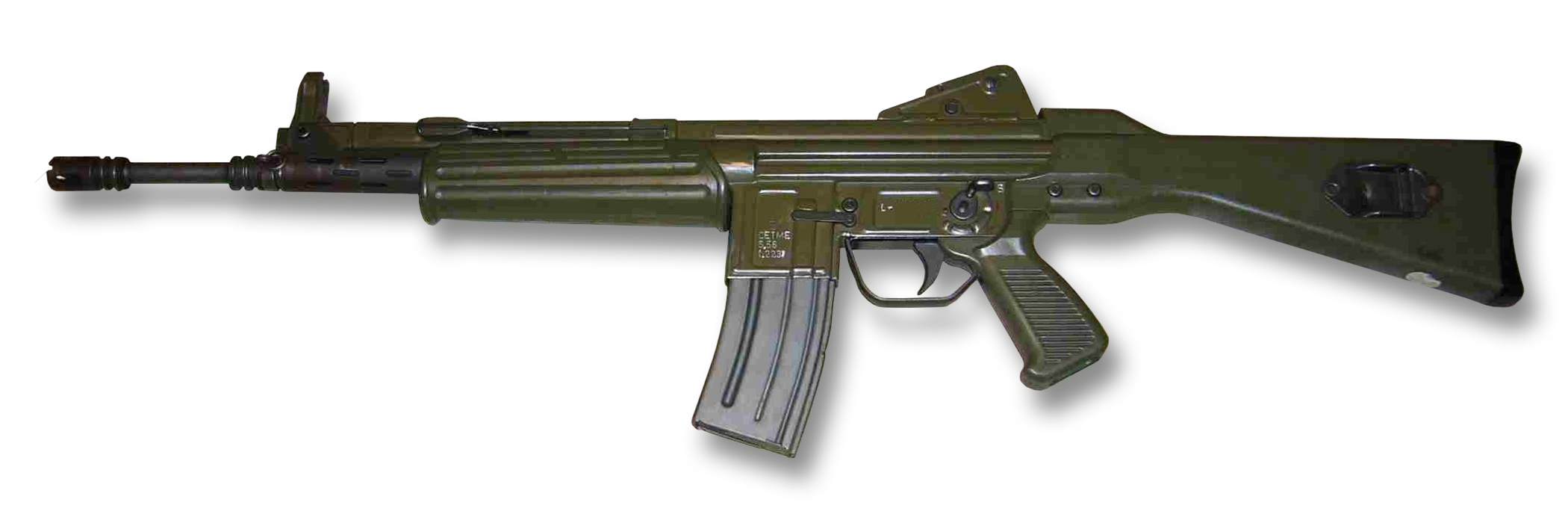
CETME Model L

The CETME Model L was a downsized variant of the CETME system, chambered for the 5.56×45mm NATO cartridge. It was adopted by the Spanish Army in 1984 and was in service until it was replaced by the Heckler and Koch G36 rifle in 1999.

== Civilian versions ==
In the 1960s, the Mars Equipment Corporation of Chicago imported into the USA Spanish-made semiautomatic versions of the CETME B and C rifles. Available accessories included a 1" scope mount, a plastic snap-on rifle cover, and the stock CETME magazine loading tool. The model-B rifles included the standard integrated bipod. These rifles can be identified by a large MARS import mark on the right-hand side along with a prominent "MADE IN SPAIN". They are prized by collectors far above the US-made "parts kit" rifles.

In the late 1990s, Century Arms International (CAI) began offering semiautomatic only civilian versions known as the CETME Sporter, which are manufactured from assembled military surplus and US made parts. Although largely built from Model "C" parts, there have been reports of model "B" parts in the Model "C" Century built rifles.

Due to the restrictions against importing receivers of select-fire weapons, all receivers for these civilian versions are made in the US. Earlier receivers were of cast aluminum, while later receivers were made from stamped and welded steel. Earlier rifles retained the wood furniture of the originals while later examples were available with Heckler & Koch style composite stocks. Due to state and local laws restricting weapons with assault weapon features, earlier models of the CETME Sporter featured a permanently pinned muzzle brake rather than the original flash hider. After the 1994 Assault Weapons ban expired in 2004, Century produced models with a removable muzzle brake. NATO 7.62×51mm ammunition may safely be used in the CETME sporter, while commercial .308 ammunition is not recommended for use due to the tendency of the extractor to tear off the rims of the softer civilian brass. The CETME delayed roller lock design has a violent extraction and ejection process that flings the empty brass far from the weapon. The brass generally cannot be reloaded due to denting during the ejection operation, this is of no consequence when using mil-spec surplus ammunition with Berdan priming.

== Users ==
=== Frontline service ===
- Biafra: Biafran Armed Forces
- Bolivia: 1,500 Model C rifles acquired for army reserves in 2003, in use with Grupo Delta of the Policia Nacional
- Chad
- Republic of the Congo
- People's Republic of the Congo
- Democratic Republic of the Congo
- Djibouti
- Dominican Republic
- France: Commandos Marine used CETME-B rifles seized aboard a smuggling boat during the Algerian War, and kept them in limited service until the 1990s.
- Equatorial Guinea
- Guatemala: Most rifles disposed of in 1981
- Lebanon: Lebanese Armed Forces
- Mauritania
- Nigeria
- Spain
  - Spanish Armed Forces
  - Guardia Civil stored Cetme Model C rifles reintroduced to replace worn out Cetme Model LC rifles
- Zaire

=== Trials only ===
- West Germany: CETME Model A

=== Non state users ===
- PLO
- Sahrawi Republic: Polisario Front

== Gallery ==
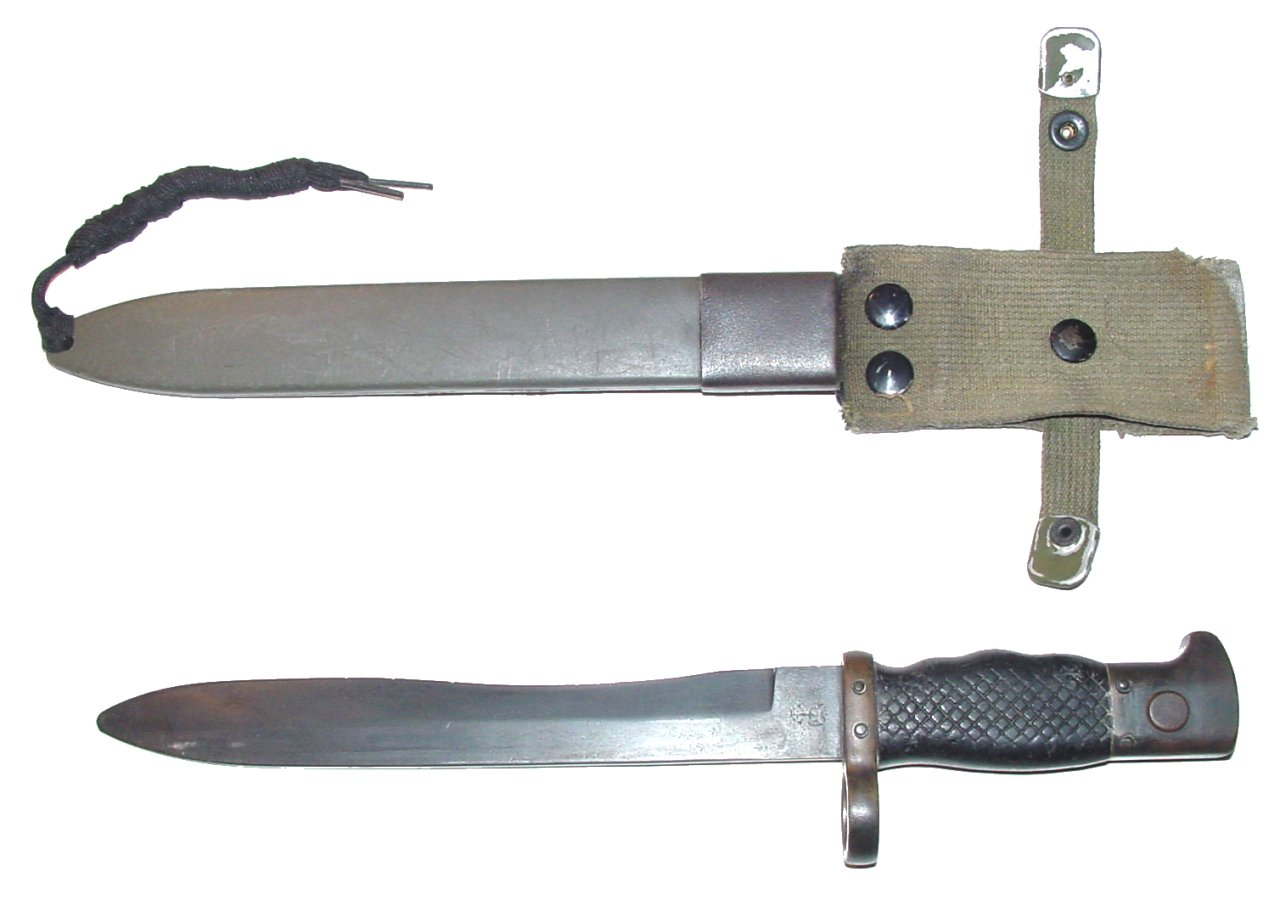
Bayonet for the Cetme Rifle and the FR8 Rifle

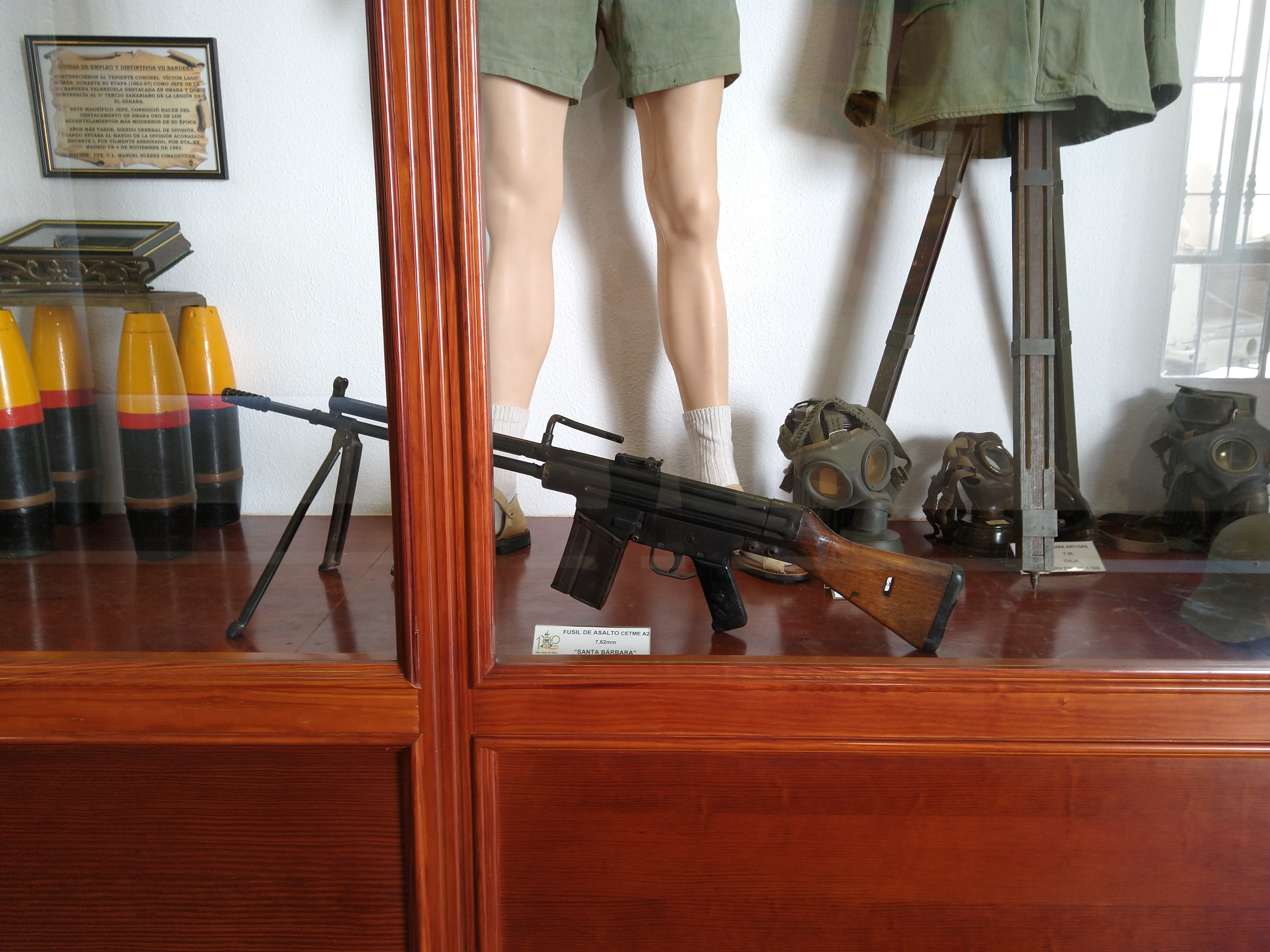
Cetme Rifle in the Museográfica de la Legión en Almería

== See also ==
- Heckler & Koch G41 – Assault rifle produced by Heckler & Koch
- Heckler & Koch HK33 – Assault rifle developed by Heckler & Koch
- Howa Type 64 – Japanese battle rifle
- List of weapons of the Lebanese Civil War

== General and cited references ==
- Manual del soldado de Infantería de Marina (1985). Marine Corps soldier Manual Edited by the Spanish Ministry of Defence.
- Manual de instrucción básica de la Escuela Técnica de Seguridad y Defensa del Aire (ETESDA) (2002). Basic instruction Manual of the Technical School Safety and Air Defence (ETESDA) (2002). Edited by the Spanish Ministry of Defence.
- Centro de Documentación y Publicaciones del Ministerio de Defensa. Publications and Documentation Centre of the Ministry of Defence.
- CETME: 50 años del fusil de asalto español. (CETME: 50 years of Spanish assault rifle). José María Manrique García and Lucas Molina Franco. Edit. La Esfera de los Libros. (The Sphere of Books). ISBN 84-9734-398-0.
- Thompson, Leroy (30 May 2019). The G3 Battle Rifle. Weapon 68. Osprey Publishing. ISBN 9781472828620.
