= FR8 =

Santa Barbara FR 8
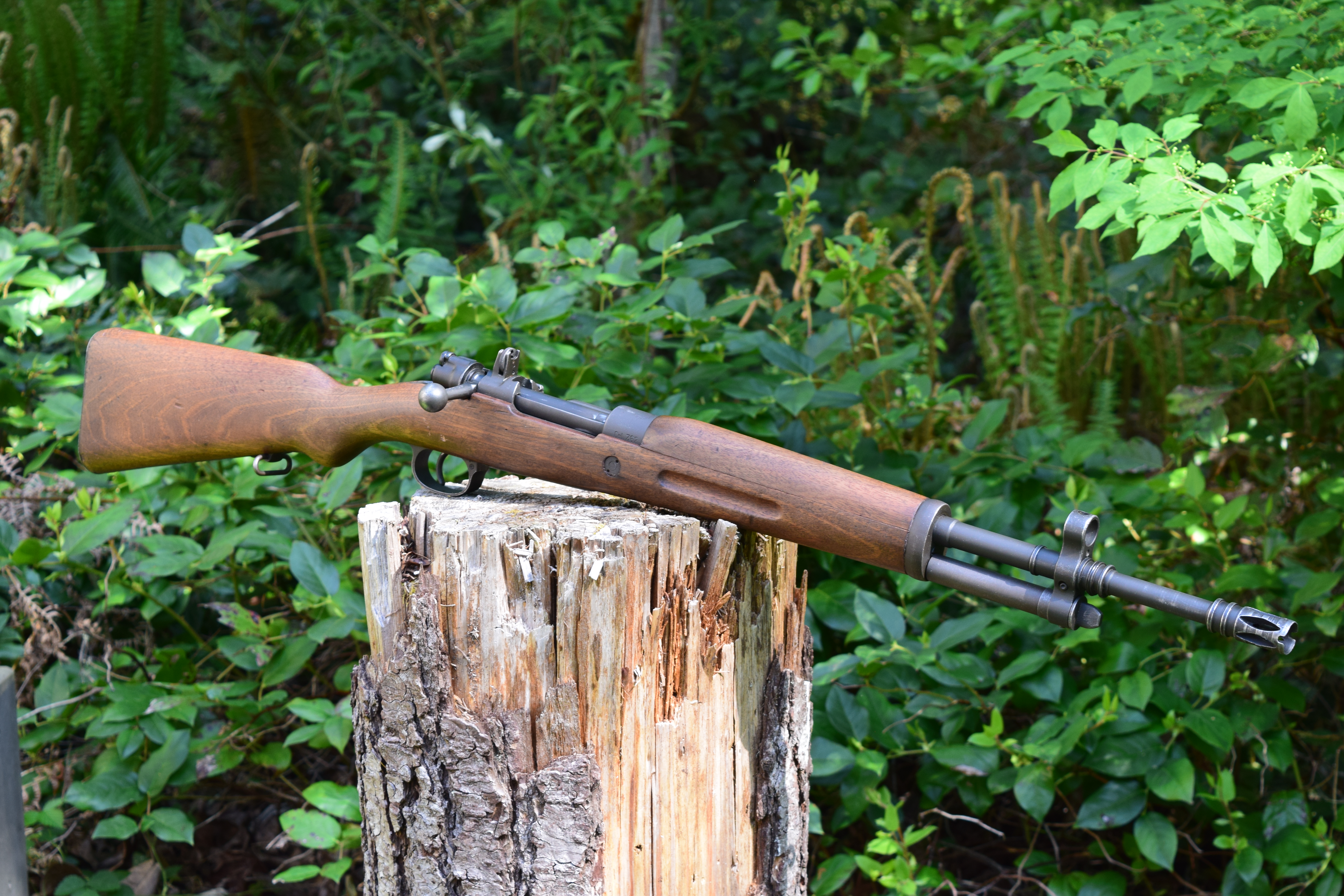
- Type: Service Carbine
- Place of origin: Spain

Service history
- In service: 1950s–1970s

Production history
- Manufacturer: bolt system: Mauser, barrel: CETME or H&K, refitting: Fabrica De Armas La Coruña
- Variants: FR 7, FR 8

Specifications
- Mass: ca. 3,700 grams (8.2 lb)
- Length: 960 millimetres (38 in)
- Barrel length: 470 millimetres (19 in)
- Cartridge: 7.62×51mm NATO (FR7), 7.62×51mm NATO (FR8), k bullet
- Caliber: .308 (7.62 mm)
- Action: Bolt action
- Feed system: 5-round internal magazine
- Sights: 3 diopters or notch (selectable) and front sight

The FR 7 and FR 8 are bolt-action rifles adopted by Spain in the 1950s. The "FR" stands for Fusil Reformado in Spanish ("Converted Rifle" in English). The FR 7 is a variant of the "Spanish M93 Mauser" bolt action while the FR 8 is based on the "Mauser System 98" bolt action. Due to their light weight, short barrel and the calibre used, their recoil and muzzle blast are relatively heavy.

== History ==
The FR7 and FR8 were introduced in the 1950s when the Spanish military was already implementing the CETME automatic rifle, but did not yet have sufficient inventory to equip and train all troops. The rifles were made from existing stockpiles of Mauser bolt-action rifles. The FR-7 was a modification of the Model 1916 short rifle, which in turn was based on the Mauser Model 1893. These three rifles are often referred to as being "small ring" Mausers, as the receiver ring is smaller in diameter than the latter Model 1898 by .110-inch (1.410 inches vs. 1.300 inches). The FR-8 was rebuilt from the Model 1943 short rifle, which was based on the "large ring" Model 1898 Carbine Mauser action(98K). Both rifles were modified to fire 7.62×51mm NATO but the FR-7 uses a low powered variation due to the small rings weaker design. The FR 8 was used well into the 1970s by mounted Guardia Civil units in the Sierra Nevada.

== Features ==
The flash hider was designed to also function as a rifle grenade launcher, compatible with NATO-standard 22 mm rifle grenades. It also has notches in it so that wire could be cut with it by firing a round. The under-barrel tube, which resembles the gas cylinder found on automatic weapons, actually serves as the bayonet mount and as storage for cleaning gear. The rear sight is an elevation-adjustable rotary type with apertures for 200 m (220 yd), 300 m (330 yd) and 400 m (440 yd), as well as an open "V" notch for 100 metres (110 yd). The front sight is elevation-adjustable via a special tool. Operation is identical to the standard Mauser design.

== Images ==
Mauser K98 - Spanish FR 8

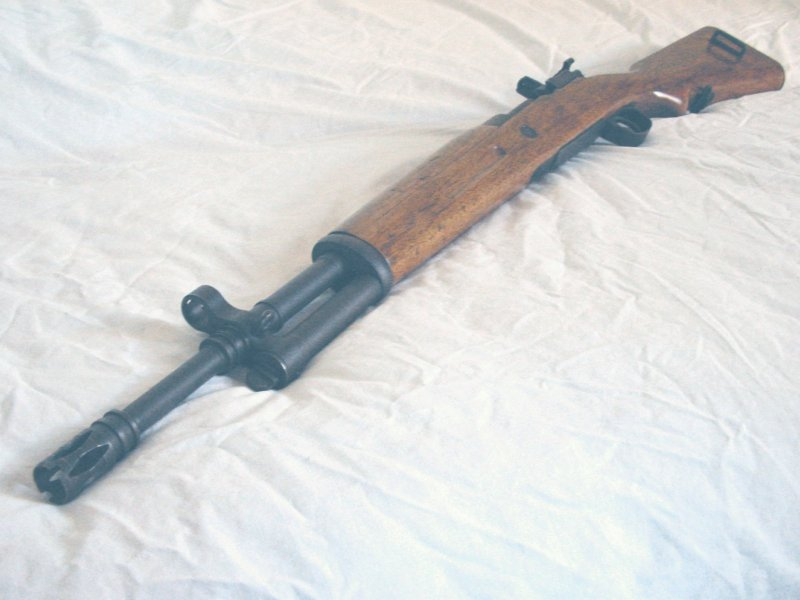
FR 8 - La Coruña

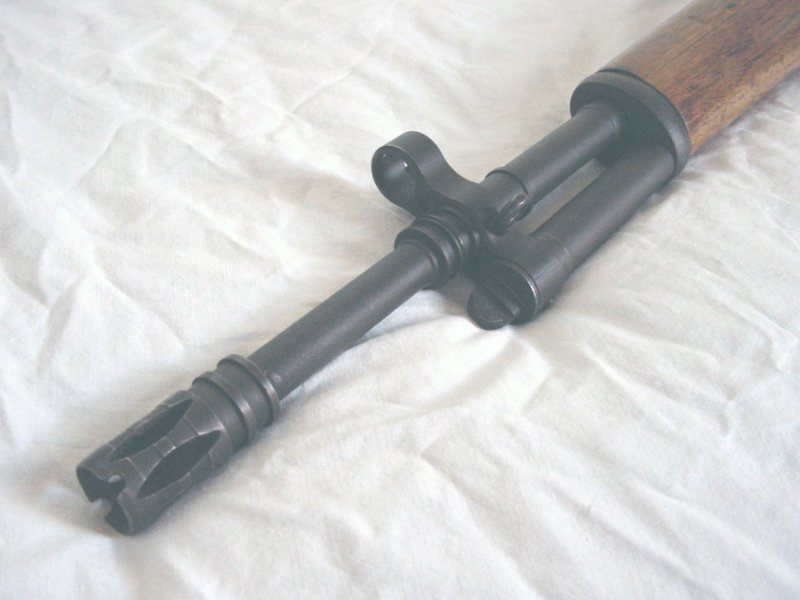
FR 8 - La Coruña

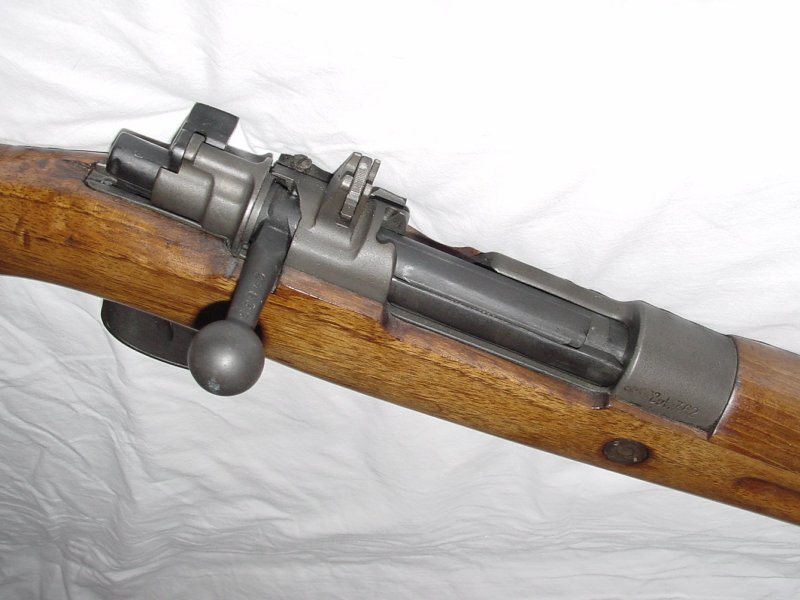
FR 8 - La Coruña

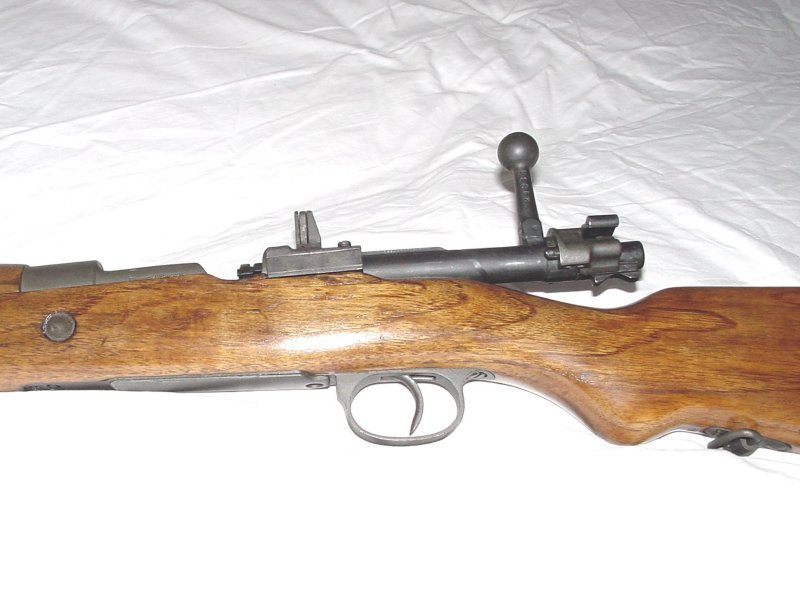
FR 8 - La Coruña

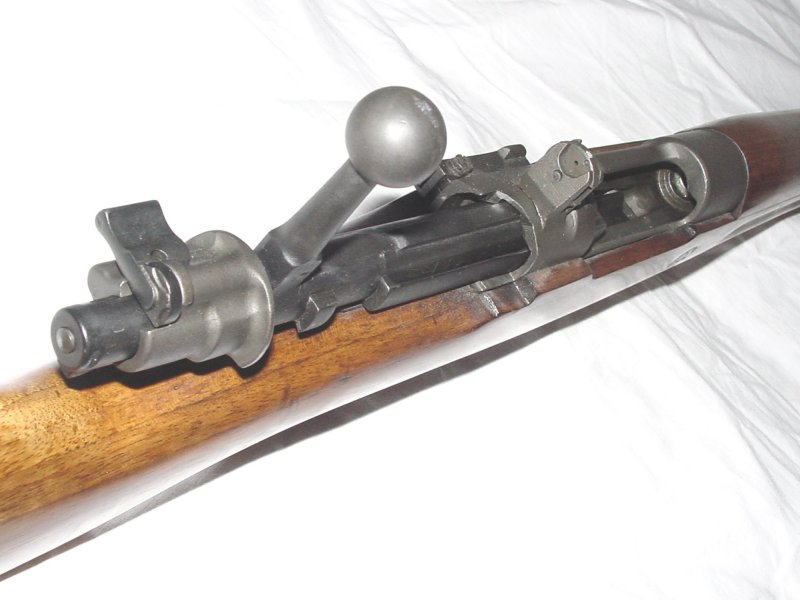
FR 8 - La Coruña

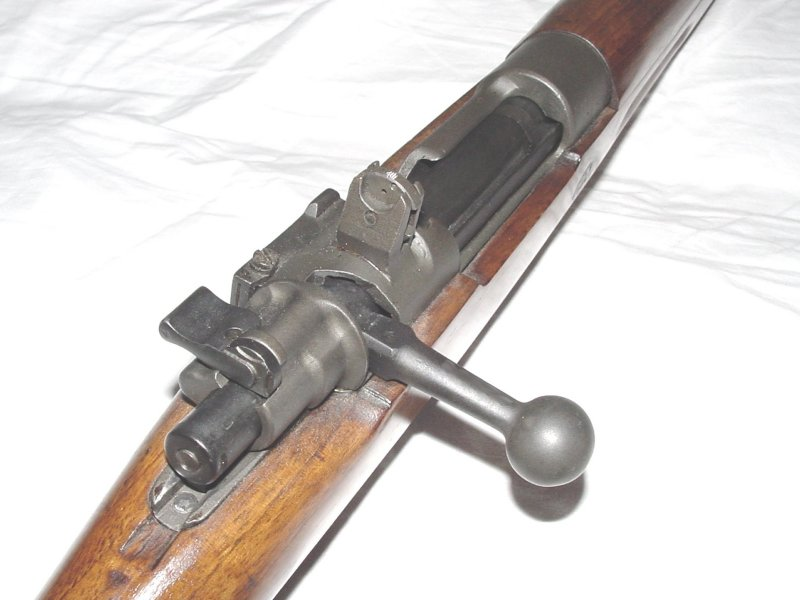
FR 8 - La Coruña

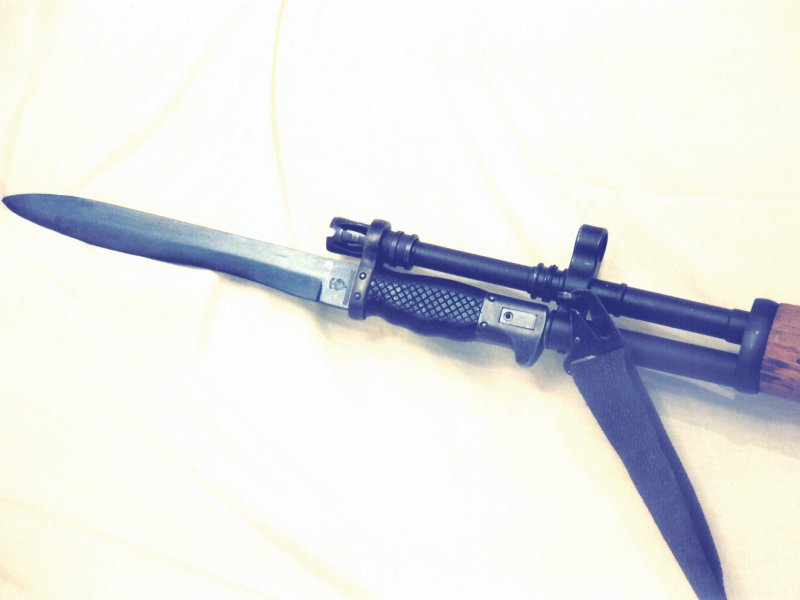
FR 8 - La Coruña

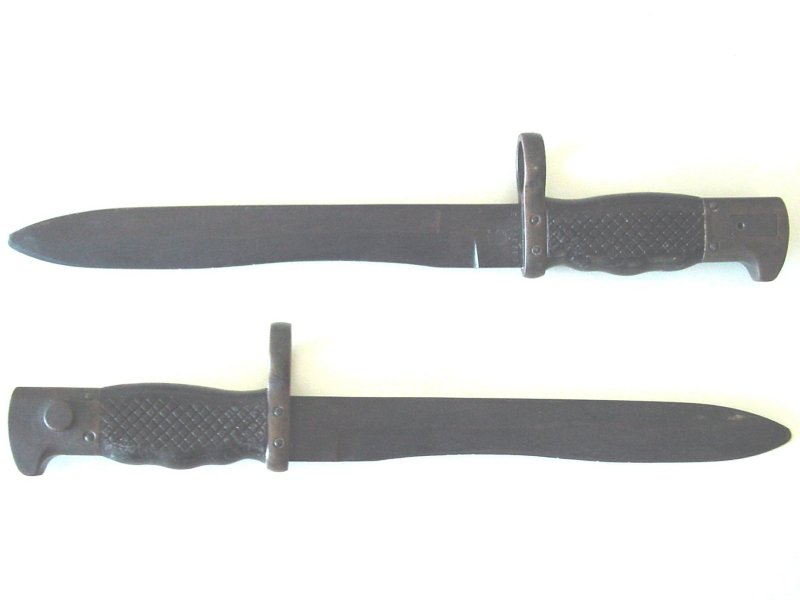
Bayonet FR 8 - La Coruña

== See also ==
- Karabiner 98k
- Mosquefal
