= Over-the-beach capability =

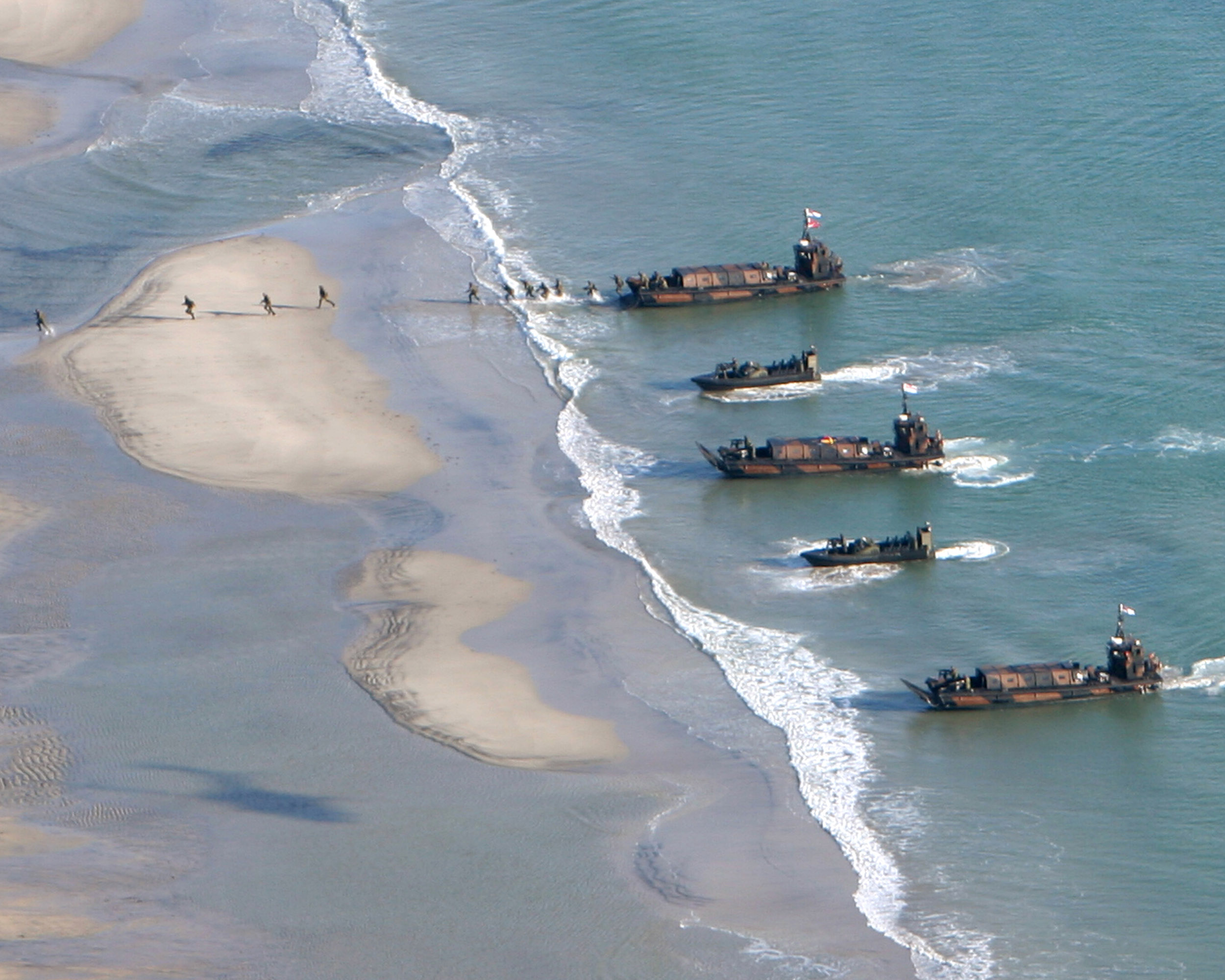
Royal Marines conducting an amphibious warfare exercise

Over-the-beach (OTB) capability is the ability of a military or paramilitary force to launch an effective offensive against a defended coast, or the ability of a firearm to be safely fired immediately after being completely submerged in and taken out of water. The former consists of the number of soldiers, tanks, vehicles, and helicopters that a nation can stage over an adversary's defended coast in a time of war. Generally, these elements only count if they can be projected across hundreds of kilometers of open ocean. Over-the-beach capability determines a nation's power projection together with forward airpower (strength of aircraft carriers and/or overseas airbases), alliances, and nuclear options.

== See also ==
- Amphibious warfare
- Blue-water navy
- Power projection
- Seabasing
- Sea lines of communication
- Glossary of military abbreviations
- List of established military terms
- List of military tactics
