= Star Model Z-45 =

Spanish submachine gun

Z-45
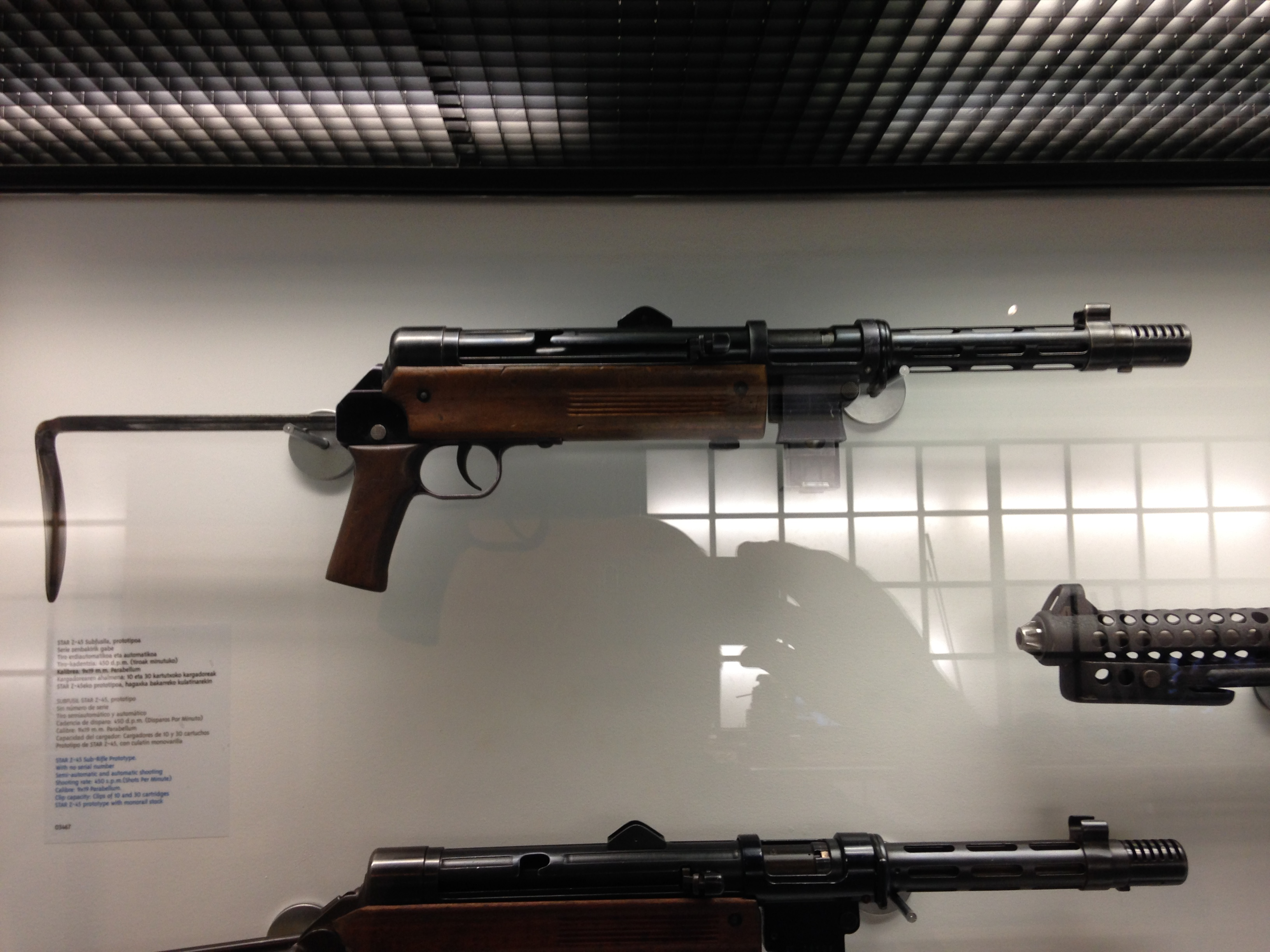
- Star Z-45
- Type: Submachine gun
- Place of origin: Spain

Service history
- In service: 1945
- Used by: See Users
- Wars: Ifni War; Cuban Revolution; Portuguese Colonial War; Rhodesian Bush War; Angolan Civil War

Production history
- Designed: 1942–1945
- Manufacturer: Star Bonifacio Echeverria

Specifications
- Mass: 3.5 kg (7.72 lb) unloaded/4.54 kg (10.01 lb) loaded
- Length: 850 mm (33 in) stock extended/610 mm (24.0 in) stock folded
- Barrel length: 210 mm (8.3 in)
- Cartridge: 9×23mm Largo; 9×19mm Parabellum.38 Super.45 ACP
- Action: Open bolt, Simple blowback operation
- Rate of fire: 450 rounds/min
- Muzzle velocity: 1,250 feet per second (380 m/s)
- Effective firing range: 100–200 m
- Feed system: 10 or 30-round detachable box magazine

The Star Model Z-45 is a Spanish submachine gun manufactured by Star Bonifacio Echeverria, derived from the German MP 40.

== Design ==
The internal mechanisms are similar to the MP 40. Unlike the German version, the Z-45 is a selective fire weapon (full-auto or single shot). The gun was made in both folding stock and wood stock versions. The Z-45 had a fluted chamber to ease extraction with the powerful 9×23mm Largo cartridge. Most Z-45s were issued with a 30-round box magazine, but a short 10-round magazine was available for law enforcement, or for prison forces guarding prisoners.

== Variants ==
Versions chambered in 9×19mm Parabellum, .38 Super and .45 ACP were also produced, since the barrel can be easily removed.

== Service ==
It was designed between 1942 and 1945. The Star Z-45 was adopted by the Guardia Civil in 1945, by the Spanish Police the next year, by the Air Force in 1947 and eventually by the Army in 1948. It was used in combat during the Ifni War against the Moroccan Army of Liberation.

== Users ==
- Angola
- Chile
- Cuba
- Egypt
- Mauritania
- Peru
- Portugal
- Saudi Arabia
- Spain
- Uruguay
- Zimbabwe

== See also ==
- List of submachine guns
