= CETME =

Spanish arms manufacturer

- Company type: Private
- Industry: Firearms
- Founded: 1949
- Headquarters: Oviedo, Asturias, Spain
- Area served: Worldwide
- Key people: Ludwig Vorgrimler, Engineer

CETME (Spanish: Centro de Estudios Técnicos de Materiales Especiales, lit. 'Centre for Technical Studies of Special Materials') is a Spanish government design and development establishment. While being involved in many projects CETME was mostly known for its small arms research and development. The Spanish government hired former semiautomatic weapon designers from the Third Reich for the organization.

The CETME Model 58 and CETME Model L are its most notable projects. CETME also designed the CETME C2 9mm submachine gun, and the CETME Ameli light machine gun in 5.56×45mm NATO.

== Products ==
- 7.62×51mm CETME ammunition
- CETME Ameli
- CETME C2
- CETME Model 58
- CETME Model L

== Sources ==
- Manual del soldado de Infantería de Marina ( 1985 ). Marine Corps soldier Manual Edited by the Spanish Ministry of Defence.
- Manual de instrucción básica de la Escuela Técnica de Seguridad y Defensa del Aire (ETESDA) (2002). Basic instruction Manual of the Technical School Safety and Air Defence (ETESDA) (2002). Edited by the Spanish Ministry of Defence.
- Centro de Documentación y Publicaciones del Ministerio de Defensa. Publications and Documentation Centre of the Ministry of Defence.
- CETME: 50 años del fusil de asalto español . (CETME: 50 years of Spanish assault rifle). José María Manrique García and Lucas Molina Franco. Edit. La Esfera de los Libros. (The Sphere of Books). ISBN 84-9734-398-0.

== See also ==
- List of battle rifles
