= CETME Model L =

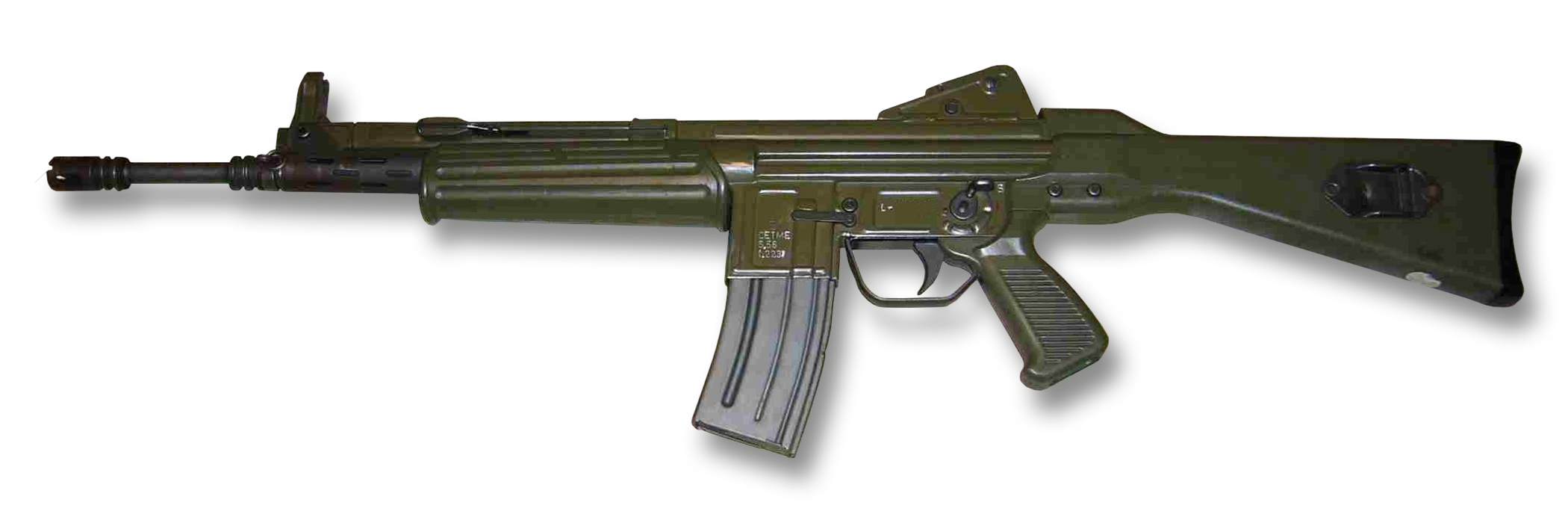
- The CETME Model L
- Type: Assault rifle
- Place of origin: Spain

Service history
- In service: 1987–present
- Used by: Spain, Malawi, Ukraine

Production history
- Designer: CETME
- Designed: 1981
- Manufacturer: CETME
- Produced: 1986–1991
- Variants: Model LC, Model LV

Specifications
- Mass: 3.4 kg (7.50 lb) (Model L); 3.55 kg (7.8 lb)
- Length: 925 mm (36.4 in) (Model L); 860 mm (33.9 in) stock extended / 665 mm (26.2 in) stock collapsed (Model LC)
- Barrel length: 400 mm (15.7 in) (Model L); 320 mm (12.6 in) (Model LC)
- Cartridge: 5.56×45mm NATO
- Action: Roller-delayed blowback
- Rate of fire: 600–750 rounds/min (Model L); 650–800 rounds/min (Model LC)
- Muzzle velocity: 875 m/s (2,871 ft/s) (Model L); 832 m/s (2,729.7 ft/s) (Model LC)
- Effective firing range: 200–400 m sight adjustments
- Feed system: 12, 20, 30-round detachable STANAG magazine
- Sights: Front: shrouded post, rear: flip-up sight with two apertures 440 mm (17.3 in) sight radius

The CETME Model L is a Spanish 5.56×45mm NATO assault rifle developed in the late 1970s at the state-owned small arms research and development establishment CETME (Centro de Estudios Técnicos de Materiales Especiales) located in Madrid. The rifle retains many of the proven design elements the institute had used previously in its CETME Model 58 battle rifles.

The weapon was successfully trialled between 1981–1982 and approved for serial production in 1984 at the Empresa Nacional Santa Bárbara factory (currently Santa Bárbara Sistemas, integrated into General Dynamics European Land Combat Systems division). The Model L replaced the 7.62mm CETME Model C in service with the Spanish Army and the first rifles were delivered in 1987, by which time orders for approximately 60,000 had been placed. From 1999 onwards the Model L has now been largely replaced in Spanish service with a license-built variant of the Heckler & Koch G36E.

== Design details ==
=== Operating mechanism ===
The Model L is a selective fire, roller-delayed blowback firearm. The weapon features a semi-rigid two-piece bolt mechanism that consists of a bolt head and a supporting angular locking piece. During the "unlocking" sequence, the two cylindrical rollers contained in the bolt head are cammed inward against inclined flanks of the barrel extension and act upon the locking piece and bolt carrier, propelling it rearward at a velocity greater than that of the bolt, which remains closed until the fired bullet has left the barrel and pressures inside the bore have been reduced to a safe level before withdrawing together with the bolt carrier.

=== Features ===
The bolt also has a cartridge casing extractor, while the ejector is located inside the trigger housing (the ejector is lifted by a spring in the front of the trigger housing. The recoiling bolt carrier pushes the rear of the ejector down insuring the ejector is lifted into place to insure ejection is timed properly). The weapon is hammer-fired and has a fire control lever, which is also the manual safety. The safety and fire selector lever is located on the left side of the receiver, directly above the pistol grip, and has three settings: "S" (Spanish: Seguro)—weapon safe (trigger is disabled mechanically), "T" (Spanish: Tiro a tiro)—semi-automatic fire and "R" (Spanish: Ráfaga)—fully automatic fire (initial production rifles also had a burst selector option, which was abandoned). The Model L fires from a closed bolt position and uses the NATO-standard 5.56×45mm cartridge loaded with the 62-grain SS109 projectile. INI (Instituto Nacional de Industria, a state factory) made ammunition was dirtier and gave much more chamber pressure than standard NATO ammunition, and was one of the sources of reliability problems (hard primers were in part responsible, too). At NATO joint exercises, foreign units tended to be warned not to use Spanish ammo if their rifles were gas operated.

The rifle's barrel features 6 right-hand grooves and a rifling twist rate of 1 in 178 mm (1:7 in); it is fitted with an open-type 3-prong flash suppressor, and later a "birdcage" style one, both designed to launch rifle grenades. The weapon will also mount a knife-type bayonet.

The Model L's fixed stock, pistol grip and handguard are made of a high-strength lightweight plastic. The rifle strips down into the following components for regular maintenance and cleaning: the receiver, stock, pistol grip and trigger group, handguard, bolt, bolt carrier and recoil mechanism.

Handguards in the first several series were "square" in section (see LC picture), covering from magazine well to front sight. This gave some problems with heat retention, so it was changed to a round "half length" handguard made of thicker plastic, over the full length stamped steel support piece. Almost all military rifles changed to the new handguard, but Guardia Civil rifles retained the squared version.

=== Feeding ===
The rifle feeds from standard NATO magazines that adhere to STANAG-DRAFT 4179 (interchangeable with magazines from the M16 rifle) and have a 30-round capacity, but it can also use short 12-round box magazines, usually only used for parades (early rifles and carbines were also adapted to use special 20 and 30-round magazines that were of an entirely different design).

Issued magazines were steel, but thick walls only gave several problems, like misfeeds, stuck magazines (some could not even be inserted in the rifles), and the like. Although they were supposed to be expendable (a cost of 25 pesetas in 1995), it was forbidden to discard them, and many soldiers were punished for losing a magazine. Spanish soldiers tried to keep magazines known to work well for themselves, or get other STANAG magazines from surplus stores or friends abroad. It was a common sight in NATO joint exercises to see Spanish soldiers searching the zone where US troops discarded their empty mags. Many reliability problems were solved by using these "non-issued" magazines.

=== Sights ===
The CETME Model L is equipped with adjustable iron sights consisting of a forward post (corrected mechanically for elevation) in two versions "thick" and "thin" (no official designation). Thin post was better for precision shooting, but it could easily bend if hit. Since it was well protected this wasn't much of a problem, and it was preferred over the thicker version. A flip-up rear sight with two settings for firing at distances of 200 and 400 m (early models had a rotating drum rear sight that provided 100, 200, 300 and 400 m sighting range apertures). The Model LV (Visor) is a marksman variant equipped with a fixed STANAG mount over the rear sight base; the optic generally used in this role is a nationally produced 4 power ENOSA scope. A starlight scope was also available. An alternate version of the LV was produced for the Spanish Marines. It was equipped with a dovetail mount for the British SUSAT scope. There was a removable flip rear sight that could be used on this version as well. Another model with a rotating drum rear sight used by the Infanteria de Marina was also called LV, leading to some confusion, even in training manual and logistics. The standard rear sight base has a horizontal pin forward, and a circular shallow cavity behind were a detachable scope base could be mounted, but almost never used since not many of these bases were made for general use.

=== Accessories ===
Standard equipment supplied with the rifle includes a cleaning kit, sling, bayonet, lightweight bipod, blank-firing adaptor, rifle grenade launcher guide and magazine loader tool.

== Variants ==
A variant of the Model L is the Model LC carbine that has a short barrel and a collapsible metal shoulder stock, making it particularly suitable for officers, special forces and riot police. These features also allow a high degree of movement in closed spaces or moving vehicles. This carbine version however cannot be used with a bayonet or rifle grenades.

Another variant of the Model L is found in the United States; as a fully automatic firearm, it cannot be imported as a machine gun for civilian sale. However, if the receivers are cut in compliance with BATFE rules, all the parts may be imported, and the rifle reassembled from a new US receiver. Some are professionally built for the US civilian market; some are home-made, with home builders purchasing stamped flats of the receivers and bending and welding the receivers themselves.

MarColMar Firearms LLC makes a civilian legal CETME L for sale in the United States. Utilizing a brand new receiver, a new cold-hammer-forged 1 in 7 and nitrided barrel, Cerakote Elite finish, brand new furniture, and a re-engineered spring package, the remaining original parts sets are used to construct the finished product. The rifle has also been designed to utilize the commonly available NATO STANAG M-16/AR-15 magazine. The CETME L, along with the LC, LV, and LV/S variants are all finished in Spanish green, black, FDE, or grey.

== Users ==
- Malawi
- Spain
- Ukraine

== Gallery ==
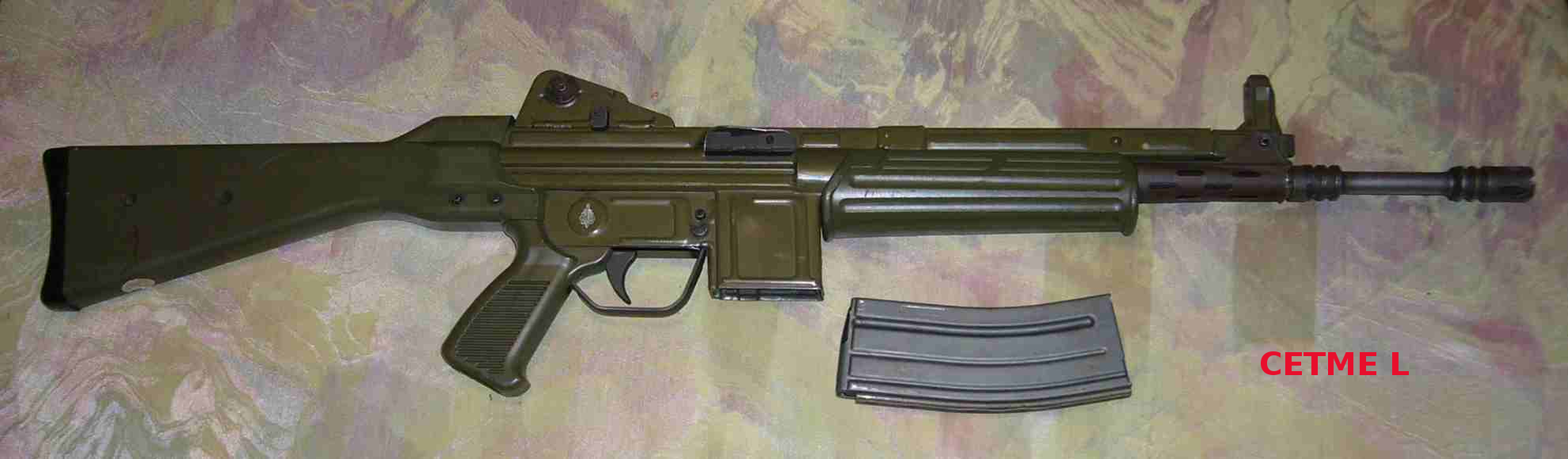
Right side view CETME L

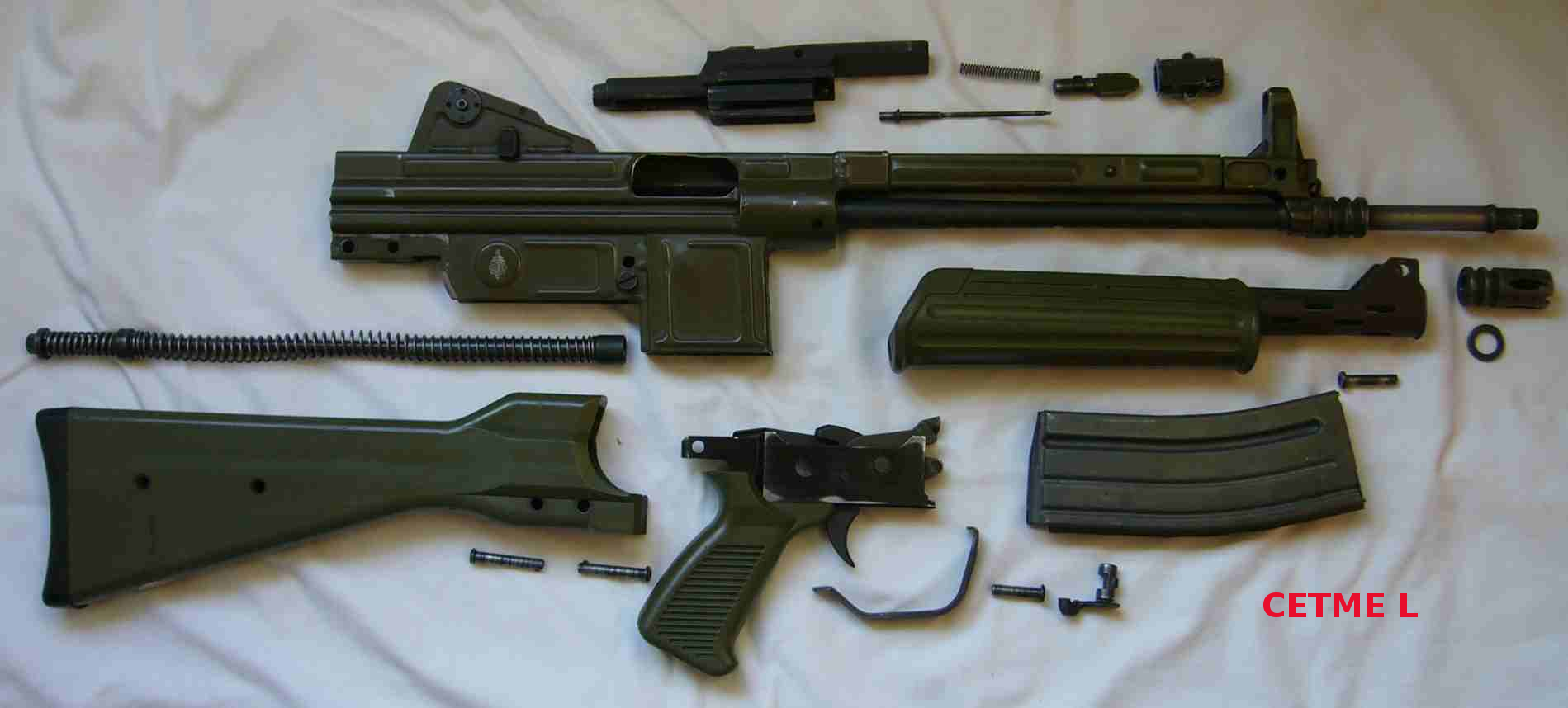
CETME L basic components

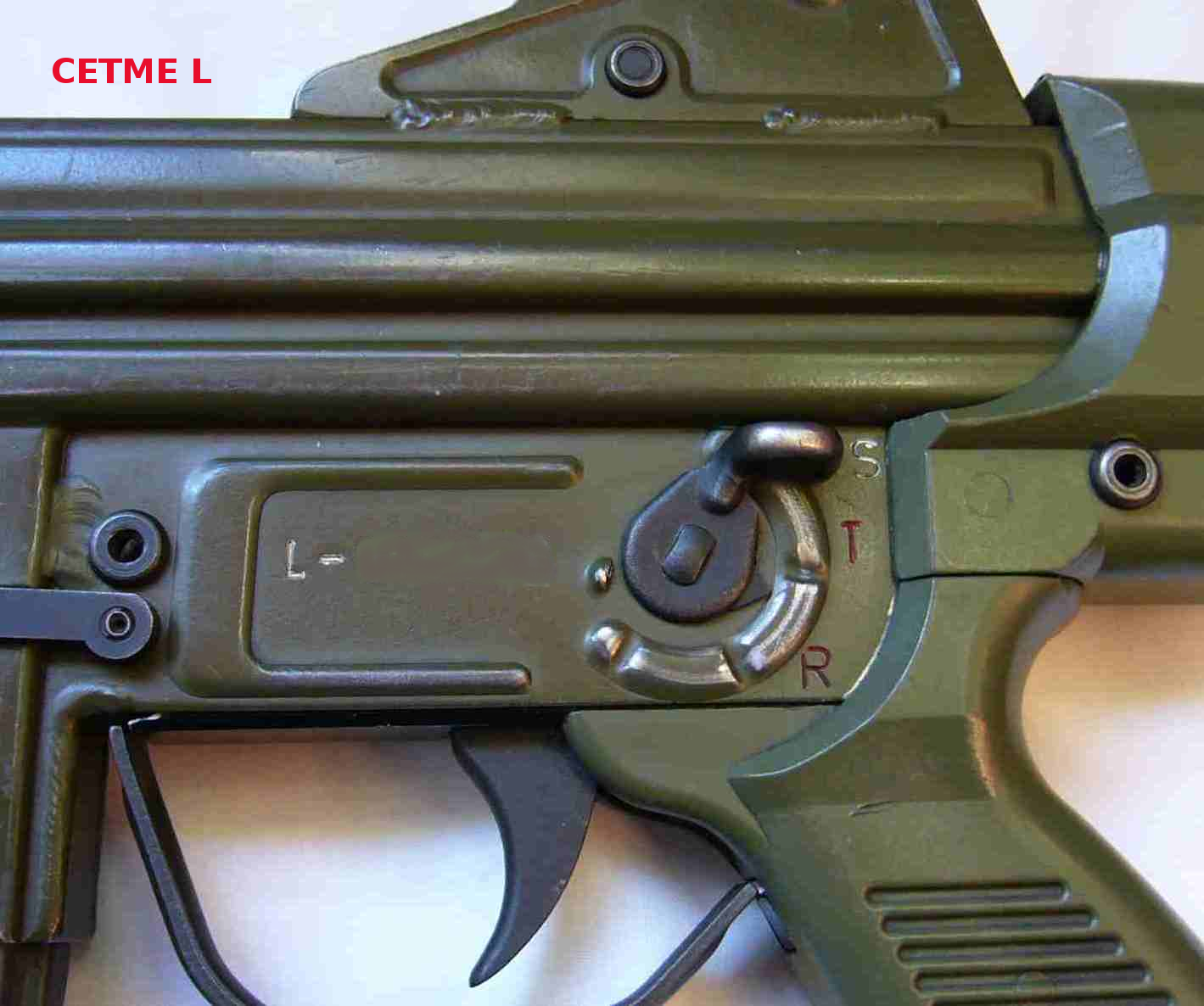
Selector lever positions

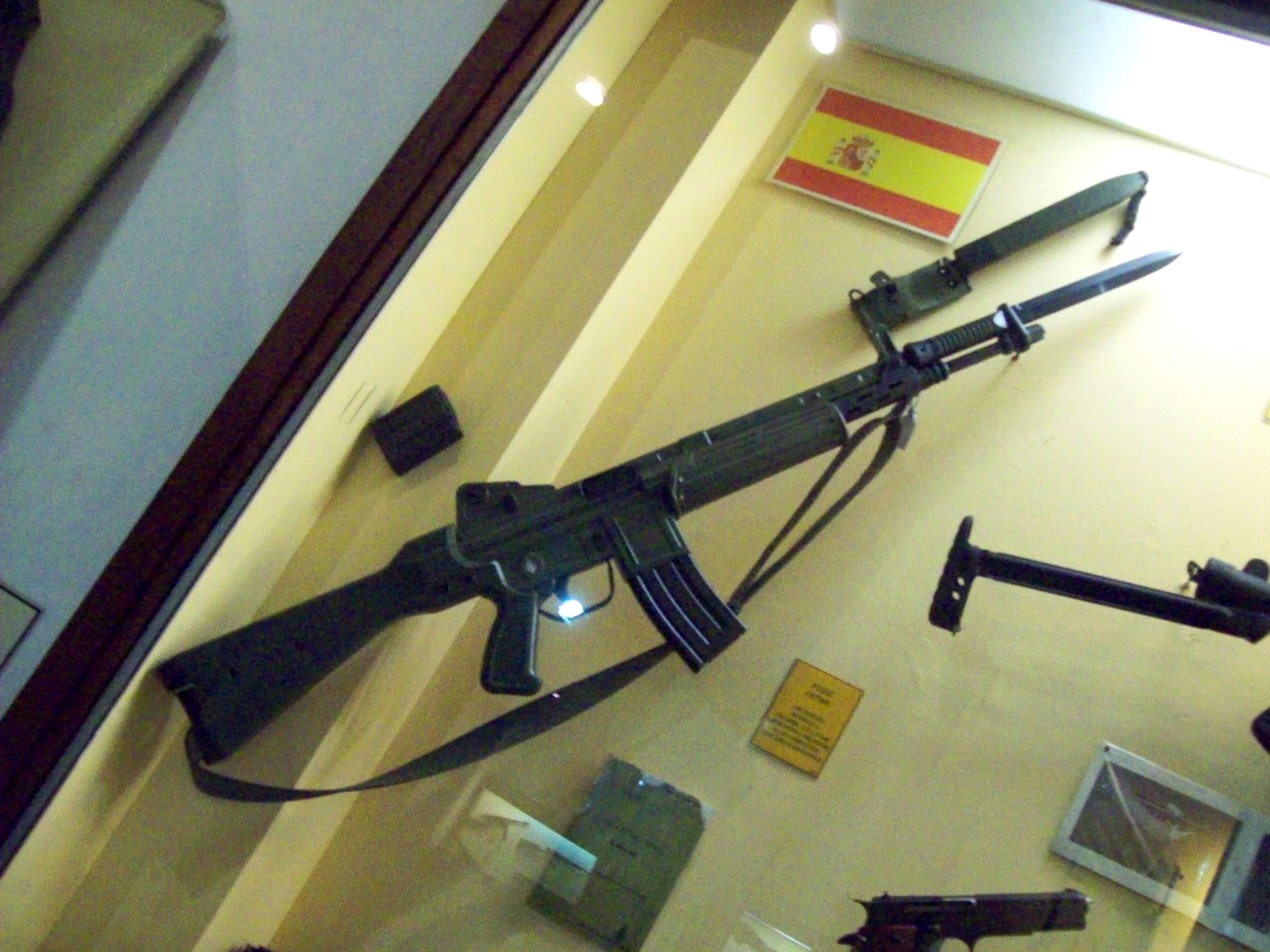
CETME L with bayonet

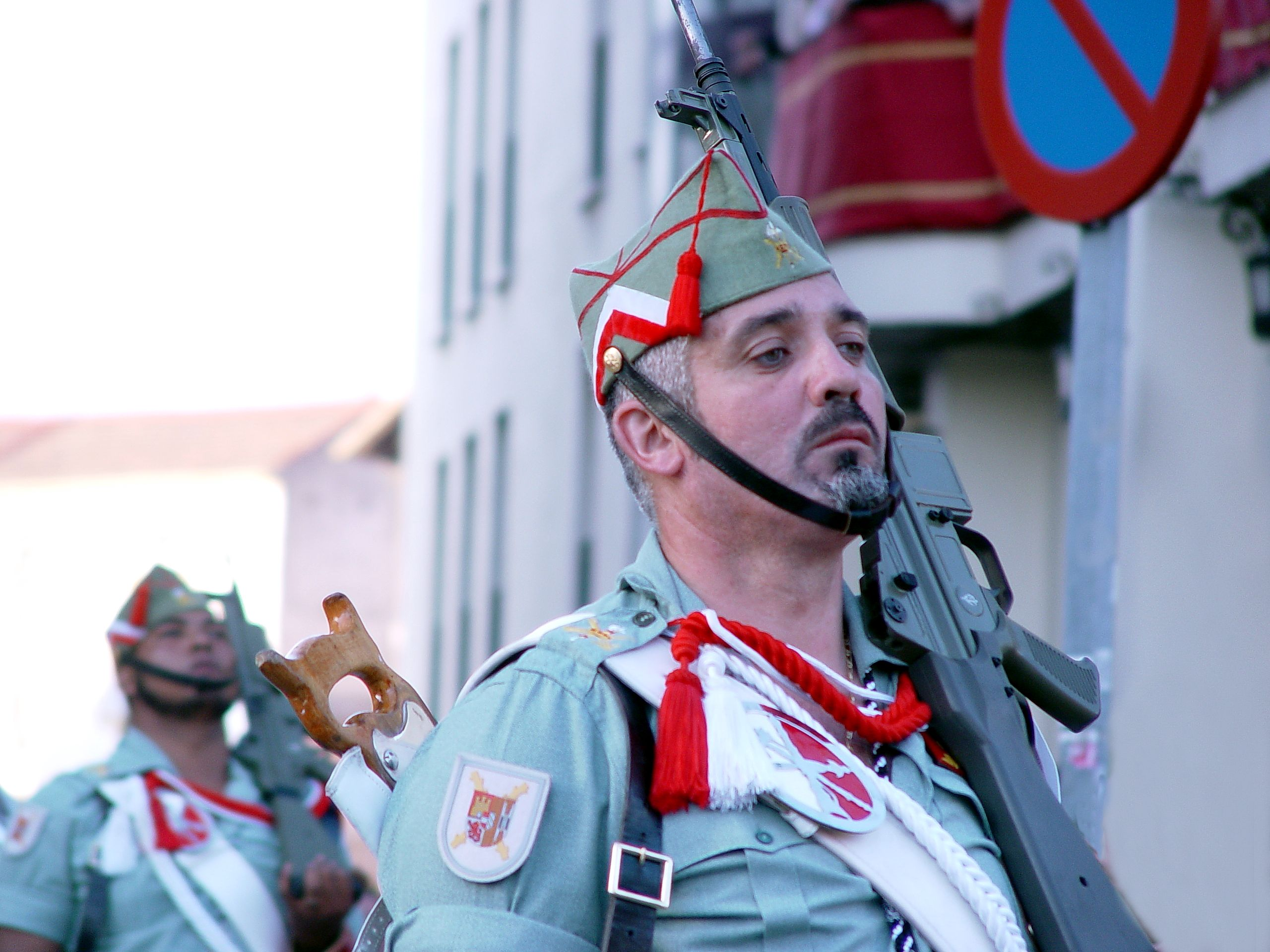
Spanish Legionnaire with CETME L.

== See also ==
- Franchi mod. 641
- Heckler & Koch HK33
- Heckler & Koch G41

== Bibliography ==
- Walter, John (2006). Rifles of the World (3rd ed.). Iola, WI: Krause Publications. ISBN 978-0-89689-241-5.
- Woźniak, Ryszard (2001). "p. 142-143". Encyklopedia najnowszej broni palnej - tom 1 A-F (in Polish). Warsaw, Poland: Bellona. ISBN 83-11-09149-8.
