= Sanaa (disambiguation) =

Sanaa, or San'a' (Arabic: صَنْعَاء Ṣanʿāʾ), is the capital of Yemen.

Sanaa may also refer to:

- Sanaa Governorate, a governorate of Yemen
- Sanaa International Airport
- Sanaa manuscript
- San'a' (patrol vessel), a Yemeni patrol vessel
- Sanaa University, a Yemeni university
- Sanaa, a genus of insects in the subfamily Pseudophyllinae

== People ==
- Sanaa (سناء Sanāʼ /sanaːʔ/), a mostly feminine Arabic language name
- Sanaa (ثناء Thanāʼ [sæˈnæːʔ]), an Egyptian transcription for a mostly masculine Arabic language name
- Sanaa Altama (born 1990), male French football player
- Sanaa Atabrour (born 1989), female Moroccan taekwondo practitioner
- Sanaa Benhama, female Moroccan athlete
- Sanaa Bhambri (born 1988), Indian tennis player
- Sanaa Ismail Hamed (born 1984), Egyptian beauty pageant contestant
- Sanaa Hamri (born 1975), Moroccan music and film director
- Sanaa Gamil (1930–2002), Egyptian actress
- Sanaa Lathan (born 1971), American actress

== Acronyms ==
- SANAA, a Japanese architecture firm
- SANAA, the national utility for water supply and sanitation in Honduras

== See also ==
- Sana (disambiguation)
- Saana (given name), list of people with a similar name
- Sanae
- Sanna
