= Sanna =

Sanna can refer to:

== Places ==
- Sanna, Nordland, an island in Træna municipality, Nordland county, Norway
- Sanna, Ardnamurchan, a village in the far west of Scotland
- Sänna, a village in Rõuge Parish, Võru County, Estonia
- Sanna (Inn), a river in Austria, a tributary to the Inn
- Sanna (Vistula), a river in Poland, a tributary to the Vistula

== People ==
- Sanna (name), including a list of people with this given name
- Simone Sanna, an Italian Grand Prix motorcycle road racer
- King Sanna, a Javanese king that ruled Java circa early 8th century CE

== Other ==
- Sanna (dish), a spongy rice cake, a Goan dish
- Samjna, the Buddhist term (Sanskrit; Pali: sañña) meaning "perception"
- Sanna 77, a type of submachine gun
- Sanna, the native name of Cypriot Maronite Arabic
- Sanna, an alternate name for Sedna (mythology)#Sanna

== See also ==
- Sana (disambiguation)
- Sanaa (disambiguation)
