= Sanna 77 =

South African submachine gun

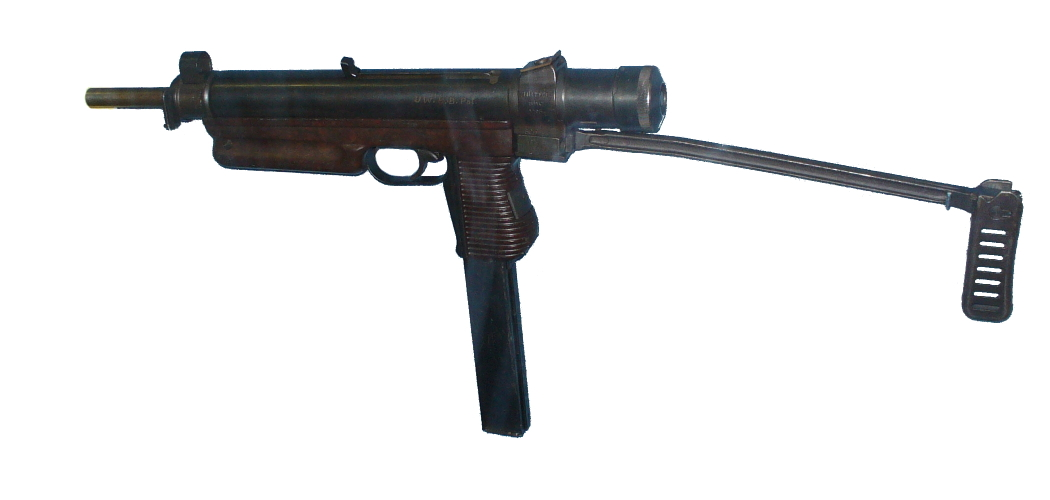
- Sanna 77 Image is a CZ Model 25 to represent the identical weapon
- Type: Submachine gun / Land Defence Pistol
- Place of origin: Rhodesia; South Africa

Service history
- Used by: Irish National Liberation Army; Rhodesia
- Wars: Rhodesian Bush War

Production history
- Designed: 1970s
- Produced: 1977–1980

Specifications
- Mass: 2.8 kg
- Length: 450 mm (650 mm with open stock)
- Barrel length: 290 mm
- Cartridge: 9×19mm Parabellum
- Caliber: 9×19mm Parabellum
- Feed system: 40-round box magazine

The Sanna-77 (from South Africa) is the end of a line of submachine guns which can trace their existence and lineage to the days of Rhodesia and their Unilateral Declaration of Independence in 1965.

== History ==
The small landlocked Rhodesian state faced international sanctions and an arms-embargo from 1965 as well as guerrilla warfare from 1966 and so began producing their own arms. Having been supplied a quantity of the now ubiquitous Uzi submachine gun, Rhodesia set up facilities to produce a similar sub-gun based on the CZ-25 which incidentally was also the inspiration for the Uzi.

The first attempt was the LDP, which was taken from the initials of the manufacturing firm (Lacoste Engineering) and the engineer/designer (Alex DuPlessis), although many Rhodesians felt that it stood for "Land Defence Pistol". The LDP was strikingly based upon the CZ or Vz-25 series of sub-guns, which was the first to have a telescoping bolt and a magazine situated inside the pistol grip of the weapon.

It is unknown when its production was transferred from Rhodesia to South Africa, but it appears that some production began in the early 1970s. The name changed to the Kommando-LDP, the Kommando making extensive use of plastics in the frame. The Kommando was tested as a potential submachine gun for use with "Counter-Terror Forces" as well as having a semi-auto version for civilian use with a three-round burst facility. However the Kommando, which used an Uzi magazine, proved somewhat unreliable as the selector would sometimes trip between semi-, burst- or full-auto mode. It essentially failed as both a civilian product as well as a military one, the South African Defence Force using either the Israeli Uzi or the locally South African produced Milkor BXP submachine gun.

Dogged by unreliability, legislative restrictions on licences and being no more than a heavy semi-auto pistol, the Sanna-77 was a commercial failure. The Sanna-77 has long since ceased to be produced and is no longer commercially available.

== Description ==
The Sanna-77 was of all metal construction, unlike the plastic framed Kommando LDP, and has the magazine in the grip and a folding metal stock. The front sight was hooded and the cocking handle located high on the left side of the receiver. The Sanna-77 is not really a submachine gun, being made for civilian use only and therefore, due to legal restrictions, only available in the semi-auto mode of fire. It is therefore better termed a pistol-caliber carbine rather than a submachine gun.

== See also ==
- Cobra Carbine
