= Sana =

Sana or SANA may refer to:

== Places ==
- Sanaa, the capital of Yemen
- Sana (river), a river in Bosnia and Herzegovina
- Sana, Bhutan, a town in Bhutan
- Sana, Haute-Garonne, a commune in France
- Sana, Iran, a village in Iran
- Sana, Mali, a commune in Mali
- Saña District, in Peru

== People ==
=== Surname ===
- Alizata Sana or Adiza Sanoussi, Burkinabé novelist
- André Sana (1920–2013), Iraqi Chaldean Catholic hierarch
- Ayako Sana (born 1985), Japanese volleyball player
- Ayesha Sana (born 1972), Pakistani TV actress
- Eléonor Sana (born 1997), Belgian skier
- Faad Sana (born 2003), Togolese footballer
- Jimmy De Sana (1949–1990), American artist
- Mama Sana (1900–1997), Malagasy singer and zither player
- Shanoor Sana (born 1971), Indian actress and model
- Tobias Sana (born 1989), Swedish footballer

=== Given name ===
- Sana (singer) (born 1996), Japanese singer in South Korean girl group Twice
- Sana, Japanese singer with the rock group Sajou no Hana
- Sanna Ejaz or Sana Ijaz, Pakistani-Pashtun human rights activist
- Sana Fakhar or Sana or Sana Nawaz (born 1979), Pakistani film actress and model
- Sana Khan or Sana Khaan (born 1988), Indian actress, model and dancer
- Sana Makbul (born 1993), Indian actress and model
- Sana Takeda (born 1977), Japanese illustrator

== Other uses ==
- Sana (dairy product), a Romanian fermented milk drink
- Syrian Arab News Agency, the official Syrian news agency
- SANA (drug), an experimental weight loss drug
- Società Anonima Navigazione Aerea (SANA), an Italian airline active 1926–1934
- Operation Sana, a 1995 military offensive in Bosnia
- Sana Kurata, a character in manga series Kodomo no Omocha
- RTV Sana, a Bosnian television channel
- Yugo Sana, a budget compact car

== See also ==
- Sanaa (disambiguation)
- Sanae
