= Yemen Coast Guard =

Yemeni Coast Guard
- Racing Stripe of the Yemeni Coast Guard
- Active: 2003–present
- Country: Yemen
- Branch: Yemeni Navy
- Type: Coast guard
- Garrison/HQ: Mukalla

Commanders
- Current commander: Major General Khalid al-Qamali

The Yemeni Coast Guard is the coast guard service of Yemen and was founded in 2003. It has constabulary and navigation role in Yemen's ports and regional waters, as the country has 2,000 kilometres (1,200 mi) of coastline. Since the start of the Yemeni civil war in 2015, the Coast Guard functions under the internationally recognised government backed by the Saudi Arabian-led coalition. Several ports and coastal facilities in areas controlled by the Saudi-backed government of Yemen are under the authority of the Yemeni Coast Guard, which has its headquarters in Mukalla.

== Role and organisation ==
The Coast Guard's duties include anti-piracy, countering illegal immigration, countering smuggling, and maritime patrol. The Yemen Post reports that Yemeni Coast Guard forces have engaged in combat with corrupt elements of other Yemeni security organs. According to the Wall Street Journal shipping firms can hire US trained Yemeni Coast Guard personnel to help guard their vessels during their transit of Yemeni waters.

Since the start of the Saudi intervention in Yemen in 2015, the Coast Guard has cooperated with the naval forces section of the Joint Forces Command. The Coast Guard's area of responsibility is divided into sectors based on the country's governorates.

United Nations Security Council Resolution 2722 (10 January 2024), agreed in the context of Houthi attacks on shipping in the Red Sea, called on the international community to support the work of the Yemeni Coast Guard.

== Ships ==
Some of its fleet were formerly United States Coast Guard vessels, or were built to the same design as USCG vessels. Since 2015, the Coast Guard also includes boats and equipment provided by Saudi Arabia, which gave Yemen 37 boats.

== Incidents ==
On 13 March 2017, two people were killed when a Coast Guard ship was struck by a mine that was left by Houthi forces.

== Gallery ==
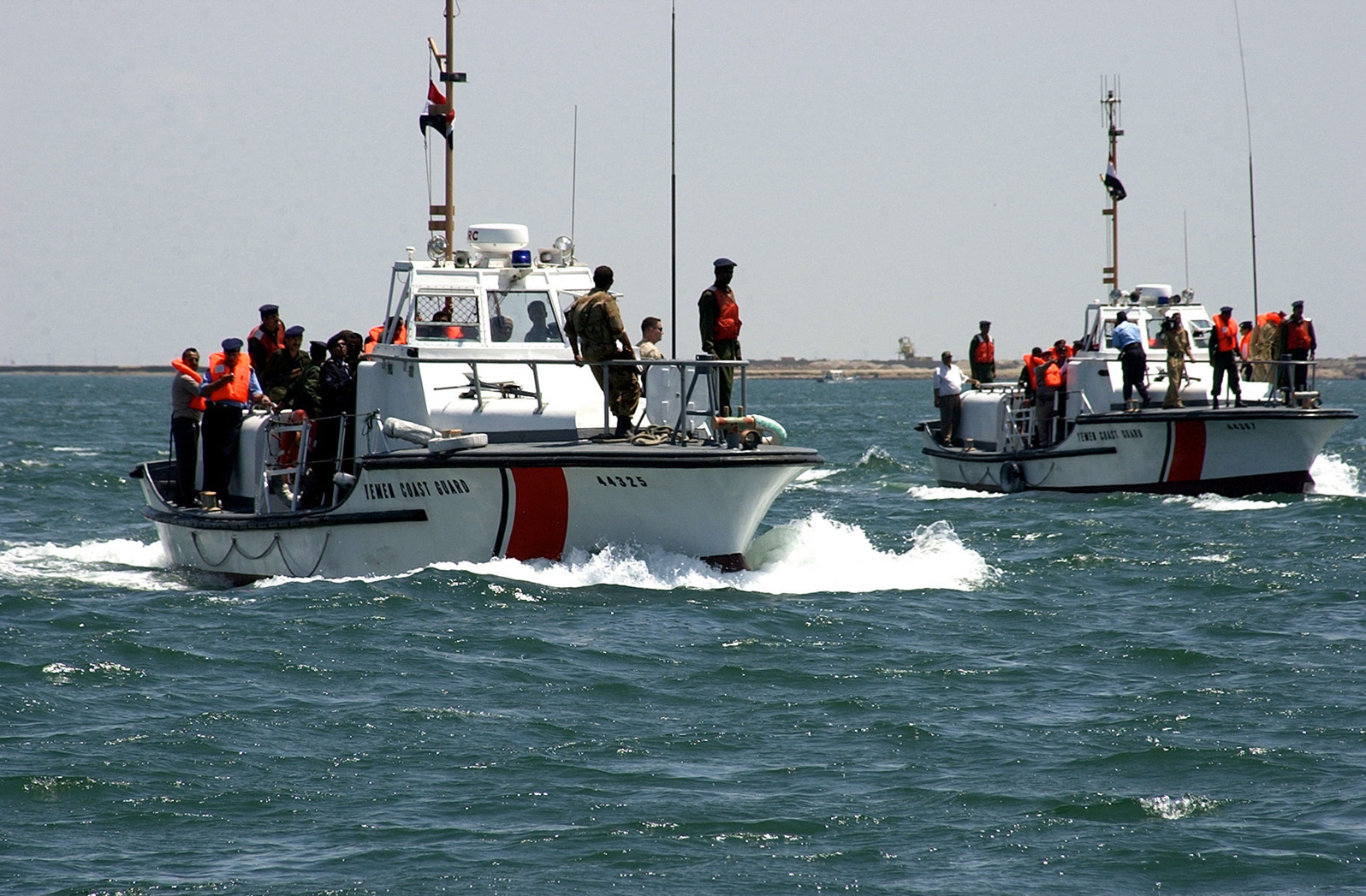
A pair of 44-foot Motor Life Boats (MILB) during a commissioning ceremony for the Yemen Coast Guard after being transferred from the US Coast Guard

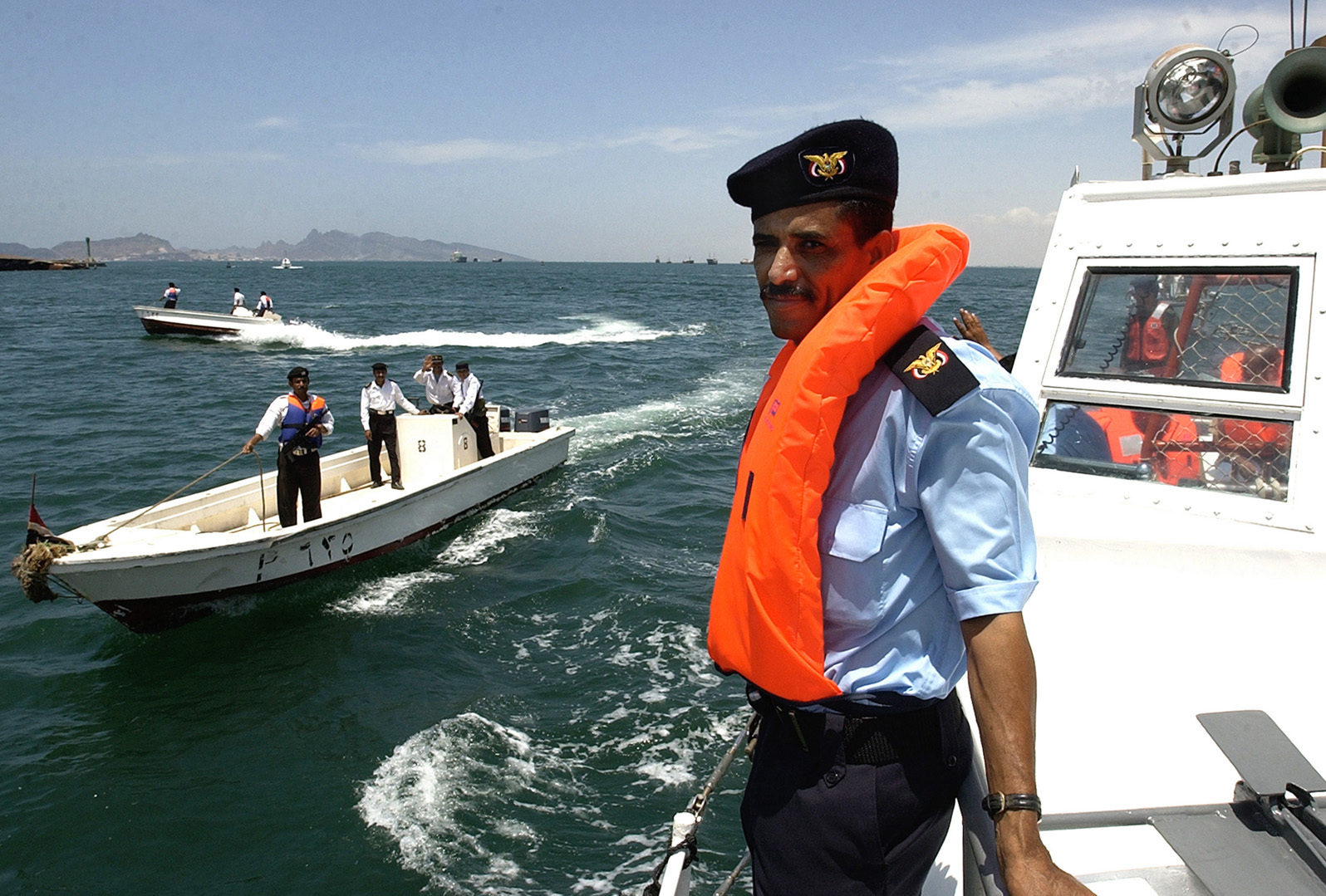
Yemeni Coast Guard sailor in 2004

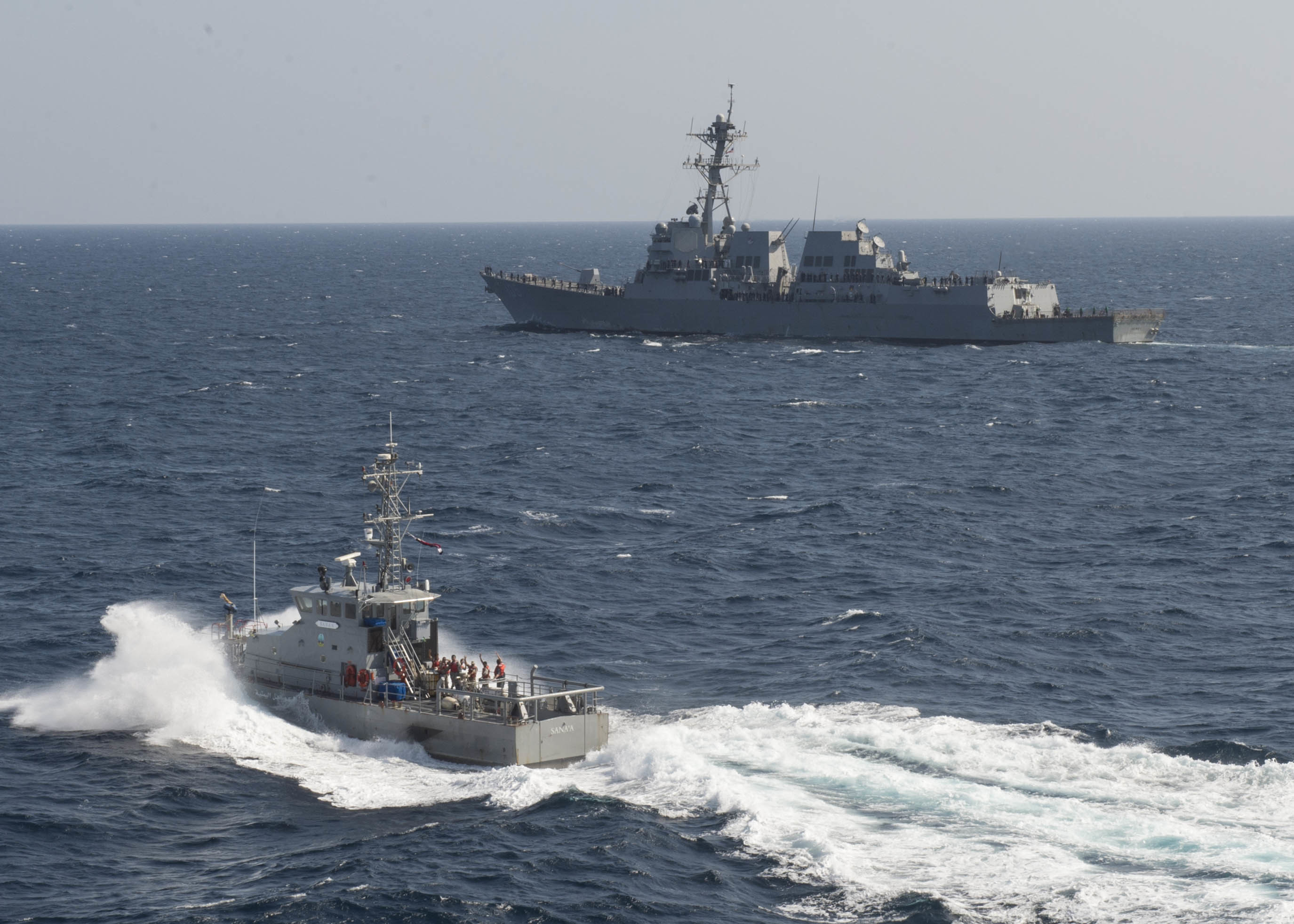
Yemen Coast Guard patrol boat Sana'a and USS Dewey transit the Red Sea in 2014

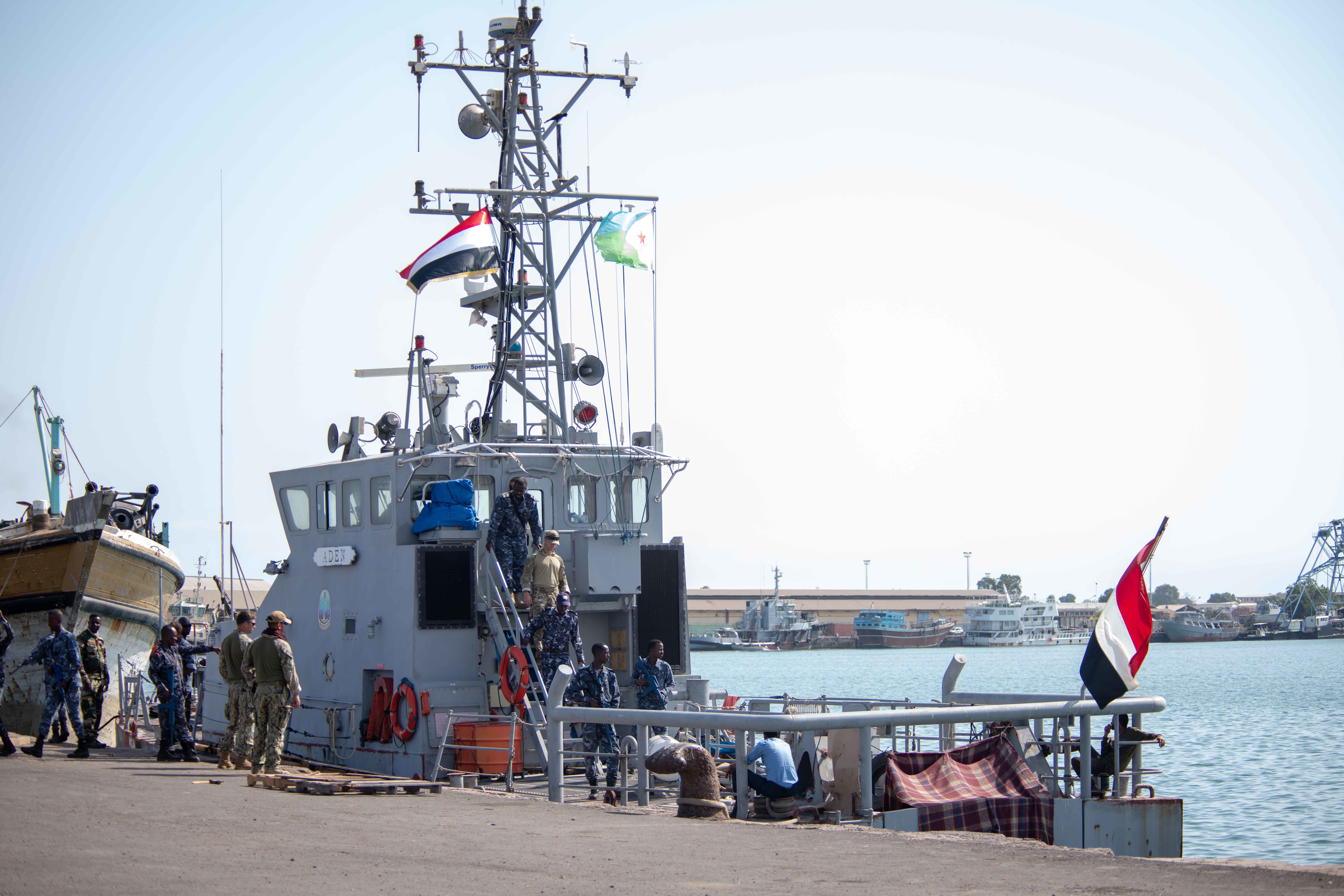
Patrol boat Aden

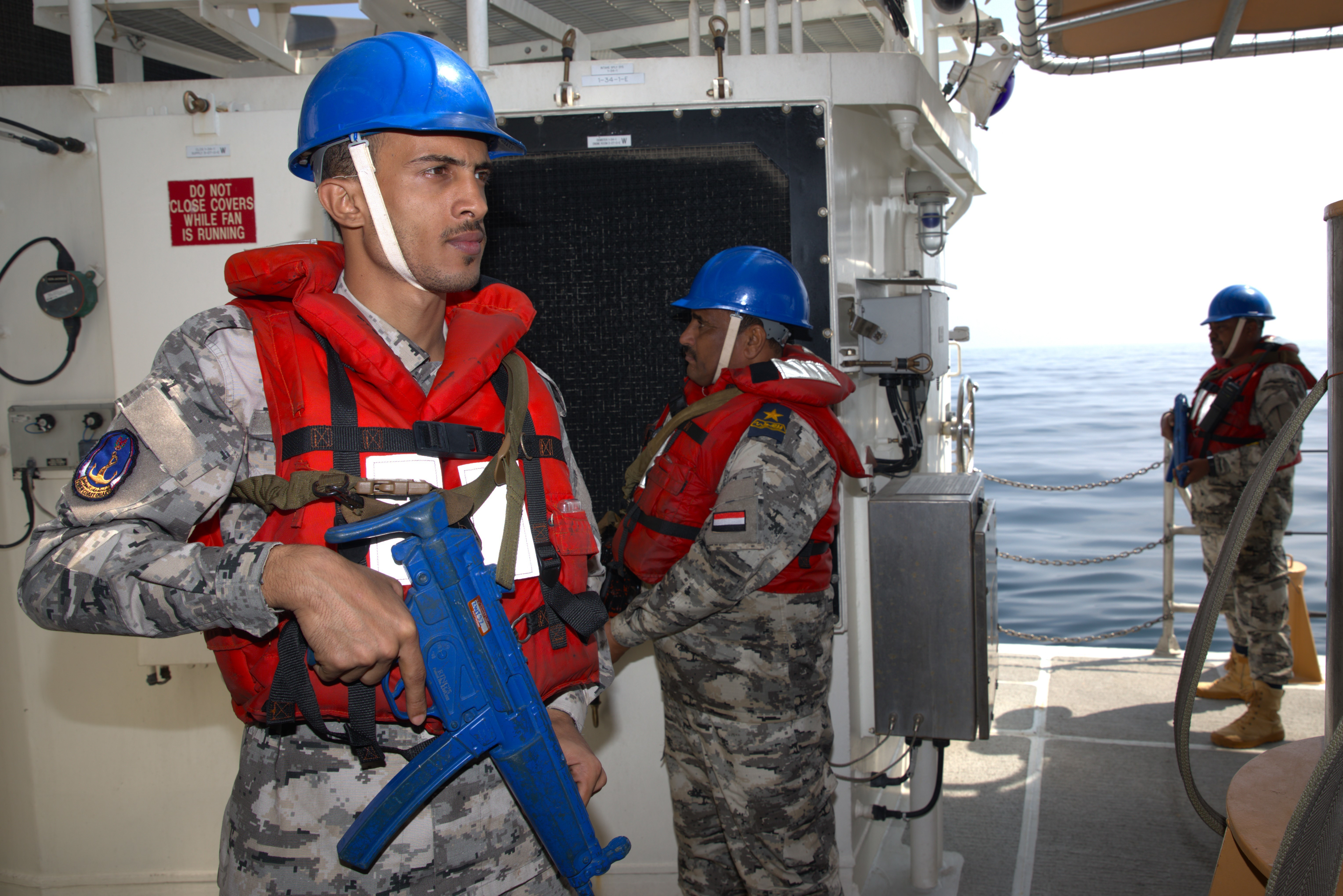
Members of the Yemen Coast Guard conduct a simulated vessel boarding aboard U.S. Coast Guard cutter USCGC Robert Goldman, March 2023

== See also ==
- Sana'a (patrol vessel)
