= 5-Amino-1-methylquinolinium =

Identifiers
- IUPAC name: 5-amino-1-methylquinolinium
- CAS Number: 685079-15-6
- PubChem CID: 950107
- ChemSpider: 76713110
- UNII: PMX593N4N3
- ChEMBL: ChEMBL4116828

Chemical and physical data
- Formula: C_{10}H_{11}N_{2}
- Molar mass: 159.212 g·mol^{−1}
- 3D model (JSmol): Interactive image
- SMILES: C[N+]1=CC=CC2=C(C=CC=C21)N
- InChI: InChI=1S/C10H10N2/c1-12-7-3-4-8-9(11)5-2-6-10(8)12/h2-7,11H,1H3/p+1; Key:ZMJBCEIHNOWCMC-UHFFFAOYSA-O

5-Amino-1-methylquinolinium (5MQ, 5-Amino-1MQ) is a chemical compound which acts as a selective inhibitor of the enzyme nicotinamide N-methyltransferase (NNMT). Since it has a permanent positive charge, it is always encountered in a salt form, usually as the chloride or iodide salt. It produces weight loss in mice and is of potential interest in cancer research. It has also been sold as a grey-market weight loss product, sometimes represented as a peptide, however it is not a peptide but rather an experimental small molecule with no formal toxicity studies or clinical trial results in humans.

== See also ==
- 2,4-Dinitrophenol
- Adipotide
- Retatrutide
- SANA (drug)
