= Sa 23 =

Czechoslovak submachine gun

CZ Model 23/25
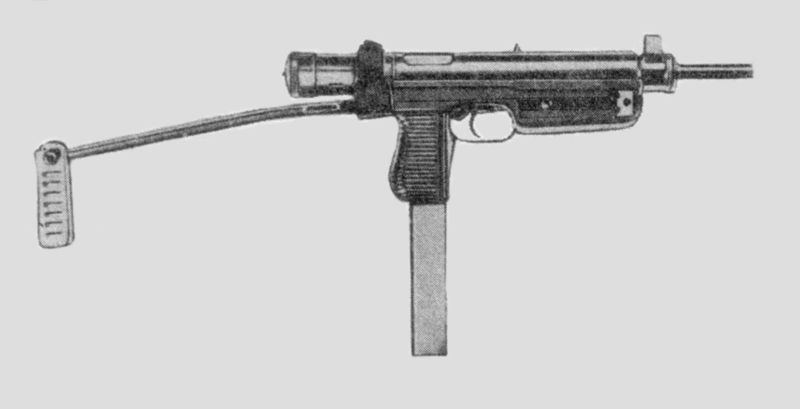
- Type: Submachine gun
- Place of origin: Czechoslovakia

Service history
- In service: 1948–present
- Used by: See Users
- Wars: 1967 Israeli-Arab war; Vietnam War; Cambodian Civil War; Portuguese Colonial War; Bay of Pigs Invasion; The Troubles; Basque conflict; Communist insurgency in Thailand; Nigerian Civil War; Rhodesian Bush War; South African Border War; Angolan Civil War; Mozambican Civil War; Chinese-Vietnamese War; Invasion of Grenada; Salvadoran Civil War; Lebanese Civil War; Syrian Civil War

Production history
- Manufacturer: Česká zbrojovka Uherský Brod
- Produced: 1948–1968
- No. built: Approx. 100,000

Specifications
- Mass: 3.27 kg empty (folding stock models Sa 25, Sa 26); 3.5 kg empty (fixed wood stock models Sa 23, Sa 24)
- Length: 445 mm folding stock model folded (Sa 25, Sa 26); 686 mm fixed stock and unfolded folding stock
- Barrel length: 284 mm
- Cartridge: 7.62×25mm Tokarev; 9×19mm Parabellum
- Action: Blowback, open bolt
- Rate of fire: 600 rpm
- Feed system: 24 or 40 round (9mm Sa 23, Sa 25); 32 round (7.62mm Sa 24, Sa 26)
- Sights: Iron sights

The CZ Model 23/25 (properly, Sa 23/25 or Sa vz. 48b/samopal vz. 48b – samopal vzor 48 výsadkový, "submachine gun model year 1948 para") was a series of Czechoslovak designed submachine guns introduced in 1948. There were four generally very similar submachine guns in this series: the Sa 23, Sa 24, Sa 25, and Sa 26. The primary designer was Jaroslav Holeček (15 September, 1923–12 October 1997), chief engineer of the Česká zbrojovka Uherský Brod arms factory.

== Design ==
The Sa 23 series utilize a straightforward blowback action, with no locked breech, and fire from the open bolt position. They also use a progressive trigger for selecting between semi-automatic fire and fully automatic fire. Lightly pulling on the trigger will fire a single shot. Pulling the trigger farther to the rear in a continuous motion will fire fully automatically, until the trigger is released or the magazine is empty.

The Sa 23 series were submachine guns with a telescoping bolt, in which the forward part of the moving bolt extends forwards past the back end of the barrel, wrapping around that barrel. This feature reduces the required length of the submachine gun significantly and allows for better balance and handling. Handling was further improved by using a single vertical handgrip housing the magazine and trigger mechanism, roughly centered along the gun's length. The gun's receiver was machined from a single circular steel tube.

The design of the Sa 23 series submachine guns is most notable in the West for having inspired the open-bolt, blowback-operated, telescoping bolt design of the slightly later Uzi submachine gun.

== Variations ==
- The Sa 23 (vz. 48a) was the first variant, using a fixed wood stock and firing standard 9×19mm Parabellum ammunition. Has a straight vertical pistol grip and ammunition magazine. Magazines were issued with 24 and 40 round capacity.
- The Sa 25 (vz. 48b) was the second and perhaps best known variant, using a folding metal stock, still firing 9×19mm Parabellum ammunition. Other than the folding stock, is identical to the Sa 23 and uses the same 24 and 40 round magazines.

The Sa 24 and Sa 26 were introduced after Czechoslovakia joined the Warsaw Pact, and were redesigned to fire 7.62×25mm Tokarev standard Soviet type pistol ammunition.

- The Sa 24 (vz. 48a/52) corresponds to the Sa.23, using a fixed wood stock and firing 7.62×25mm Tokarev ammunition. Can be visually distinguished from Sa.23 as it has a slightly forwards-slanted pistol grip and ammunition magazine, though the main receiver and other components are otherwise visibly identical. It was issued with 32-round magazines.
- The Sa 26 (vz. 48b/52) corresponds to the Sa.25, with a folding metal stock but otherwise identical to the Sa.24, using the same 32-round magazines.

== Usage ==
The Sa 23 and 25 models were used by Cuba during the 1960s and 1970s, and some can be seen in photos of the Bay of Pigs invasion.

After the Sa 25 was declared obsolete in 1968, many of the 9mm weapons were sold around the world. The surplus weapons were exported to other communist countries including North Vietnam. A somewhat-modified copy of the 9×19mm Parabellum model was produced in Rhodesia in the early 1970s as the LDP and given the nickname "Rhogun". Manufacture was later transferred to South Africa where it was briefly marketed as the Sanna 77 in semi-automatic fire only. Some were also used by the Irish Republican Army during The Troubles in the 1980s and early 1990s, likely supplied by Lebanon.

After the Velvet Revolution, many of these guns were still in the inventories of the Czech armed forces, and were sold off as surplus, many ending up on the black market. Others were deactivated for sale to civilian collectors, or demilitarized and sent to the United States where many have been re-built as semi-automatic only carbines.

== Users ==
- Angola: Sa 24
- Biafra: Purchased CZ-23s and CZ-25s in 1967.
- Cambodia
- Cape Verde: Unknown users.
- Chad: Sa 23 and Sa 25.
- Chile
- Cuba
- Czechoslovakia
- Egypt: Sa 25
- Grenada: Used by the People's Revolutionary Army.
- Guatemala
- Guinea
- Guinea-Bissau
- Indonesia: Sa 24 and Sa 26
- Israel: Sa 25
- Lebanon − Also used by the Palestine Liberation Organization and other sectarian militias during the Lebanese Civil War.
- Libya
- (Lithuania) Lithuanian partisans after World War II.
- Mozambique
- Nicaragua
- Nigeria
- Poland: Used by Biuro Ochrony Rzadu in mid 90s.
- Rhodesia
- Romania
- Somalia
- South Africa
- Syria
- Tanzania
- Vietnam − Sa 24

== See also ==
- Daniela Klette (born 1958), suspected former German Red Army Faction (RAF) terrorist, arrested 2024
- List of submachine guns
- List of weapons of the Lebanese Civil War
- Weapons of the Salvadoran Civil War
