= Yemeni patrol boat Sana'a =

Sana'a
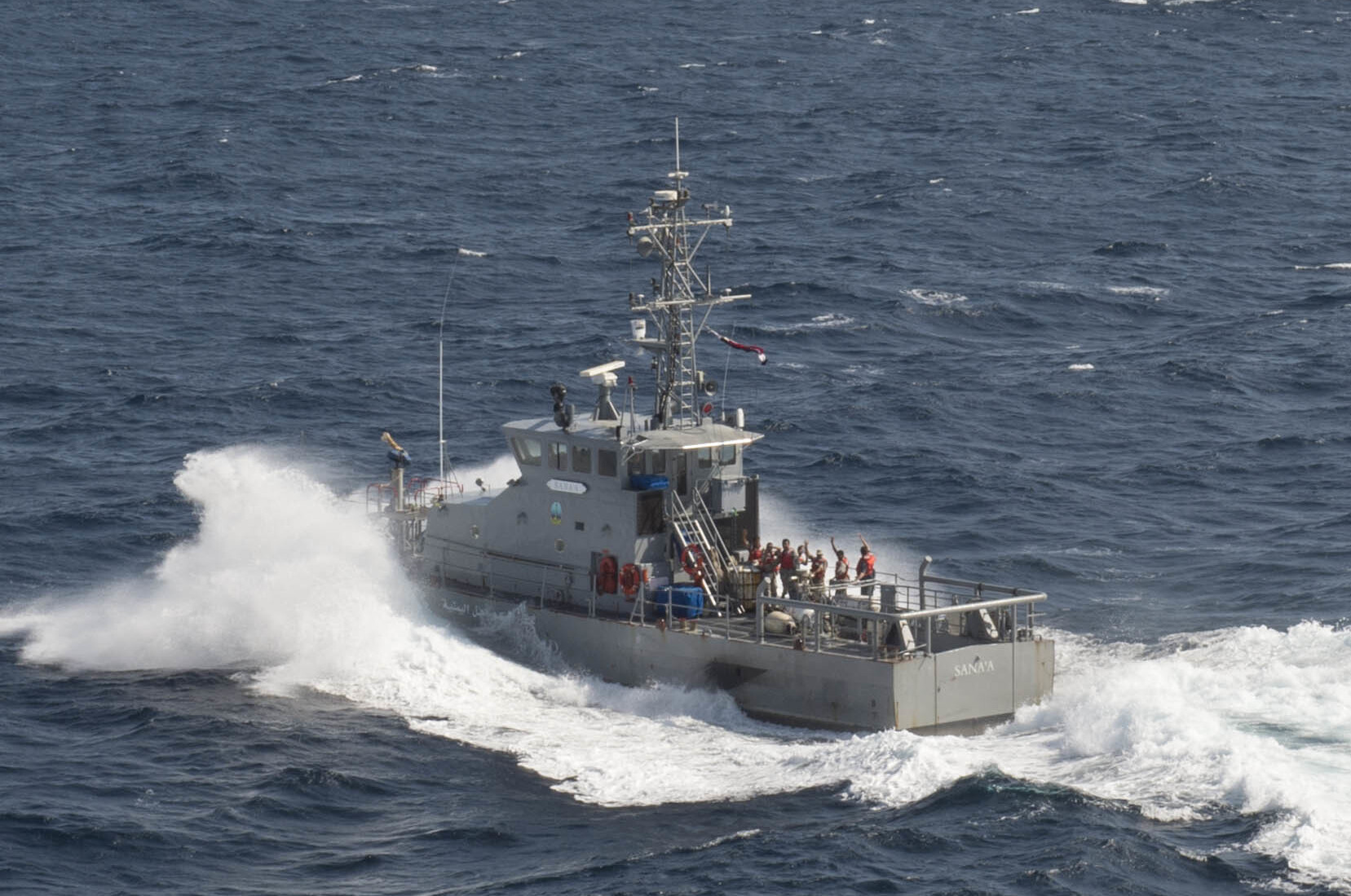
- Sana'a transiting the Red Sea in 2014

History

Yemen
- Name: Sana'a
- Owner: Yemeni Coast Guard
- Builder: Bollinger Shipyards
- Fate: Sank 9 March 2017

General characteristics
- Class & type: Marine Protector-class patrol boat
- Length: 6.5 m (21 ft 4 in)
- Speed: 25–35 knots (46–65 km/h; 29–40 mph)

Sana'a was a patrol boat built at Bollinger Shipyards for the Coast Guard of Yemen. She has one sister ship, Aden. The vessels use the same design as the United States Coast Guard's Marine Protector-class patrol boats. US vessels are, in turn, based on the Damen Stan 2600, designed by Damen Group.

Sana'a sank on 9 March 2017 after possibly striking a naval mine.
