= Uzi =

Family of Israeli submachine guns

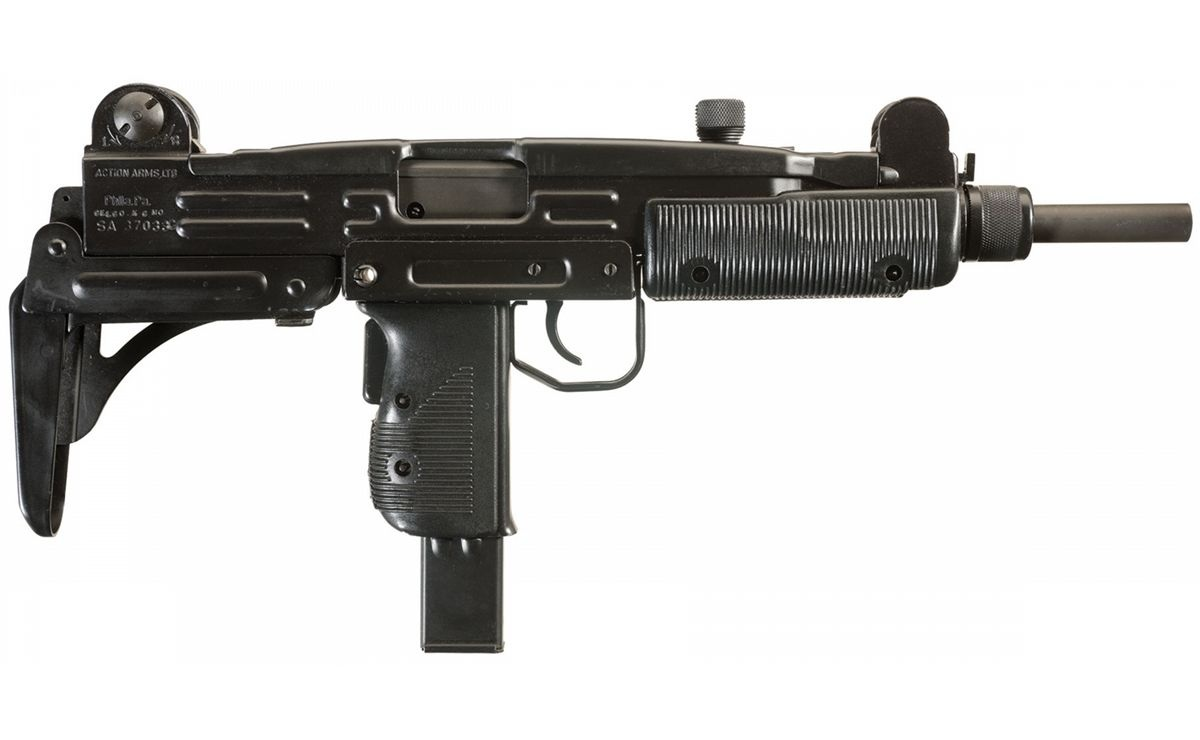
- Uzi submachine gun
- Type: Submachine gun
- Place of origin: Israel

Service history
- In service: 1954–present
- Used by: See Users
- Wars: 1950s; Suez Crisis; Basque conflict; 1960s; Guatemalan Civil War; Portuguese Colonial War; The troubles; West New Guinea dispute; Communist insurgency in Thailand; Six-Day War; Vietnam War; Ñancahuazú Guerrilla; War of Attrition; 1970s; Yom Kippur War; Internal conflict in Colombia; Internal conflict in Peru; Angolan Civil War; Shaba II; Rhodesian Bush War; Nicaraguan Revolution; 1980s; Salvadoran Civil War; Attempted assassination of Ronald Reagan; Falklands War; Sri Lankan Civil War; Invasion of Grenada; Lebanese Civil War; 1982 Lebanon war; South African Border War; Thai–Laotian Border War; 1990s; Persian Gulf War; Yugoslav Wars; Somali Civil War; Sierra Leone Civil War; Burundian Civil War; First Congo War; 2000s; War in Darfur; Mexican drug war; Kivu conflict; First Ivorian Civil War; 2010s; Syrian Civil War; 2020s; Russo-Ukrainian war (2022–present); Myanmar Civil War; Gaza war

Production history
- Designer: Uziel Gal
- Designed: 1950
- Manufacturer: Israel Military Industries; Israel Weapon Industries Copies or variants made by: FN Herstal; Norinco; Z111 Factory; Lyttleton Engineering Works (under Vektor Arms); RH-ALAN; Group Industries
- Produced: 1950–present
- No. built: 2,000,000+
- Variants: See Variants

Specifications
- Mass: 3.5 kg (7.72 lb)
- Length: 445 mm (17.5 in) stockless; 470 mm (18.5 in) folding stock collapsed; 640 mm (25 in) folding stock extended
- Barrel length: 260 mm (10.2 in)
- Cartridge: .22 LR.41 AE.45 ACP; 9×19mm Parabellum; 9×21mm IMI
- Action: Blowback, open bolt
- Rate of fire: 600 rounds/min 950 rounds/min Mini Uzi; 1200–1500 rounds/min Micro Uzi
- Muzzle velocity: 400 m/s (1,300 ft/s) (9mm)
- Effective firing range: 200 m
- Feed system: 10-round box magazine (.22 and .41 AE); 12-, 16-, or 22-round box (.45 ACP); 20-, 25-, 32-, 40-, or 50-round box (9×19mm Parabellum)
- Sights: Iron sights

The Uzi ( /ˈuːzi/; Hebrew: עוּזִי, romanized: ʿûzî; officially cased as UZI) is a family of Israeli open-bolt, blowback-operated submachine guns and machine pistols first designed by Major Uziel "Uzi" Gal in the late 1940s, shortly after the establishment of the State of Israel. It is one of the first weapons to incorporate a telescoping bolt design, which allows the magazine to be housed in the pistol grip for a shorter weapon.

The Uzi prototype was finished in 1950. It was first introduced to Israel Defense Forces (IDF) special forces in 1954, and the weapon was placed into general issue two years later. The IDF supplied Uzis to rear-echelon troops, officers, artillery troops and tank crews, as well as a frontline weapon by elite light infantry assault forces.

The Uzi has been exported to over 90 countries. Over its service lifetime, it has been manufactured by Israel Military Industries, FN Herstal, and other manufacturers. From the 1960s through to the 1980s, more Uzi submachine guns were sold to more military, law enforcement and security markets than any other submachine gun ever made.

== Design ==
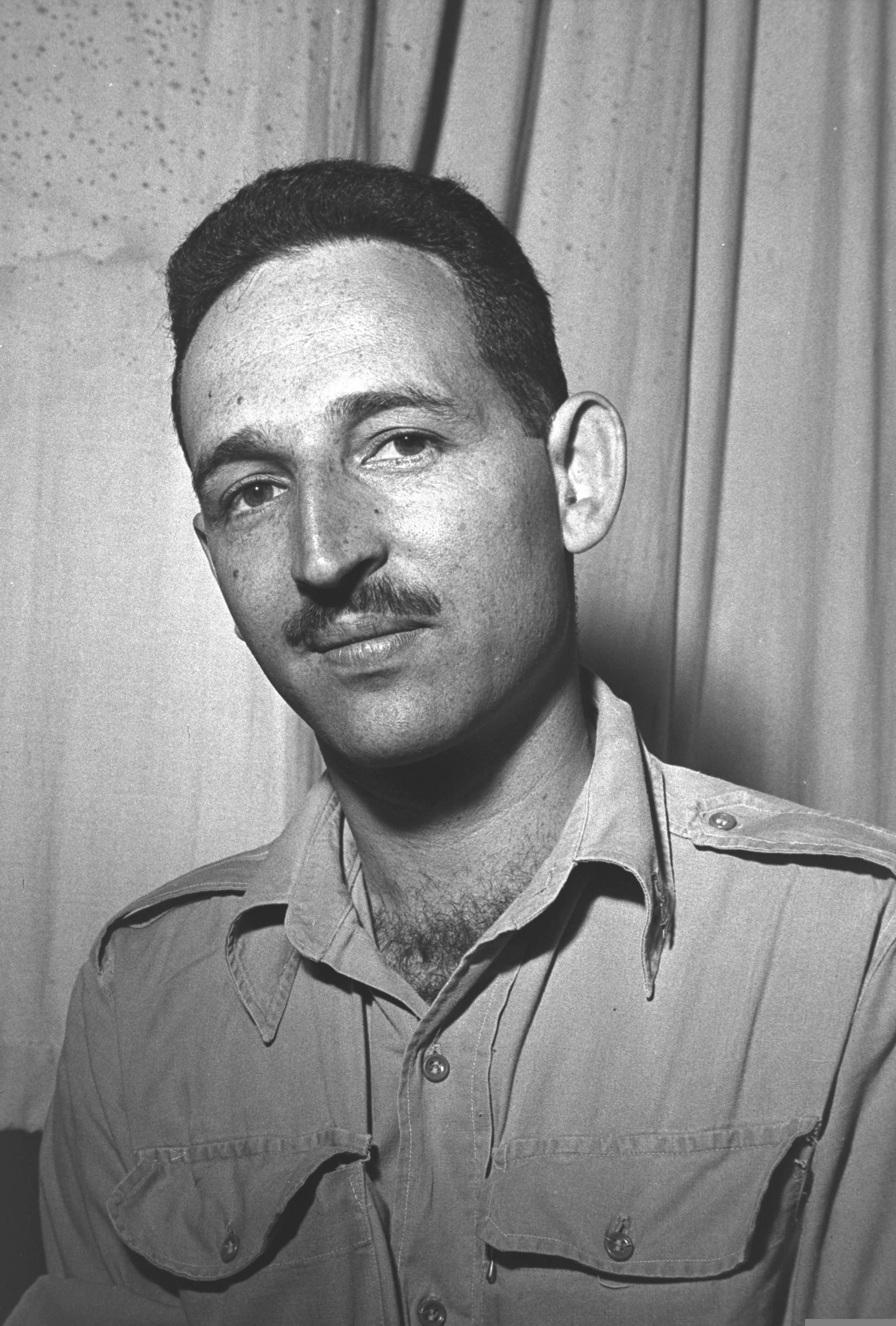
Uziel Gal, the designer and inventor of the Uzi submachine gun

The Uzi uses an open-bolt, blowback-operated design, quite similar to the Jaroslav Holeček-designed Czech ZK 476 (prototype only) and the production Sa 23, Sa 24, Sa 25, and Sa 26 series of submachine guns introduced in 1948. The open bolt design exposes the barrel's breech end, improving cooling after periods of continuous fire. However, it means that since the bolt is held to the rear when cocked, the receiver is more susceptible to contamination from sand and dirt. It uses a telescoping bolt design, in which the bolt wraps around the breech end of the barrel. This allows the barrel to be moved far back into the receiver and the magazine to be housed in the pistol grip, allowing for a heavier, slower-firing bolt in a shorter, better-balanced weapon.

The weapon is constructed primarily from stamped sheet metal, making it less expensive per unit to manufacture than an equivalent design machined from forgings. With relatively few moving parts, the Uzi is easy to strip for maintenance or repair. The magazine is housed within the pistol grip, allowing for intuitive and easy reloading in dark or difficult conditions, under the principle of "hand finds hand". The pistol grip is fitted with a grip safety, making it difficult to fire accidentally. However, the protruding vertical magazine makes the gun awkward to fire when prone. The Uzi features a bayonet lug.

=== Operation ===
The non-reciprocating charging handle on the top of the receiver cover is used to retract the bolt. Variants have a ratchet safety mechanism which will catch the bolt and lock its movement if it is retracted past the magazine, but not far enough to engage the sear. When the handle is fully retracted to the rear, the bolt will cock (catch) on the sear mechanism and the handle and cover are released to spring fully forward under power of a small spring. The cover will remain forward during firing since it does not reciprocate with the bolt. The military and police versions will fire immediately upon chambering a cartridge as the Uzi is an open bolt weapon.

There are two external safety mechanisms on the Uzi. The first is the three-position selector lever located at the top of the grip and behind the trigger group. The rear position is "S", or "safe" (S = Sicher or Secure on the MP2), which locks the sear and prevents movement of the bolt.

The second external safety mechanism is the grip safety, which is located at the rear of the grip. It is meant to help prevent accidental discharge if the weapon is dropped or the user loses a firm grip on the weapon during firing.

The trigger mechanism is a conventional firearm trigger, but functions only to control the release mechanism for either the bolt (submachine gun) or firing pin holding mechanism (semi-auto) since the Uzi does not incorporate an internal cocking or hammer mechanism. While the open-bolt system is mechanically simpler than a closed-bolt design (e.g. Heckler & Koch MP5), it creates a noticeable delay between when the trigger is pulled and when the gun fires.

The magazine release button or lever is located on the lower portion of the pistol grip and is intended to be manipulated by the non-firing hand. The paddle-like button lies flush with the pistol grip in order to help prevent accidental release of the magazine during rigorous or careless handling.

When the gun is de-cocked the ejector port closes, preventing entry of dust and dirt. Though the Uzi's stamped-metal receiver is equipped with pressed reinforcement slots to accept accumulated dirt and sand, the weapon can still jam with heavy accumulations of sand in desert combat conditions when not cleaned regularly. The magazine must be removed prior to de-cocking the weapon.

=== Stocks ===
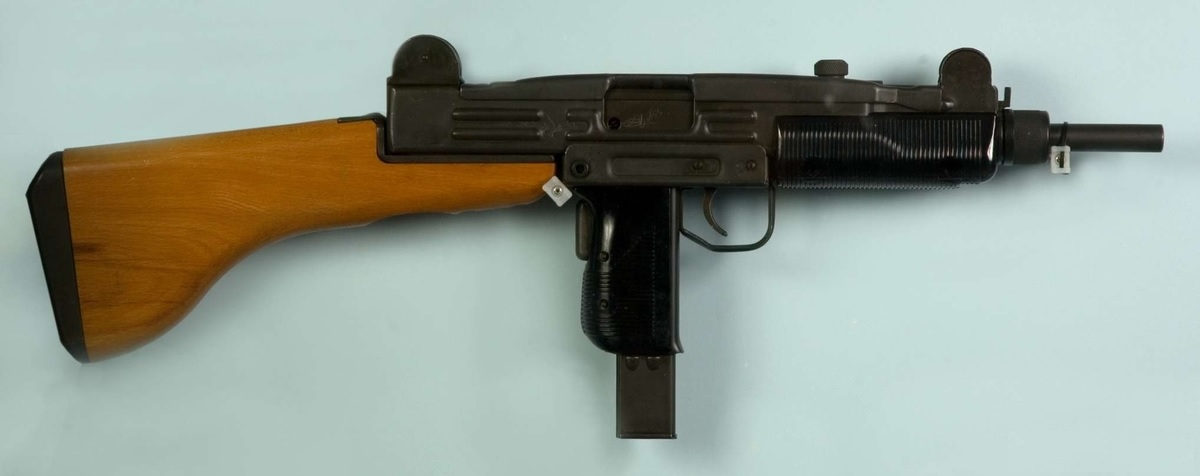
Uzi with a detachable wooden stock

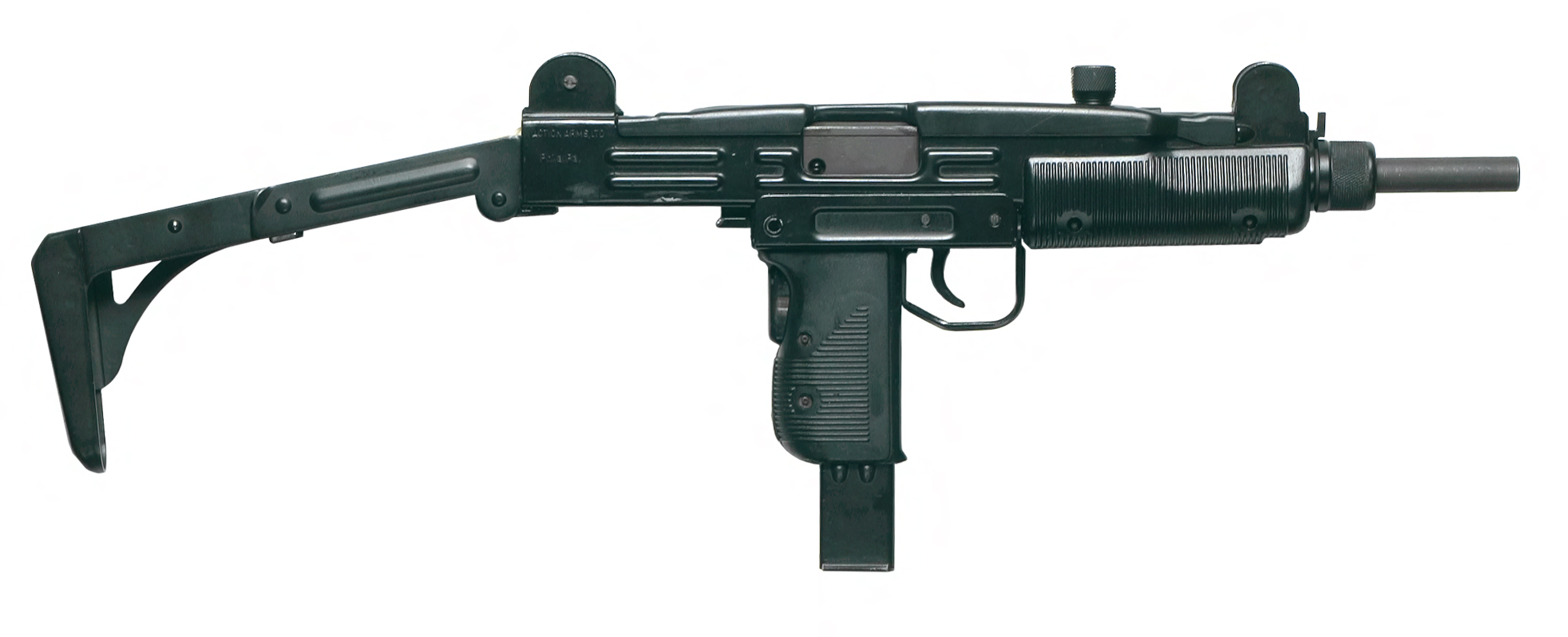
Uzi with a folding stock

There are different stocks available for the Uzi proper. There is a wooden stock with a metal buttplate that comes in three similar variations that were used by the IDF. The first version had a flat butt and straight comb and had hollows for a cleaning rod and gun oil bottle. The second had an angled butt and a straight comb and no hollows. The third had an angled butt and curved comb and no hollows; a polymer version is currently available from IMI. The wooden stocks originally had a quick-release base but the ones sold in the United States often had a permanent base for legal reasons, as detachable stocks on pistols or other short-barreled weapons upgrade the weapon to NFA status.

Choate made an aftermarket polymer stock with a rubber butt-pad that had a flat butt, a straight comb, and a permanent base.

In 1956, IMI developed a downward-folding twin-strut metal stock with two swivelling sections that tuck under the rear of the receiver. The Mini Uzi has a forward-folding single-strut metal stock that is actually an inch longer than the Uzi's. Its buttplate can be used as a foregrip when stowed. The Micro Uzi has a similar model.

=== Magazines ===
The original box magazines for the 9mm Uzi had a 25-round capacity. Experimental 40- and 50-round extended magazines were tried but were found to be unreliable. A 32-round extended magazine was then tried and was later accepted as standard. The Mini Uzi and Micro Uzi use a shorter 20-round magazine. Available extended magazines include 40-, and 50-round magazines. Other high-capacity aftermarket magazines exist such as the Vector Arms 70-round and Beta Company (Beta C-Mag) 100-round drums.

The .45 ACP Uzi used a 16- or 22-round magazine, while the .45 ACP Micro Uzi and Mini Uzi used a 12-round magazine. A conversion kit by Vector Arms allowed the .45-caliber Uzi to use the same 30-round magazines as the M3 "Grease Gun".

=== Caliber conversions ===
The Uzi was available with caliber conversion kits in .22 LR or .41 AE. The operator just has to change the barrel, bolt and magazine. The .22 LR had 20-round magazines; the original IMI kit used a barrel insert while the aftermarket Action Arms kit used a full replacement barrel. The .41 AE also had a 20-round magazine; since it has the same bolt face as the 9×19mm Parabellum, only the barrel and magazine needed to be changed.

IMI also manufactured a .45ACP conversion kit both in full auto/open bolt with a 10.2" barrel for the 9mm SMG and a semi only/closed bolt with a 16" barrel for the carbine version. Magazine capacity is limited, with 2 sizes of 16 and 10 rds each.

== History and operational use ==
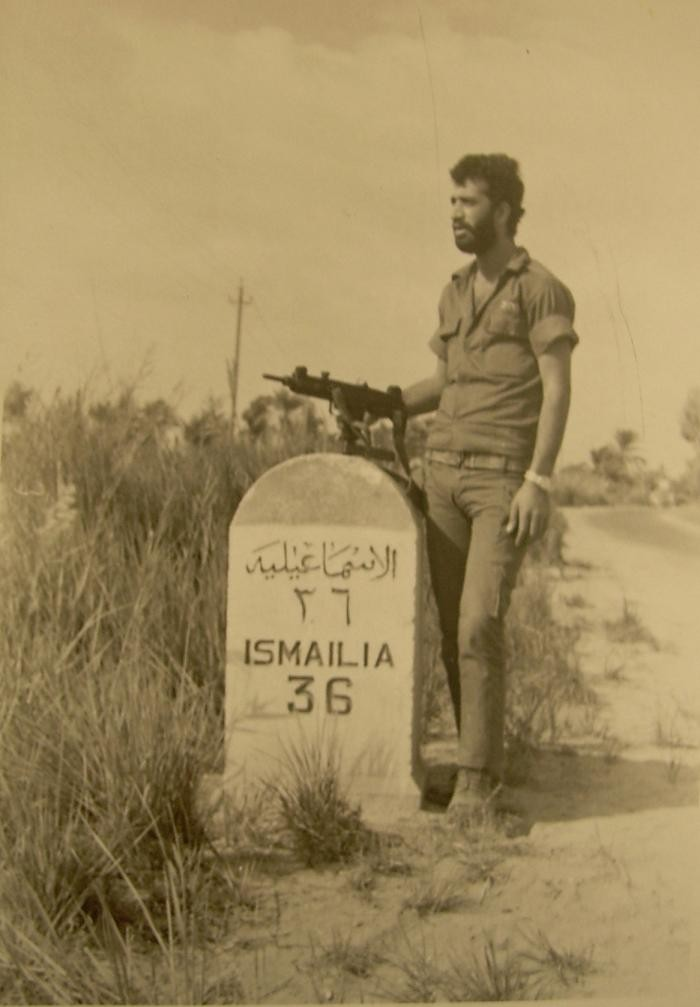
An Israeli soldier with an Uzi during the Yom Kippur War (1973)

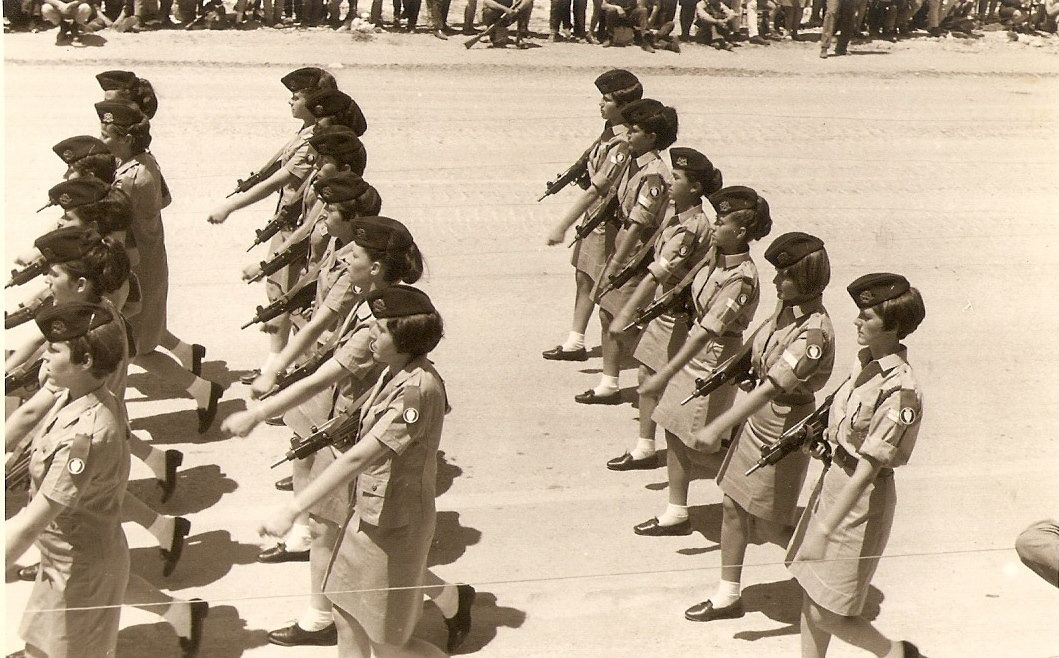
Israeli soldiers on parade with Uzis, Jerusalem, 1968

The Uzi submachine gun was designed by Captain (later Major) Uziel Gal of the Israel Defense Forces (IDF) following the 1948 Arab–Israeli War. The weapon was submitted to the Israeli Army for evaluation and won out over more conventional designs due to its simplicity and economy of manufacture. Gal did not want the weapon to be named after him, but his request was ignored. The Uzi was officially adopted in 1951. First introduced to IDF special forces in 1954, the weapon was placed into general issue two years later. The first Uzis were equipped with a short, fixed wooden buttstock, and this is the version that initially saw combat during the 1956 Suez Campaign. Later models would be equipped with a folding metal stock.

The Uzi was used as a personal defense weapon by rear-echelon troops, officers, artillery troops and tankers, as well as a frontline weapon by elite light infantry assault forces. The Uzi's compact size and firepower proved instrumental in clearing Syrian bunkers and Jordanian defensive positions during the 1967 Six-Day War. Though the weapon was phased out of frontline IDF service in the 1980s, some Uzis and Uzi variants were still used by a few IDF units until December 2003, when the IDF announced that it was retiring the Uzi from all IDF forces. It was subsequently replaced by the fully automatic Micro Tavor.

In general, the Uzi was a reliable weapon in military service. However, even the Uzi fell victim to extreme conditions of sand and dust. During the Sinai Campaign of the Yom Kippur War, IDF Army units reaching the Suez Canal reported that of all their small arms, only the 7.62mm FN MAG machine gun was still in operation.

The Uzi proved especially useful for mechanized infantry needing a compact weapon and for infantry units clearing bunkers and other confined spaces. However, its limited range and accuracy in automatic fire (approximately 50 m (160 ft)) could be disconcerting when encountering enemy forces armed with longer-range small arms, and heavier support weapons could not always substitute for a longer-ranged individual weapon. These failings eventually caused the phasing out of the Uzi from IDF front-line assault units.

The Uzi has been used in various conflicts outside Israel and the Middle East during the 1960s and 1970s. Quantities of 9 mm Uzi submachine guns were used by Portuguese cavalry, police, and security forces during the Portuguese Colonial Wars in Africa.

== Worldwide sales ==
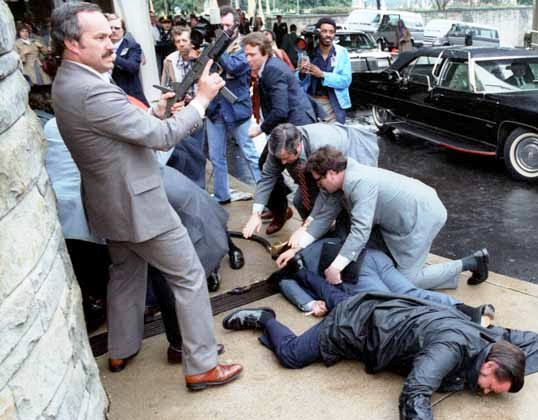
Secret Service agents cover Press Secretary James Brady and police officer Thomas Delahanty during the assassination attempt of President Ronald Reagan by John Hinckley Jr. on March 30, 1981. Secret Service agent Robert Wanko unfolds the stock of an Uzi in case of further attack.

Total sales of the weapon to date (end of 2001) has netted IMI over 2 billion US dollars, with over 90 countries using the weapons either for their armed forces or in law enforcement.

- The Royal Netherlands Army first issued the Uzi in 1956. It was the first country other than Israel to use it as a service weapon. Their models are distinct in that they have a wooden stock (made to their specifications) that is more angular, an angled butt and a curved comb, and is 2 inches longer than the IDF model. The wooden stock versions were mainly used by the Royal Netherlands Navy and the Marine Corps. The Army and Airforce received the metal foldable stock versions as replacement. No bayonets were issued.
- The German Bundeswehr (especially its tank crews) used the Uzi since 1959 under the designation MP2. It replaced the MP1 (Beretta M1938/49) and Thompson M1 in service. The MP2 was fitted with the IDF-style wooden stock and the later MP2A1 was fitted with the metal folding stock. It can be recognized by its distinctive three-position "DES" selector switch: "D" for "Dauerfeuer" ("continuous-fire", or "automatic"), "E" for "Einzelfeuer" ("single-fire", or "semi-automatic"), and "S" for "Sicher" ("secure", or "safe"). It was replaced with the Heckler & Koch MP7 Personal Defense Weapon in 2007. Most of the Uzis used in Germany consisted of receivers with Israeli markings and grips made by FN.
- The Belgian Armed Forces have used Uzi machine pistols in 9mm, .45 ACP and 22LR calibres, license-made by FN Herstal from 1958 to 1971. They were also issued to the paramilitary Gendarmerie.
- The Irish Gardaí ERU and RSU were issued the Uzi from the 1970s to 2012. It was replaced with the Heckler & Koch MP7 in March 2014.
- In Rhodesia, the Uzi was produced under license from 1976 until the fall of Rhodesia in 1980. It was made from Israeli-supplied (and later Rhodesian-made) components.
- Sri Lanka ordered a few thousand Mini Uzi and Uzi carbines in 1990s. Currently those are deployed with the Sri Lanka Army, Sri Lanka Navy Elite Forces, and the Sri Lanka Police Special Task Force as their primary weapon when providing security for VIPs.
- The United States Secret Service used the Uzi as their standard submachine gun from the 1960s until the early 1990s, when it was phased out and replaced with the Heckler & Koch MP5 and FN P90. When President Ronald Reagan was shot on March 30, 1981, Secret Service Special Agent Robert Wanko pulled an Uzi out of a briefcase and covered the rear of the presidential limousine as it sped to safety with the wounded president inside.
- All merchant mariners of the Zim Integrated Shipping line are trained in the use of, and issued, the Uzi.

== Military variants ==
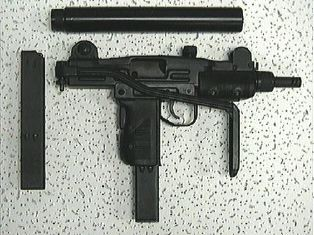
A Mini Uzi

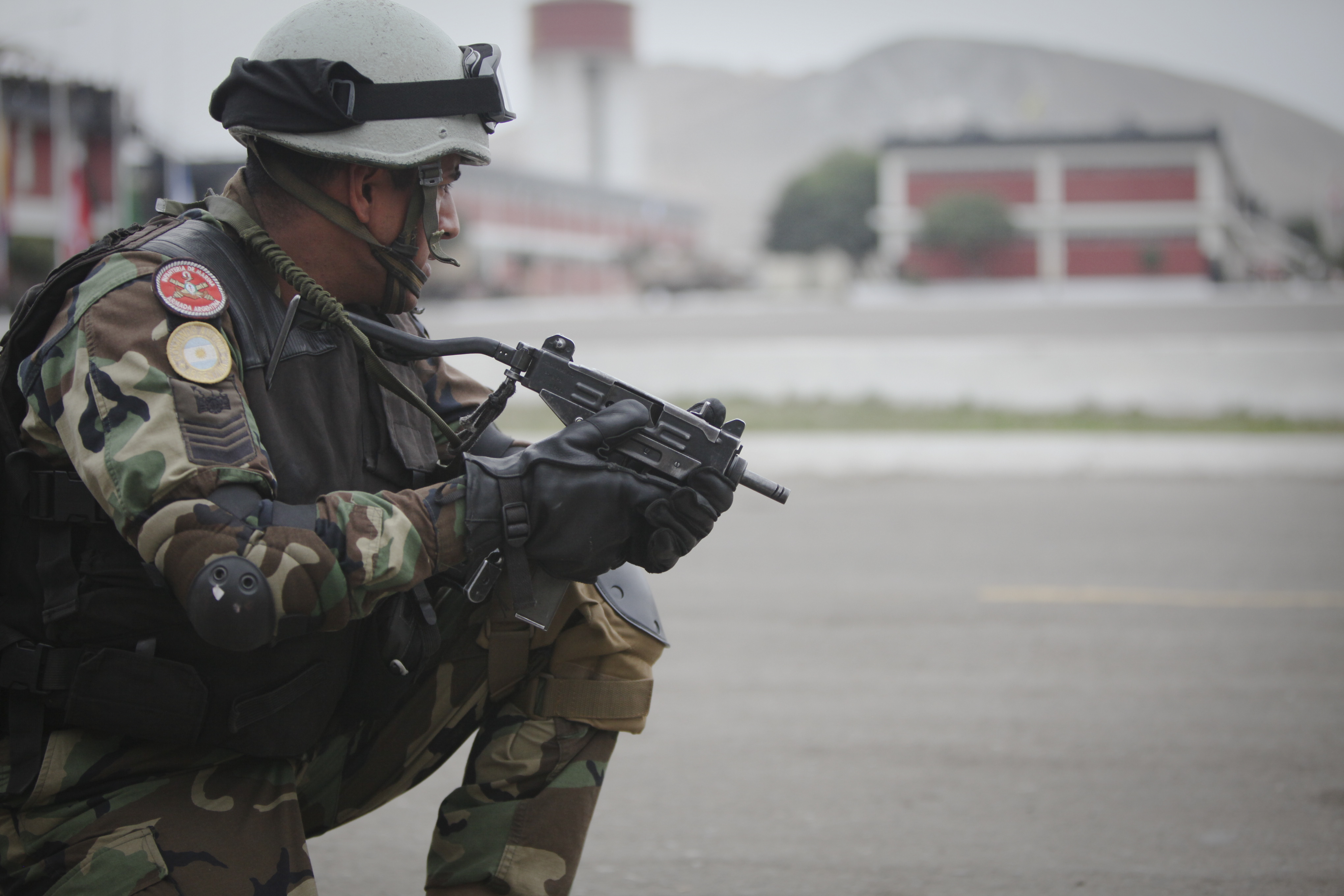
Argentine special forces with a Micro Uzi

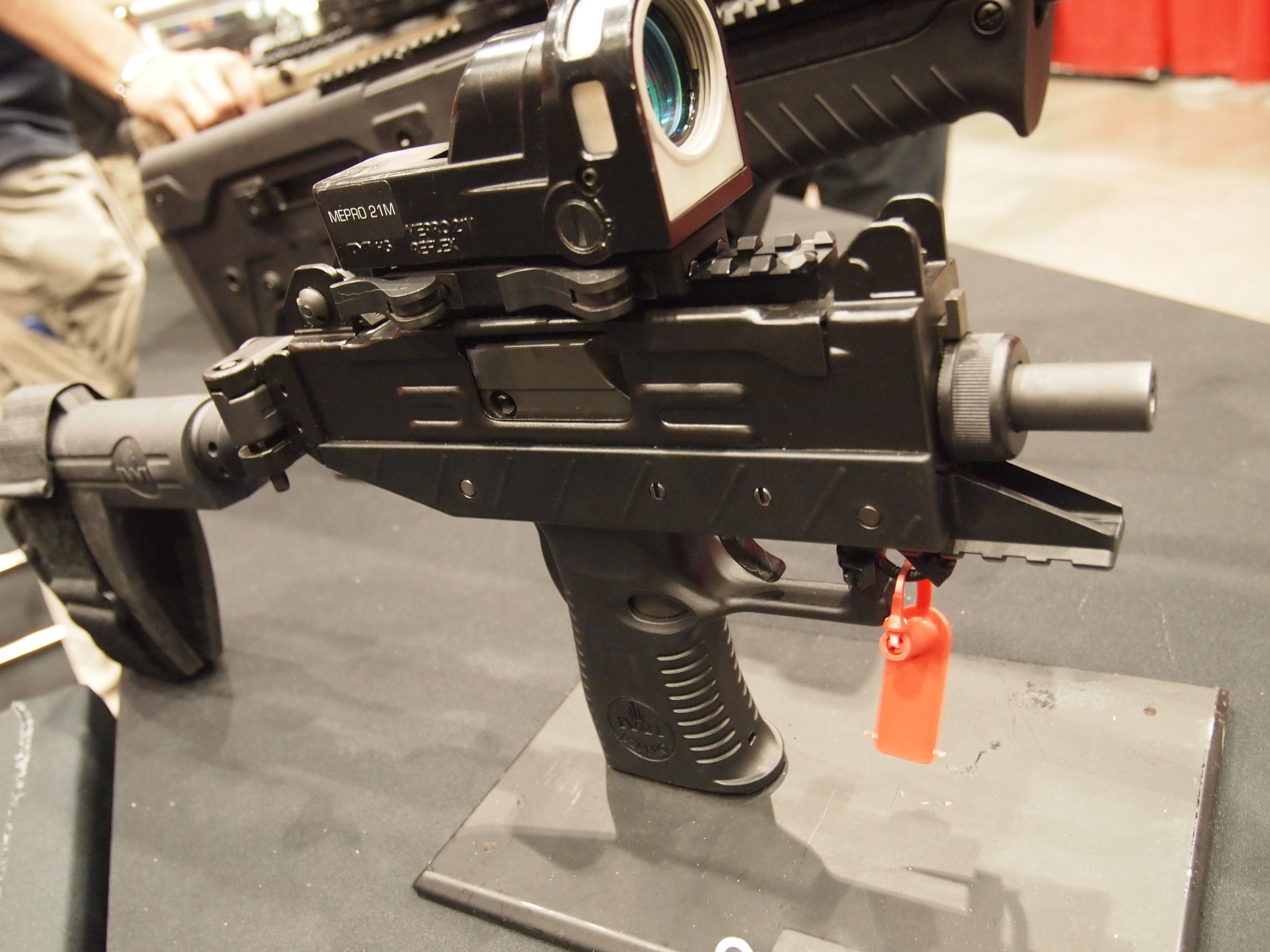
Uzi Pro

The standard Uzi has a 10-inch (250 mm) barrel. It has a rate of automatic fire of 600 rounds per minute (rpm) when chambered in 9mm Parabellum; the .45 ACP model's rate of fire is slower at 500 rpm.

The Mini Uzi is a smaller version of the regular Uzi, first introduced in 1980. The Mini Uzi is 600 mm (24 in) long or 360 mm (14 in) long with the stock folded. Its barrel length is 197 mm (7.8 in), its muzzle velocity is 375 m/s (1,230 ft/s) and its effective range is 100 m (330 ft). It has a greater automatic rate of fire of 950 rounds per minute due to the shorter bolt. Its weight is approximately 2.7 kg (6.0 lb).

The Micro Uzi is an even further scaled down version of the Uzi, introduced in 1986. The Micro Uzi is 486 mm (19.1 in) long, reduced to 282 mm (11.1 in) with the stock folded, and its barrel length is 117 mm (4.6 in). It has a closed bolt compared to its original counterpart. Its muzzle velocity is 350 m/s (1,100 ft/s) and its cyclic rate of fire is 1,200 rpm. It weighs slightly over 1.5 kg (3.3 lb).

The Uzi Pro, an improved variant of the Micro Uzi, was launched in 2010 by Israel Weapon Industries Ltd. (I.W.I.), formerly the magen ("small arms") division of Israel Military Industries. The Uzi Pro is a blowback-operated, select-fire, closed-bolt submachine gun with a large lower portion, comprising grip and handguard, entirely made of polymer to reduce weight; the grip section was redesigned to allow two-handed operation and facilitate control in full-automatic fire of such a small-sized firearm. The Uzi Pro features four Picatinny rails, two at the sides of the barrel, which can be removed, one below the barrel for the addition of foregrips and one on the top for optics. The under barrel rail is often shown with a specialised foregrip which attaches to the pistol grip to form a handguard. In addition, the cocking handle has been moved to the left side. The new weapon weighs 2.32 kg (5.1 lb) and has a length of 529 mm (20.8 in) with an extended stock, and 300 mm (12 in) while collapsed. As of 2011 it has been purchased by the IDF in limited numbers for evaluation and it is yet to be decided whether or not to order additional units for all of its special forces.

== Civilian variants ==
=== Uzi carbine ===
The Uzi carbine is similar in appearance to the Uzi submachine gun. The Uzi carbine is fitted with a 400-millimetre (16 in) barrel, to meet the minimum rifle barrel length requirement for civilian sales in the United States. A small number of Uzi carbines were produced with the standard length barrel for special markets. It fires from a closed-bolt position in semi-automatic mode only and uses a floating firing pin as opposed to a fixed firing pin. The FS-style selector switch has two positions (the automatic setting was blocked): "F" for "fire" (semi-auto) and "S" for "safe". Uzi carbines are available in .22 LR, 9mm, .41 AE, and .45 ACP calibers.

The Uzi carbine has two main variants, the Model A (imported from 1980 to 1983) and the Model B (imported from 1983 until 1989). The Type A was the same as the fully automatic Uzi, while the Type B had a firing pin safety and improved sights and sling swivels. These two variants were imported and distributed by Action Arms.

The American firm Group Industries made limited numbers of a copy of the Uzi "B" model semiauto carbine for sale in the US along with copies of the Uzi submachine gun for the U.S. collectors' market. After registering several hundred submachine guns transferable to the general public through a special government-regulated process, production was halted due to financial troubles at the company. Company assets (including partially made Uzi submachine guns, parts, and tooling) were purchased by an investment group later to become known as Vektor Arms. Vektor Arms built and marketed numerous versions of the Uzi carbine and the Mini Uzi. As of 2024, average prices can be over $25,000.00 USD.

Today, while the civilian manufacture, sale and possession of post-1986 select-fire Uzi and its variants is prohibited in the United States, it is still legal to sell templates, tooling and manuals to complete such conversion. These items are typically marketed as being "post-sample" materials for use by federal firearm licensees for manufacturing/distributing select-fire variants of the Uzi to law enforcement, military and overseas customers.

=== Mini Uzi carbine ===
The Mini Uzi carbine is similar in appearance to the Mini Uzi machine pistol. The Mini Uzi carbine is fitted with a 500-millimetre (20 in) barrel, to meet the minimum rifle overall length requirement for civilian sales in the United States. It fires from a closed-bolt position in semi-automatic mode only.

=== Uzi pistol ===
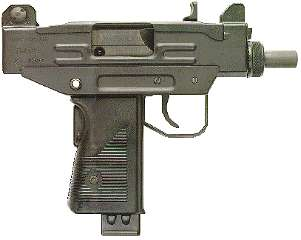
An Uzi pistol with a 20-round magazine

The Uzi pistol is a semi-automatic, closed bolt, and blowback-operated pistol variant. Its muzzle velocity is 345 m/s. It is a Micro Uzi with no shoulder stock or full-automatic firing capability. The intended users of the pistol are various security agencies in need of a high-capacity semi-automatic pistol, or civilian shooters who want a gun with those qualities and the familiarity of the Uzi style. It was introduced in 1984 and produced until 1993.

=== Uzi Pro pistol ===
The Uzi Pro pistol is a current version of the Uzi pistol. It has rails on the top and bottom, and there is an optional stabilizing brace. Unlike any other Uzi variant, the Uzi Pro pistol has a side charging handle, rather than a top charging handle, and has a three-stage safety. There are three safeties on the Uzi Pro pistol: a thumb safety, a grip safety, and a firing pin block. This model was intended for law enforcement and civilian use, due to the compact size, rails, and a semi-automatic rate of fire. Unlike other Uzi variants, the Uzi Pro pistol is only chambered for 9×19 Parabellum.

== Copies ==
=== Ero and Mini-Ero ===
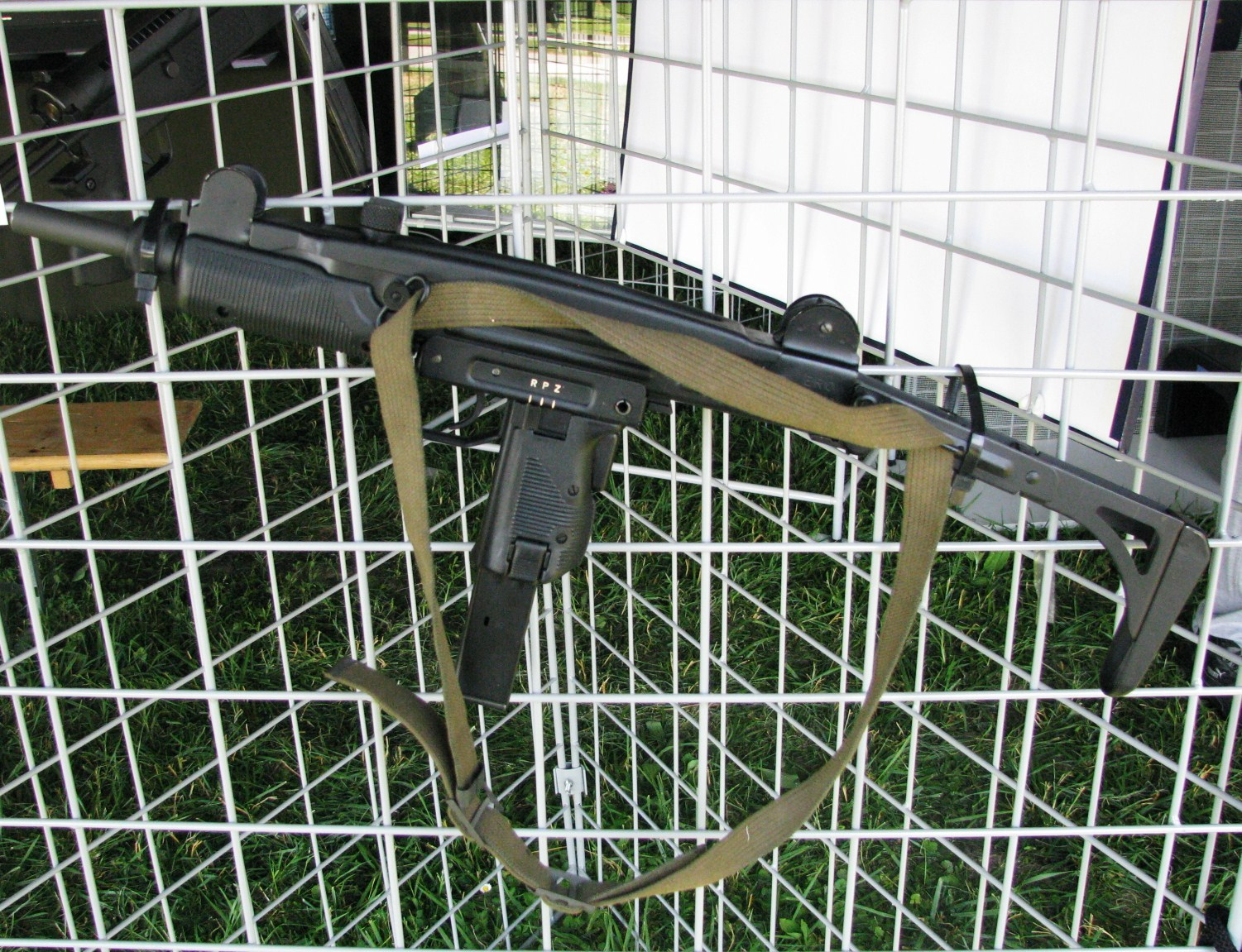
Strojnica ERO

The Ero submachine gun was produced by Končar Arma Grupa d.o.o. in Zagreb, Croatia from 1992 until 1996. Between 15,000 and 20,000 were produced. It was adopted by Armed Forces of Croatia in 1993 during the Croatian War of Independence. The Ero submachine gun is not a literal copy of the Israeli Uzi submachine gun. It is made of higher quality materials, and on earlier examples the barrel is thicker than on the original, and the receiver cover is slightly wider. They were made entirely from steel stampings, causing it to weigh more (3.73 kg (8.2 lb)). Main difference between Ero and Uzi was in the rate of burst fire, which was 600 rounds/min for the Uzi and 650 rounds/min for the Ero). It uses the 32-round magazine as standard but can use any 9 mm Uzi-interface magazine of 25 rounds or larger.

After producing the Ero, Končar Arma Grupa d.o.o. started making some design changes. With the Mini-Ero, they picked a size in between that of the Mini-Uzi and Micro-Uzi, and also used a stock taken from the vz.61 Škorpion. The barrel length is 125 mm and Mini-Ero has a closed bolt compared to its original counterpart. The weight of the Mini-Ero is 2.2 kg (4.85 lb) empty. The length is 545.5 mm (21.47 in) with the folding stock extended and only 250 mm (9.84 in) with the stock folded. It uses standard Micro Uzi magazine (32 rounds).

=== BA93 and BA94 ===
The BA93 and BA94 are Myanmar made clones of the Uzi. Production started in Myanmar after 1991 when an Israeli delegation visited the country and supplied the Tatmadaw with Uzis. It also included the rights to manufacture the Uzi under license.

The BA93 is based on the Uzi, but with a longer barrel and fixed stock. It was introduced in 1993. It is commonly seen with Myanmar soldiers and special forces units operating in commando or VIP protection operations.

The BA94 was introduced in 1994. Improvements made include moving the charging handle from the top to the left with a shorter barrel. This model is mostly seen with Myanma police forces.

As of 2018, both weapons were renamed MA-13.

=== Norinco Model 320 ===
Norinco of China manufactures an unlicensed copy of the Uzi Model B that is sold as the Model 320. Early versions were marked "POLICE Model" in English. Modifications were made to avoid the US Assault Weapon Import Ban: the folding stock was replaced with a wooden thumbhole stock, the barrel nut was welded in place, and the bayonet lug was removed. The gun had a gray parkerized finish, a 410 millimetres (16 in) carbine-length barrel and is 800 millimetres (31 in) overall.

=== TK-K12 ===
The TK-K12 (or TL-K12) is a Vietnamese clone of the IMI Micro Uzi since 2013.

=== Zastava M97 ===
The Zastava M97 is a Serbian clone of the Mini Uzi. Two variants consist of the M97 with an 8 in (200 mm) barrel and the M97K with a 6.5 in (170 mm) barrel and no folding stock with a vertical foregrip permanent attached.

=== Hamas clone ===
From 1993 to 1996, Hamas manufactured a total of 350 Uzi clones, until its production was dismantled by the Palestinian Security Services' intelligence unit led by Moussa Arafat.

== Users ==
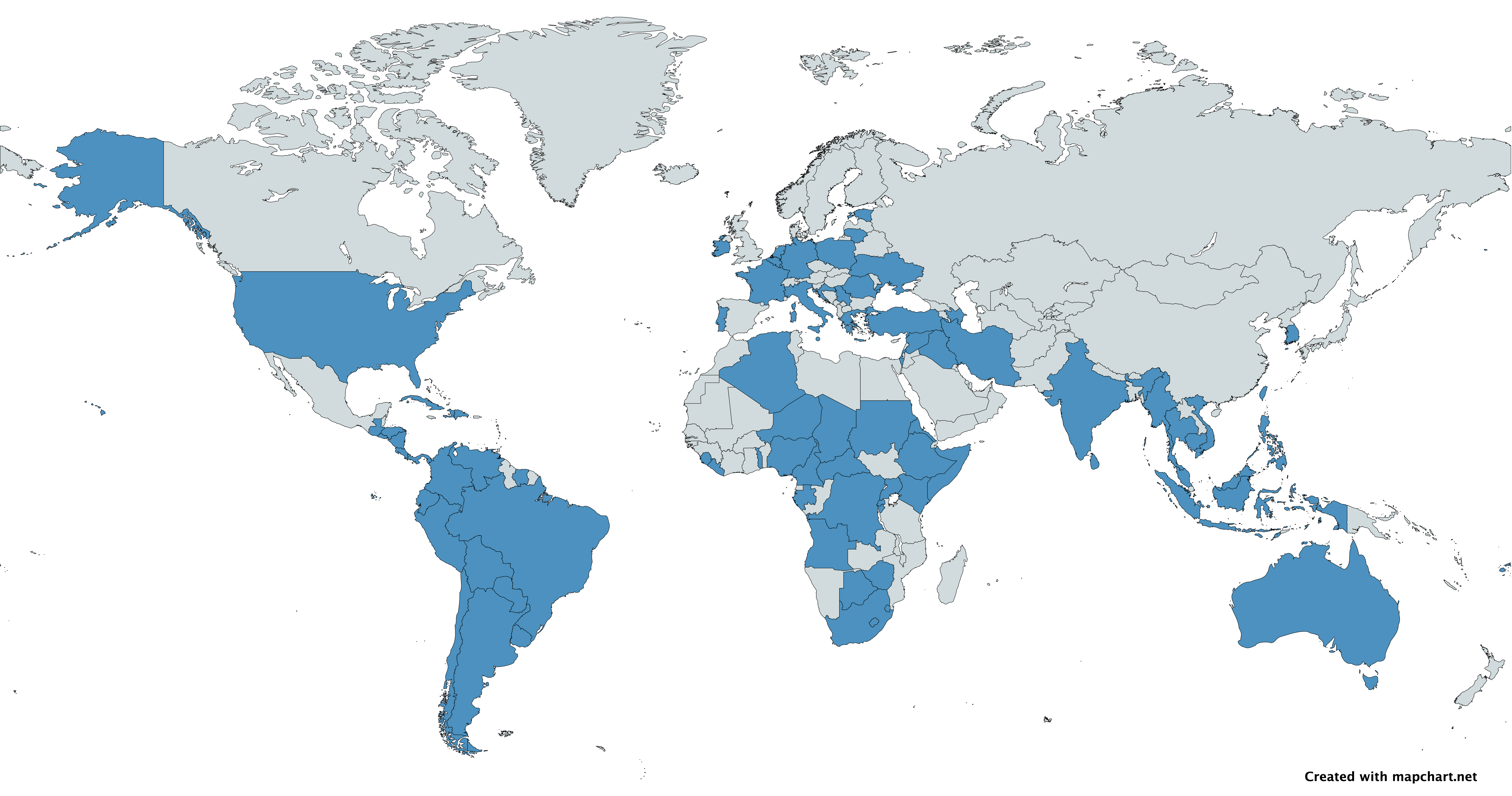
A map with users of the Uzi in blue

=== Africa ===
- Algeria
- Angola
- Botswana
- Burundi: Burundian rebels
- Cameroon
- Central African Republic
- Chad
- Democratic Republic of Congo
- Eritrea
- Eswatini
- Ethiopia
- Gabon
- Kenya
- Lesotho
- Liberia
- Niger
- Nigeria
- Rwanda
- Sierra Leone: Croatian made Ero and Mini-Ero in use.
- Somalia
- South Africa: Manufactured under license as the S1 by Lyttelton Engineering Works.
- Sudan
- Togo
- Uganda
- Zimbabwe
  - Rhodesia: Former user, manufactured under license.

=== Asia ===
- Azerbaijan
- Cambodia
- India: Uzi was used by the Special Protection Group until 2008, when it was replaced with the FN P90. Micro Uzi variants are still used by Para SF of the Indian Army.
- Indonesia
- Iraq
- Iran
- Israel: Uzi and Mini Uzi variants. Mini Uzi variant was used by the YAMAM elite unit and Shin Bet.
- Malaysia: Used by Unit Tindakan Khas
- Myanmar: Locally produced under model number BA93 (wooden stock) and BA94 with, used mainly by Myanmar Police Force and Special Operation Task Force.
- Philippines
- South Korea: Issued to special forces in the 1970s. Later replaced by the Daewoo K1
- Sri Lanka
- Syria: limited usage
- Taiwan
- Thailand
- Turkey
- Vietnam - People's Army news (Báo Quân đội nhân dân) informed that Technical Department of Special Operation Command (Sapper) had a project to design and manufacture calibration device for MARS attached on Micro Uzi.

=== Europe ===
- Belgium: Made under license by FN Herstal, used by the Belgian gendarmerie.
- Croatia: Produces unlicensed copies of the Uzi and Micro Uzi called the ERO and Mini ERO respectively.
- Estonia: Uses the Mini Uzi variant.
- France
- Germany: Made under license as MP2.
- Greece
- Ireland: Used by the Garda Regional Support Unit. Formerly available in each Garda District HQ to suitably trained plainclothes officers.
- Italy: The Mini Uzi variant results by official schedules to be in the inventories of the Italian National Police. A local version called the Type 821-SMG was manufactured from 1984 to 1989 by the SOCIMI - Società Costruzioni Industriali Milano, S.p.A. in Milan.
- Lithuania: Lithuanian Armed Forces.
- Luxembourg
- Malta
- Netherlands
- Poland
- Portugal: Portuguese Army.
- Romania: Mini Uzi variant is used by the Military Police.
- Serbia: Used by the Military Police Battalion Cobra.
- Ukraine

=== North America ===
- Bermuda: Bermuda Regiment.
- Costa Rica
- Cuba
- Dominican Republic
- El Salvador
- Guatemala
- Haiti: Uzi and Mini Uzi variants used by Haitian National Police.
- Honduras: Uzi and Mini Uzi variants.
- Nicaragua
- Panama
- United States: From 1968 to 1973, the CIA bought 3,000 Uzis for use in Southeast Asia by Direct Action operatives and Special Forces troops. From the 1960s to 1990s, The US Secret Service's VIP details used a chopped-down model that could be concealed in a briefcase.

=== Oceania ===
- Australia
- Fiji
- Tonga

=== South America ===
- Argentina
- Bolivia
- Brazil: Mini Uzi variant.
- Chile Carabineros de Chile.
- Colombia
- Ecuador
- Paraguay
- Peru: Uzi, Mini Uzi, and Micro Uzi variants.
- Suriname
- Uruguay
- Venezuela

=== Non-state users ===
- Provisional Irish Republican Army

== Gallery ==
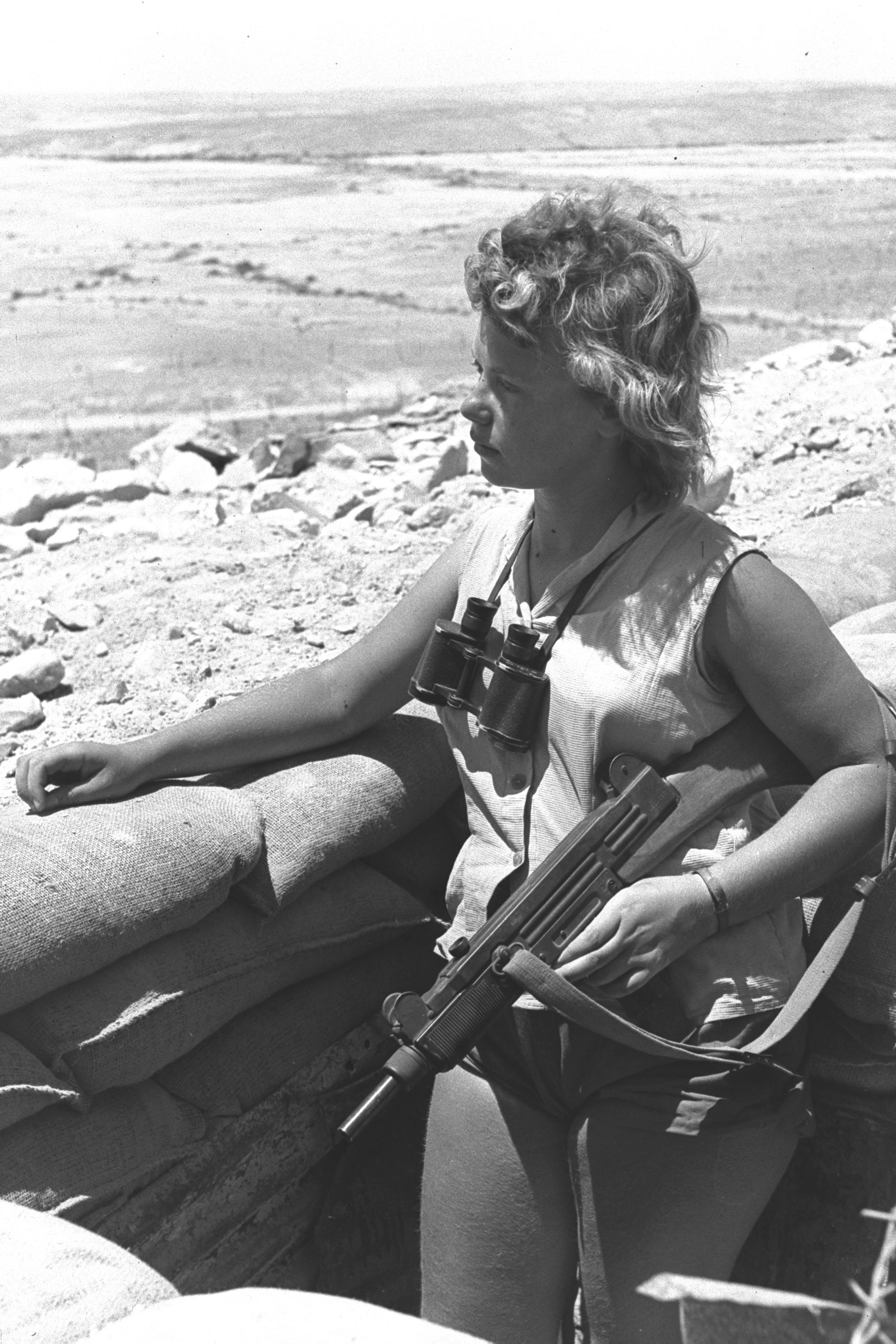
An Uzi-armed Israeli woman on guard duty in the Negev (1956), note wooden stock

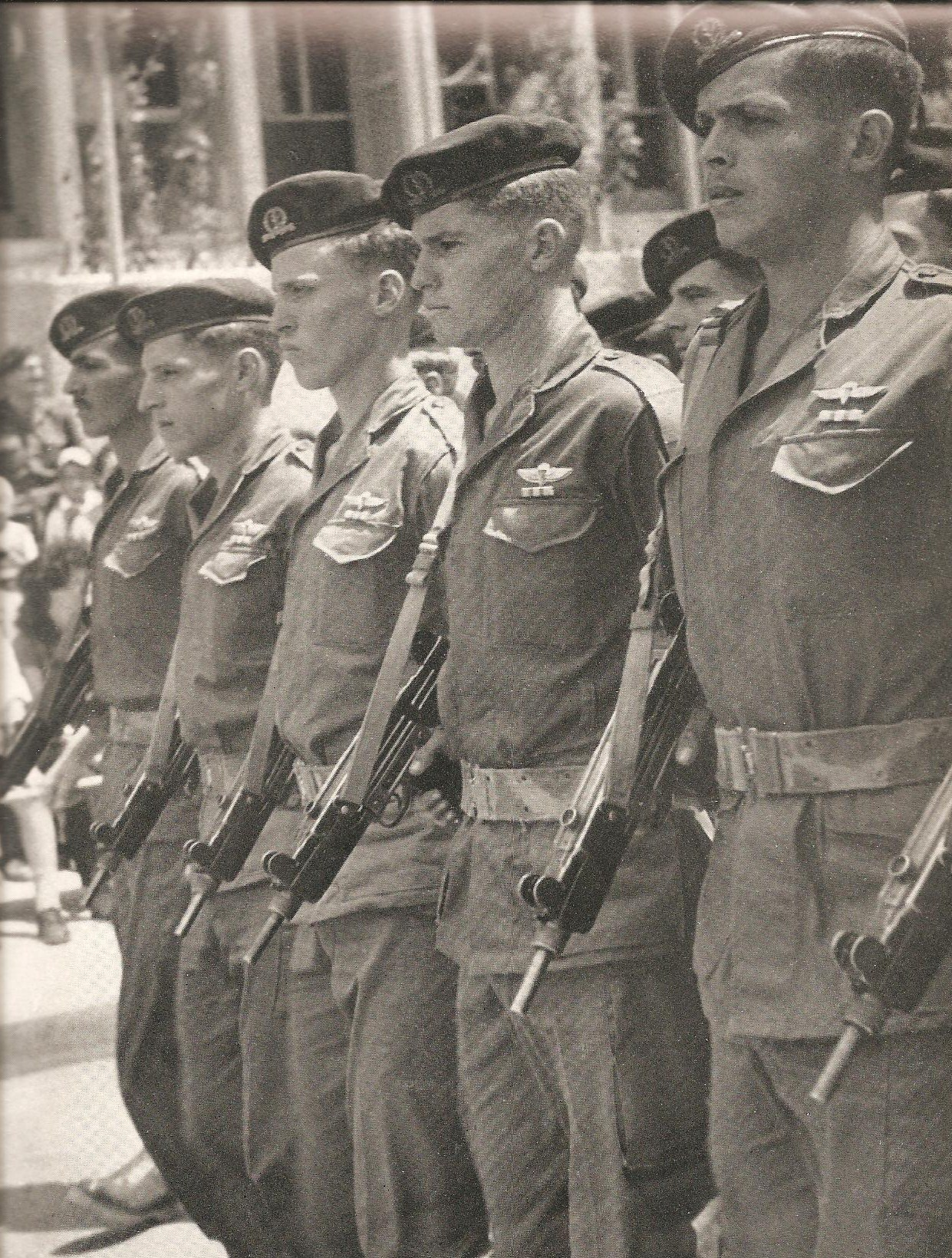
Israeli paratroopers armed with Uzis in 1958

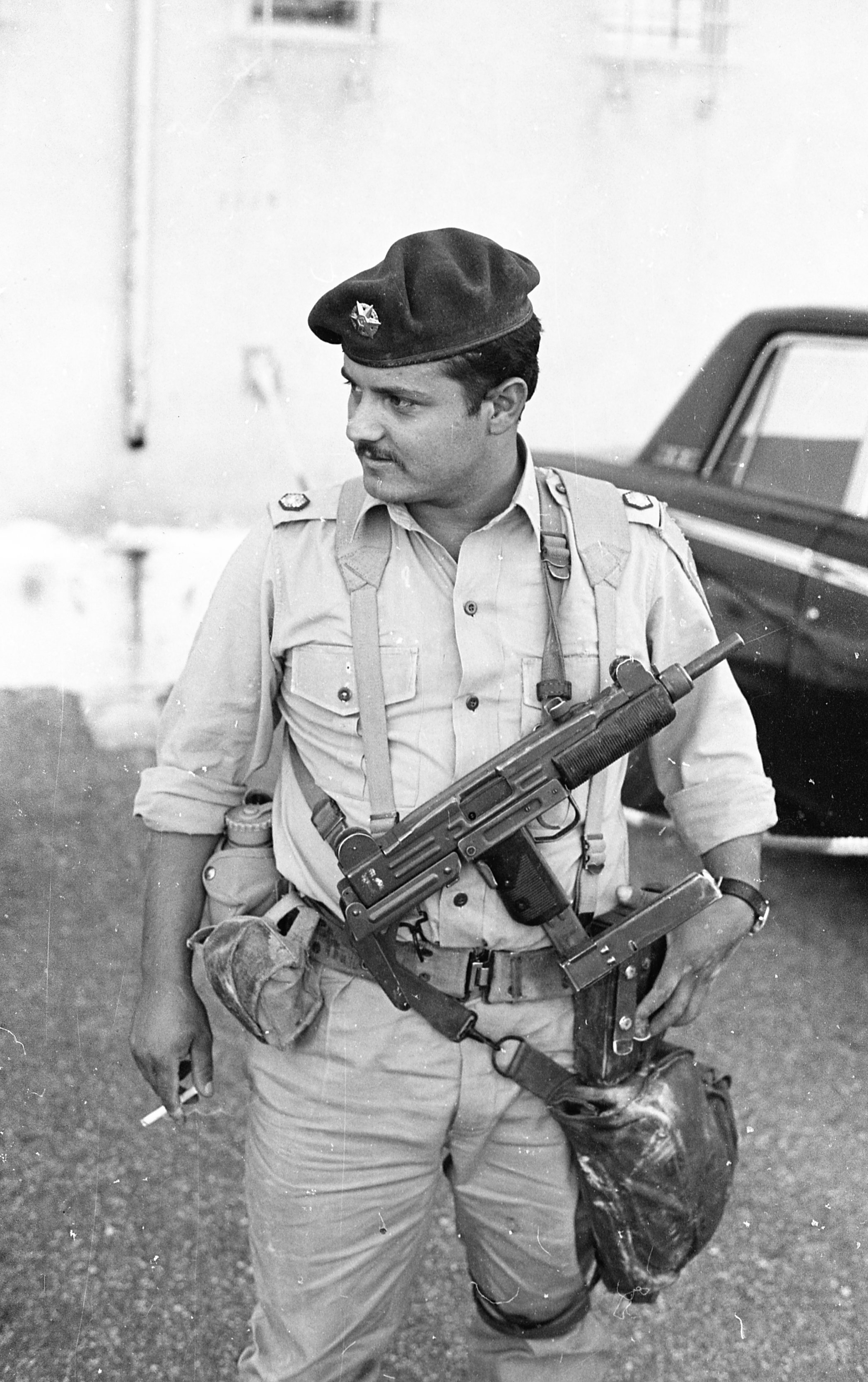
An IDF Bedouin soldier with an Uzi equipped with a mag clip (1969)

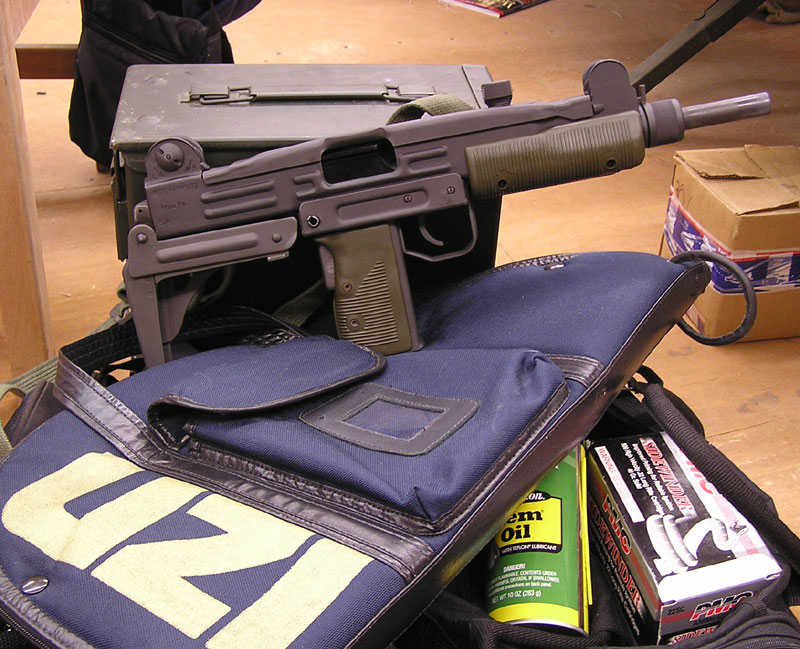
An Uzi submachine gun

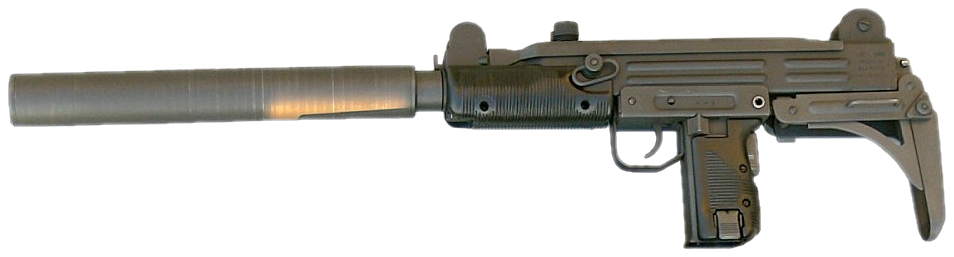
Uzi with suppressor

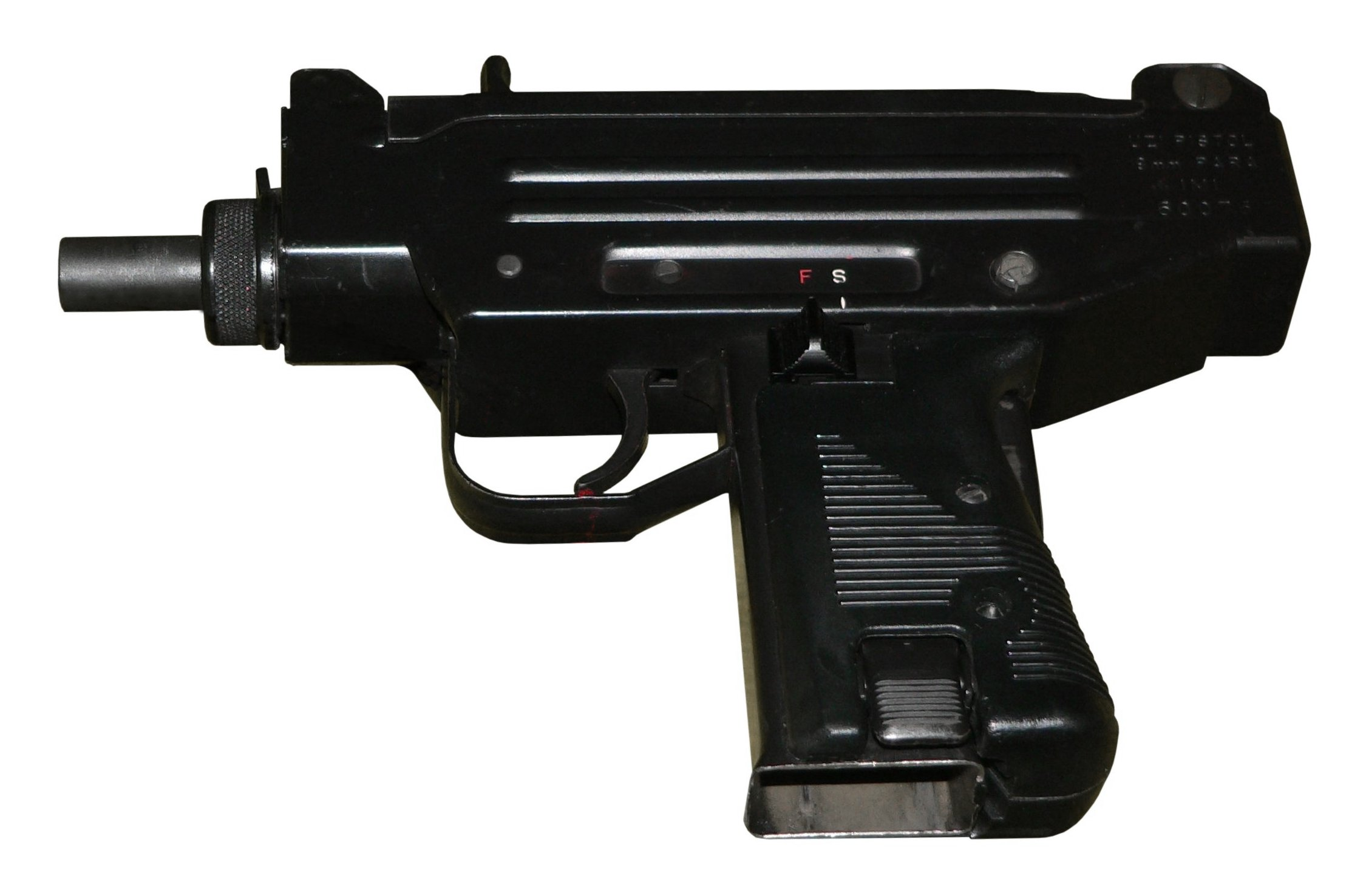
An Uzi pistol

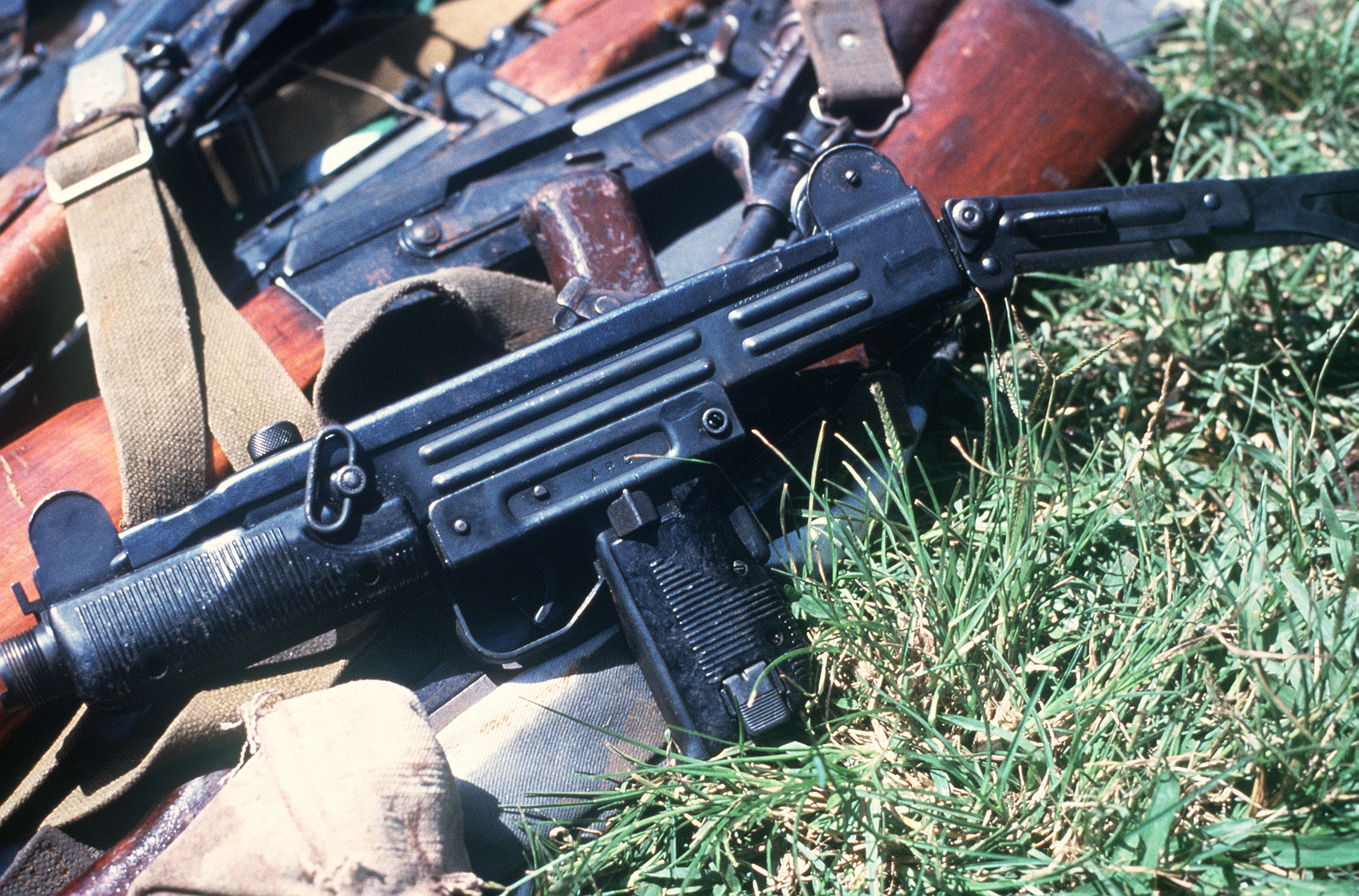
An Uzi seized during Operation Urgent Fury

== In popular culture ==
In over 200 action films from Hollywood film studies, as well as other major studies worldwide, action heroes and antiheroes are shown frantically firing from an Uzi held in one hand, or even from two Uzis held in two hands. On a webpage on the subject of the Uzi manufacturer, Israel Weapon Industries contains a list of notable films of this type, starting with the 1976 Raid on Entebbe. IWI says that Arnold Schwarzenegger fired more rounds from an Uzi than all other action heroes, including James Bond, Charles Bronson, Jackie Chan, Keanu Reeves, Chuck Norris, Michael Douglas, John Travolta, Vincent Cassel, and Ed Harris. The creator of the Uzi, Uziel Gal, was a consultant on Terminator 2, where he gave lessons to Linda Hamilton, who played Sarah Connor, the main female protagonist. Charlie Gao of The National Interest suggests that the surge of the Uzi's cultural popularity was because it was the first widespread machine gun of modern design after the bulky ones originating in World War II era.

== See also ==
- List of equipment of the Israel Defense Forces
- ASMI
- Colt 9mm SMG – Submachine gun manufactured by Colt
- Daewoo Telecom K7 – Submachine gun
- FB PM-63 – Polish submachine gun
- MAC-10 – American machine pistol
- Minebea PM-9 – Japanese machine pistol
- Modern Sub Machine Carbine – Indian submachine gun
- MP7 – German series of submachine guns/personal defence weapons
- PM-84 Glauberyt – Polish submachine gun
- PP-2000
- Ruger MP9 – American submachine gun/machine pistol
- SR-2 Veresk
