= SANA (drug) =

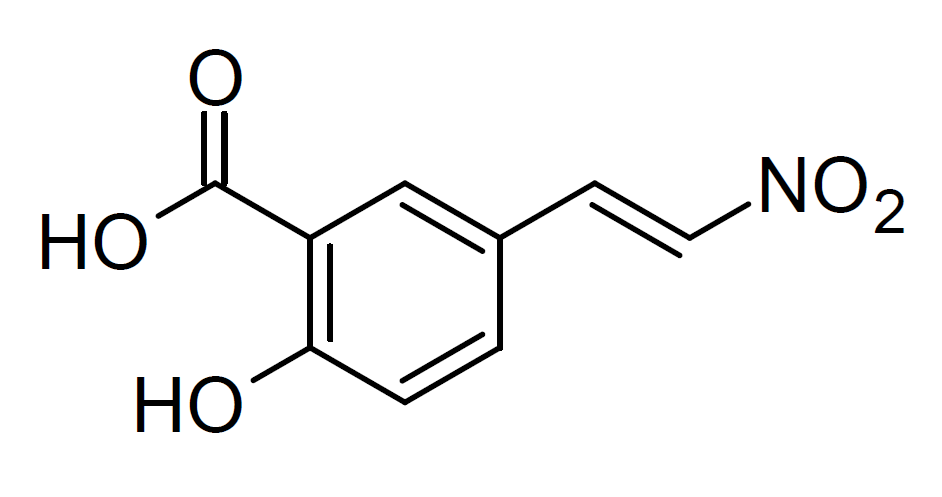

Identifiers
- IUPAC name: 2-hydroxy-5-(2-nitroethenyl)benzoic acid
- CAS Number: 42571-07-3
- PubChem CID: 54133300

Chemical and physical data
- Formula: C_{9}H_{7}NO_{5}
- Molar mass: 209.157 g·mol^{−1}
- 3D model (JSmol): Interactive image
- SMILES: C1=CC(=C(C=C1C=C[N+](=O)[O-])C(=O)O)O
- InChI: InChI=1S/C9H7NO5/c11-8-2-1-6(3-4-10(14)15)5-7(8)9(12)13/h1-5,11H,(H,12,13); Key:NVWQBWPWSNPTBM-UHFFFAOYSA-N

SANA (MVD1) is an experimental drug with thermogenic effects which has been researched as a potential weight loss medication.

== See also ==
- 2,4-Dinitrophenol
- 5-Amino-1-methylquinolinium
