= Saana (given name) =

Given name list

Saana is a feminine given name. It was first used in Finland during the 19th century. Its Finnish version is derived from Saana, a fell in Enontekiö, Finland. Notable people with the name include:

- Saana Murray (1925–2011), New Zealand author and weaver
- Sanna Saarinen (born 1991), Finnish football player
- Saana Saarteinen (born 1993), Finnish tennis player
- Saana Svärd (born 1977), Finnish Assyriologist
- Saana Valkama (born 1994), Finnish ice hockey player
- Saana Wang (born 1979), Finnish fine art photographer
