= Telescoping bolt =

Technology in firearms

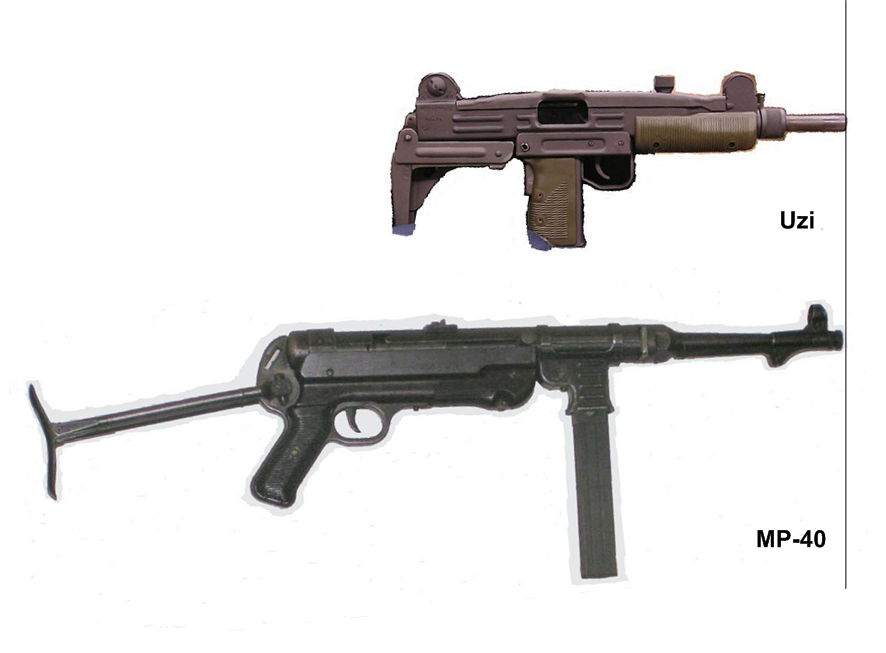
Two 9×19mm submachine guns with 250 mm (10 inch) barrels, an Uzi (with a telescoping bolt) and MP40 (without), showing the compactness a telescoping mechanism allows

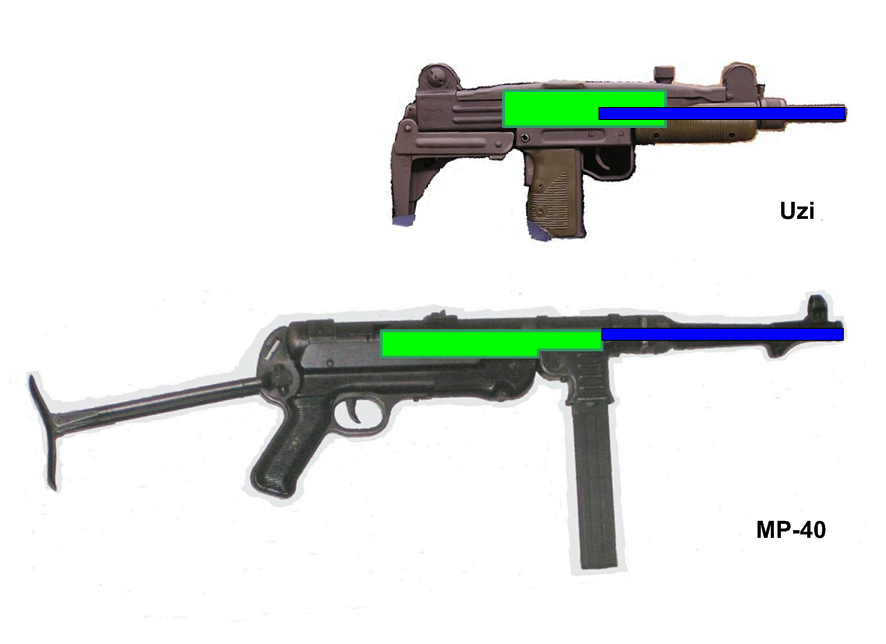
Internal mechanisms of the above submachine guns. Barrels are blue, bolts are green.

A telescoping bolt (also known as an overhung bolt) is a firearm bolt which wraps around and past (or telescopes over) the breech end of the barrel. This feature reduces the length of a weapon such as a submachine gun significantly, and it allows compact designs to be balanced around the pistol grip in a way that gives "pointability" more like a pistol's.

While it would be simpler and easier to shorten the bolt to fit completely behind the breech, the bolt must have a certain amount of mass in order to operate reliably with a given caliber. The telescoping bolt moves some of that mass forward of the bolt face, resulting in a bolt which may be longer overall, but is shorter behind the bolt face.

Though technically a different, distinct concept, nearly all telescoping bolt submachine guns use a magazine located in the pistol grip used to hold and fire the weapon. However, there are blowback firearms with the magazine located in the grip that do not use a telescoping bolt, such as the Kel-Tec SUB-2000.

== History ==
The telescoping bolt concept first appeared on semi-automatic handguns around the turn of the 20th century. These pistols, starting with the FN M1900 and to continuing to the present, often feature a slide, which acts as both a barrel shroud and the bolt. Moreover, a Belgian pocket pistol patented in 1909 featured a cylindrical bolt wrapped around the barrel instead of a now-conventional slide, which is sometimes claimed to be the first true telescoping bolt design.

One of the earliest submachine gun known to use the telescoping bolt concept was the Italian Armaguerra OG-43, followed by the OG-44, designed by Giovanni Oliani during the later stages of the Second World War. The bolt was "L" shaped and ran in a tube above the chamber and barrel. Both designs did not reach mass production due to wartime events.

The first production model submachine gun using a telescoping bolt was the Czechoslovak Cz 23 aka Sa.23 or vz.48b series, first produced in 1948. These submachine guns use a cylindrical telescoping bolt with centered barrel. While widely exported in the third world, the Cz 23 series was not well known in the west.

The first popularly well-known example was the Uzi submachine gun, designed in Israel by Uziel Gal, a designer inspired by the Cz 23 series. It uses a rectangular bolt, with a barrel which is offset toward the bottom of the bolt. This configuration places the axis of recoil lower, increasing the controllability of the weapon in full-automatic fire. The Uzi was designed in 1948 after the first models of the Cz 23 were seen, and entered service in 1954 (after official adoption in 1951).

The telescoping bolt has subsequently been used in a wide variety of submachine gun designs.

== Comparisons ==
As the image diagrams demonstrate, the basic concept of a telescoping bolt with the magazine well in the handgrip produces significantly more compact weapons. These diagrams show the 1938 design (1939 service) MP-40 submachine gun, which is 630 mm (25 inch) long with the stock folded, weighing four kilograms (8.8 pounds) and having a 251 mm (9.9 inch) barrel, and the (similar materials and production technology) Uzi, a 1948 design (1951 adoption with 1954 service), which is 470 mm (19 inch) long with the stock folded, weighing 3.5 kilograms (7.7 pounds) and having a 260 mm (10.2 inch) barrel.

Utilizing nothing more than a configuration change, and the same materials and fabrication technologies, the Uzi is thus 500 grams (1.1 lb) lighter and 160 mm (6 inches) shorter overall, despite having a longer barrel by 9 mm (0.3 inch).

== Examples ==
=== Submachine guns ===
- Cz 23 series
- Uzi
- Cellini-Dunn SM-9/SM-90
- MGP-15
- MAC-10
- Alpha GPI
- Patria submachine gun
- Steyr MPi 69 and MPi 81

=== Rifles ===
- Gustloff Volkssturmgewehr
