= Sanae =

- Pronunciation: [sa̠na̠e̞]
- Gender: Unisex

Origin
- Origin: Japan
- Meaning: "Now, already" (早) and "young plant, seedling" (苗); "sand" (沙) and "young plant, seedling" (苗)
- Region of origin: Japanese

Sanae (written: 早苗 or 沙苗) is a name that is typically given to girls in contemporary Japan, but can also be given to boys. Notable people with the name include:

- Sanae Jōnouchi (城之内 早苗; born 1968), Japanese enka singer, actress and radio presenter
- Sanae Kobayashi (小林 沙苗; born 1980), Japanese voice actress
- Sanae Kikuta (菊田 早苗; born 1971), Japanese mixed martial artist
- Sanae Takagi (高木 早苗; born 1955), Japanese voice actress
- Sanae Takaichi (高市 早苗; born 1961), Prime Minister of Japan
- Sanae Takasugi (高杉 早苗; 1918–1995), Japanese actress
- Sanae Tsuchida (土田 早苗; born 1949), Japanese actress
- Sanae Miyuki (深雪 さなえ; born 1959), Japanese voice actress
- Sanae Mishima (三島 早苗; born 1957), Japanese former football player
- Sanae Motokawa (本川 紗奈生; born 1992), Japanese basketball player
- Sanae Nakahara (中原 早苗; 1935 – 2012), Japanese actress

== Fictional characters ==
- Sanae Kochiya (東風谷 早苗), a character in Mountain of Faith from the Touhou Project series
- Sanae Furukawa (古河 早苗), a character from Clannad
- Sanae Shioda (汐田 早苗), a character from Battle Royale II: Requiem
- Sanae Dekomori (凸守 早苗), a character from Love, Chunibyo & Other Delusions
- Sanae Nakazawa (中沢 早苗), a character from Captain Tsubasa
