= List of World War II weapons of Spain =

This is a list of weapons used by Spain during World War II. Francoist Spain remained neutral throughout the world war, but Spanish dictator Francisco Franco had Axis sympathies due to Fascist Italy and Nazi Germany helping him win the Spanish Civil War. This list is only for Spain and does not cover the Blue Division, which was a part of the Wehrmacht and not the Spanish Army.

== Small arms ==
=== Rifles ===
- Mauser Model 1893
- Spanish M43 Mauser (Spanish K98k)
- Mauser Gewehr 98
- Vetterli-Vitali M1887/15
- Steyr-Mannlicher M1895
- Mannlicher M1888
- Destroyer Carbine
- El Tigre: Spanish copy of the American Winchester Model 1892
- Remington Rolling Block

=== Pistols ===
- Astra 400
- Star Model 14
- Astra M903
- Astra 600
- Ruby M1915
- Campo-Giro
- Bergmann-Bayard Model 1903: Produced under Spanish license
- Pistol F. Ascaso
- JO.LO.AR.
- Gaztañaga Destroyer
- Mauser C96 M30
- Browning FN M1903
- Beretta Model 1934

=== Revolver ===
- MAS Model 1892
- Webley Bull Dog
- Orbea M1884: Spanish licensed production of the American Smith & Wesson Model 3
- Mauser C78

=== Machine guns ===
- Hotchkiss Mle 1914 machine gun
- MG08
- Darne M1918
- Maxim Gun
- ZB vz. 26
- ZB vz. 30: less than 1000 delivered from an order of 20,000
- ALFA M44

=== Submachine guns ===
- Erma EMP: large amounts acquired during the Spanish Civil War and copied and produced locally as the MP41/44
- Bergmann MP 28/II
- MP 38
- Star Si 35
- Arsenal M23
- Labora Fontbernat M-1938
- Star Model Z-45 (copy mp40)

== Artillery ==
=== Field artillery ===
- Canon de 75 modèle 1897

=== Heavy artillery ===
- Canon de 155 C modèle 1917 Schneider

== Armoured fighting vehicles (AFVs) ==
- Panzerkampfwagen I
- L3/33
- T-26
- Panzer IV H
- Sturmgeschütz III
