= MP 28 =

MP 28 or MP-28 may refer to:

- Chattian, MP 28, a stage during the Oligocene epoch
- MP 28, a German submachine gun, a development of the MP 18
