= M1938 =

M1938 or M-1938 can refer to:

- M1938 mortar, a Soviet infantry mortar
- M1938 howitzer (M-30), a Soviet howitzer
- Labora Fontbernat M-1938, a Spanish submachine gun
- M1938 (rifle), Modello 1938, Italian short rifle
