= 9×23mm Largo =

Pistol cartridge

9mm Bergmann–Bayard, 9mm Largo
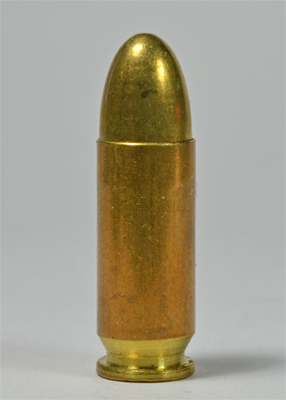
- Type: Pistol
- Place of origin: German Empire

Service history
- In service: 1905−1980s (Spain)
- Used by: Spain; Denmark

Production history
- Designer: Theodor Bergmann and Hugo Schmeisser
- Designed: 1903

Specifications
- Case type: Rimless, tapered
- Bullet diameter: 9.0 mm (0.35 in)
- Base diameter: 9.91 mm (0.390 in)
- Rim diameter: 9.9 mm (0.39 in)
- Rim thickness: 12.7 mm (0.50 in)
- Case length: 23.1 mm (0.91 in)
- Overall length: 33.53 mm (1.320 in)
- Primer type: Small pistol

Ballistic performance
| Bullet mass/type | Velocity | Energy |
|---|---|---|
| 8.2 g (127 gr) FMJ | 400 m/s (1,300 ft/s) | 656 J (484 ft⋅lbf) |
| 8.03 g (124 gr) JHP | 363 m/s (1,190 ft/s) | 529 J (390 ft⋅lbf) |

The 9×23mm Largo (9mm Largo, 9mm Bergmann–Bayard, 9mm Bayard Long) centerfire pistol cartridge was developed in 1903 for the Bergmann–Bayard pistol. It was adopted by the Spanish and Danish militaries, with the former using it until the 1980s, when it was replaced by the 9×19mm Parabellum.

== Description ==
The cartridge has a rimless straight-tapered brass, Berdan-primed case. The 8.2 grams (127 gr) bullet is round nosed, lead-cored with a gilded steel jacket. The cartridge has a total weight of 8.75 g (135.0 gr). Original Spanish military loads have a muzzle velocity of 400 m/s (1,300 ft/s) and a muzzle energy of 656 joules. According to Ian V. Hogg and John Weeks, it was the most powerful cartridge successfully used on blowback pistols, such as the Astra 400.

The 9×23mm Largo and the 9×23mm Steyr have almost identical dimensions, but they can be distinguished by the gilded jacketed bullet on the former, and the Austrian headstamp on the latter. The 9mm Largo is also very similar to the 9×23mm Winchester, but the latter should not be fired in Largo firearms due to the higher pressure generated by modern Winchester loadings.

== History ==
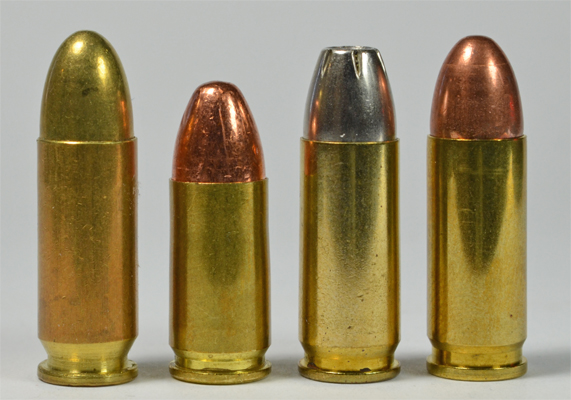
Left to right: 9×23mm Largo, 9×19mm Parabellum, 9×23mm Winchester, and 9×23mm Steyr

The 9mm Largo was developed by Theodor Bergmann and Hugo Schmeisser for the Bergmann–Bayard 1903 pistol.

This pistol was adopted by the Spanish army in 1905 as the "Pistola Bergmann de 9 mm. modelo 1905". Unable to find a German manufacturer to complete the Spanish order for 3,000 pistols, Bergmann turned to a Belgian manufacturer, Anciens Etablissements Pieper (who used the trademark "Bayard"), to complete the order. The final pistol, modified by AEP, was known as the "Bergmann Bayard 1908", or in Spain as the "Pistola Bergmann de 9 mm. modelo 1908". Although adopted in 1908, first deliveries did not take place until the next year. Meanwhile, other manufacturers such as Campo-Giro had adopted the 9mm Bergmann–Bayard round and, due to its long history of use in Spanish submachine guns, carbines and pistols, today it is most commonly known as the "9mm Largo".

In 1910, the Bergmann–Bayard model 1910 semi-automatic pistol was adopted by the Danish military. By 1918, the Bergmann-Bayard was considered obsolete and production was discontinued, though about 1,000 pistols were assembled circa 1918−1920. The Spanish continued using the 9mm Largo in military and police weapons until the 1980s, when it was finally replaced by the 9×19mm Parabellum.

The cartridge was produced by Deutsche Waffen- und Munitionsfabriken (DWM), Deutsche Metallpatronenfabrik (incorporated into DWM in 1903), Santa Bárbara Sistemas, and CCI-Speer.

== Firearms chambered for 9mm Largo ==
Anciens Establissements Pieper (AEP)

- Bergmann Mars
- Bergmann–Bayard pistol

Berthodl Geipel’s Erfurter Maschinenfabrik

- VMP(Vollmer) EMP/MPE Erma submachine gun, Spanish made copy called m41/44.

Astra-Unceta y Cia SA

- Esperanza y Unceta Campo-Giro Modelo 1912, 1913, 1913–16
- Esperanza y Unceta Astra 400 (Modelo 1921), 1921–1926
- Unceta y Compania Astra 400 (Modelo 1921), 1926–1945 or 1946
- Astra Model F (selective fire 'broomhandle' type pistol) 1934–1935
- Astra A-80
- Astra Custom SPS (IPSC racegun) 1996–?

Arrizabalaga

- Arrizabalaga Sharp-Shooter
- Arrizabalaga JO.LO.AR., 1924–?

CETME

- A.D.S.A. Model 1953 submachine gun 1953–?
- CETME C2 submachine gun

Comissió d'Industries de Guerra (CIG)

- Pistol Isard Isard Pistol

Destroyer carbine and similar 9mm Largo carbines

- Ayra Duria et al.
- Jose Luis Maquibar
- Onena Carbine
- Ignacio Zubillaga

Fábrica de Armas, A Coruña

- Modelo 1941/44 submachine gun (copy of the Vollmer Erma in 9mm Largo) 1941 – mid 1950s
- Copy of the Bergmann MP28 in 9mm Largo
- "No maker" Astra 400 (Modelo 1921), 1938–1940s

Fontbernat

- Labora Fontbernat M-1938 submachine gun

Llama

- Gabilondo Llama Modelo IV
- Gabilondo Llama Modelo V
- Gabilondo Llama Modelo VII
- Gabilondo Llama Modelo VIII
- Gabilondo Llama Modelo Extra

Parinco

- Model 3R submachine gun 1959–?

Republica Española

- "Naranjero" submachine gun (Modified Bergmann MP28)
- RE (Republica Española) made Astra 400 (Modelo 1921), 1936–1939
- Pistol F. Ascaso 1937–1939

Star Bonifacio Echeverria

- Bonifacio Echeverria Star Modelo Militar 1920, 1920–1921
- Bonifacio Echeverria Star Modelo Militar 1921, 1921 only
- Bonifacio Echeverria Star Modelo Militar 1922, 1922–1931
- Bonifacio Echeverria Star Modelo A (early w/flat backstrap), 1924–1931
- Bonifacio Echeverria Star Modelo A (late w/1911 Colt-style backstrap),1931–1983
- Bonifacio Echeverria Star Modelo M (slightly larger than A), 1931–1983
- Bonifacio Echeverria Star Modelo MD (M w/selective fire), 1931–1983
- Bonifacio Echeverria Star Modelo Super-A (A w/quick takedown), 1946–1983
- Bonifacio Echeverria Star Modelo Super-M (M w/quick takedown), 1946–1983
- Bonifacio Echeverria Star Modelo AS (A w/magazine safety, quick takedown, loaded chamber indicator), 1956–1983
- Bonifacio Echeverria Star Modelo MS (M w/quick takedown, loaded chamber indicator), 1956–1983
- Star Model Z-45 Submachine gun
- Model Z-62 submachine gun

== See also ==
- 9 mm caliber
