= Gaztañaga =

Gaztañaga is a Basque surname. Notable people with the surname include:

- Jon Gaztañaga, (1991–), Spanish professional association footballer
- Mikel Gaztañaga, (1979–), Spanish road racing cyclist
- Patricia Gaztañaga (1966–), Spanish TV presenter

== See also ==
- Gaztañaga Destroyer, a gun designed by Isidro Gaztañaga
