= Pistol Isard =

- Type: Semi-automatic pistol
- Place of origin: Spain

Service history
- In service: 1937–1939
- Used by: Second Spanish Republic
- Wars: Spanish Civil War

Production history
- Designer: Comisión de Industrias de Guerra
- Designed: 1937
- Manufacturer: Comisión de Industrias de Guerra
- Produced: 1937–1938

Specifications
- Length: 8.25 in (210 mm)
- Barrel length: 5 in (130 mm)
- Cartridge: 9x23mm Largo
- Action: Double action, Blowback
- Muzzle velocity: 356 m/s (1,170 ft/s)
- Feed system: 8-round detachable box magazine
- Sights: Iron sights

The Isard Pistol is a semi-automatic pistol that fires the 9x23mm Largo from a Blowback operated system. It was designed and produced by the Comisión de Industrias de Guerra (CIG ) (War Industry Commission in English), by orders of the Generalitat of Catalonia during the Spanish Civil War (1936–1939).

== History ==
The Isard pistol was designed by the CIG and some exiled Basque gunsmiths. It was ordered and approved by the Generalidad de Cataluña, and was put into production. Total production was approximately 300 units.

== Design ==
Stylistically, the Isard's design resembled the M1911 pistol. However, the Colt M1911 incorporated a locked-breech design and used a .45 ACP round, whereas the Isard pistol was a blowback design and used a 9x23mm Largo round.

Two models of the pistols were made. The first model was made with a one part body of the gun (like almost every gun). The second model had several small changes.

== See also ==
- Labora Fontbernat M-1938
- Pistol F. Ascaso
