= Mars pistol =

Mars pistol can refer to:

- Webley Mars - an early British semi-automatic pistol
- Bergmann Mars - an early German semi-automatic pistol
