= Bergmann–Bayard pistol =

Bergmann–Bayard pistol Model 1903, 1908, 1910, 1910–21
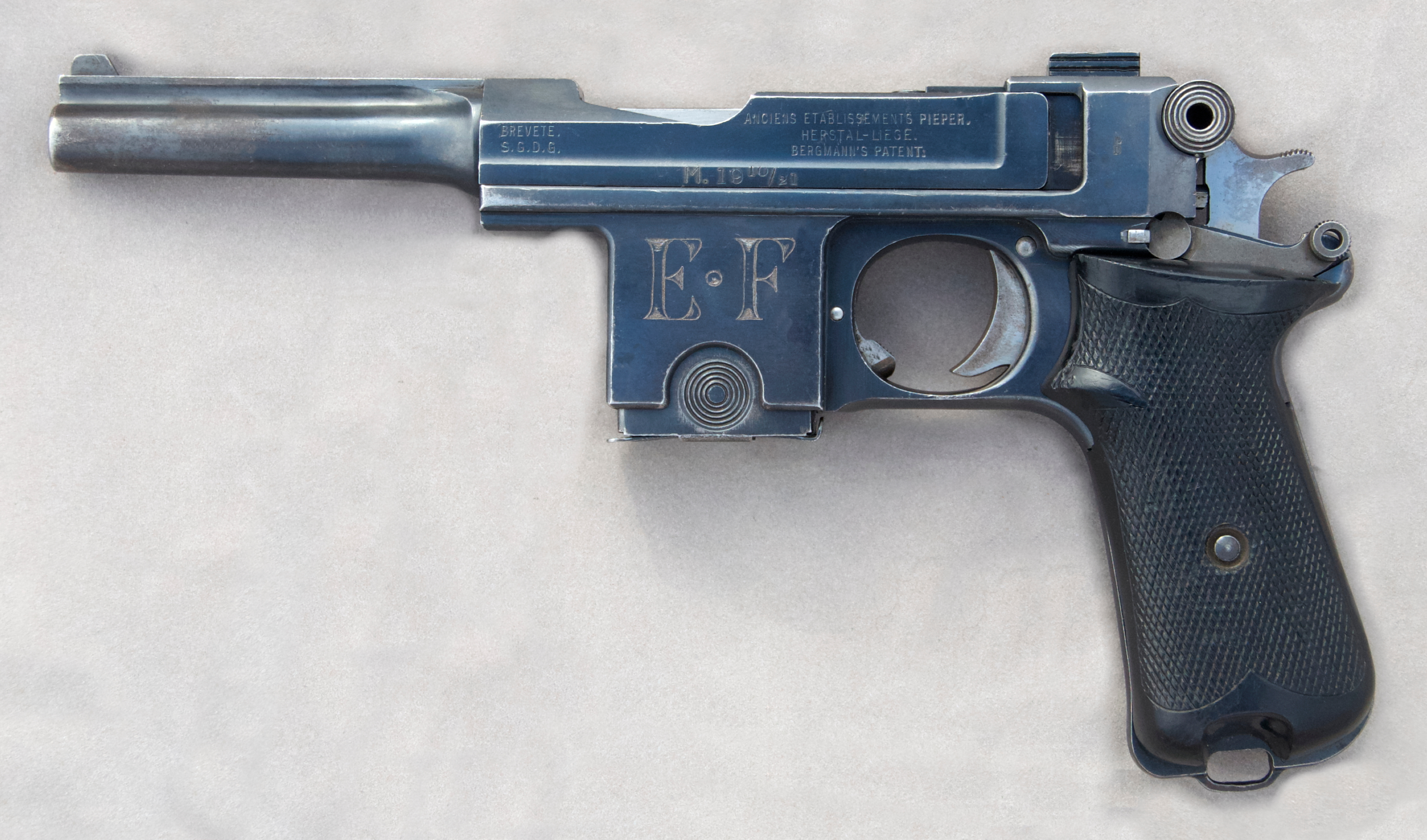
- Bergmann–Bayard pistol
- Type: Semi-automatic pistol
- Place of origin: Belgium; German Empire

Service history
- Used by: See Users
- Wars: World War I; Finnish Civil War; Rif War; Spanish Civil War; German invasion of Denmark; World War II

Production history
- Designer: Theodor Bergmann
- Designed: 1901–1910
- Manufacturer: Anciens Etablissements Pieper, Herstal, Belgium
- Produced: 1901–1914; 1922–1935 (Denmark)
- No. built: ~12,000 to military users and ~15,500 in total
- Variants: Bergmann Mars (1901), Model 1903, Model 1908, Model 1910, Model 1910/21

Specifications (Model 1910/21)
- Mass: 1.02 kg (2 lb 4 oz)
- Length: 254 mm (10 in)
- Barrel length: 101 mm (4 in)
- Cartridge: 9mm Largo
- Caliber: 9mm
- Action: locked breech
- Muzzle velocity: 350 m/s (1,100 ft/s)
- Effective firing range: 100 m (110 yd)
- Feed system: 6- or 10-round removable box magazine
- Sights: Blade front, tangent leaf rear

The Bergmann–Bayard was a German-designed recoil operated semi-automatic pistol produced under license in Belgium.

== Design ==
=== Bergmann Mars ===
The Bergmann Mars was produced in 1901, and was the first Bergmann design aimed directly at the military market, with a comparatively powerful 9×23mm Bergmann round. It aroused the interest of a number of armies and was the subject of several trials in competition with the Mauser C96, Mannlicher, Browning and Luger pistols.

=== Model 1903 ===
The Bergmann–Bayard Model 1903 was adopted by the Spanish Army in 1905 as the Pistola Bergmann de 9 mm. modelo 1903.

=== Model 1908 ===
Unable to find a German manufacturer to complete the Spanish order for 3,000 pistols, Theodor Bergmann turned to a Belgian manufacturer, Anciens Etablissements Pieper (who used the trademark "Bayard") who completed the order. The modified pistol was known as the Bergmann Bayard 1908 (not to be confused with Pieper-Bayard 1908), or in Spain as the Pistola Bergmann de 9 mm. modelo 1908. Although adopted in 1908 delivery of the approximately 3,000 weapons was not completed until two years later. Meanwhile, other manufacturers such as Campo-Giro had adopted the 9mm Bergmann–Bayard round and, due to its long history of use in Spanish submachine guns, carbines and pistols, today it is most commonly known as the 9mm Largo.

=== Model 1910 and Model 1910/21 ===
At the same time, the Bergmann–Bayard model 1910 was adopted by the Danish military. A total of 4,840 M1910 Bergmann Bayards was initially delivered to the Danish Army. The pistol was produced in Belgium until 1914, when production ceased during World War I and never resumed. The Bergmann–Bayard was later produced in Denmark from 1922 to 1935.

Several modifications to the original design, such as an improved extractor and bolt; a screw to retain the sideplate instead of a spring-loaded catch; and a new grip design extending the full length of the backstrap to the frame were made. The original grips were made of Trolit, a checkered plastic material similar to Bakelite. It was, however, prone to chipping and warping, and the majority of new 1910/21 models was fitted with checkered wooden grips.

More than 2,200 Danish Bergmann–Bayard pistols were produced in Copenhagen. In addition, most of the prewar M1910s delivered to the Danish army by AEP were converted to meet the new specifications. These were restamped "M1910/21" beneath the Societe Anonyme Anciens Establissments Pieper on the left side of the barrel extension. The last Danish 1910/21 models were built in 1935, but they remained standard issue for the Danish military until 1946 when they were replaced by the Browning Hi-Power.

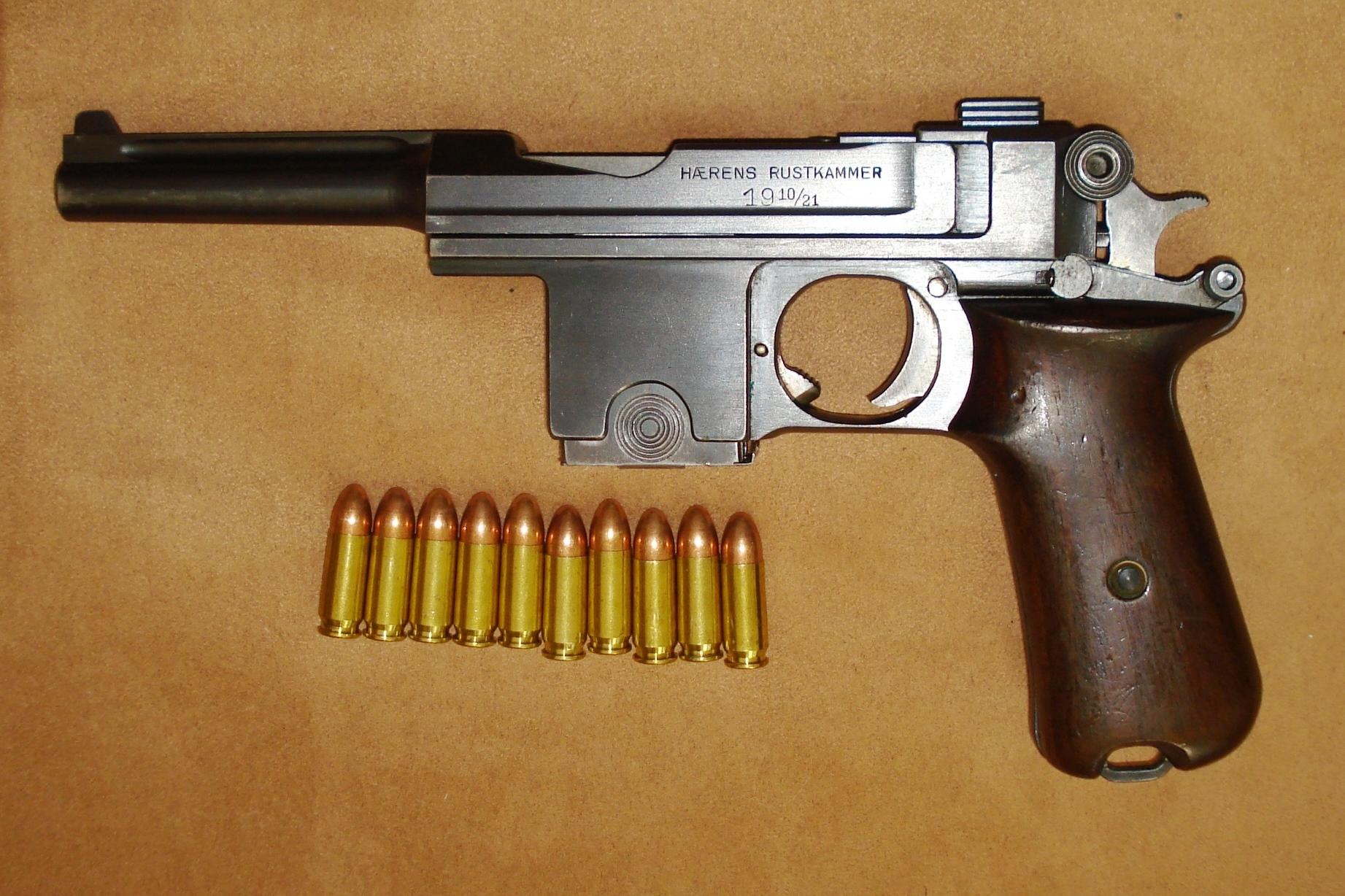
Danish 9 mm Bergmann M1910/21 pistol, left view

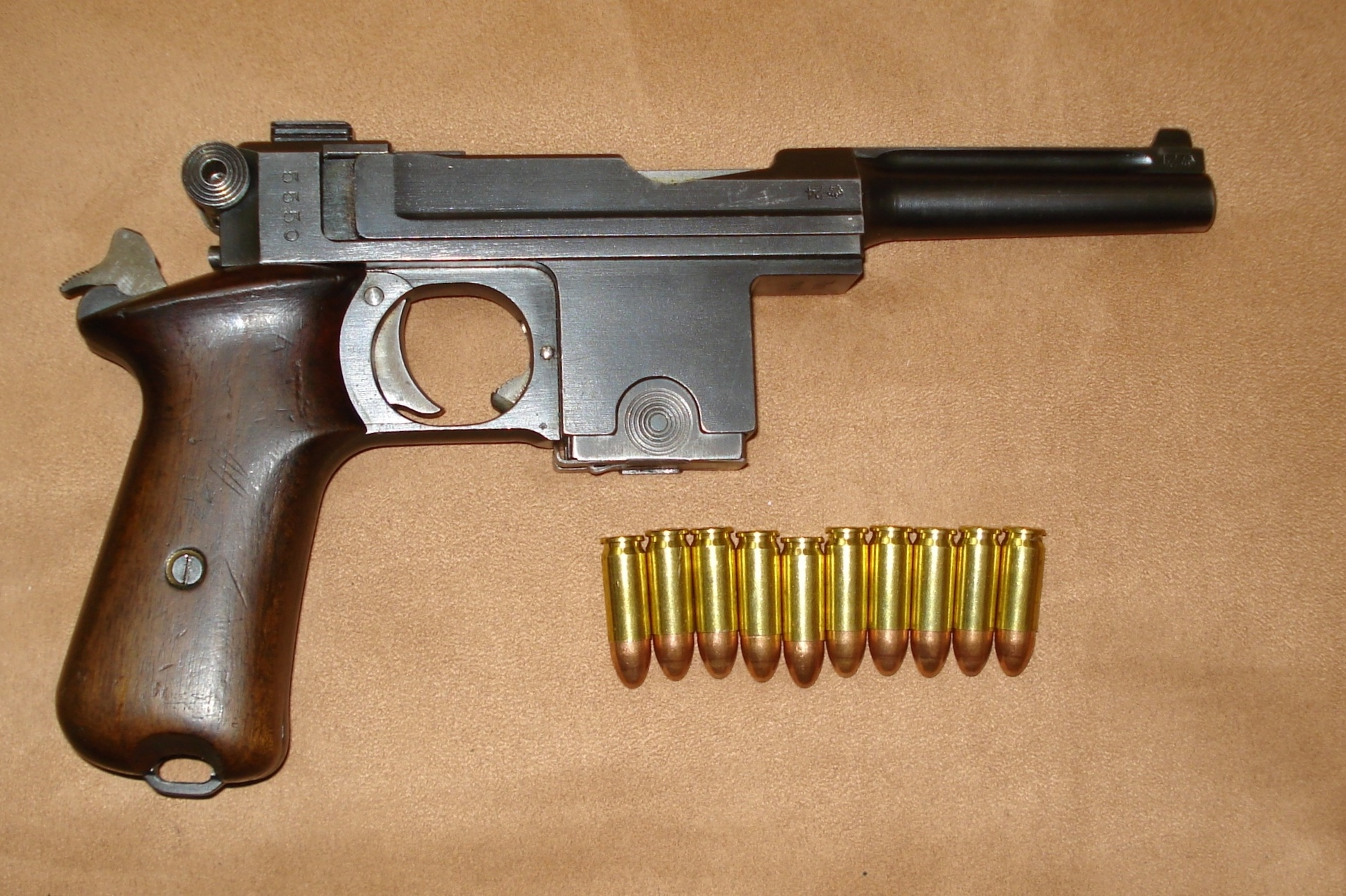
Danish 9 mm Bergmann M1910/21 pistol, right view

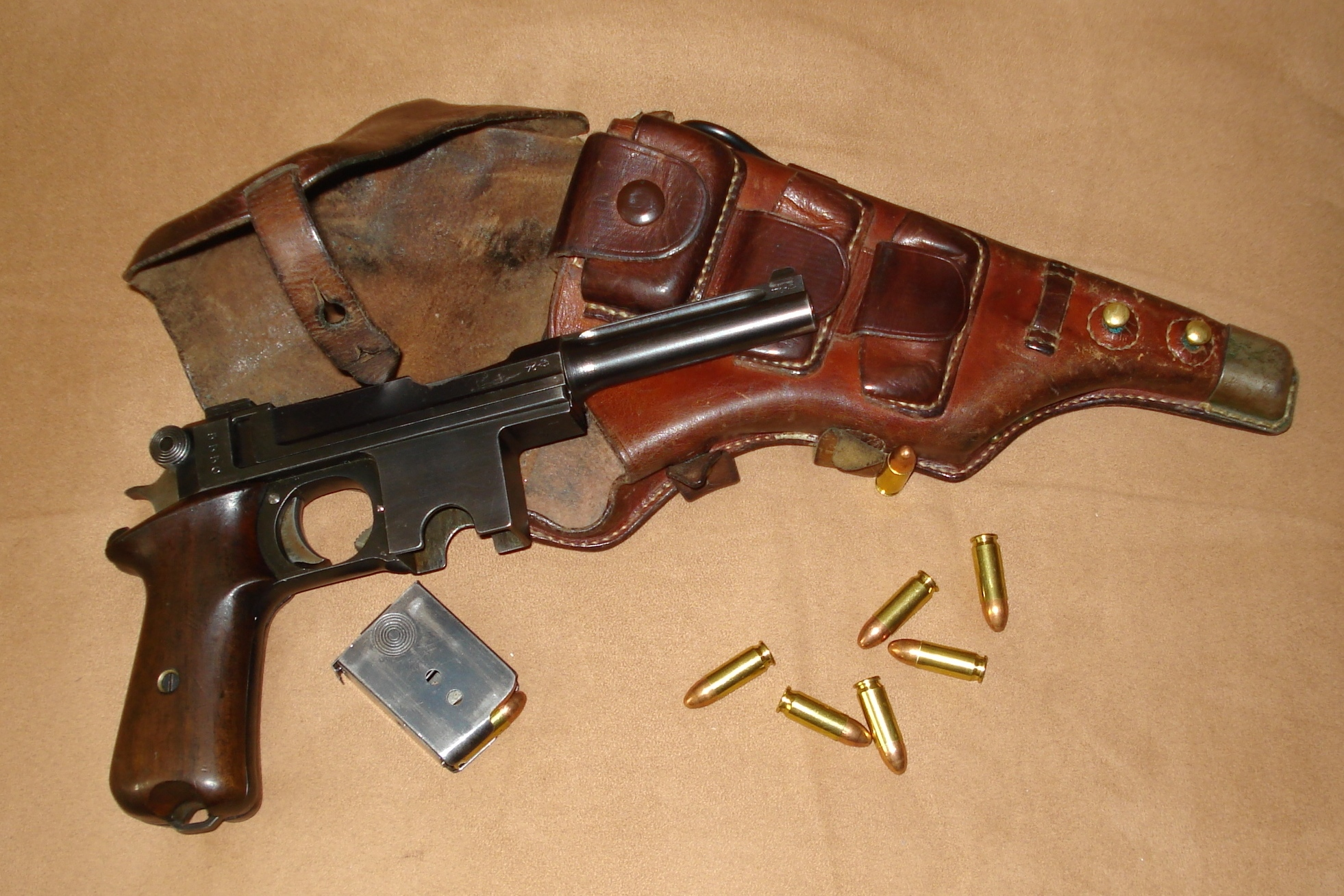
Danish 9 mm Bergmann M1910/21 pistol with military holster

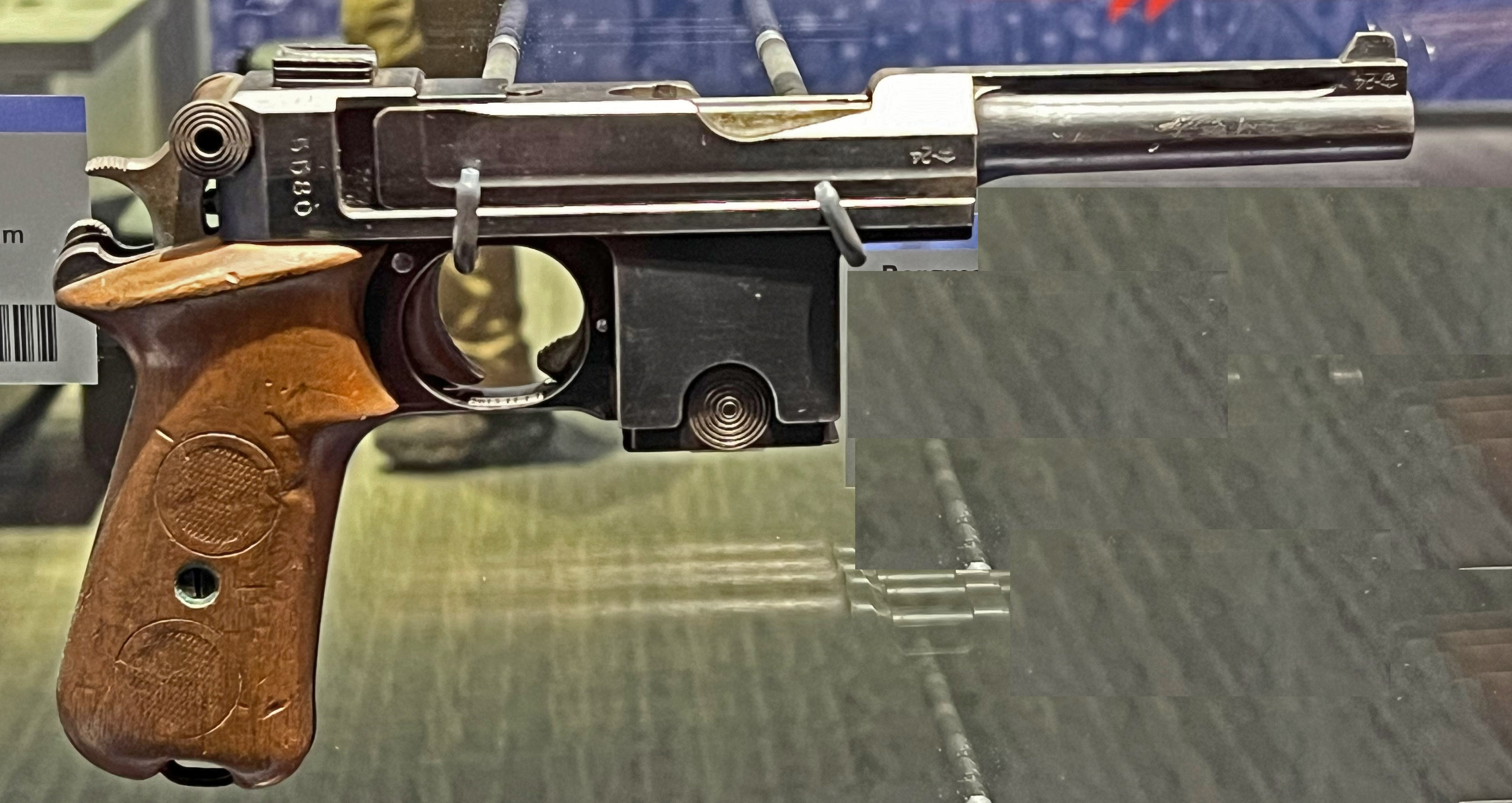
German Bergmann-Bayard Model 1910-21 pistol, 9mm, on display at the Cody Firearms Museum, Buffalo Bill Center of the West Cody, Wyoming.

== Other variants ==
German forces received between 1,000 and 2,000 modified Model 1910 pistols from the occupied AEP factory. Comparatively speaking these are very rare, and have distinctive wooden grips fitted and changed markings, but seem to have been mechanically identical.

Greece also adopted the pistol in 1913 (presumably the Model 1910), but no deliveries are believed to have taken place due to the outbreak of war.

Bergmann–Bayard pistols in .45 ACP were submitted for US army trials in 1907, but were unsuccessful.

== Users ==
- Denmark
- Finland - Supplied by Germany during the Finnish Civil War
- Greece
- Germany
- Spain

== See also ==
- Astra Model 900
- Mauser C96
