= Bergmann Mars =

Bergmann Model 1903 Mars
- Type: Semi-automatic pistol
- Place of origin: German Empire

Service history
- In service: 1905–1918
- Used by: Spain

Production history
- Designer: Theodor Bergmann
- Designed: 1901
- Manufacturer: V. C. Schilling; Anciens Etablissements Pieper
- Developed into: Bergmann-Bayard pistol
- Produced: 1905–1914

Specifications
- Cartridge: 9×23mm Largo
- Action: Short recoil
- Feed system: 6-round detachable box magazine

The Bergmann Mars, officially designated as the Model 1903 Mars, was Theodor Bergmann's first successful military pistol design, with the Spanish Army adopting it in 1905. The pistol is chambered for the 9×23mm Largo cartridge and features a locked breech based on a contemporary machine gun design also made by Bergmann.

== History ==
Theodor Bergmann after designing several blowback pistols for the commercial market, decided to combine his locked breech design for machine guns with the Model 1897 pistol to create a pistol marketed towards military customers as the Model 1903 Mars pistol chambered for the 9×23mm Bergmann cartridge, which was more powerful than the 9×19mm Parabellum loads used at the time.

In 1905, the Spanish Army tested the Mars and finding it a satisfactory design, decided to adopt it. But only a few pistols were delivered before Bergmann's subcontractor, the V. C. Schilling factory at Suhl was bought off by the Krieghoff company shortly after the Spanish contract was signed. With Krieghoff cancelling the subcontract with Bergmann, the latter decided to sell the patents and contract to the Anciens Etablissements Pieper in Herstal, and retire from the pistol business.

The Spanish ordered a total of 3,000 pistols, but only a handful of pistols were delivered by 1908. They were designated as the Pistola Bergmann de 9mm Modelo 1905. In 1908, the Spanish Army requested Pieper to make some modifications, including an improved safety mechanism. The new pistol was accepted by the Spanish Army as the Pistola Bergmann de 9mm Modelo 1908. It was declared obsolete and withdrawn from service shortly after the end of World War I, but its cartridge—known as the 9mm Largo by the Spanish—remained the standard pistol cartridge well into the late 1970s.

Other modifications, largely made to tailor the Bergmann design into Pieper's manufacturing methods included: slightly increase the length of the barrel, the grips made thicker, the barrel rifling changed from four grooves to six, and the barrel and barrel extension made into a single piece. These modified pistols were marketed as the Bergmann-Bayard, "Bayard" being the trade name used by Pieper. Production ceased in 1914 and was never resumed.

== Design ==
The Bergmann Mars is a modified Model 1897 No. 5 pistol with a locked breech also developed by Theodor Bergmann which was patented in 1901 and used on the Bergmann MG 15nA machine gun—a vertically-moving locking piece toward the rear of the bolt. When the bolt moves forward to lock the breech, the locking piece moves rides up through a ramp inside the frame towards a slot and pulling forward a metal extension until the locking piece enters a slot in the bottom of the barrel extension, tightly locking the bolt. This system is strong enough to withstand the pressure generated by the 9×23mm Largo cartridge.

The Mars uses a six-round detachable box magazine mounted in front of the trigger. A detachable shoulder stock-holster can also be fitted on the pistol.
