= MP 18 =

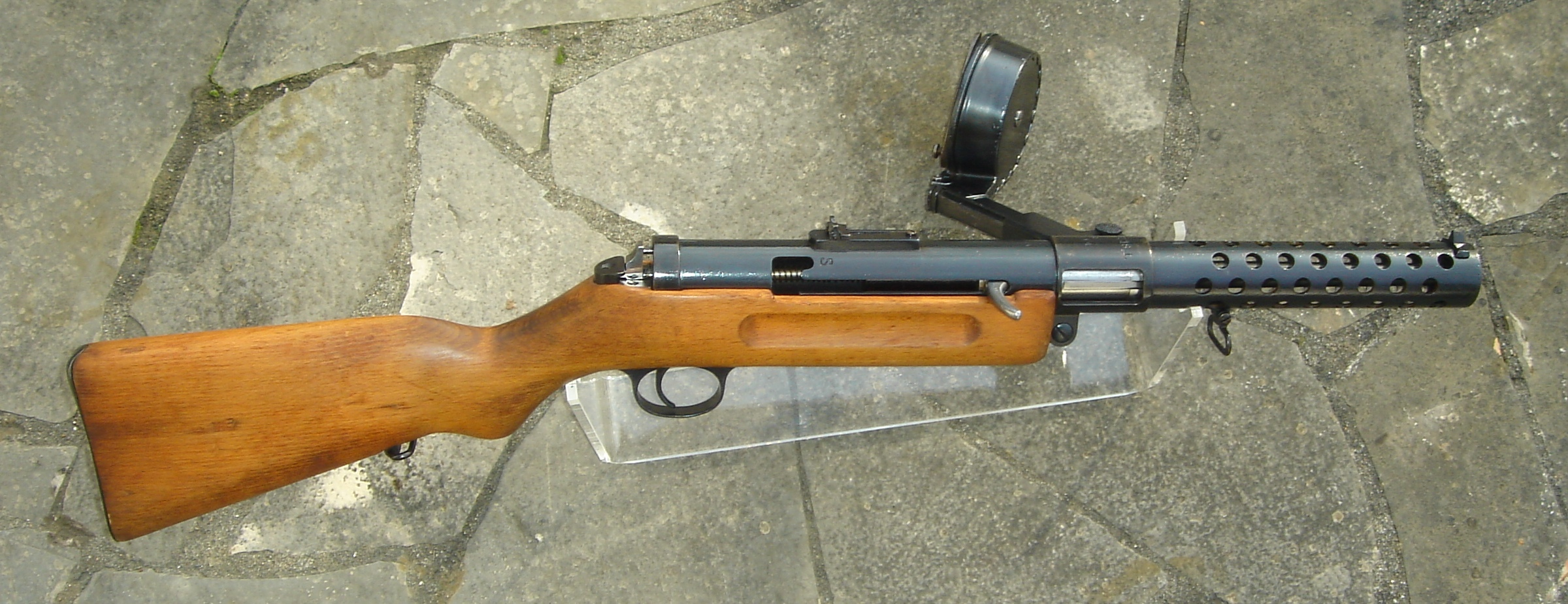
- Bergmann MP 18
- Type: Submachine gun
- Place of origin: German Empire

Service history
- In service: 1918–1945 (Germany)
- Used by: See Users
- Wars: World War I; Warlord Era; German Revolution; Greater Poland uprising (1918–1919); Irish Civil War; Rif War; 1924 Estonian coup d'état attempt; Chaco War; Spanish Civil War; Second Sino-Japanese War; Chinese Civil War; German-Czechoslovak War; World War II; Indonesian National Revolution; Iranian crisis of 1946; Ifni War

Production history
- Designer: Hugo Schmeisser
- Designed: 1917
- Manufacturer: Bergmann Waffenfabrik; C.G. Haenel (MP 28/II); Lindelof Konetehdas (Lindelof Submachinegun); Pieper (Mi 34); Qingdao Iron Works; SIG (SIG M1920)
- Produced: 1918–1919 (MP 18/|); 1920– 1927 (SIG 1920); 1928 – early 1940s (MP 28/II)
- No. built: ~ 37,000 (MP 18/|); ~ 5,000 (SIG 1920, not including chinese copies); 80,000 (MP 28/||)

Specifications
- Mass: 4.18 kg (9.2 lb); 4.0 kg (8.8 lb) (MP 28/II)
- Length: 832 mm (32.8 in)
- Barrel length: 200 mm (7.9 in)
- Cartridge: 9×19mm Parabellum; 7.63×25mm Mauser (export); 7.65×21mm Parabellum (export); 9x23mm Largo (export) (MP 28/II); 9x25mm Mauser (export) (MP 28/II); .45 ACP (export) (MP 28/II)
- Action: Open-bolt blowback
- Rate of fire: approx. 350–500 rounds/min (MP 18); 550–600 rounds/min (MP 28/II)
- Muzzle velocity: 380 m/s (1,247 ft/s)
- Feed system: 10-round Mauser pattern detachable box magazine (MP 18,III and MP 18,IV prototypes); 20-round detachable box magazine (prototypes, post WW1, MP 28/II); 30-round detachable box magazine (post WW1); 32-round detachable box magazine (MP 28/II); 32-round detachable TM 08 drum magazine (WW1); 36-round detachable box magazine (Spanish Avispero copy); 40-round Mauser pattern detachable box magazine (MP 18,III and MP 18,IV prototypes, SIG 1920); 50-round Mauser pattern detachable box magazine (MP 18,III and MP 18,IV prototypes, SIG 1920); 50-round magazine from Lanchester (MP 28/II)
- Sights: V-notch and front post

The MP 18 (Maschinen-Pistole 18) is a German submachine gun designed and manufactured by Bergmann Waffenfabrik. Introduced into service in mid-1918 by the German Army during World War I, the MP 18 was intended for use as a short-range weapon for trench warfare that would provide individual soldiers with increased firepower over a pistol.

Although MP 18 production ended after World War I, it was highly influential on subsequent small arms design; it formed the basis of most submachine guns manufactured during the first half of the 20th century.

== History ==
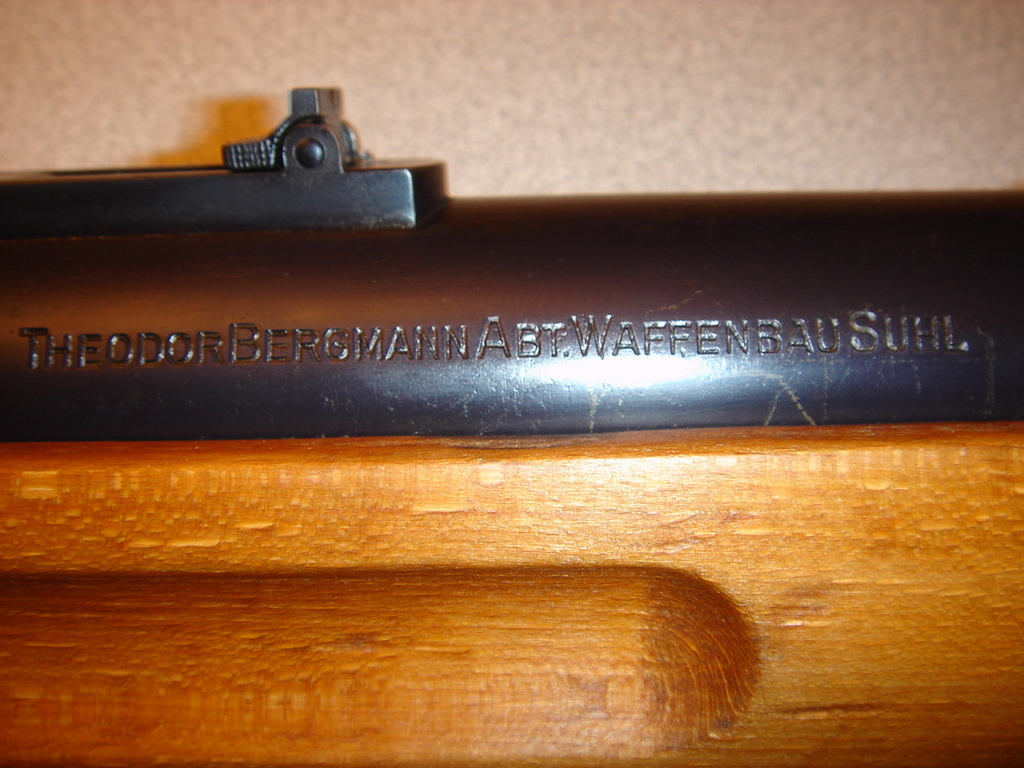
Theodor Bergmann trademark on an MP 18

What became known as the "submachine gun" had its genesis in the early 20th century and developed around the concepts of fire and movement and infiltration tactics, specifically for the task of clearing trenches of enemy soldiers, an environment within which engagements were unlikely to occur beyond a range of a few feet.

In 1915, the German Rifle Testing Commission at Spandau decided to develop a new weapon for trench warfare. An attempt to modify existing semi-automatic pistols (specifically the Luger and C96 Mauser) failed, as accurate aimed fire in full automatic mode was impossible due to their light weight and high rates of fire of 1,200 rounds per minute. The commission determined that a completely new kind of weapon was needed. Hugo Schmeisser, working for the Bergmann Waffenfabrik, was part of a team composed of Theodor Bergmann and a few other technicians. They designed a new type of weapon to fulfill the requirements, which was designated the Maschinenpistole 18/I. The I stands for the number 1. Four different versions of the MP 18 were evaluated by the German Army, known as the models I, II, III, and IV. They shared the same basic design but exhibited differences in the feed system.

The MP 18/I used the same Trommelmagazin drum as the artillery Luger. No details are available concerning the MP 18/II, however it is known that the MP 18/III and the MP 18/IV both fed from a straight, 90° magazine feed which took Mauser pattern box magazines, of the same type used in Mauser's experimental C06/08 pistol and C17 'Trench Carbine' (the latter was possibly a rival to the MP 18/I) and later the SIG Bergmann. Full-scale production began in early 1918.

The MP 18 is often credited as the very first submachine gun, as some sources discount the Villar Perosa, on account that it was originally fielded as a light support weapon on a mount. Whether the MP 18 was actually the first submachine gun is debated.

In October 1915 the Austro-Hungarian Standschützen-Battalionen trialed a submachine gun chambered in the 9x23mm Steyr cartridge, known as the Maschinengewehr Hellriegel. This was tested as both a support weapon fired from a prone position, and an assault weapon fired from the hip. In late 1916, the Military Aviation Corps of the Italian Army created the first official demand for a submachine gun when they requested the development of a single-barreled Villar Perosa with a detachable stock, which was made in early 1917 and later adopted as the Carabinetta Automatica OVP, with 500 being issued to observation crews. The designer of the Villar Perosa, Colonel Bethel-Abiel Revelli, had already conceived the principles of the submachine gun in September 1915, when he wrote that his gun could be converted to a single-barreled version that "may be mounted in the manner of a rifle so that it may be fired from the shoulder".

It remains a matter of controversy as to whether he made a weapon matching this description, but it is proven that the MP 18/I was merely one of many submachine gun concepts that were developed at the time, and that it cannot be referred to with any certainty as the first. The MP 18/I was the first mass-produced submachine gun to see extensive use in an infantry assault role in warfare.

=== World War I ===
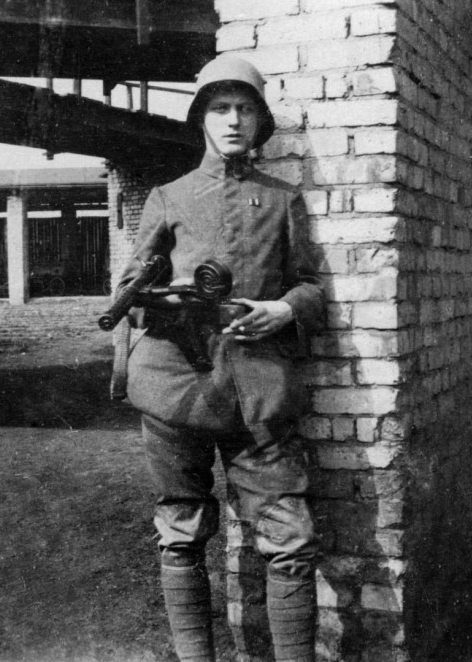
A German soldier or Freikorps volunteer armed with an MP 18

The MP 18 was introduced during the final stages of World War I in 1918. Contrary to popular belief, there is no concrete evidence that the MP 18/I reached the front lines in early 1918 or that submachine guns were employed by stormtroopers during the German spring offensive. Instead, the MP 18 was primarily fielded in the second half of 1918 as the war drew to a close. The first recorded unit to receive the MP 18/I was the 237th Infantry Brigade of the 119th Infantry Division, which consisted of the 46th and 58th Infantry Regiments, the 46th Reserve Infantry Regiment and the 119th Storm Division. The brigade received 216 MP 18/1 submachine guns for field trials in July 1918, after the spring offensive ended.

Shortly after reaching the front, the MP 18/I was used by German troops at the Battle of Amiens. Canadian soldiers of 13th Battalion (Royal Highlanders of Canada), CEF were photographed with a captured MP 18/I on 11 August. The total number of MP 18/Is manufactured during the war, and the number accepted by the German army, remains controversial. Major-general Ernst von Wrisberg, the director of the Prussian War Ministry, wrote shortly after the end of the war that some 17,000 guns had been delivered by October 1918. This estimate is backed up by military acceptance stamps reaching into the 17,000 serial mark. Existing serial numbers bear greater numbers, into the 30,000 range. One estimate, based on the serial numbers of surviving guns, is about 35,000 made during 1918 and possibly 1919. The vast majority were not actually accepted into service and likely remained in the factory until a new demand was created in the interwar years. According to a French report made after the war, the Germans produced 50,000 units in 1918, but only 8,000–10,000 were delivered.

The number that actually reached the front is probably lower. The best indicator is the serial number range of the examples captured by the Allies in the second half of 1918. All MP 18s that were captured were low serial numbers, typically in the hundreds, a reasonable estimate is that around 4,000 guns saw combat. The presence of an MP 18/I at the Sarsılmaz Museum in Düzce, Turkey, which is said to trace its provenance to the Turkish War of Independence, suggests the possibility that some MP 18s were supplied to the Ottoman Empire at the end of the First World War.

=== Treaty of Versailles ===
A common claim is that the gun proved so effective that it was banned by the Treaty of Versailles. Restrictions are laid out in Tables No. II & No. III of the treaty which gives the number of rifles, carbines, heavy machine guns, and light machine guns. A clause that appears in some copies reads "Automatic rifles and carbines are to be counted as light machine guns". This does not constitute a ban, but a restriction to 1,134 guns. The number is so low that it would have stunted the German Army's distribution of weapons of this type, but it does not say the MP 18/I would be banned. There is nothing in the treaty that says that Germany was not allowed to manufacture submachine guns.

=== Post-war service ===
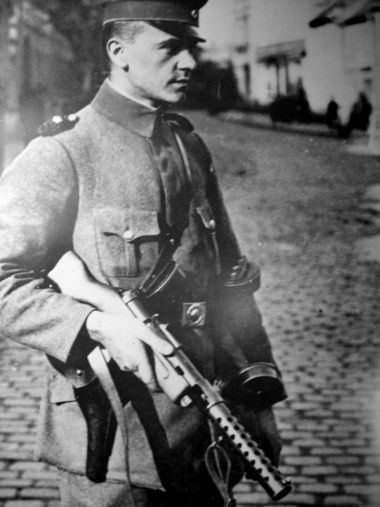
A policeman in Eisleben armed with an MP 18, 1921

The MP 18 proved to be an excellent weapon. Its concept was well-proven in trench fighting. The basic design directly influenced later submachine gun designs and showed its superiority over the regular infantry rifle in urban, mobile, and guerrilla warfare. One of the most notable post-war users of the MP 18/I were the Freikorps who armed themselves with weapons appropriated from military depots. After the armistice, Germany found itself embroiled with domestic strife in the form of the Spartacist uprising. Many submachine guns that had not been sent to the front were issued to Freikorps volunteers; the government collaborated closely with the Freikorps to crush the uprising and initially did little to stop these guns from falling into paramilitary hands. The MP 18/I proved to be particularly popular among these irregular forces.

The MP 18/I was gradually retired from military service and allocated to police forces, particularly the Sicherheitspolizei. The government's implementation of the Treaty of Versailles in 1924 approved the distribution of maschinenpistole by the Ordnungspolizei (uniformed police, though probably meaning the SiPo), provided that they were not issued at a rate any higher than one gun for every twenty men. These weapons were stamped "1920" to signify that they had been approved for government issue. These guns were in legal possession of the state, but many more of the c. 50,000 guns that had been produced fell into the hands of unofficial paramilitaries or criminal elements. In 1922 Foreign Minister Walther Rathenau was assassinated by ultranationalists armed with a stolen MP 18/I.

During the failed 1924 Estonian coup d'état attempt, the MP 18 was used to defend the Tallinn barracks from Communist militants; some of whom were armed with Thompson submachine guns. This was possibly the first engagement where submachine guns were used on both sides.

All the limited conflicts between 1920 and 1940 saw an increasing use of this new class of weapons, first in South America during the Chaco War, then in Europe during the Spanish Civil War, and in China during the Warlord Era and the Second Sino-Japanese War, where its use by well-trained Chinese troops was costly for the invaders as in the Battle of Shanghai. It was also used during World War II by various partisans and resistance forces.

From the MP 28,II, a variant of the MP 18/I was born, which is sometimes called the 'MP 18/Iv' ( 'v' supposedly standing for 'verbessert' or 'improved'). The guns themselves are marked 'M.P.18,I SYSTEM SCHMEISSER'. The so-called MP 18/Iv was a conversion of the MP 18/I from a 45° Trommelmagazin feed to a 90° Schmeisser box magazine feed. These conversions were carried out at C.G. Haenel on the request of German police forces. It is commonly assumed that the conversions were undertaken from 1920 onward, predating the MP 28,II. This derives from confusion over the '1920' property stamps that were added after the Treaty of Versailles. In fact, the conversions were not undertaken until the 1930s. It was merely a cheap and economical way for the German police to update their existing stocks of submachine guns to feed from the new Schmeisser box magazine without having to purchase entirely new orders of MP 28,IIs.

Old stocks of MP 18/I submachine guns were distributed as foreign aid to allies of the Third Reich in neighboring countries. These predominantly fell into the hands of fascist groups in France, Austria, and Czechoslovakia. In France, deliveries of the MP 18/I, MP 28,II, and MP 35/I submachine guns were made to the far-right nationalist organization La Cagoule. Several arms dumps were discovered by the French police and destroyed prior to the Second World War.

MP 18/I and MP 28,II submachine guns were distributed to the Austrian SS during their exile from their home country. The Austrian Nazi Party was banned after their attempted coup in 1934 and many members of the militant wing of the party went to Germany to receive training by the SS. The intent was to send these militants back to Austria, but a second coup never materialized.

In Czechoslovakia, police confiscated several MP 18/Is that had been smuggled into the country by the SS to arm Henleinist sabotage squads. Some of these guns saw use during the Sudeten Uprising of 1938. These weapons were sourced from old military stocks and still had their original feed systems taking the TM 08 Trommelmagazin. Bergmann MP 35/Is were also supplied to the Henleinists.

The MP 18 remained in limited service with the German armed forces during the Second World War, specifically with the Sicherheitsdienst, later eastern foreign divisions of the Waffen SS and also with Kriegsmarine coastal artillery units.

=== Evolution ===
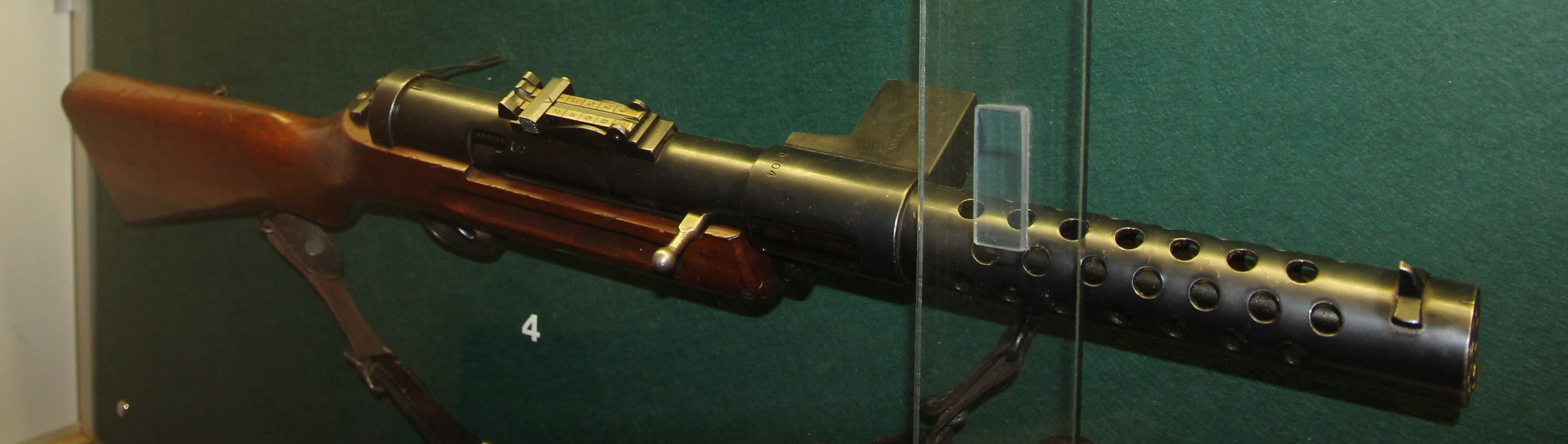
SIG Bergmann in the Infantry Museum, Mikkeli, Finland.

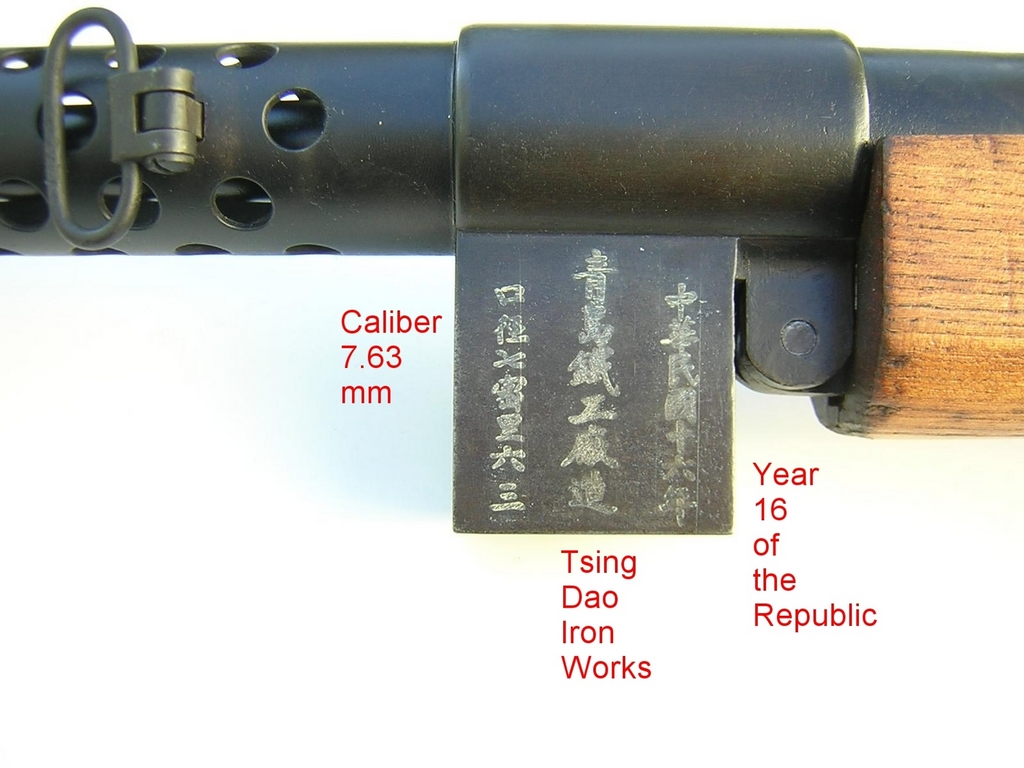
SIG 1920 copy made in Tsing Tao, China, 1927

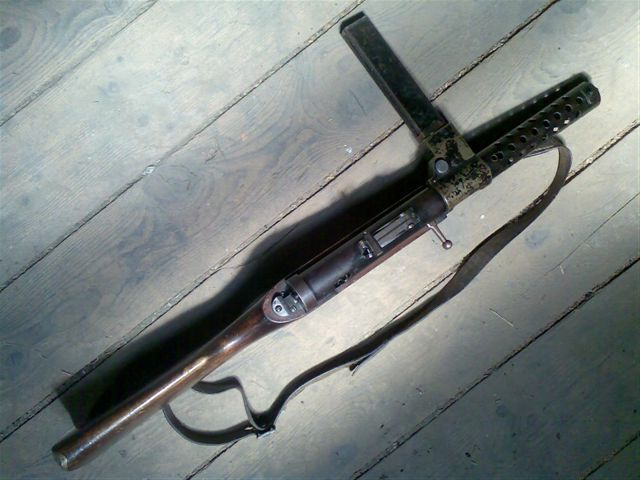
Early model MP 28 sold by Pieper

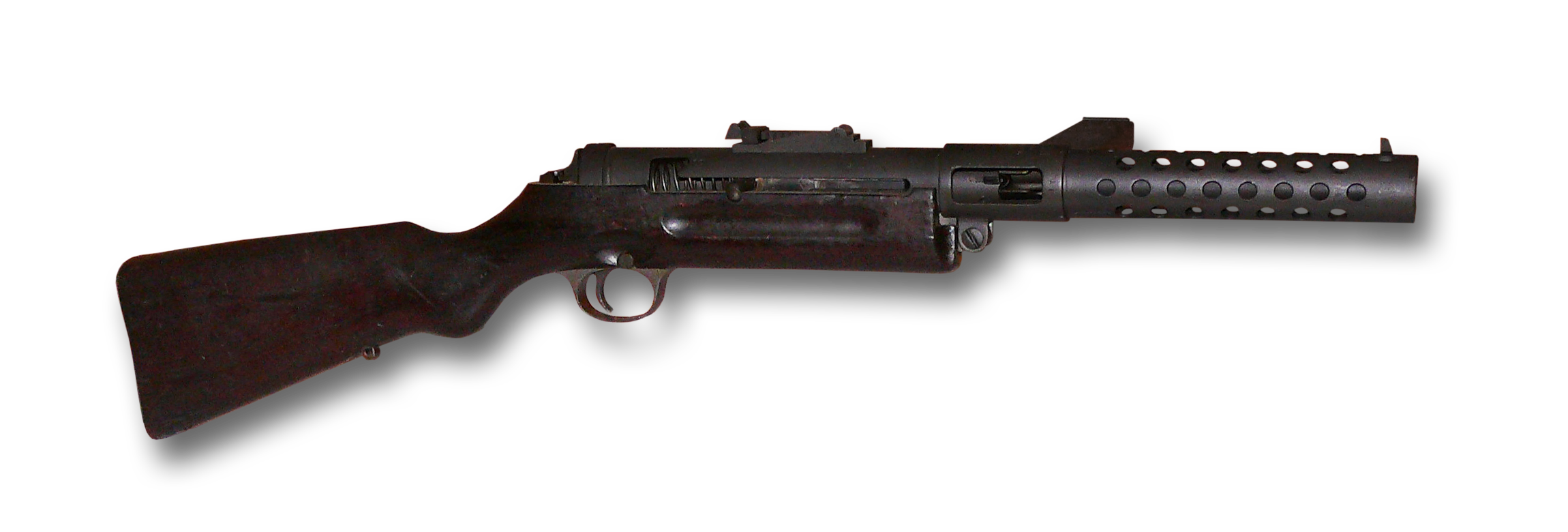
Side of an MP 28 in Yoav Fortress, which was named after Operation Yoav

Bergmann sold the license of the MP 18. 1 to SIG Switzerland; the Swiss made model was known as the SIG Bergmann 1920. It existed in .30 Luger and 7.63 mm Mauser. The Bergmann MP 18.1 represents a milestone both in terms of armament technology and warfare tactics. It opened the way for a whole new class of weapons and triggered the research for lighter automatic firearms to be used by mobile troops. Its first direct competitors did not see service in World War I, but most of them saw use in all the limited conflicts taking place in the inter-war period.

China produced many copies of the SIG Bergmann at various factories, including the arsenals at Tsing Tao, Dagu, and Hanyang. The production was decentralized, and each factory's version exhibited differences from one another; the guns produced at Tsing Tao and Dagu had a bottom-mounted magazine. Large numbers of the Tsing Tao submachine gun were made, and use by Chinese Republican troops from the mid-1920s to the 1940s.

During the 1920s Chicago gun dealer Vincent Daniels imported 7.65mm SIG Bergmann submachine guns and installed a two-position fire-selector behind the end cap of the receiver. This arrangement was somewhat similar to the later Lanchester submachine gun. The guns were sold under the name "Daniels Rapid-Fire Carbine" and were bought by members of the Northside Gang and the Chicago Outfit.

Between 1927 and 1930 Estonia produced the Arsenal M23 submachine gun; a weapon based on the SIG Bergmann that used the 9mm Browning Long cartridge.

In Germany, Hugo Schmeisser continued his work on submachine guns at C.G. Haenel. This work was undertaken independently of Theodor Bergmann or SIG. Around the mid-1920s, Schmeisser built a series of prototypes – possibly no more than ten – known as the MP Schmeisser. These were essentially no different from the MP 18,III MP 18,IV or the SIG Bergmann), except for the addition of a fire selector above the trigger group, which took the form of a push-in button which, when depressed, would produce only single shots. This was an improvement over the MP 18, which had no semi-automatic function. The magazine housings of these guns were stamped 'M.P. Schmeisser I.' It is occasionally claimed that the design of the MP Schmeisser was undertaken in secrecy, though this is questionable as a surviving prototype is marked with the Haenel factory stamp and Schmeisser was photographed holding the weapon. The gun was reportedly tested by the Reichswehr in 1925, along with a design by Heinrich Vollmer known as the VMP. These trials yielded no decision and there was only limited interest in submachine guns from the Reichswehr at that time.

An improved version of the MP Schmeisser appeared in the late 1920s. This was called the 'MP Schmeisser Mod. 28/II'. The suffix indicates that this was the second iteration after the earlier 'I' prototype. The fire selector was retained but many additional improvements were also made in the magazine feed and recoil spring. This was the first model Schmeisser to abandon the Trommelmagazin and Mauser pattern magazines in favour of a new magazine of Schmeisser's own design. The Schmeisser magazine was double stack but had a single-position feed opening. The feed lips were reinforced with a strengthened bracket which was intended to prevent the deformation of the magazine opening (a common problem with the Mauser magazines). However this change to a single-position feed resulted in a far less reliable feed.

The MP Schmeisser was not adopted by the Reichswehr; export sales were Haenel's main source of interest in this weapon. Prior to the Nazi regime, Germany was still subject to export restrictions. Haenel came into an arrangement with two foreign companies, Pieper in Belgium and Veland in the Netherlands. Pieper served as the "manufacturer" of these early model MP Schmeissers, which were distinguishable by their rounded charging handle. Some of these early guns were "sanitized", with no markings on the magazine housing except for a serial number, and occasionally they were fitted with a bayonet mount that screwed onto the ventilation holes of the barrel jacket. Later, the marking "ANCIENS ETABLISSMENTS PIEPER S.A. HERSTAL" was added, in addition to proofing stamps by Woit Nicolas Cominoto. Pieper did not actually manufacture any of these guns: all of these ''Belgian-made' Schmeissers were made at Haenel and the parts were sent to Pieper for assembly. After the outbreak of the Second World War, the French military placed a command for 1,000 Peiper-made guns, adopted under the name Pistolet Mitrailleur Pieper Modèle 1934, along with 1.6 million rounds of 9 mm ammunition. The delivery of 300 weapons was confirmed on 1 February 1940.

By 1933, with the Nazis gaining power and the Inter-Allied Commission of Control no longer enforcing the Versailles restrictions, Haenel was free to openly manufacture the MP Schmeisser. These guns were now stamped 'M.P.28,II', giving rise to the common name of this gun: the MP 28. Export sales of the MP 28,II were made to many countries. The MP28 was copied by the Second Spanish Republic under the codename Avispero. The Avispero was chambered in 9mm Largo and had a 36-round magazine.

The French immediately launched studies based on captured MP 18s. In 1921, the Section Technique de l'Artillerie (S.T.A.) was asked to develop a prototype for the country's first submachine gun. It is often said that the weapon copied the M.P.18,I, it maybe also be derived from the French Ribeyrolles automatic carbine and the Italian Revelli-Beretta carbine. The S.T.A., did not chamber a French cartridge but instead used 9×19mm Parabellum. After trials in 1924, it was adopted on the 11 August 1925 as the Pistolet Mitrailleur Modèle 1924. The role of a light support weapon was already filled by machine guns, and with the end of World War I, there was no immediate requirement for an assault weapon. The only use the Army could ultimately find for the S.T.A. was to arm personnel whose job did not require a rifle. The S.T.A. saw limited use in the Moroccan Rif War, but these issues led to the Army cancelling the 8,000-gun order in 1928 after only 1,000 had been delivered. The S.T.A. was retired by the early 1930s. It has been said that some S.T.A. submachine guns (As well as captured MP 18s) were used during the defence of France in 1940, probably in very small numbers.

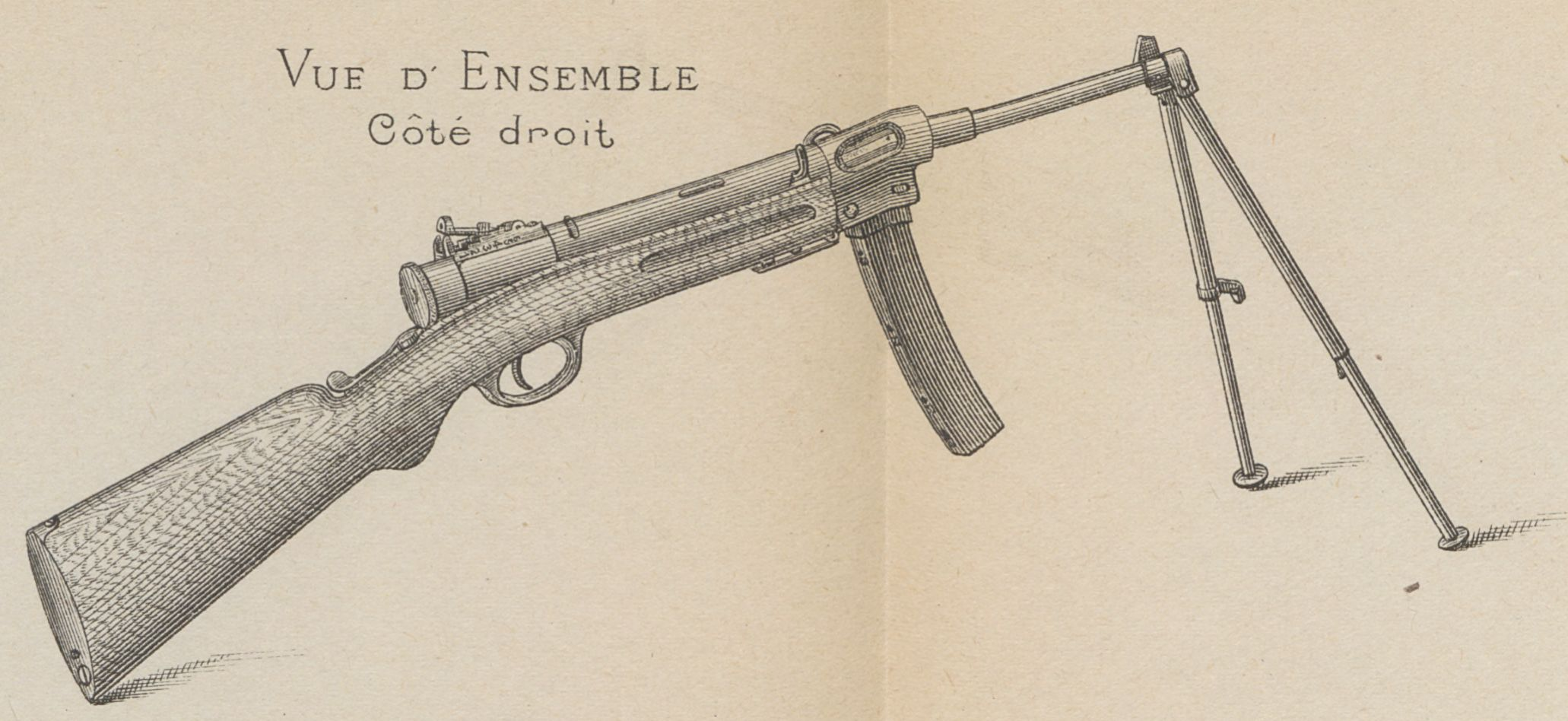
A French-made STA Modèle 1924

The Austrian Steyr MP 34 was created by a team of technicians led by Louis Stange who designed a submachine gun for Rheinmetall in 1919 and used Bergmann's MG 15 to design the MG 30. The SIG Bergmann 1920 was used by Finland, Japan, and Estonia and was the inspiration for the Estonian Tallinn 1923, the Japanese Type 100 submachine gun and the Finnish Suomi model 31, which in turn inspired Degtyarev for his PPD 34.

Emil Bergmann, Theodor Bergmann's son, designed the MP 32 that evolved into the MP 34 as adopted by Denmark before receiving the MP35 name when adopted by nascent Wehrmacht in 1935. This submachine gun is often mistaken for the Mitraillette 34, an MP 28 made in Belgium by Pieper Bayard, former Bergmann licensed manufacturer or with the MP34 made by Steyr. It is easy to identify the Bergmann MP 32/34/35 or its final version 35/1 since the cocking lever works exactly like a rifle bolt.

In 1940, with a pressing need for individual automatic weapons, the British copied the MP 28 and developed the Lanchester submachine gun for the Royal Navy. Solidly built with the use of brass for the magazine well, and a bayonet mount, it entered service in 1940. The magazine and the bolt of the MP 28 could be used in the Lanchester. The British Sten used the side-mounted magazine configuration and a simplified version of the open-bolt firing operating system of the MP 28.

The OVP 1918, an offspring of Revelli's Villar Perosa 1915, inspired Heinrich Vollmer for his telescopic bolt used in the VPM 1930, EMP, MP 38, MP 40 and MP 41.

The Soviet Union made a similar use of MP 28 design in their PDD-34 sub machine gun in 1934. Further development of the PPD-34 led to the simplified PPD-40 and PPSh-41.

== Design details ==
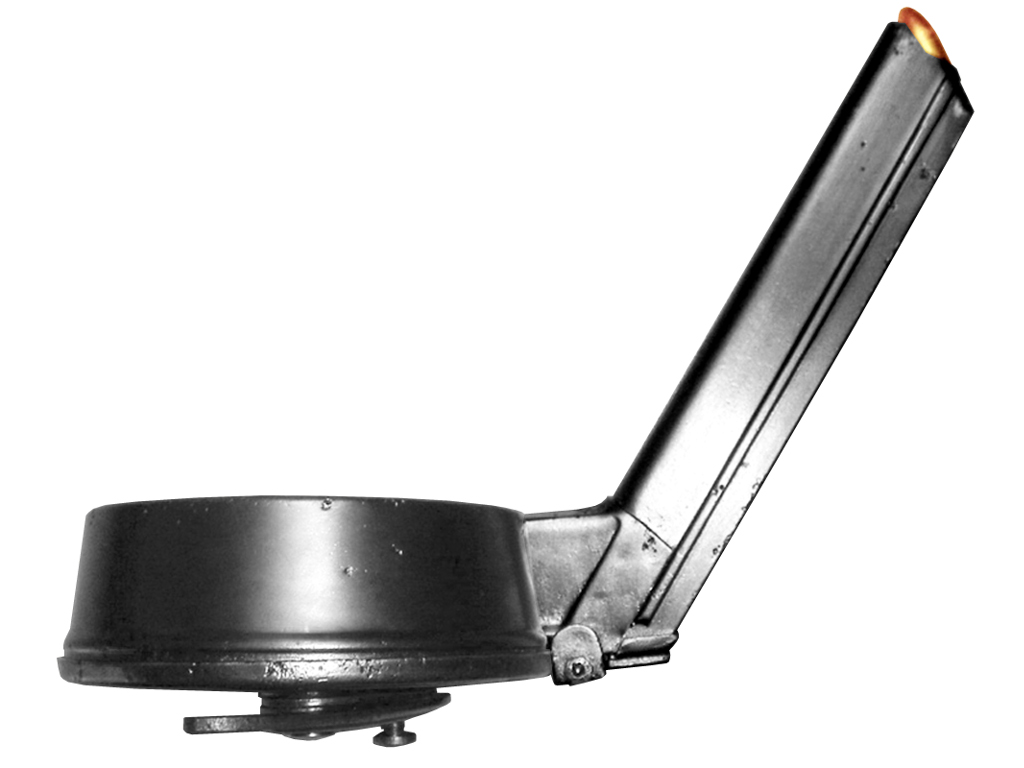
TM 08 magazine for Bergmann MP 18.1

The MP 18 was a heavy weapon, weighing over 5 kg (11.0 lb) when fully loaded. The receiver tube was very thick (around 3 mm), compared with later World War II submachine guns with half that thickness or less, such as the Sten gun or MP 40.

Though Schmeisser designed a conventional 20-round-capacity "box" magazine for the weapon, the testing commission, for practical reasons, insisted that the MP 18 be adapted to use the 32-round TM 08 Luger "snail" drum magazine that was widely used with the long-barreled version of the Luger pistol.

Like many other open-bolt designs, the MP 18 was prone to accidental discharge. If the buttstock of a loaded gun was given a hard knock while the bolt was fully forward, the gun could accidentally fire because of the bolt overcoming the action spring resistance and moving rearward enough to pick up a round, chamber it and fire. Soldiers liked to leave the bolt of their firearm in this closed or forward position, so dirt and debris would not enter the barrel and chamber. This "bolt-closure" practice acted as a dust cover for the weapon's chamber, preventing a malfunction from occurring because of the presence of debris, but making accidental discharge more likely.

The German police asked for external safeties on their MP 18s, and universal bolt-locking safeties were added on all the submachine guns used by the police. Later submachine gun designs like the Sten and the MP 40 were modified to allow the cocking handle to be pushed inwards to lock the closed bolt to the tubular receiver casing. This design change prevented accidental discharges when the bolt was left forward and a loaded magazine was inserted.

== Operation ==
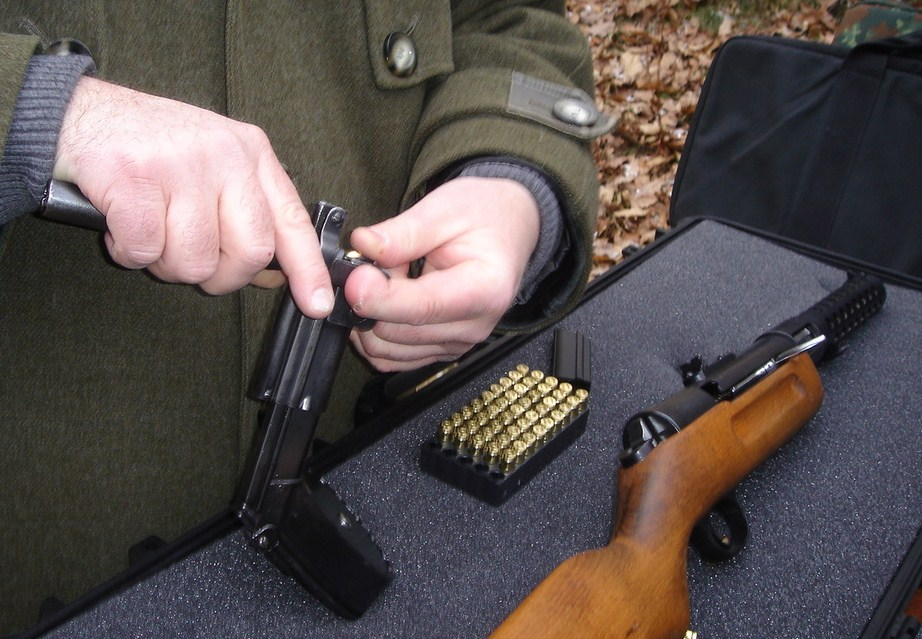
Loading a TM 08

The MP 18 submachine gun is a simple blowback operated weapon firing from the open bolt. The original MP 18.1 was designed to use the snail drum magazine of the Luger Artillery model pistol. This rotary design type of magazine holds 32 rounds of 9 mm Parabellum, the user having to load the magazine with a proprietary loading tool. A special sleeve was required when the snail drum was used on the MP 18 to stop the snail drum from being inserted too far in the magazine well.

After 1920, the MP 18 was modified to use a straight magazine similar to those used in the later developed MP 40 submachine gun. The MP 18 could only fire in the fully automatic mode. Its successor, the MP 28/2, received a modified mechanism with a selector for single shot or fully automatic fire.

== Users ==
- Belgium: MP 28 assembled under license at Pieper, later adopted as Mi 34 Schmeisser-Bayard (Pistolet Mitrailleur Modèle 1934)
- Bolivia: MP 18, MP 28, SIG Bergmann
- Brazil: Various police agencies adopted the MP 28 in 7.63×25mm and 9×19mm; alongside SIG Bergmanns in 7.63×25mm. The São Paulo police adopted the MP 28 in 7.63×25mm in 1934; these weapons were issued 50 round magazines and were still in use in the late 1970s. The Pernambuco police seized 25 Bergmanns from the Lundgren Brothers in 1931 and put them into service, a SIG Bergmann with a 50-round magazine was borrowed by Lieutenant João Bezerra of the Alagoas police and used in the 1938 Angico Raid where Lampião was killed Around 8 Bergmmans were purchased for the Special Police in the Federal District. Each of its four shock detachments was armed with two Bergmanns, two Suomi KP31s, and two Thompsons
- Bulgaria In 1939 20 MP-18/1, and 70 MP-28/2 submachine guns were in used with the police, A further 300 MP28/2s were ordered during WW2
- Canada: Some evidence that captured MP 18s in use with Alberta Provincial Police
- China: Imported and local-made copies of the Swiss-made SIG Bergmann in 7.63×25mm Mauser
- Estonia: The MP18 was used to defend the Tallinn barracks during the 1924 communist uprising. An unknown number of SIG Bergmanns were purchased. Estonian police purchased an unknown amount of guns from the Finnish Lindelöf factory
- Finland: 1,523 SIG M/20s in 7.65×21mm Luger were bought between 1922 and 1940 During the Winter War, 171 MP-28s were bought from Belgium; but they did not arrive in time. These guns were later issued in the Continuation War to units in Lapland, home front troops and supply corps. The Leonard Lindelöf company started to manufacture licensed copies of the M/20 in 1922 it is estimated 60 or 70 guns were made in total; those were of inferior quality and the magazines were not interchangeable. The production suffered multiple delays, in 1925 the first guns were completed and small amounts were sold to police, coastal guard, local civil guard organizations and customs. 12 were acquired by the civil guard in 1932 as a pledge from a failed contract.
- France: After WW1 a small amount was surrendered by Germany; they were still in inventory in 1939. In 1940 at least 300 MP 28/IIs assembled by the Belgian firm Pieper were received, out of an order for 1,000 weapons. These were adopted under the name Pistolet Mitrailleur Pieper Mle 1934.
- Germany:
  - German Empire
  - Weimar Republic: Used by the police after WWI.
  - Nazi Germany
- Indonesia: Ex-Japanese Swiss-made guns. Captured MP28s were used during the Indonesian National Revolution
- Imperial State of Iran: The MP28 was purchased before WW2 and used during the Iran crisis of 1946.
- Empire of Japan: SIG Bergmann in 7.63×25mm Mauser adopted by the navy; 125 were ordered in 1922 and 320 in 1929. These weapons were fitted with the Type 30 bayonet and issued to Japanese Marines in China. SIG Bergmanns were also captured from Chinese forces. MP28 bought for trials
- Latvia: Approx. 6 Bergmann MP 18s in the stock of the Latvian Army by April 1936
- Malaya
- Manchukuo: Adopted locally made Chinese copies of the SIG Bergmann
- Netherlands: MP 28 adopted by KNIL
- Norway: The Assault Group of the Norwegian Police Service acquired 26 SIG Bergmann submachine guns in 1937
- Paraguay: Purchased a few MP 28s before the Chaco War, later captured more from Bolivian forces SIG Bergmannns captured from Bolivia
- Poland: MP 28 obtained for trials, possibly issued to presidential guard and police forces
- Portugal: Pistola metralhadora Bergmann in 7.65mm, likely SIG Bergmann. Issued to the army and public security police in 1929, under the designation m/929.
- Romania: Small numbers of MP 18 and MP 28 submachine guns adopted by police units in the interwar years. Several thousand MP 28 submachine guns were supplied to the Iron Guard by the Sicherheitsdienst, used by the army after the Iron Guard Rebellion
- Slovak Republic (1939–1945): Used by Reinsurance division (Security division) in Belorussia and Ukraine against pro-Soviet partisans
- South Korea: Korean Liberation Army used in Second Sino-Japanese War received by National Revolutionary Army
- Spanish Republic: Multiple batches of MP28s bought for trials; mass-produced a copy of the MP 28 known as the 'Avispero' during the Spanish Civil War. 167 MP 18s were acquired from SEPEWE in October 1936
- Spanish State: Captured Republican-made MP 28 'Avispero' guns pressed into service after the Civil War Those weapons were retired from the regular army in the 1950s; but remained in use with colonial troops until the 1960s. Issued to native police during the Ifni War
- Switzerland: 25 SIG Bergmanns in 7.65mm were trialed by the army, but were not adopted. The Zurich police adopted the SIG Bergmann in 9mm Parabellum.
- Thailand: The SIG Bergmann in 7.65 Parabellum was adopted by police. It was also used for executions until the 1980s, when it was replaced by the MP5SD
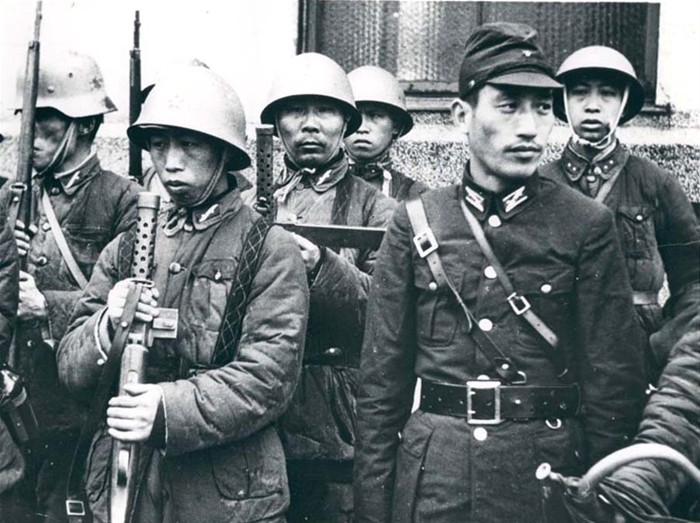
Soldiers of the Collaborationist Chinese Army with SIG Bergmanns

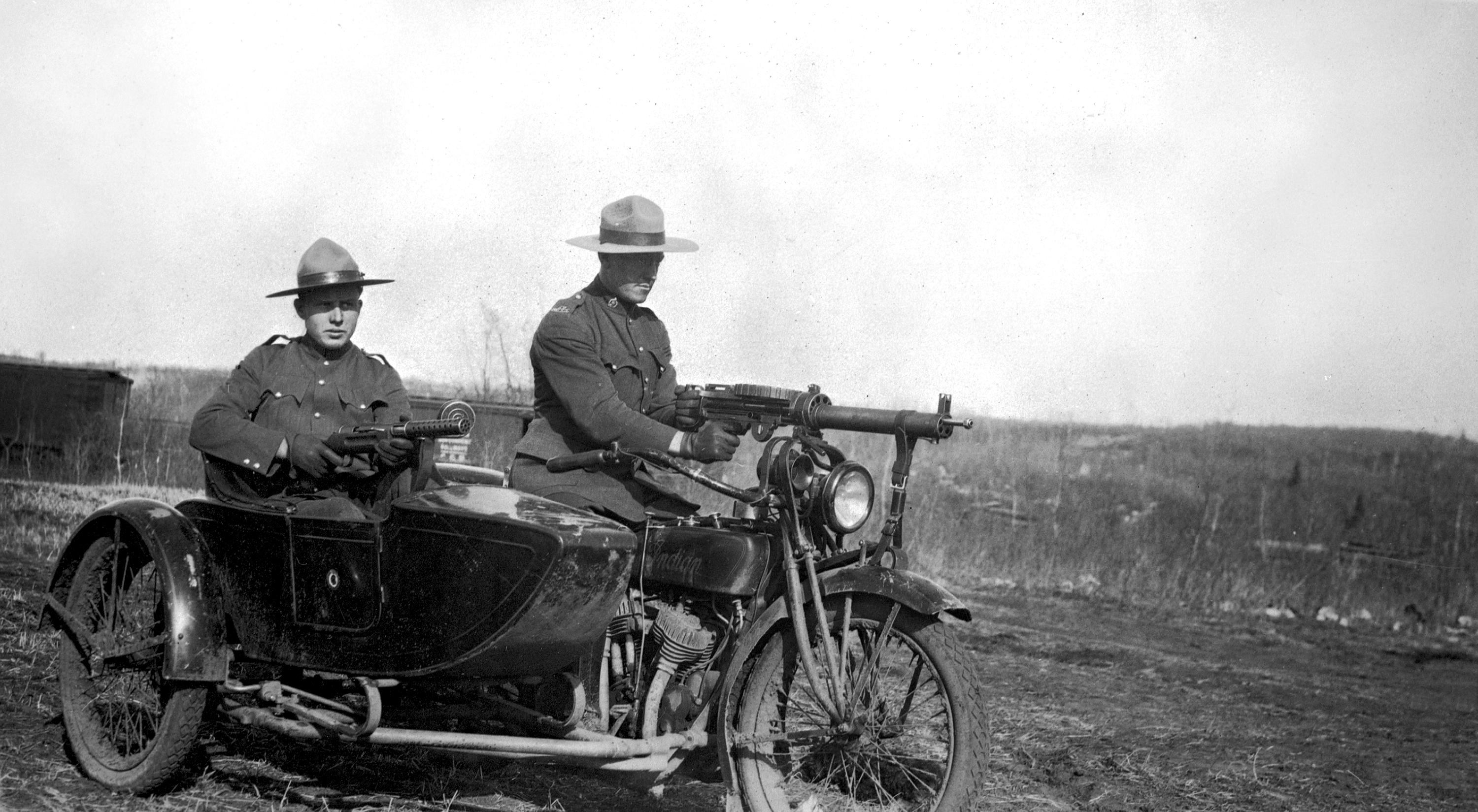
Members of the Alberta Provincial Police in Canada with an MP 18 and Lewis gun (1920s)

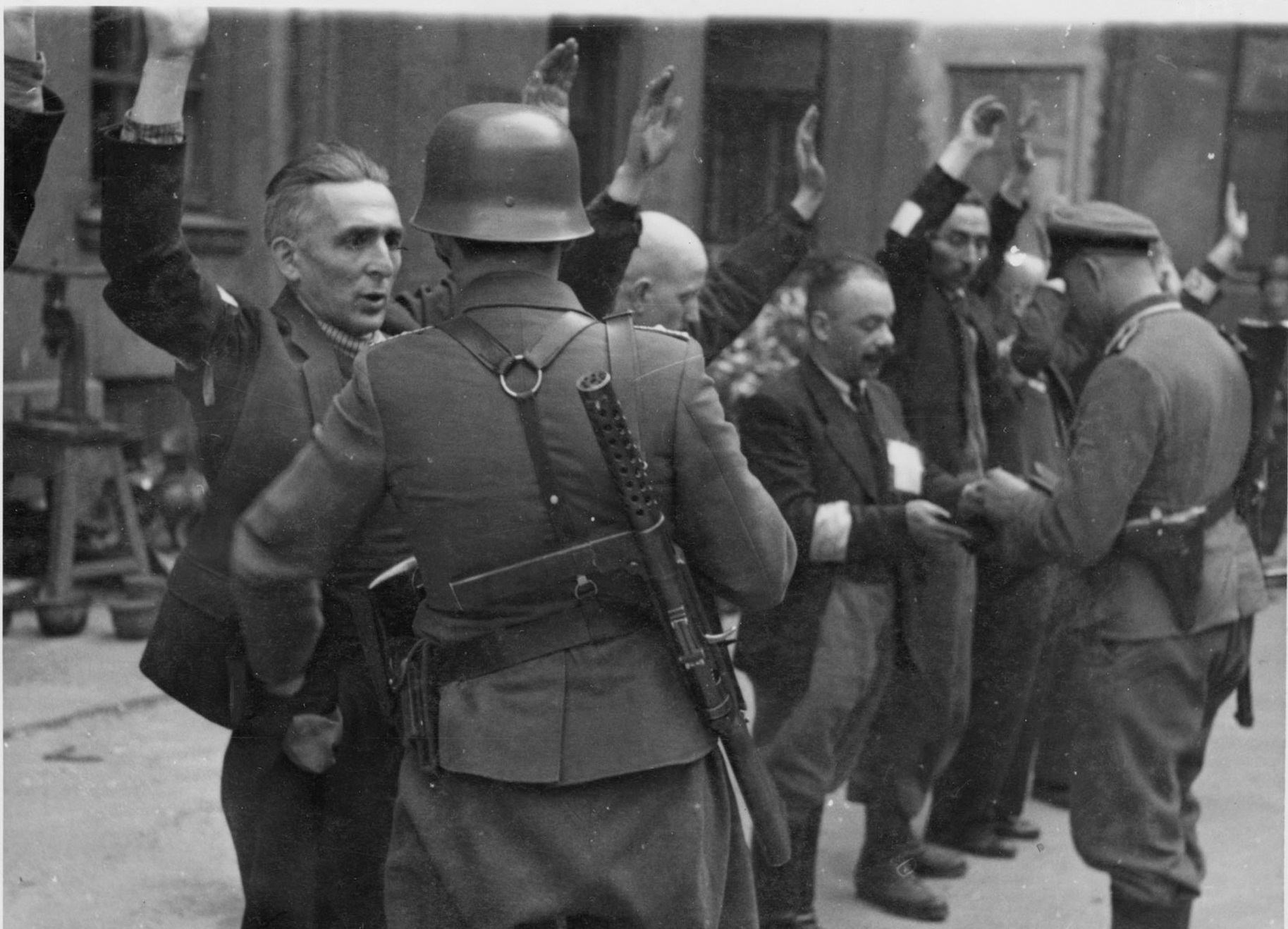
Photo from the Stroop Report of the Warsaw Ghetto Uprising, 1943; showing MP 28s.

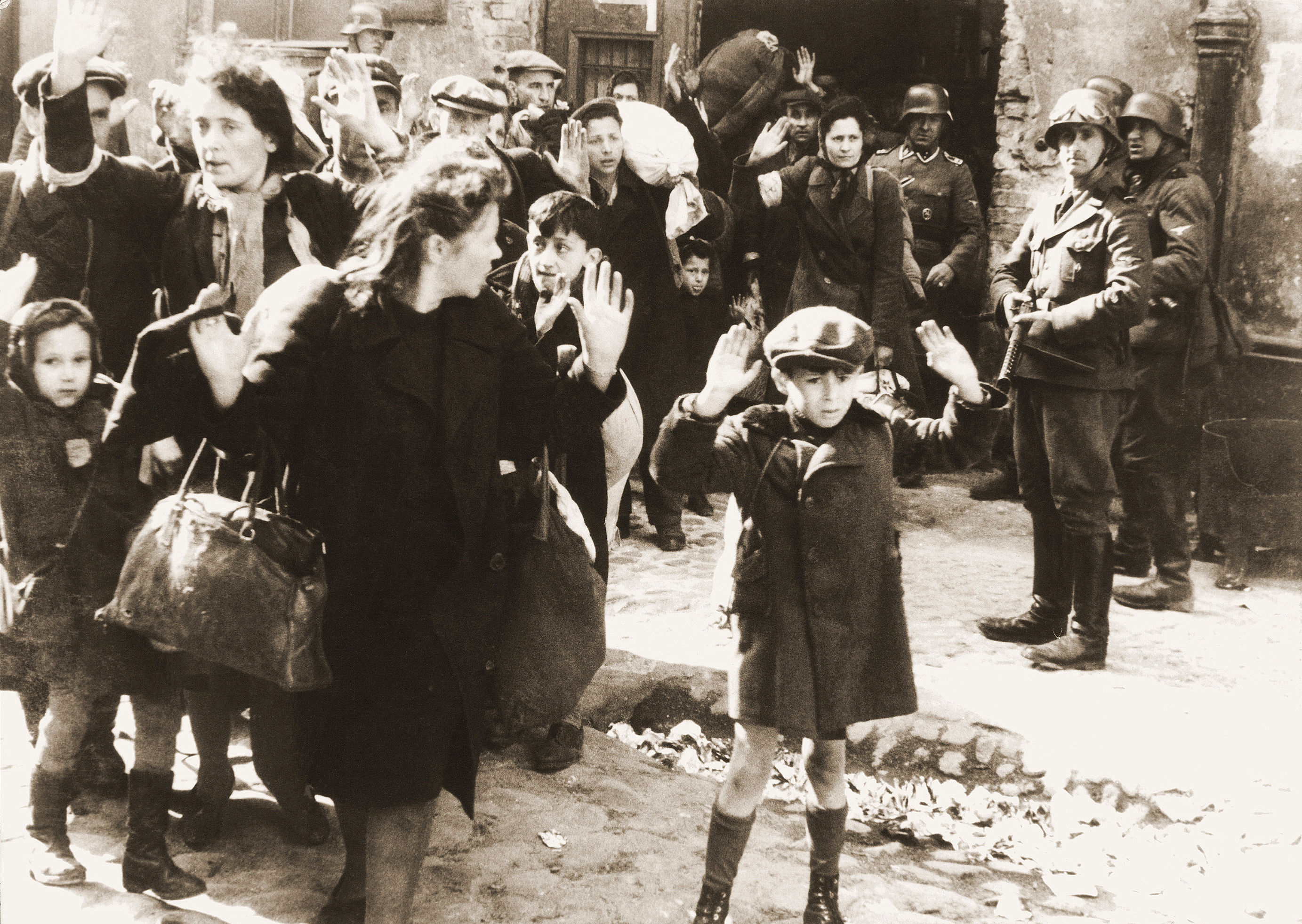
Photo from the Stroop Report of the Warsaw Ghetto Uprising, 1943; showing MP 28s.

== Bibliography ==
- de Quesada, Alejandro (2014). MP 38 and MP 40 Submachine Guns. Weapons 31. Osprey Publishing. ISBN 978-1780963884.
- Kazazyan, Agop (1998). Оръжието на българския полицай 1878–1944 [The Weapons of the Bulgarian Policeman 1878–1944] (in Bulgarian). Sofia: Svyat-Nauka. pp. 82–90. ISBN 954-8223-47-3.
