= JO.LO.AR. =

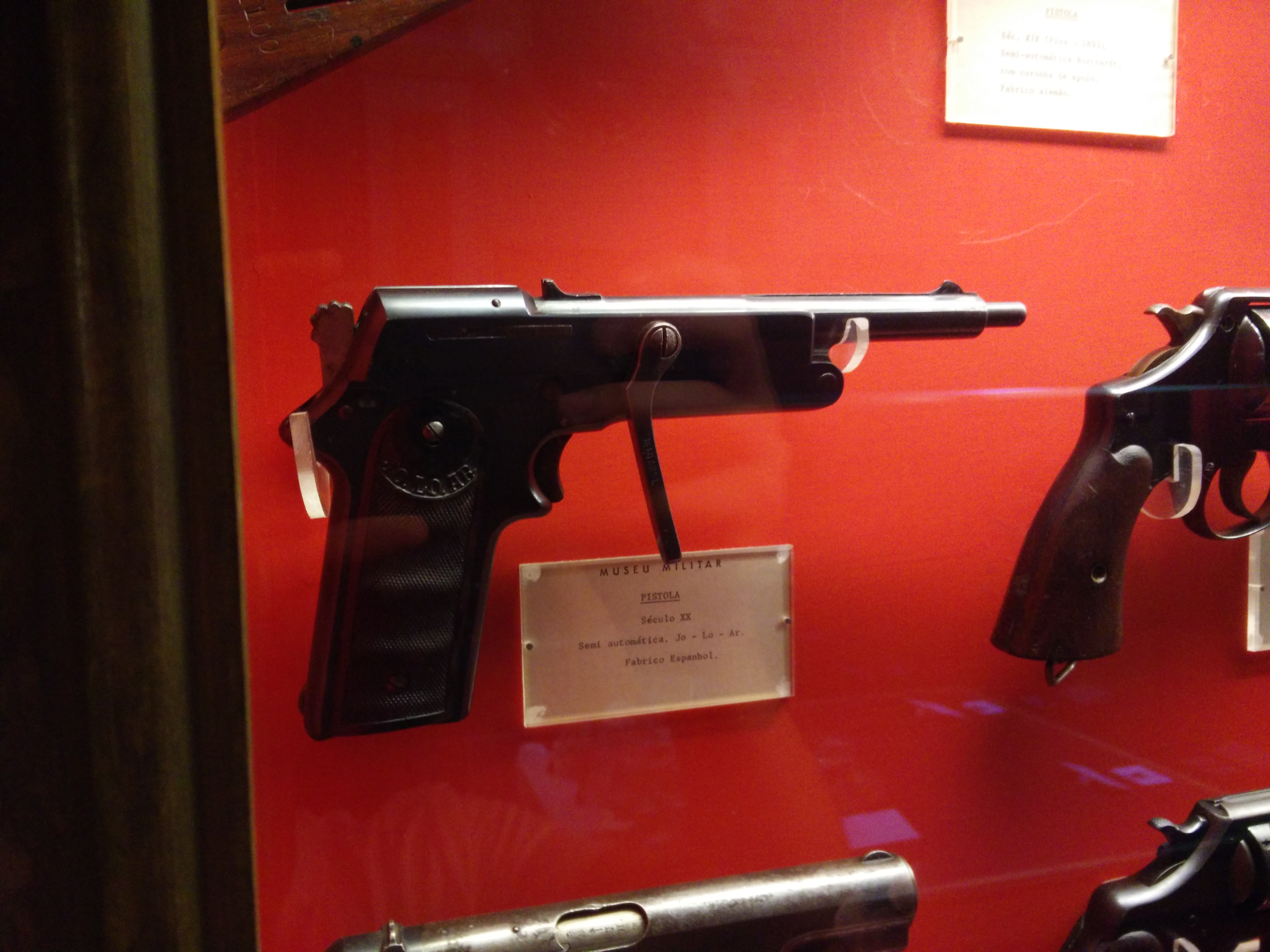
- Type: Semi-automatic pistol
- Place of origin: Spain

Service history
- Wars: Spanish Civil War

Production history
- Designer: J. Lopez de Arnaiz
- Designed: 1924
- Manufacturer: Star Bonifacio Echeverria, S.A.
- Produced: 1924-?

Specifications
- Cartridge: .25 ACP; .32 ACP; .380 ACP; 9x23mm Largo; .45 ACP
- Caliber: .25 (6.35 mm); .32 (7.65 mm); .380 (9 mm); .45 (11.43 mm)
- Action: Blowback
- Feed system: 9 round box magazine, depending on calibre
- Sights: Iron

The JO.LO.AR. was a semi-automatic pistol of Spanish origin and is chambered in various calibres. It is a development of the Extractor Model Sharpshooter pistol and was manufactured from 1924 by Bonifacio Echeveria STAR, with patent by J. Lopez de Arnaiz and renamed the JO-LO-AR, hence the designer's initials.

The new design lacked the trigger guard and it was chambered in a wide range of calibres from 6.35×16mm (.25 ACP), 7.65×17mm (.32 ACP), 9×17mm (.380 ACP), 9x23mm Largo, with most pistols exported to Peru in the 11.43×23mm (.45 ACP). The JO.LO.AR. pistols have a distinctive lever installed on the right hand side of the frame (referred as a Palanca) enabling the user to carry the pistol with the chamber empty and in time cock the weapon all with one hand which made it useful especially for the Peruvian Mounted Police who were on horseback. Many of these pistols were sold in the United States as surplus and can be considered as collectible firearms today.

== Users ==
- Peru – Peruvian Mounted Police
- Portugal – Acquired a small batch of pistols.
- Spain – Saw service during the Spanish Civil War.
