= Theodor Bergmann =

German businessman and firearms manufacturer

- Born: May 21, 1850; Sailauf, Kingdom of Bavaria
- Died: March 22, 1931 (aged 80); Gaggenau, Weimar Republic
- Occupations: Industrialist, inventor, firearms manufacturer

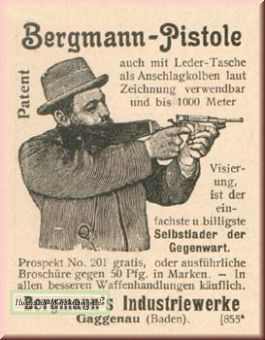
Bergmann pistol advertisement, 1900

Theodor Bergmann (21 May 1850 – 22 March 1931) was a German businessman, industrialist, and firearms manufacturer best known for developing a series of innovative automatic pistols, firearms, and early machine guns.

== Early life ==
Bergmann was born on 21 May 1850 in Sailauf, Kingdom of Bavaria. As a young man Bergmann worked for a local stovemaker, subsequently developing an interest in the metalworking trade. In 1879, he and his wife and family moved to Gaggenau, where he became a business partner of an ironworks company, the Eisenwerke Gaggenau GmbH and took full control over the firm after his senior partner Michael Flürscheim left the company in 1888. Due to disagreements with his financial backers over the company future direction, Bergmann set up a car factory in the Ottenau district of Gaggenau in the same year before leaving Eisenwerke Gaggenau in 1893 to start his own company, the Bergmann Industriewerke on 1 March 1894.

Before it became widely known as a firearms manufacturer, the Bergmann company produced a wide variety of products including stoves, fencing, regulators for gas heaters and stoves, enameled signs and air guns. With the help of Joseph Vollmer the firm also produced automobiles under the Orient Express brand until Bergmann's automobile division was taken over by Georg Wiss in 1905, who founded the Süddeutsche Automobilfabrik GmbH which produced trucks and buses until the company was bought by Carl Benz in 1910.

== Firearms designing ==
In 1892, Theodor Bergmann was approached by Otto Brauswetter, a Hungarian watchmaker with an idea for a locked breech automatic pistol. After filling a patent based on Brauswetter's idea in the same year, Bergmann partnered with Louis Schmeisser to refine the design for mass production.

The following are self-loading pistols designed by Bergmann and Schmeisser:

- Bergmann 1893
- Bergmann 1894
- Bergmann 1895
- Bergmann 1896
- Bergmann 1897 (also known as Bergmann Pieper)
- Bergmann 1898
- Bergmann 1899
- Bergmann 1901 (also known as Bergmann Simplex)
- Bergmann Mars
- Bergmann 1905
- Bergmann 1908
- Bergmann 1910
- Bergmann 1910/21

Theodor Bergmann also developed the locking system used in the Bergmann MG 15nA, a light machine gun designed during the First World War. The weapon was based on a patent filed by Bergmann in 1901 and was adopted by the German military during the later stages of the war.

== Later life and death ==
Theodor Bergmann's military pistol sales were less successful than he expected to be, and in 1910 he retired from the business, dying on 22 March 1931, at the age of 80 at Gaggenau, while his partner Louis Schmeisser left the Bergmann firm in 1921; in that same year the company was sold to the Aktiengesellschaft Lignose, an industrial combine that manufactured pocket pistols. After World War II, the Bergmann firm was best known for its chemical products.
