= Arsenal submachine gun =

Weapon from Estonia

- Type: Submachine gun
- Place of origin: Estonia

Service history
- In service: 1926–1940
- Used by: Estonia, Latvia, Spanish Republic
- Wars: Spanish Civil War; World War II

Production history
- Designer: Johannes Teiman
- Designed: 1926
- Manufacturer: Arsenal
- Produced: 1926
- No. built: 570

Specifications
- Length: 809 mm
- Barrel length: 210 mm
- Cartridge: 9x20 mm SR Browning
- Action: Blowback
- Rate of fire: 600 rounds/min
- Muzzle velocity: 365 m/s
- Feed system: 40 round detachable box magazine

The Arsenal M23 submachine gun (Estonian: Arsenali püstolkuulipilduja, also known as Arsenal Tallinn) is an Estonian submachine gun manufactured between 1926 and 1935.

These submachine guns were designed and produced in the Estonian military equipment factory "Arsenal" in Karjamaa, Tallinn, but production did not exceed 600 units. The weapon was chambered for the 9x20 mm semi-rimmed Browning cartridge to be compatible with ammunition for the Browning FN M1903 pistol which had been adopted by the Estonian Army. It operated on the blowback system and was essentially similar to the MP18.1; having a wooden stock, slotted barrel jacket, and horizontal left side magazine feed. A uniquely slender 40 round single column box magazine led to frequent cartridge feeding problems; and cooling fins which were machined lengthwise along the barrel to promote cooling air flow when firing (similar to the Lewis gun), unnecessarily complicated production.

It was used by the combat support units of the Border Guard, the Estonian Defence League and the Estonian Defence Forces. The Arsenal submachine gun was replaced in Estonian service by the Finnish Suomi KP/-31 submachine gun in 1938. The Estonian Army sold a few samples to Latvia and all of the remainder found their way to Republican forces during the Civil War in Spain.

== Used by ==
- Estonia
- Latvia
- Spanish Republic
