= Destroyer carbine =

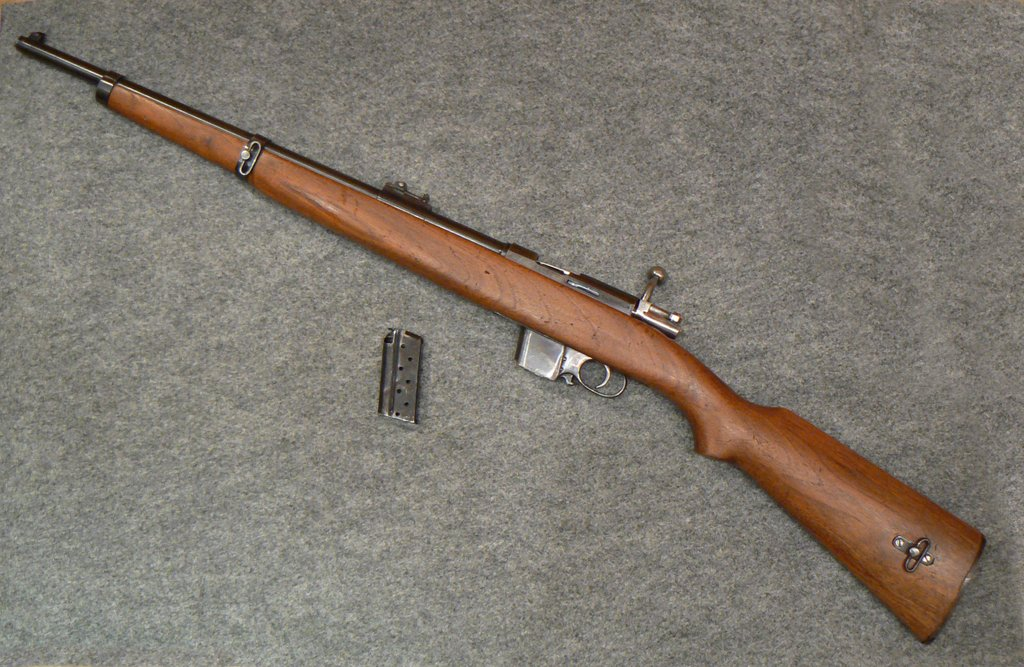
- Type: Pistol-caliber carbine
- Place of origin: Spain

Service history
- In service: 1935–1969
- Used by: See users
- Wars: Spanish Civil War; Vietnam War (limited)

Production history
- Manufacturer: Gaztanaga y Compania; Ayra Duria S.A.
- Variants: See variants

Specifications
- Cartridge: 9×23mm Largo; 9×19mm Parabellum (Civilian/export variants); .38 Super (Civilian/export variants)
- Action: Bolt-action
- Feed system: 6-shot single stack magazine
- Sights: Rear left sight, front post

The Destroyer Carbine is a small bolt-action carbine usually chambered for the 9×23mm Largo cartridge. It was used by Spanish police and prison services, including the Guardia Civil from the mid-1930s until the late 1960s, replacing the El Tigre Rifle. It continued the tradition, started in the 1890s, of issuing police units with a short, handy, repeating carbine in pistol ammunition calibre.

== Design ==
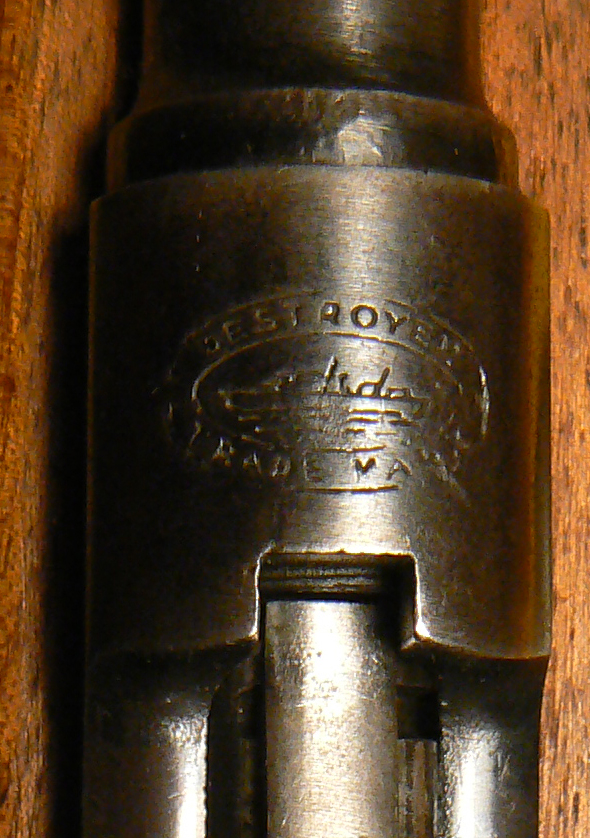
Markings on a Destroyer carbine

A loaded Destroyer carbine magazine

It is essentially a scaled-down Mauser Model 1893 with two rear-mounted locking lugs and a Mauser-style two-position flip safety. The Destroyer fired the same ammunition as the standard-issue police handgun but used a six-shot single stack magazine. The longer rifle barrel resulted in greater muzzle velocity, accuracy, and range.

The Destroyer was initially manufactured in Eibar, Spain by Gaztanaga y Compania, then by Ayra Duria S.A. and possibly others, with some minor improvements made over time.

The carbine is more accurate than a self-loading service pistol, not because of its barrel length, but mainly due to the lack of moving parts and the stable firing platform offered by a weapon with a sturdy shoulder stock. Due to the longer barrel, muzzle velocity was commonly 200fps—300fps higher than achieved by pistols. The better sights and longer sight radius are also critical in allowing the user to hit targets at greater distances.

While no longer in government service, the Destroyer Carbine is prized as a collector's item due to its comparative rarity, as well as being a desirable target rifle due to favorable shooting characteristics such as minimal recoil and relatively inexpensive ammunition.

While all rimless 9 mm caliber pistol cartridges will chamber in a Destroyer Carbine, and consequently will fire, it is extremely unsafe to use ammunition other than 9mm Largo due to the dangers of excessive pressure. Some carbines were produced in other calibers such as the .38 Super and 9×19mm Parabellum and offered for export.

== Variants ==
MAC Destroyer Carbine − Designed by former Office of Strategic Services (OSS) officer Mitchell WerBell III as a considerably more robust version of the silenced De Lisle carbine for special and clandestine operations in Indochina and chambered for the 9×19mm Parabellum cartridge. It was produced by the Military Armament Corporation for the United States Army.

WerBell designed at least five different versions:

- The first version had a shortened barrel and was fitted with an early version of the silencer used on the MAC-10 submachine gun;
- The second version used the MAC M14SS-1 silencer used on the M14 rifle and a Tasco telescopic sight with a 4× power magnification;
- The third variant used a two-piece silencer with a diameter of 38 mm (1.5 in) and a total length of 298 mm (11.75 in) that extended back to the Destroyer receiver;
- The fourth was identical to the third, but the wooden buttstock was replaced with a collapsible wire stock, fitted with a pistol grip and a Mossberg 4× scope. This version was demonstrated at the ARVN Infantry School in South Vietnam in the late 1960s, and in 1969, the US Army ordered a small batch (4 to 10) for evaluation;
- The last variant featured a simple silencer 280 mm (11 in) long that came back to 6.4 mm (1/4 in) of the receiver. This variant was delivered in quantity to the US Army. By the time a second order was placed, the supply of Spanish carbines in the United States market dried up, and as result, most of the MAC Destroyers delivered to the US Army were Remington Model 788 rifles converted to fire 9×19mm rounds, fitted with a Tasco 4× power scope, and modified to accept modified Walther P38 pistol magazines.

== Users ==
- Spain − Used by the Civil Guard.
- United States − MAC Destroyer Carbine, used during the Vietnam War.

=== Non-State Actors ===
- Viet Cong − Modified to accept Walther P38 magazines.

== See also ==
- Ruger 77/44
