= Campo Giro =

Pistol, saw service in the Spanish military

Campo-Giro
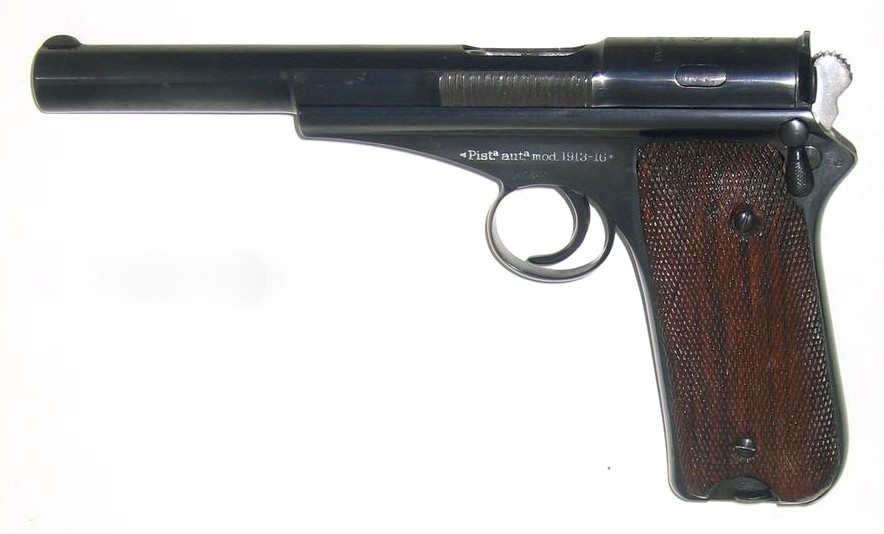
- Campo-Giro 1913–1916 model
- Type: Semi-automatic pistol
- Place of origin: Spain

Service history
- In service: 1912–1939
- Used by: Spain
- Wars: Rif Wars; Spanish Civil War

Production history
- Designed: 1904
- Produced: 1912–1919
- No. built: Modelo 1913: 1,300; Modelo 1913–1916: 13,625

Specifications
- Cartridge: 9×23mm Largo
- Caliber: 9mm
- Action: delayed blowback
- Feed system: 8-round magazine

The Campo-Giro was a semi-automatic pistol, chambered for the 9mm Largo cartridge, which saw service in the Spanish military. It is named for its designer, Army Colonel Venancio López de Ceballos y Aguirre, 3rd Count of Campo-Giro.

== Background ==
Venancio López de Ceballos y Aguirre was born in 1856 in Peñacastillo, Santander. He attended the Academia Militar de Caballería (Military Cavalry Academy) from 1876 to 1879, and graduated as a second lieutenant and first in his class. In 1881 he enrolled in the Academia de Estado Mayor (General Staff Academy), becoming staff lieutenant in 1885. He held a number of positions until 1893 when he was posted to Melilla. In 1894 he was promoted to major and the following year posted to Cuba as Chief of Staff for the Matanzas brigade. He was based there when the US Navy bombarded Matanzas during the Spanish–American War. He was appointed Chief of Staff for the 3rd Division, 1st Corps and decorated for his Cuban service. On his return to Spain he was elected to the Spanish parliament and in 1905, one year after his first patent, placed on the retired list. In 1909 he was promoted to lieutenant colonel, and in 1911 returned to active duty. He ended his career in 1912 as aide-de-camp to General Fernando Primo de Rivera, uncle of the future Spanish dictator.

== Development ==
Campo-Giro obtained his first patent in 1904 for Una pistola automática de calibre 9mm. de nuevo sistema ("An automatic pistol of 9mm calibre of a new system"). He followed this in 1911 with a patent for a self-loading carbine. In 1912 he obtained a registered design for his pistol. In November that year lodged another patent for Una pistola sistema Campo-Giro con amortiguador del choque en el retroceso, para los calibres 11,25, 9mm largo, 9mm corto y 7,65mm ("A Campo-Giro system pistol with a shock-absorber for recoil in calibre 11.25, 9mm largo, 9mm Kurz and 7.65mm").

The pistol was adopted for the Spanish army in 1912 as the Pistola Campo-Giro de 9mm Modelo 1912. The previously issued Bergmann–Bayard pistol which was found unsuitable for military use during the early Moroccan campaigns was however still retained by those troops who had been issued with it, the 9mm Largo cartridge having been judged a success. Early examples were manufactured by the Oviedo armoury. The design proved both modern and sound and the pistol saw widespread use during extended trials.

== Production ==
After an unknown number of Modelo 1912 pistols had been manufactured, the army became aware that an improved version of the pistol that had been developed, and in January 1914 this was adopted as the Pistola Campo-Giro de 9mm Modelo 1913. The Model 1913 was manufactured by Esperanza y Unceta and the increased orders triggered their move to a new factory in Guernica. During 1914 1,300 pistols were made before production was halted to include new modifications.

The Modelo 1913 was a delayed blowback design, unusual in a gun chambered for a powerful military cartridge. The Campo-Giro used a powerful spring to handle the recoil of the 9mm Largo cartridge, and had a smaller spring beneath the barrel to serve as a shock absorber and delay the opening of the breech. It retained an external hammer and a top ejection port like the Bergmann–Bayard, but had its magazine in the grip instead in front of the trigger guard, thus allowing a much longer barrel to be fitted. The magazine release lever was just behind the oval-shaped trigger guard between it and the front of the frame. The slide was fixed to the frame by a transverse wedge behind the breech that in turn was held in place by the firing pin. The Campo-Giro was over 225 mm (8.9 in) long, weighed over 900 g (2.0 lb) unloaded, and had an 8-round magazine. It produced a greater muzzle velocity from the 9 mm Largo round than did the Bergmann–Bayard, due to its longer (165 mm or 6.5 in) barrel. The pistol was well made and accurate, but difficult to disassemble.

Campo-Giro patented new improvements in 1913, 1914, and 1915, resulting in a redesigned frame, redesigned mainspring and the magazine release being moved to the bottom of the grip. Because of the First World War, the supply of black buffalo horn that was used for the grips was interrupted and wood was substituted. The improved model was adopted in September 1916 as the Pistola Campo-Giro de 9mm, Modelo 1913-16. However, by 1919 the Spanish military had begun looking for yet another new pistol. However they did not stray far, as the Campo-Giro was the direct forerunner of the Astra tubular slide guns such as the Astra Modelo de 1921/Model 400 which were subsequently adopted. Despite being declared obsolete, many were re-issued during the Spanish Civil War. Campo-Giro did not live to see the success of his creation, dying after a riding accident in Madrid on 22 May 1916.
