= Gaztañaga Destroyer =

Spanish pistol

Gaztañaga Destroyer was a semi-automatic pistol designed by Isidro Gaztañaga in Eibar, Basque Country, in 1913, using .25 ACP caliber. It was produced in Gaztañaga y Companía, Eibar, Basque Country, and is notable for being a common Spanish handgun with the Eibar Type safety located above the grip. It was followed in production by a .32 ACP version which was produced for the French army during World War I. The standard magazine contained nine rounds, but in production models used only six or seven. The weapon is a copy of John Browning's 1906 pistols. The pistol bears the name "I.G". It was also issued to Spanish fifth columnists in the Spanish Civil War due to its small size (and hence was able to be concealed easily). The .25ACP round was not very powerful and was of use only at very close range. The barrel length is 2 inches (5.1 cm) and the overall length of the gun is slightly over 4.25 inches (10.8 cm).

== Sources ==
- J. Howard Mathews, Firearms identification: The laboratory examination of small arms, rifling characteristics in handguns, and notes on the automatic pistols., Vol.I., Charles C Thomas Publisher, Springfield Ill., 1973
- Ian V. Hogg, John Weeks, Pistols of the World, Arms and Armour Press, London, 1978
- Philip McFarland, Burton Brenner, editors., Golden State Arms World's Guns And Other Weapons, Peterson Publishing Co., 1958
