= Locked breech =

Element of firearm design

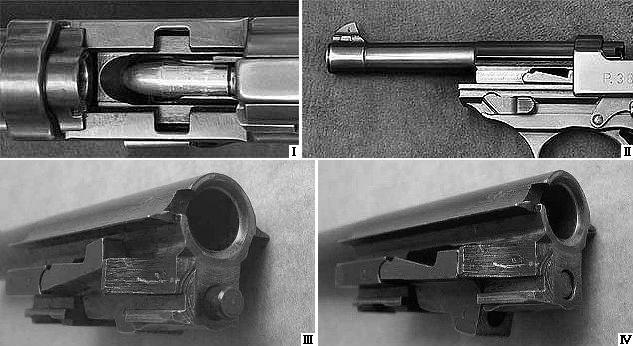
Short Recoil Lock from Walther P38

Locked breech is the design of a breech-reloading firearm's action. This is important in understanding how a self-reloading firearm works. In the simplest terms, the locked breech is one way to slow down the opening of the breech of a self-reloading firearm when fired. The source of power for the movement is recoil.

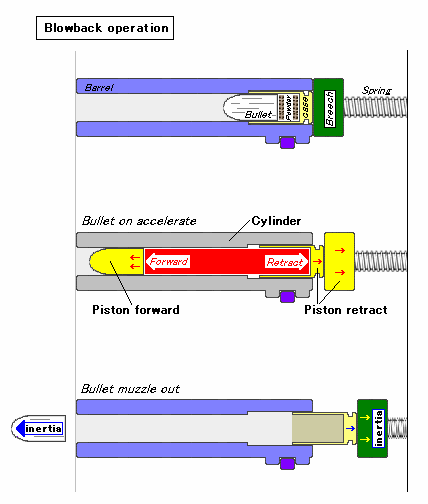
Blowback action

Flapper locking

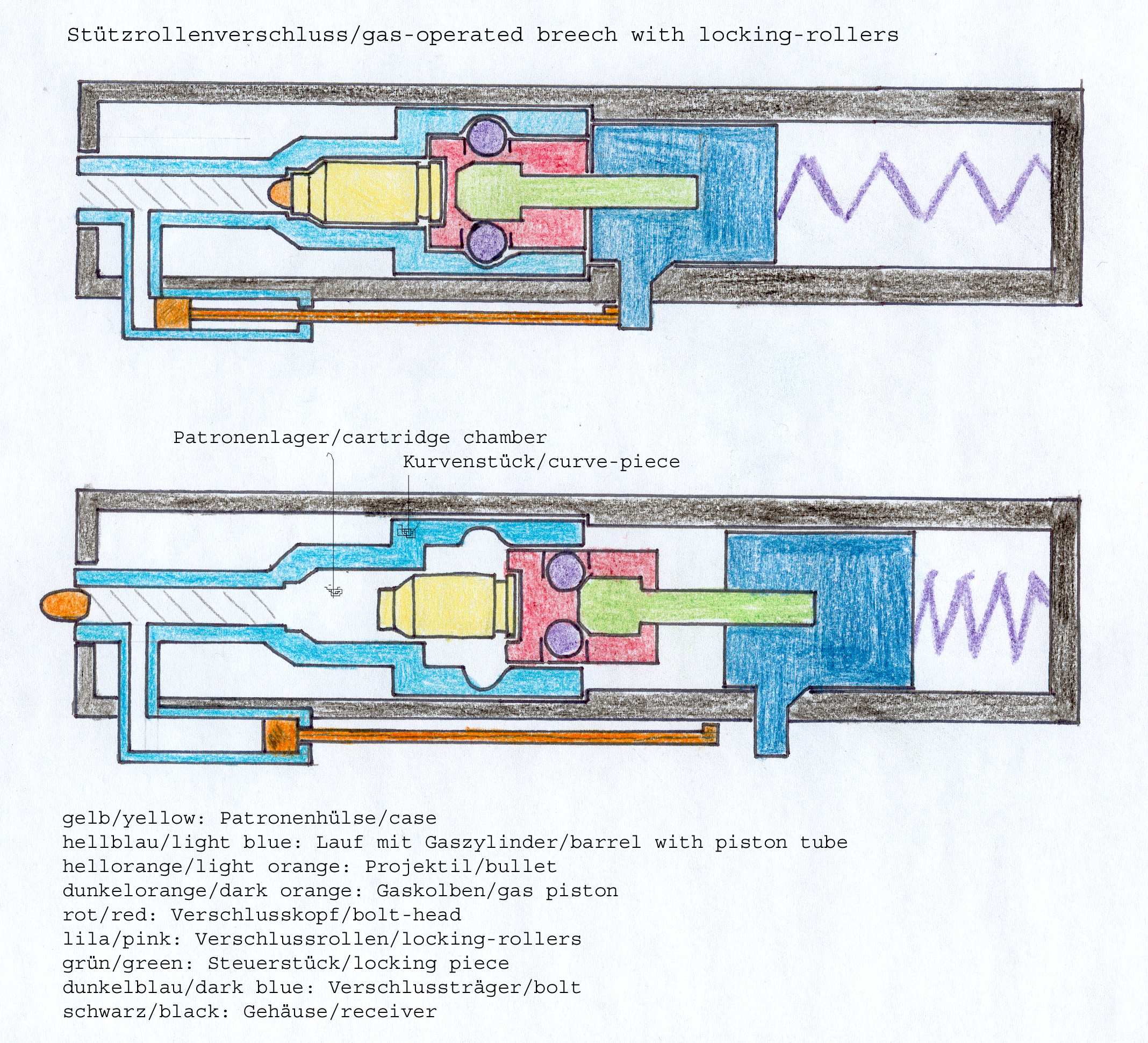
Roller locking action

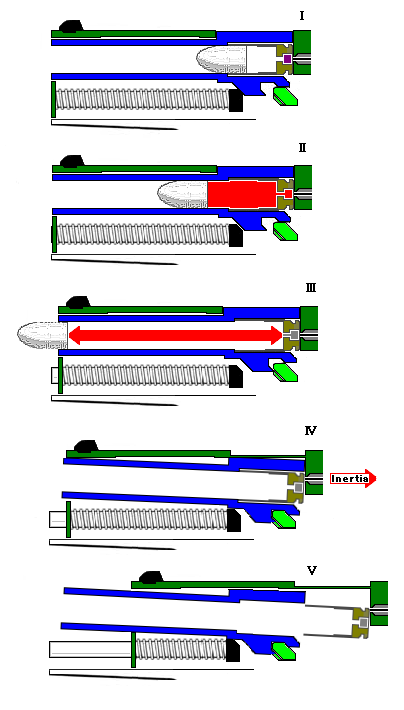
SIG Sauer short recoil system

The principle of firing a projectile from a firearm is that when the propellant in a bullet's casing is ignited, the propellant burns quickly for a very short time. This creates a high-pressure pocket of gas that expands, pushing the projectile (bullet) out of the chamber and down the barrel of the firearm. If the high-pressure gas were not confined within certain parts of the weapon, it could damage the firearm or injure the shooter. A 'locked breech' barrel confines the high-pressure gas to the barrel, allowing the gas to expand and cool without risk of damaging weapon or shooter. Because of the pressure drop, a breech block can be opened in a self-reloading firearm due to the recoil inertia generation by the movement of the projectile.

== Versus other types ==
Blowback
This action relies on the inertia of a breechblock to delay breech opening until pressures have dropped to safe levels. This is not a locked breech and works by the cartridge case pushing against the breech and moving while there is pressure in the chamber. The inertia of the slide/breechblock will allow the case to move immediately but not so fast that dangerous pressures escape. Blowback firearms sometimes lack an extractor as they really aren't necessary for this method of operation.
Delayed blowback
this action is similar to simple blowback but uses leverage to increase the amount of force used to push the bolt back, thus reducing the required bolt mass and spring stiffness and allowing the chambering of higher pressure rounds such as rifle rounds. There are many methods of delayed blowback such as a spring loaded lever such as the FAMAS. Other versions include the use of a gas piston using propellant gases to delay the opening of the breach, such as the Heckler & Koch P7.
Locked breech
This action is used when the pressure in the chamber is high enough that the opening of the breech would occur too rapidly with simple or delayed blowback which could cause weapons damage or human injury. The breechblock is "locked" into the barrel. At the point of firing the inertia pushes the barrel and slide/breechblock backwards together for a certain distance. This type of action utilizes the inertia of the locked together slide/breech and barrel so that its inertia prevents movement too quickly. The locking mechanism will disengage after a certain amount of travel at which time the pressures will have dropped.

The main difference is that there is a very strong lock in the locked breech action whereas blowback systems rely on the inertia of components to provide safe operation. The type of action used by a firearms designer will be determined by the design goal inherent for that firearm. The three actions described are increasingly more expensive to manufacture.

== Mechanism ==
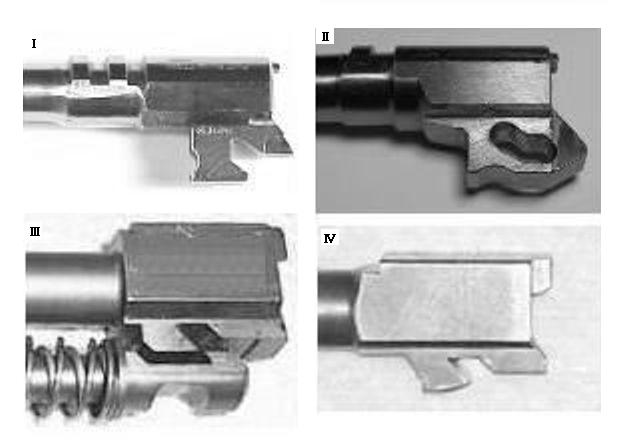
I: Petter-Browning; II: CZ 75; III: HK USP; IV: Glock (SIG Sauer System)

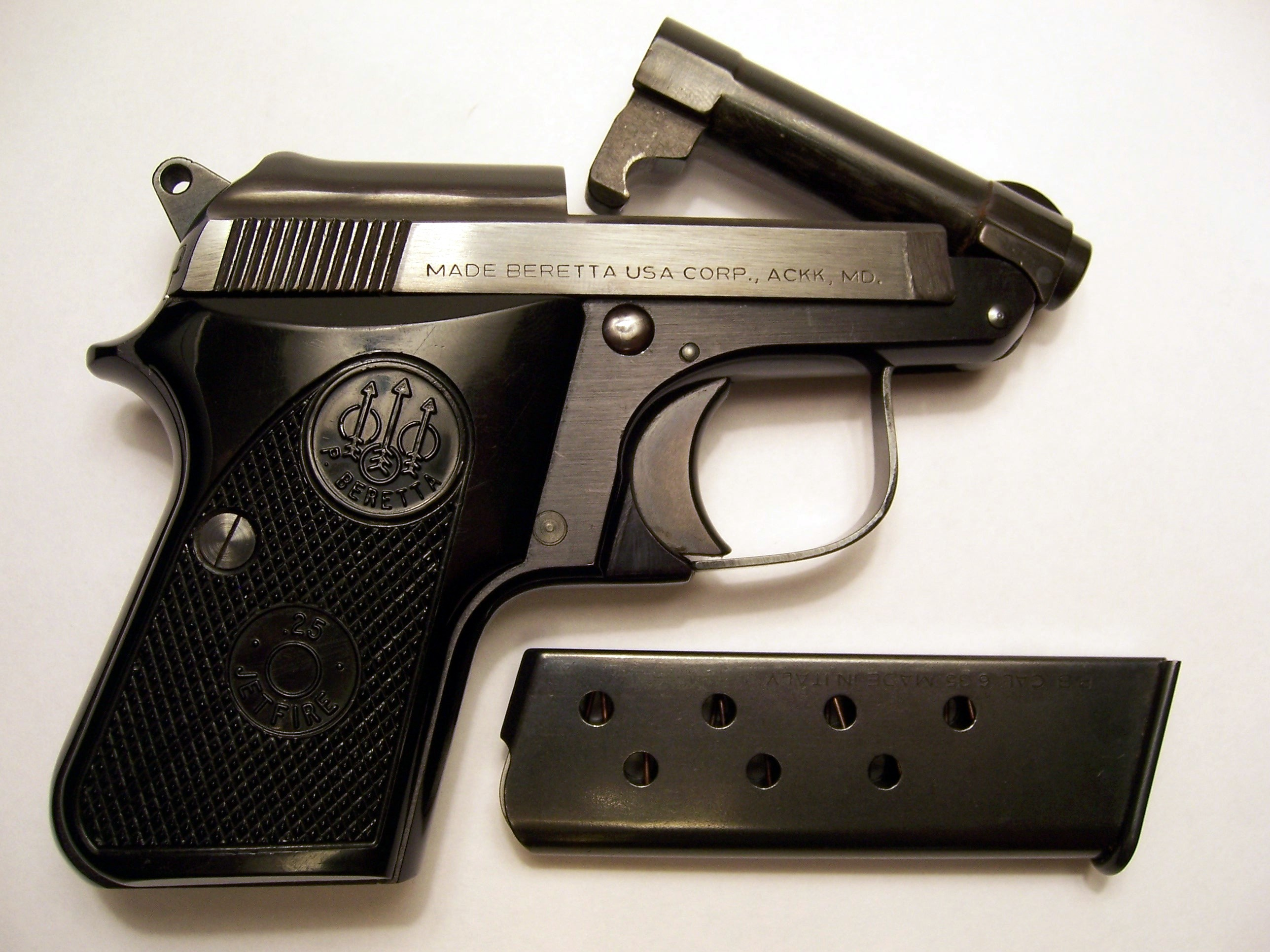
Beretta 950 tilting barrel

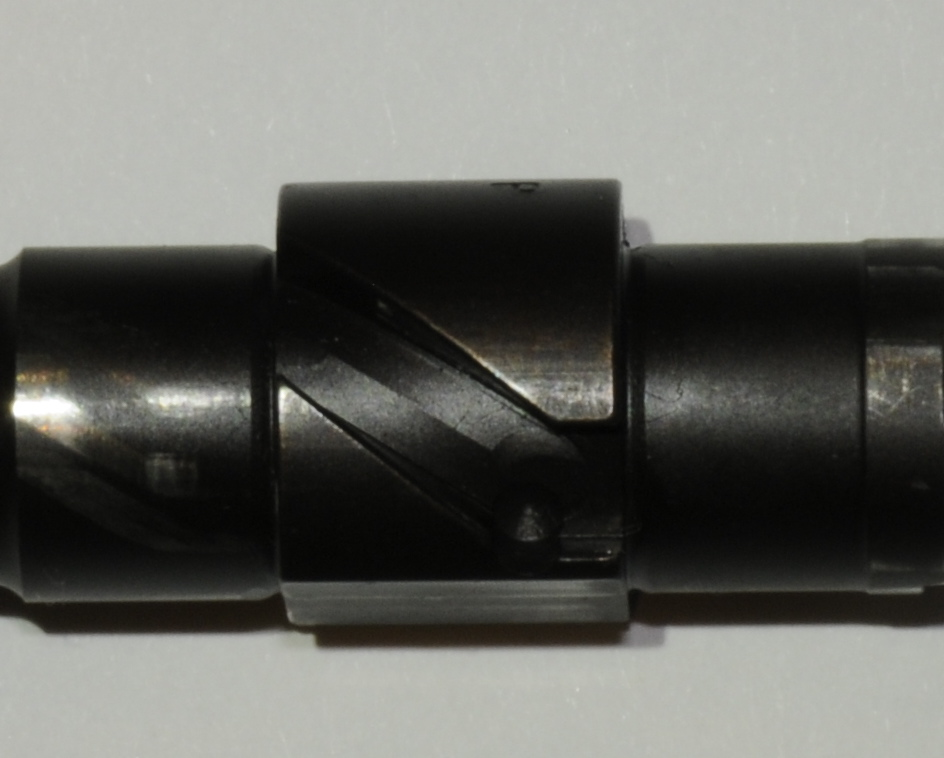
Beretta PX 4 Rotary locking barrel

The locked breech systems in handguns and rifle vary significantly. The photograph showing four handgun barrels illustrates the evolution of handgun locked breech systems in four of the most famous firearms. This is from the Browning Hi-Power (I in the photograph), John Browning's last design. The second barrel is of the same action type in the CZ 75 handgun. The third barrel type is from an HK USP pistol. The fourth barrel is from a Glock (which uses the SIG Sauer system).

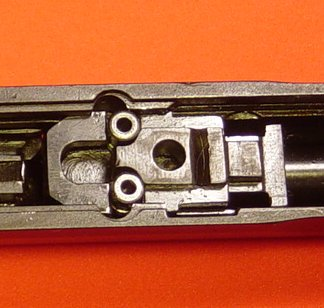
CZ model 52 roller locking system

The photograph on the right is of a different type of locking system. This one is the Beretta Rotary locking system found in their PX Four Storm handgun. The next photograph on the right is of the CZ model 52 showing a roller locking system. Some sources describe this as a delayed blowback action but it is actually a locked breech.

== locking systems ==
Rotating bolt

In a rotating bolt firearm the bolt is locked onto the barrel by multiple lugs arranged radially, rotating the lugs unlocks the bolt to move backwards, examples of rotating bolt firearms include the M16, AK-47, and several Bolt action rifles

Tilting bolt

In a tilting bolt firearm the bolt is locked by a recess at the bottom of the barrel extension, pivoting the bolt upward, examples of tilting bolt firearms include the FN FAL, the soviet SKS and the M1895 Lee Navy.

Roller locked

In a Roller locked firearm(not to be confused with Roller delayed blowback) the bolt is locked by a series of spring loaded rollers forced into recesses by a locking piece, pulling the locking piece out causes the spring to pull in the rollers, unlocking the bolt, examples include the MG 42 GPMG, the CZ 52 pistol and the experimental EM-2 rifle.

Flapper locked

In a Flapper locked firearm the bolt is locked by flappers that lock onto recesses in the barrel extension, the bolt is unlocked by the arms rotating into the bolt, examples include the Gewehr 43 rifle, the soviet Dp-28 LMG, and the swiss MG 51 GPMG.

Toggle locked

In a toggle locked action(not to be confused with a Toggle-delayed blowback) the bolt is locked by an over-center Toggle linkage, the bolt is unlocked by pivoting the toggle out of the over-center position, examples include the Luger p08 pistol, the Maxim machine gun and the Walther automatic shotgun.

Tilting barrel

In a tilting barrel firearm the slide is unlocked by the barrel pivoting downwards, this system is commonly used in pistols such as the M 1911, the Browning Hi-Power and the Glock séries of pistols.

Rotary barrel

in a rotary barrel firearm the slide is locked by lugs arranged radially in the barrel(like a reversed rotating bolt), the slide unlocks by the barrel rotating, examples include the Beretta Px4 Storm, the Steyr M1912 pistol and the KelTec PR57.

Locking piece

in a locking piece firearm the bolt is locked into the barrel extension by an locking piece, the locking piece pivots down to unlock the bolt, examples include the Fiat Revelli M1914, the Walther P38 and the Beretta 92.

== Examples of use ==
In the late 19th century, firearms makers learned how to use this mechanical force to create "self-loading" weapons, whether they were in artillery, rifles, shotguns, or handguns. The lower-powered calibers such as .22 caliber rimfire, (example gun) Walther P22 .22 Rimfire handgun were able to self-load using the energy produced by the .22 rimfire cartridges which simply blew the action open to reload a new cartridge. (This is called simple blowback.)

As cartridges grew in size and power the amount of recoil in the chamber increased. The energy created by larger and higher pressure cartridges, such as 9×19mm Parabellum pistol cartridge, results in violent movement of the gun's action.

In the case of simple blowback (and delayed blowback) the changes needed for a firearm to be able to control the higher amount of inertia and higher chamber pressures resulted in firearms design changes. Some designers handled this problem by making the moving parts of the firearm heavier and the strength/size of the recoil spring much greater (IE: Brixia 930 light machine gun), or multiple return springs (SIG SG 510). Firearms such as the .25 ACP Beretta SB950, take a great deal of force to chamber a round. Beretta solved this problem with a tilting barrel which allowed loading without having to pull the slide to the rear.

Gun makers developed ways to keep the actions from opening too soon by "locking" the breech closed. Using this technique a firearm, such as the Colt .45 ACP Government model handgun was made which featured a grooved barrel and a grooved slide which were cammed together to prevent the breech from opening. The camming mechanism "locked" the breech closed until the entire barrel and slide assembly had moved far enough that the pressure in the chamber was low enough to safely unlock the breech during the process of ejecting the spent casing which was followed by loading a new loaded cartridge.

== Short versus long recoil ==
Firearms that are physically small, such as handguns, use a system of recoil referred to as short recoil. This is adequate for the smaller calibers. In large firearms such as the Browning M2HB .50 caliber machine gun a similar system called long recoil is used. The difference is how far the breech and barrel recoil together after a shot is fired.

Locked recoil systems rely on timing to allow safe operation. A very heavy bolt mechanism can be used (such as in sub-machineguns) to slow the rate of movement and reduce the rate of fire. This is not adequate with higher velocity and higher energy cartridges. Rifles and most handguns use locked breech designs to control recoil safely.

The amount of mass of the components, the strength of springs, and the distance the barrel and slide are allowed to recoil is carefully calculated and tested to ensure safety.

== See also ==
- Glossary of firearms terms
