= Labora Fontbernat M-1938 =

Spanish submachine gun

M-1938 submachine gun
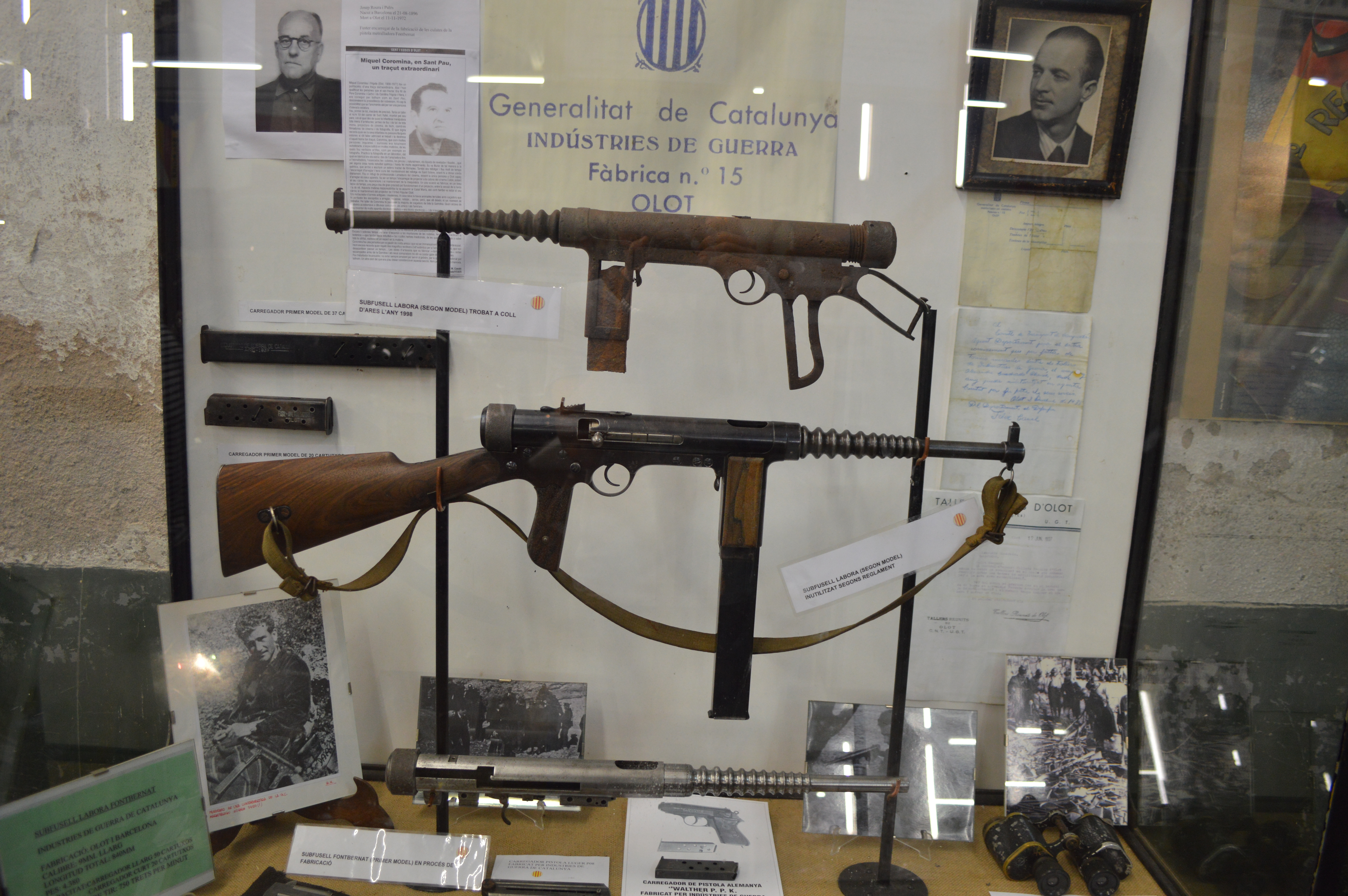
- A couple of Labora submachine guns and the bore of a Fontbernat
- Type: Submachine gun
- Place of origin: Spain

Service history
- Used by: Second Spanish Republic
- Wars: Spanish Civil War; World War II

Production history
- Designed: 1936
- Manufacturer: Factory Nº15
- Produced: 1936-1938
- No. built: 1,000-2,000

Specifications
- Mass: 4.38 kg (empty)
- Length: 806 mm
- Barrel length: 262 mm
- Cartridge: 9x23mm Largo
- Caliber: 9mm
- Action: Blowback
- Rate of fire: 750 rpm
- Muzzle velocity: 397 m/s
- Feed system: 36 round box magazine
- Sights: Iron sights

The Labora Fontbernat M-1938 was a submachine gun of Catalan origin and was used by both the Spanish Republican Army and the Nationalist faction during the Spanish Civil War. It was made from machined steel and chambered in the 9x23mm Largo round.

== Users ==
- Spanish State (Captured from the Republicans. Continued to see service used post-war)
- Spanish Republic
