= Schmeisser =

Schmeisser may refer to:

- MP 40, a German World War II submachine gun often called "Schmeisser"
- Louis Schmeisser (1848–1917), German infantry weapons designer, father of Hugo Schmeisser and Hans Schmeisser
- Hugo Schmeisser (1884–1953), German infantry weapons designer
- Hans Schmeisser, German infantry weapons designer
- Schmeisser Award, an NCAA lacrosse award
- Johann Gottlob Schmeisser (1751-1806), Canadian Lutheran minister
- Johann Gottfried Schmeisser (1767–1837), German chemist and naturalist, amongst others Fellow of the Royal Society and member of the Linnean Society of London
