= Hugo Schmeisser =

German firearm designer (1884–1953)

- Born: Hugo Schmeisser; 24 September 1884; Jena, Saxe-Weimar-Eisenach, German Empire
- Died: 12 September 1953 (aged 68); Suhl, East Germany
- Occupation: Inventor
- Father: Louis Schmeisser

Hugo Schmeisser (24 September 1884 – 12 September 1953) was a German firearm developer.

Schmeisser was born in Jena, Thuringia. His father, Louis Schmeisser (1848–1917), was one of the best-known weapons designers in Europe. The life and work of Hugo Schmeisser mostly took place in the weapons manufacturing city of Suhl, Thuringia.

== Before and during World War I ==
The submachine guns of Theodor Bergmann are closely connected with its name recognition and weapons production in the time leading up to the First World War. Schmeisser also received his fundamental training in weapons technology at Bergmann, where 7.63 mm and 9 mm machine gun rounds were being researched. He remained in Suhl during World War I because of the importance of his expertise in machine gun technology.

== Before and during World War II ==
Manufacturing regulations in the Treaty of Versailles (June 28, 1919) forbade Germany from developing heavy machine guns, but permitted machine pistols or submachine guns as a suitable weapon for police. This signaled the end of a 30-year cooperation between the Schmeissers and Bergmann as production was licensed to foreign weapons manufacturers. Schmeisser decided to continue work in weapons development. Together with his brother Hans Schmeisser, he created the "Industriewerk Auhammer Koch und Co" (Industrial Auhammer Koch and Company) in Suhl. Being at the end of World War I, he saw little business, and encumbered by the Treaty of Versailles, the future of the company was unclear. Schmeisser defied the treaty, working to continue development of automatic weapons. It was at this time that the company began cooperating with: C. G. Haenel Waffen- u. Fahrradfabrik Suhl (C.G. Haenel), beginning a 20-year partnership. For the safety of his patents, Schmeisser created a second company under the name of "Brothers Schmeisser" in the summer of 1922. This shrewd tactic was to prevent the loss of his patents if Auhammer went bankrupt. In order to prevent bankruptcy on both sides, Auhammer and Haenel merged, with Haenel taking full responsibility and liability for Auhammer business affairs. Schmeisser's attorneys who settled the deal became active shareholders in the company. Before long, it was obvious that development of many types of automatic weapons was unaffected or even accelerated by the Treaty of Versailles. In the 1920s Schmeisser developed the MP28, which was used extensively by the German police. Bayard signed an agreement with Schmeisser to manufacture and sell weapons to South Africa and Spain, among other countries. It is notable that these same weapons were used during the Spanish Civil War only 10 years later. Despite Schmeisser's success, the company often came within inches of bankruptcy.

As the Nazis rose to power during 1933, ten weapons development enterprises in Suhl and Zella-Mehlis merged under the name of "United Suhl-Zella Mehlis Armament Makers". This central administration was used to coordinate production with the army's needs, and it allowed Schmeisser to make a business acquaintance, which later developed to a friendship, with the aviator Ernst Udet, a deputy of Hermann Göring under Germany's Luftwaffe. Schmeisser had a direct role in military production decisions, often influencing the decisions of Adolf Hitler and Göring. After 1935 Haenel experienced an enormous upswing in weapon production. Against the desires of many engineers and technical designers, the Schmeisser brothers continued to enforce patent royalties and manage company funds.

Berthold Geipel of Erma designed the MP 36 using Vollmer's EMP. The chief designer, Heinrich Vollmer, revised the basic construction of Erma MP-36 and developed from it the well-known German submachine guns of the Second World War, the MP-38 and the MP-40. 1.2 million pieces were manufactured for these weapons, and were among the first weapons to be manufactured with die cast parts, metal stamping, and a complete machine-assembly. This method revolutionized weapon production, allowing manufacture at an unprecedented speed. They became internationally known as "Schmeisser MP"s, mainly due to the use of the straight magazine he had patented.

Schmeisser's most important work had been underway since 1938. This new automatic weapon, with a shortened 7.92 mm cartridge, allowed for smart usage of resources and high production. At first named the Mkb 42, it later received the designation of MP-43, and it became one of the first assault rifles. By 1943, 10,000 had been manufactured for the front. In 1944, after troop testing verified the new weapon's effectiveness, Hitler authorized mass production of the MP-43 as well as further research into a new MP-44. In April 1944 the new weapon received the designation of "Sturmgewehr 44" ("Assault Rifle 44"). The StG 44 was arguably Schmeisser's most important weapon development.

== After World War II ==
On 3 April 1945 American troops began to occupy the city of Suhl. Weapons manufacturing was prohibited during this time. Hugo Schmeisser and his brother Hans were interrogated for weeks by weapon expert teams of the American and British secret services. At the end of June 1945, American troops evacuated Suhl and all of Thuringia. One month later, the Red Army assumed control over the area, starting a civilian works project to manufacture weapons for the Soviet Union. By August 1945, the Red Army had created 50 StG 44s from existing assembly parts, and had begun inspecting their design. 10,785 sheets of technical designs were confiscated by the Soviets as part of their research.

Schmeisser was one of 16 Germans for which a special department (no. 58) was created at factory number 74, later known as Izhmash. Schmeisser was appointed as one of the five designers of the group, together with Kurt Horn and Werner Gruner (both from Grossfuss) and Oscar Schink (from Gustloff), under the formal leadership of Karl Barnitzke (also from Gustloff). There is some evidence that Schmeisser was uncooperative with the Soviets; he received the most negative review by his Soviet handlers in this group of designers. In these Soviet reviews, Schmeisser was described as a "practical man", whose lack of formal training showed whenever he was presented with any design problems.

Schmeisser worked in Izhevsk until 1952 when he and other German specialists returned to Germany. At short notice, his stay in the Soviet Union was extended beyond that of the other weapon specialists by a half year. He finally returned home on 9 June 1952. Schmeisser died on 12 September 1953, and was buried in Suhl. The 50th anniversary of his death was honored by a ceremony held in Suhl, as he is recognized as one of the most important technical designers of infantry weapons of the 20th century.

There is a theory about Hugo Schmeisser's participation in the design and development of the Kalashnikov AK-47 rifle due to its visual similarities to the Sturmgewehr 44. (Note: Despite appearances, the two rifle designs differ considerably in their internal design. Differences include the bolt locking mechanism, trigger mechanism and the placement of the rifles' recoil springs.) There are two main reasons why this theory may not be true: Firstly, the AK-47 was designed and its first experimental specimen was produced at Factory No. 2 in Kovrov, the same factory that hosted the design bureau of Vasiliy Degtyaryov. Kalashnikov moved to Izhevsk only in 1948, when serial manufacture of AK-47 was ordered for troop trials. Secondly, when production of the recently adopted AK was transferred from Factory No. 524 to Factory No. 74 in 1949, the official orders explicitly prohibited German engineers working there from access to classified developments, including the AK. However, the Soviets were under no obligation to disclose to Schmeisser the purpose of the work they employed him to complete.

== Designs ==
Schmeisser had no role in the development of the MP-40 submachine gun despite its nickname "Schmeisser", although he held a patent on the magazine.

- Bergmann Nr. 7 mod. 1903 Mars pistol; externally resembling the Mauser C96. 16,000 units made together by Bergmann's company and by Anciens Etablissements Pieper (under license), most chambered in 9mm Largo.
- Bergmann MG 15nA machine gun; light machine gun (by World War I standards, 12.9 kg) manufactured in 5,000 units towards the end of the war.
- Bergmann MP 18; about 17,000 made, not counting various clones and close copies.
- Haenel Schmeisser mod. I pocket pistol in 6.35 mm, based on two Schmeisser patents. Some 40,000 were made.
- Haenel mod. 1928 air pistol; externally resembling the Parabellum P08. about 25,000 units sold.
- MP 28
- Haenel mod. 33 Junior; an air rifle resembling the Kar98.
- MP 41, about 26,500 made mostly for export to the Nazi Germany allies.
- MkB 42(H)
- MP 43/1
- StG 44 (former MP 43, MP 44)
- StG 45(H); new roller-delayed design; one captured prototype was tested at Aberdeen Proving Grounds
