= Maschinenkarabiner 36 =

M.K. 36, III
- Type: Submachine gun
- Place of origin: Nazi Germany

Production history
- Designer: Hugo Schmeisser
- Designed: 1936

Specifications
- Mass: 4.8 kg (10.58 lb)
- Length: 1,130 mm (44.5 in)
- Barrel length: 500 mm (19.7 in)
- Cartridge: 9×19mm Parabellum
- Action: Blowback, open bolt
- Rate of fire: 450-500 rounds/min
- Effective firing range: 100 m
- Maximum firing range: 1000 m
- Feed system: 20, 25, or 32 round box magazine
- Sights: Front inverted V blade, rear V notch.

The Maschinenkarabiner (M. K.) 36 is a prototype German 9mm submachine gun developed by Hugo Schmeisser.

== Overview ==
The M.K. 36 represents one of the early attempts to build a submachine gun for widespread issue to infantry troops. M.K. 36s feature a full-length rifle-style furniture, provisions to mount the standard S84/98 bayonet, and tangent leaf sights that go out to 1 km. They have considerably longer barrels than most contemporary submachine guns in an attempt to increase the effective range by boosting muzzle velocity.

The M.K. 36 operates on the blowback operating system and fires from the open bolt. It has a fire selector that allows the operator to choose between semi-automatic and fully automatic firing modes. The fire selector and control mechanisms were largely derived from the earlier MP 28, II. Oddly, the M.K. 36 features a bolt safety, the bolt cannot be cocked without a magazine inserted.

There is photographic evidence of three variants of the M.K. 36: the M.K. 36, III, the M.K. 36, II, and the M.K. 36, II made for Hungarian trials. The variants differ in the type of rifle furniture they mount, bayonet lug configuration, caliber, and the position of the charging handle. The original M.K. 36, II is chambered in 9×19mm Parabellum, has a left-side charging handle and a standard German bayonet mount and markings behind the rear right sight. The Hungarian trials M.K. 36, II is chambered in 9×25mm Mauser and features a stacking rod, a different bayonet mount meant for the Hungarian M35 bayonet, and a right-side charging handle. It is marked in front of the ejection port. The M.K. 36, III returns to 9×19mm, has the standard German bayonet mount, and a right-side charging handle. It is marked in front of the ejection port.

== Bolt design ==
The design of the recoil spring and bolt was the most controversial and influential aspect of the M.K. 36, III. The design consisted of a series of nested cylinders with the recoil spring inside, with the firing pin affixed to the front of the end cylinder. Another cylinder with the bolt head and charging handle was placed on top of the recoil-spring assembly. This design is almost identical to the design used in the MP38 and MP40 submachine guns that saw widespread use.

However, the competing EMP36 submachine gun by Erma Werke used a similar bolt structure that also involved a telescoping spring. Heinrich Vollmer, a competing designer who designed the EMP36, held the patent for telescoping springs of the type, so production of the M.K. 36, III was halted due to patent infringement. Despite Vollmer's patent, the bolt design on the MP38 resembles the M.K. 36 III far more than the EMP36.
