= MG 34 =

German general-purpose machine gun

Maschinengewehr 34
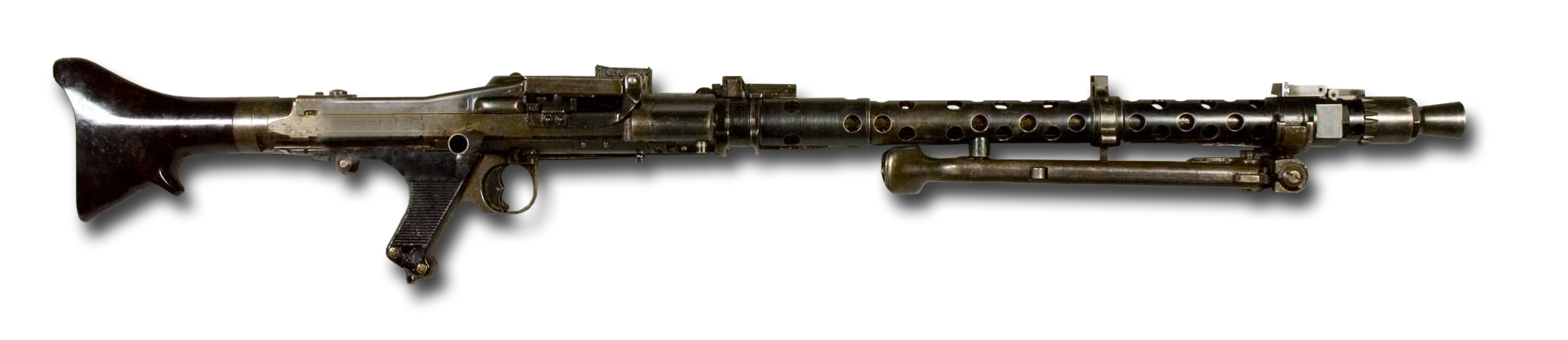
- MG 34 in the Swedish Army Museum.
- Type: General-purpose machine gun
- Place of origin: Nazi Germany

Service history
- In service: 1936–1945 (Wehrmacht service); 1936–present (other militaries)
- Used by: See Users
- Wars: 1936–1939 revolt in Palestine; Spanish Civil War; World War II; Guerrilla war in the Baltic states Greek Civil War; Chinese Civil War; First Indochina War; 1948 Arab–Israeli war Korean War; Portuguese Colonial Wars; Algerian War; Cuban Revolution; Suez Crisis; Biafran War; Vietnam War; Rhodesian Bush War; Angolan Civil War; Six-Day War; Yugoslav Wars; Syrian Civil War; Russo-Ukrainian War

Production history
- Designer: Heinrich Vollmer
- Designed: 1934
- Manufacturer: Rheinmetall-Borsig AG Soemmerda; Mauserwerke AG; Steyr-Daimler-Puch AG; Waffenwerke Brünn
- Unit cost: 312 ℛ︁ℳ︁ (1944); 1260 EUR current equivalent
- Produced: 1935–1945
- No. built: 577,120

Specifications
- Mass: 12.1 kg (26.7 lb); 32 kg (70.5 lb) (with tripod)
- Length: 1,219 mm (48.0 in)
- Barrel length: 627 mm (24.7 in)
- Cartridge: 7.92×57mm Mauser
- Action: Recoil-operated, opened rotating bolt
- Rate of fire: 800–900 rounds/min Early versions: 600–1,000 rounds/min selectable on pistol grip MG 34"S": 1,500 rounds/min. MG 34/41: 1,200 rounds/min. Practical: 150 rounds/min
- Muzzle velocity: 765 m/s (2,510 ft/s) (s.S. Patrone)
- Effective firing range: 200–2,000 m (219–2,187 yd) sight adjustments 3,500 m (3,828 yd) with tripod and telescopic sight
- Maximum firing range: 4,700 m (5,140 yd)
- Feed system: 50/250-round Patronengurt 33, 34, or 34/41 model belt, 50-round Gurttrommel 34 drum, or 75-round drum magazine with modification
- Sights: Iron sights, antiaircraft sight or telescopic sights

The MG 34 (short for Maschinengewehr 34, "machine gun 34") is a German recoil-operated, air-cooled machine gun, first tested in 1929, introduced in 1934, and issued to units in 1936. It introduced an entirely new concept in automatic firepower – the Einheitsmaschinengewehr (universal machine gun) – and is generally considered the world's first general-purpose machine gun (GPMG). Both the MG 34 and MG 42 were erroneously nicknamed "Spandau" by Allied troops, a carryover from the World War I nickname for the MG 08, which was produced at the Spandau Arsenal.

The versatile MG 34 was chambered for the fully-powered 7.92×57mm Mauser rifle cartridge and was arguably the most advanced machine gun in the world at the time of its deployment. The MG 34 was envisaged and well-developed to provide portable light and medium machine gun infantry cover, anti-aircraft coverage, and even sniping ability. Its combination of exceptional mobility – being light enough to be carried by one man – and high rate of fire (of up to 900 rounds per minute) was unmatched. It entered service in great numbers from 1939. Nonetheless, the design proved to be rather complex for mass production and was supplemented by the cheaper and simpler MG 42, though both remained in service and production until the end of the war.

== History ==
=== Before World War I ===
Even before World War I, the German military was already looking forward to replacing the heavy machine guns which proved to be such a success in that war. The MG13 was one of the first developments toward a goal of producing a weapon that could perform multiple roles, rather than just one. The MG13 was the result of reengineering the Dreyse Water-cooled machine gun to fit the new requirement. The twin-barreled Gast gun was developed with the goal of providing a high cyclic rate of fire weapon for anti-aircraft use and was reported to have reached cyclic rates of fire as high as 1,600 rounds per minute.

The Einheitsmaschinengewehr concept required that the operator could radically transform the machine gun for several purposes by changing its mount, sights and feed mechanism. One of the Einheitsmaschinengewehr roles was to provide low-level anti-aircraft coverage. A high cyclic rate of fire is advantageous for use against targets that are exposed to a general-purpose machine gun for a limited time span, like aircraft or targets that minimize their exposure time by quickly moving from cover to cover. For targets that can be fired on by a general-purpose machine gun for longer periods than just a few seconds, the cyclic firing rate becomes less important.

=== After World War I ===
After World War I the German military faced restrictions imposed by the Treaty of Versailles. The treaty restricted the German Reichswehr (Realm Defence) to maximally stockpiling 792 heavy (bulky hard-to-maneuver water-cooled) machine guns and 1,134 light machine guns and actual production of machine guns and development of sustained fire weapons were prohibited. From 1933 Nazi Germany was committed to repudiating the Treaty of Versailles and its restrictions. As part of a (clandestine) military revitalization program the German military sought avenues to get around restrictions imposed by the treaty by resorting to innovative weapon design and engineering, German arms designers working abroad and other foreign assistance.

=== Development of the MG 34 ===
In 1932 the Reichswehrministerium (Ministry of the Reichswehr) ordered several companies, including Rheinmetall, to develop a new Einheitsmaschinengewehr (Universal machine gun) to replace several role specific machine guns then in German use. The following specifications for the gun were set:

- light weight
- simplified operation
- quick-change barrel
- single-shot capability as well as two (fast and slower) cyclic rates

The MG 34 was based on a 1930 Rheinmetall design under the direction of Louis Stange at Rheinmetall's Sömmerda office, the MG 30. The Swiss and Austrian militaries had both licensed and produced the MG 30 from Rheinmetall shortly after it was patented and the gun started to enter service in Switzerland. The technical challenges in meeting the Reichswehrministerium specifications were broader than the gun development itself. It also encompassed various mounts and other accessories that had to adapt that gun to different roles. The MG 30 design was adapted and modified by Heinrich Vollmer of Mauser Industries. Vollmer originally designed the feed mechanism to accept MG 13/MG 15 inspired 75-round Patronentrommel 34 spring-loaded saddle-drum magazines. The Patronentrommel 34 was a rather complex magazine for which a filling device had to be used and requiring ordnance personnel and a special tool to optimize the spring tension for reliable feeding. Users were ordered not to adjust the drum spring tension. The result, the multiple role capable MG 34, wherein Rheinmetall's Sömmerda plant had a significant influence, reflected the Reichswehrministerium specifications.

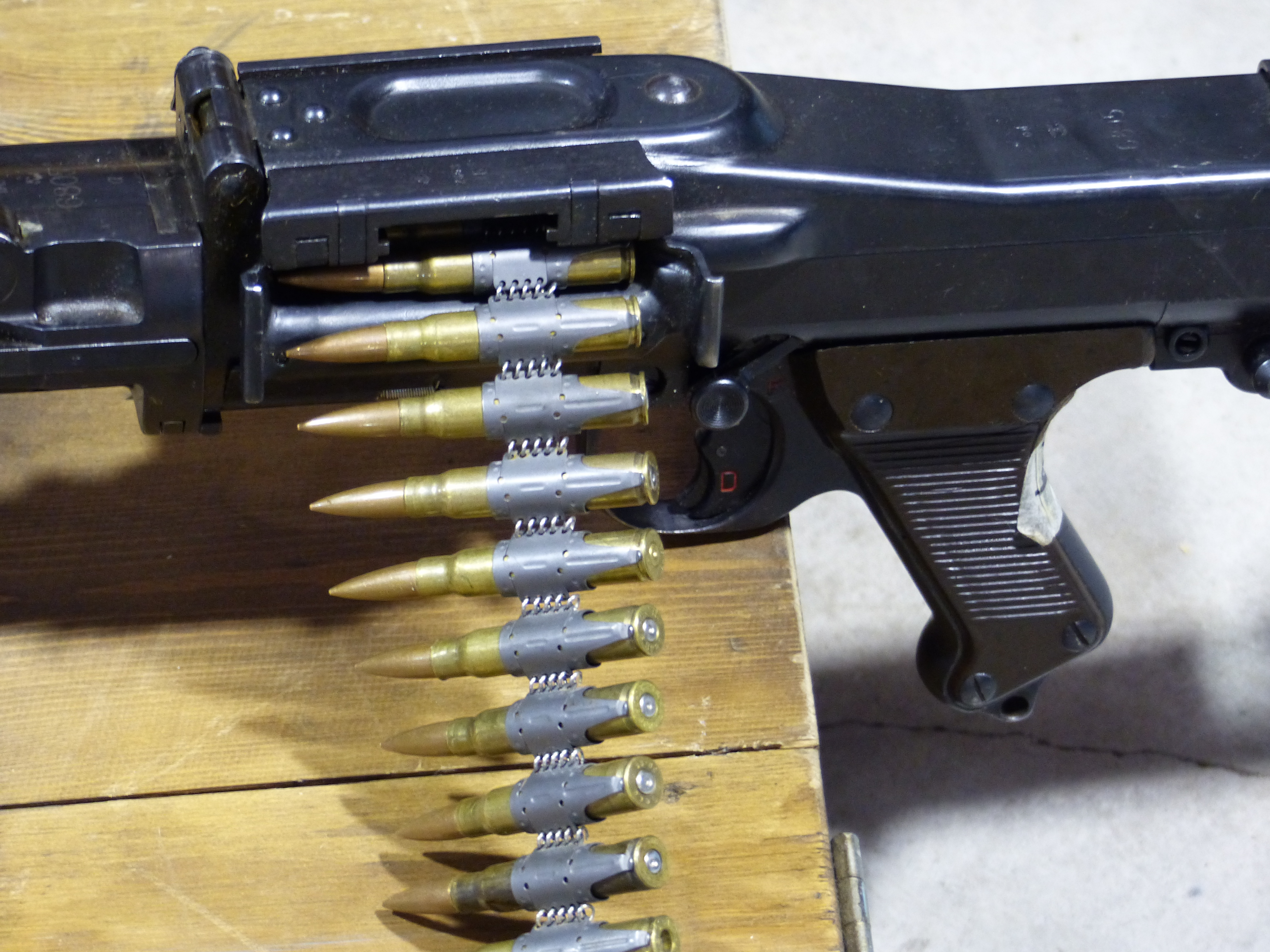
MG 42 with inserted Gurt 34 reusable non-disintegrating metal ammunition belt

In 1937 the feed was redesigned to use reusable non-disintegrating Gurt 33 and Gurt 34 metal belts and a 50-round Gurttrommel 34 (belt drum). The feeding system was based on the direct push-through of the cartridge out of the link into the gun's chamber. Accordingly, the link had to be of the half-open type to enable the motion of the bolt through the link. Vollmer also increased the rate of fire. The MG 34's double crescent trigger dictated either semiautomatic or fully automatic firing modes. The capability to use the previous 75-round Patronentrommel 34 saddle-drum magazines (with a required change of the feed cover for a Trommelhalter magazine holder) was retained.

As the MG 34 was technically based on and featured design elements of several other machine guns, the German arms industry under the guidance of the Waffenamt (German Army Weapons Agency) negotiated and worked out complex royalties and patents matters regarding the MG 34 to every involved side's satisfaction.

Before large scale production commenced, 2,300 MG 34s in two main early versions, slightly more complex and different from the final design, were produced between 1935 and 1939. At the time it was introduced, it had a number of advanced features and the general-purpose machine gun concept that it aspired to was an influential one. A little-known feature of these first 2,300 weapons was a device that could be used to change the rate of fire of the weapon. This cadence regulator, which was designed as a flick-force brake, was located in the grip of the weapon. The designer of the MG 34, Louis Stange, was granted the corresponding patent (No. 686 843) at the end of 1939.

During the period between 1934 and the adoption of the final version the Waffenamt realized the MG 34 Einheitsmaschinengewehr was too complex and expensive to mass-produce and started looking for ways to simplify and rationalize the technical concept. In 1937, the Waffenamt requested three companies to submit new more economical Einheitsmaschinengewehr designs.

=== Adoption of the MG 34 and next Einheitsmaschinengewehr generation ===
The final version of the MG 34 was eventually adopted for main service on 24 January 1939. The MG 34 was the mainstay of German Army support weapons from the time of its first pre large scale production issue in 1935 until 1942, when it was supplanted by the next Einheitsmaschinengewehr generation Maschinengewehr 42 or MG 42. Although the MG 34 was reliable when competently maintained, it was sensitive to extreme weather conditions, dirt, and mud. Its dissemination throughout the German forces was hampered due to its elaborately milled precision engineering with tight tolerances and use of high-quality metal alloys, which resulted in high machine time, skilled labor requirements, production costs and a relatively slow rate of production. MG 34 production during the war amounted to over 350,000 units (12,822 units in 1939, 54,826 in 1940, 80,952 in 1941, 63,163 in 1942, 48,802 in 1943, 61,396 in 1944, and 20,297 in 1945). Attempts to incrementally improve the fundamental drawbacks of the basic MG 34 design failed. For its successor, the faster firing, less complex, sensitive and cheaper MG 42, the Germans instead used mass production techniques similar to those that created the MP 40 submachine gun. In 1943, MG 42 production surpassed MG 34 production and continued to do so until the end of the war. The Germans nevertheless continued widespread production of MG 34s in parallel until the end of the war.

== Combat use ==
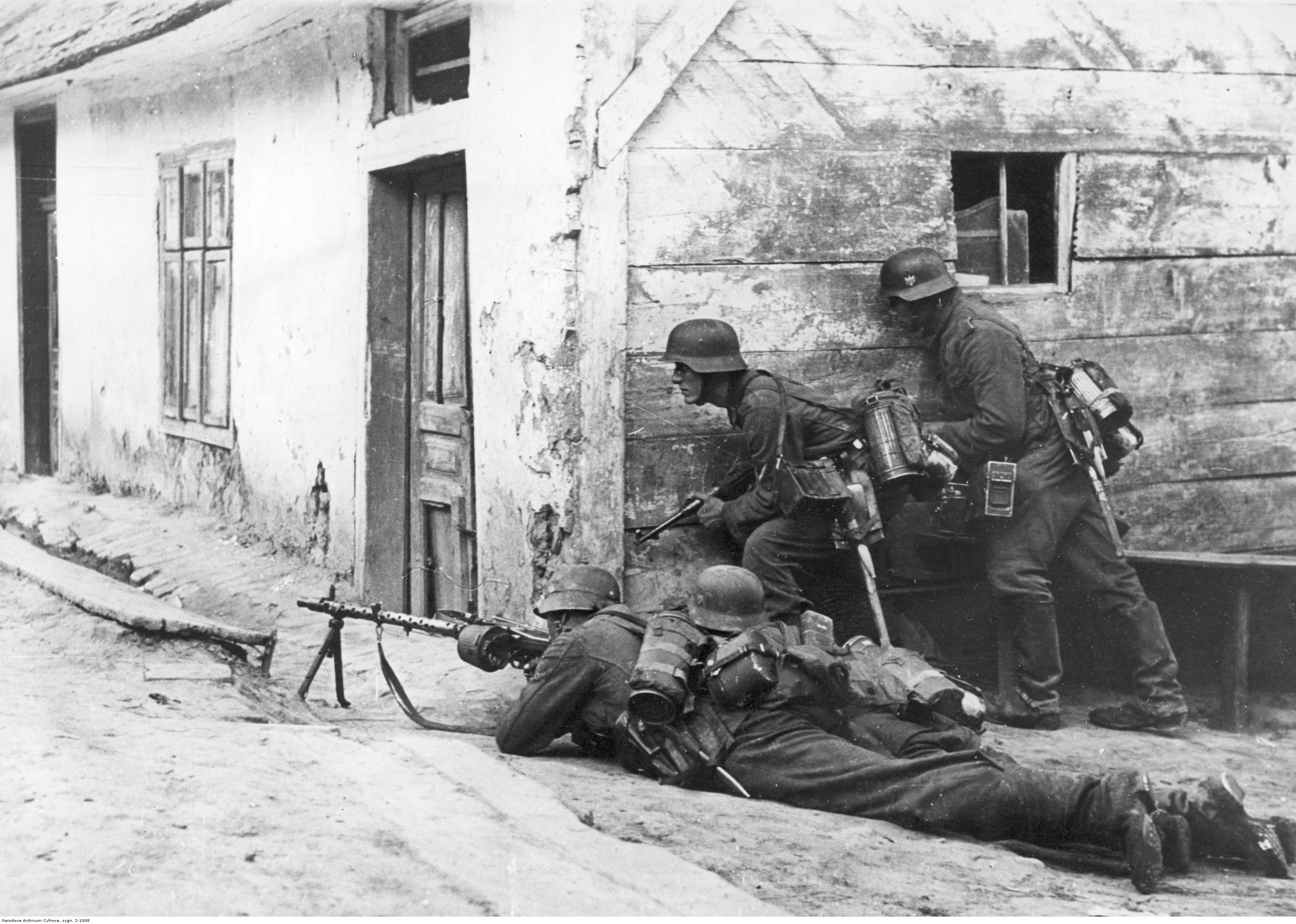
German soldiers with an MG 34 using a 50-round Gurttrommel

In the field, the weapon could operate in offensive or defensive applications. The offensive model, with a mobile soldier, used either a 50-round Gurttrommel or a 75-round Patronentrommel 34. In a stationary defensive role, the gun was mounted on a bipod or tripod and fed by a non-disintegrating metal ammunition belt. Belts were carried in boxes of five. Each belt contained 50 rounds. Belt lengths could be linked for sustained fire. During sustained fire, barrels would have to be changed at intervals due to the heat generated by the rapid rate of fire. If the barrels were not changed properly, the weapon would misfire. Changing barrels was a rapid process for the trained operator and involved disengaging a latch and swinging the receiver to the right for the insertion of a new barrel into the barrel shroud. Accordingly, stationary defensive positions required more than one operator. The weapon was cocked by a non-reciprocating charging handle located at the bottom right of the receiver.

=== Europe ===
The MG 34 was used as the primary infantry machine gun, and remained as the primary armored vehicle defensive weapon as it took limited space to change barrels inside a vehicle. The MG 34 was intended to replace the MG 13 and other older machine guns, but these were still being used in World War II as demand was never met. It was intended to be replaced in infantry service by the MG 42, but there were never enough MG 42s, and MG 34s continued to be used in all roles until the end of World War II.

It was the standard machine gun of the Kriegsmarine (German Navy) and was also used as a secondary weapon on most German tanks and other armoured vehicles used during World War II.

=== East Asia ===
MG 34s captured by the British and Soviet armies were sent to both Chinese Nationalist and Chinese Communist forces during World War II and the Chinese Civil War. The French army sent captured MG 34s to Indochina during the Indochina War. Some models captured from the Germans by the Soviets or manufactured in Czechoslovakia post-WWII were supplied to the People's Liberation Army/People's Volunteer Army, PAVN and the Viet Cong during the Cold War. Several hundred more MG 34s that were in use with these groups were taken from either French or other Western nations fielding captured German weapons fighting against them in colonial wars or anti-communist conflicts.

== Small arms doctrine ==
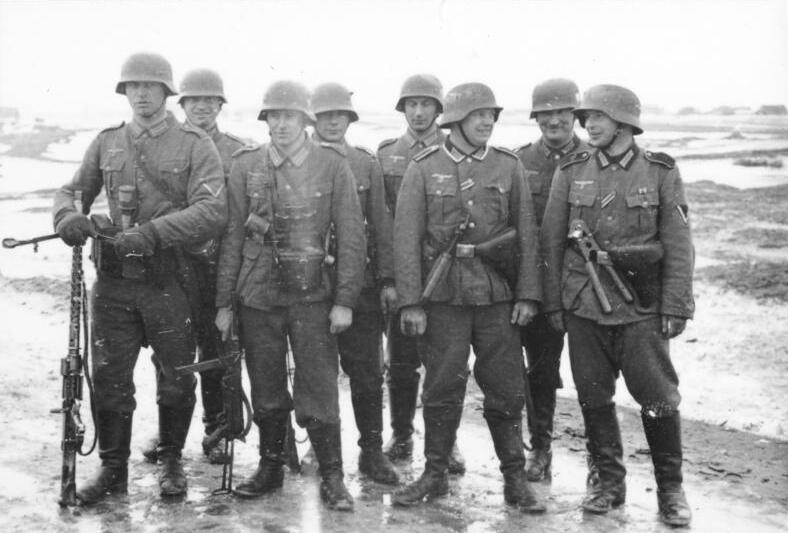
A Wehrmacht infantry squad with the MG 34 in the light machine gun role

The German tactical infantry doctrine of the era based a (10-man Gruppe) squad's firepower on the general-purpose machine gun in the light machine gun role. The advantage of the general purpose machine gun concept was that it added greatly to the overall volume of fire that could be put out by a squad-sized unit. It was possible for operating crews to lay down a non-stop barrage of fire, pausing only when the barrel had to be replaced. This allowed the MG 34 to tie up significantly larger numbers of enemy troops than was otherwise possible. The Americans and the British trained their troops to take cover from the fire of an MG 34, and assault the position during the small time window of barrel replacement.

The German military instructed that sustained cyclic rate fire must be avoided at all costs. In the bipod-mounted light machine gun role, MG 34 users were trained to fire short bursts and strive to optimize their aim between bursts fired in succession. According to comparative tests by the US military under battle conditions, 7 to 10 rounds bursts with 15 bursts in a minute were most effective. For its medium machine gun role, the MG 34 was matched to the newly developed Lafette 34 tripod. In the tripod-mounted medium machine gun role, general-purpose machine gun users were trained to fire short bursts and bursts of 20 to 50 rounds and strive to optimize their aim between bursts fired in succession. As a consequence of factors like the time spent reloading, aiming, changing hot barrels if necessary to allow for cooling, the MG 34's practical effective rate of fire was 150 rounds per minute.

The Allied nations' infantry doctrines of World War II based a squad's/rifle section's firepower centered on the rifleman and/or a magazine fed light machine gun (BAR, Bren, DP-27/DPM, FM 24/29), and they utilised weapons with cyclic fire rates of typically 450–600 rounds per minute.

=== Light machine gun fire support role ===
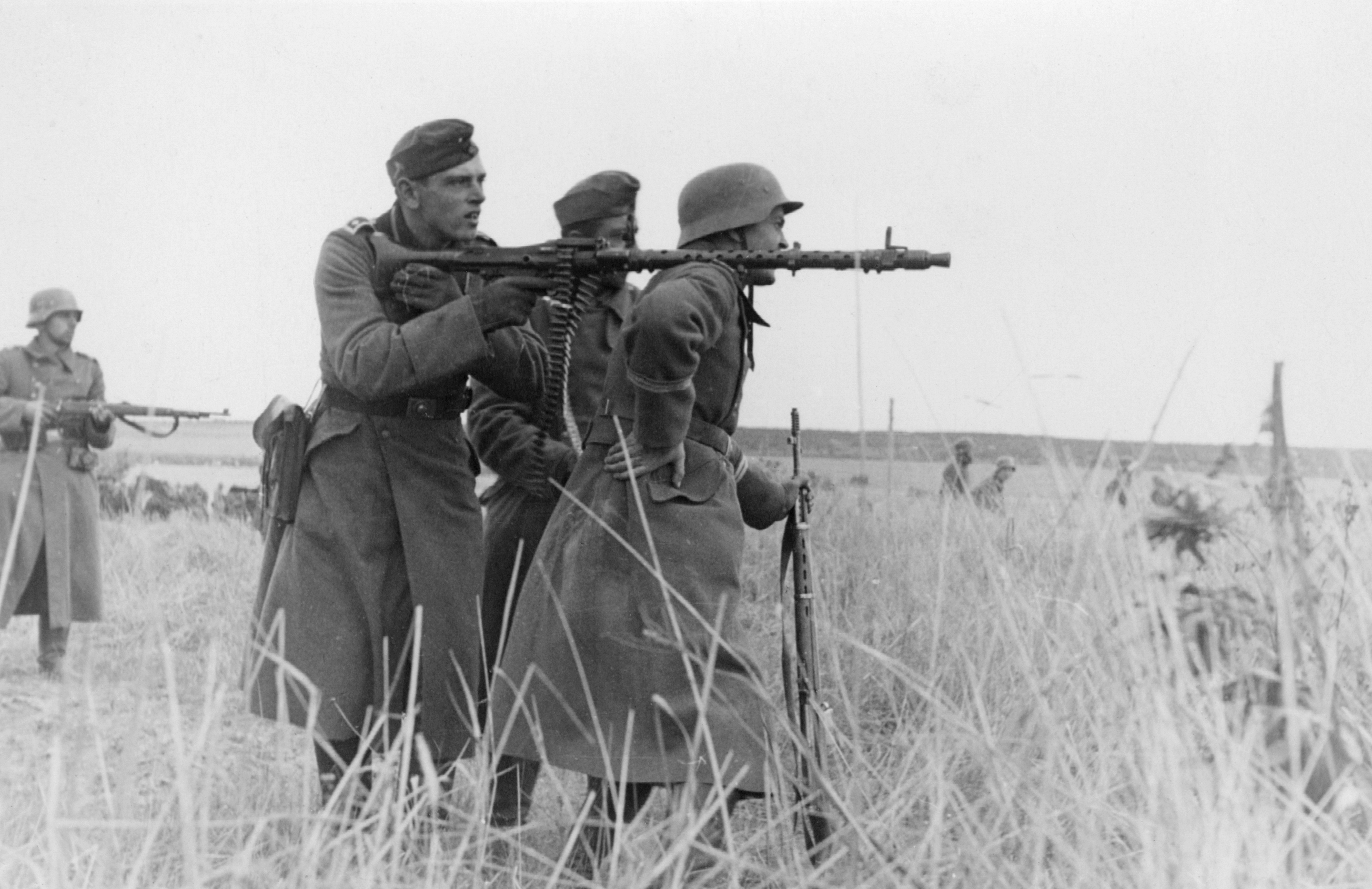
Machine gun team with MG34 at the Eastern Front

A German infantry Gruppe (squad) at the start of the war consisted of ten men: a non-commissioned officer or Unteroffizier squad leader, deputy squad leader, a three-man machine gun team (machine gunner, assistant gunner/loader and ammunition carrier) and five riflemen. The riflemen carried additional ammunition for the machine gun, hand grenades, explosive charges or a machine gun tripod as required and provided security and covering fire for the machine gun team. A full Gruppe (squad) carried 1,800 rounds of ammunition for the machine gun between them.

=== Medium machine gun fire support role ===
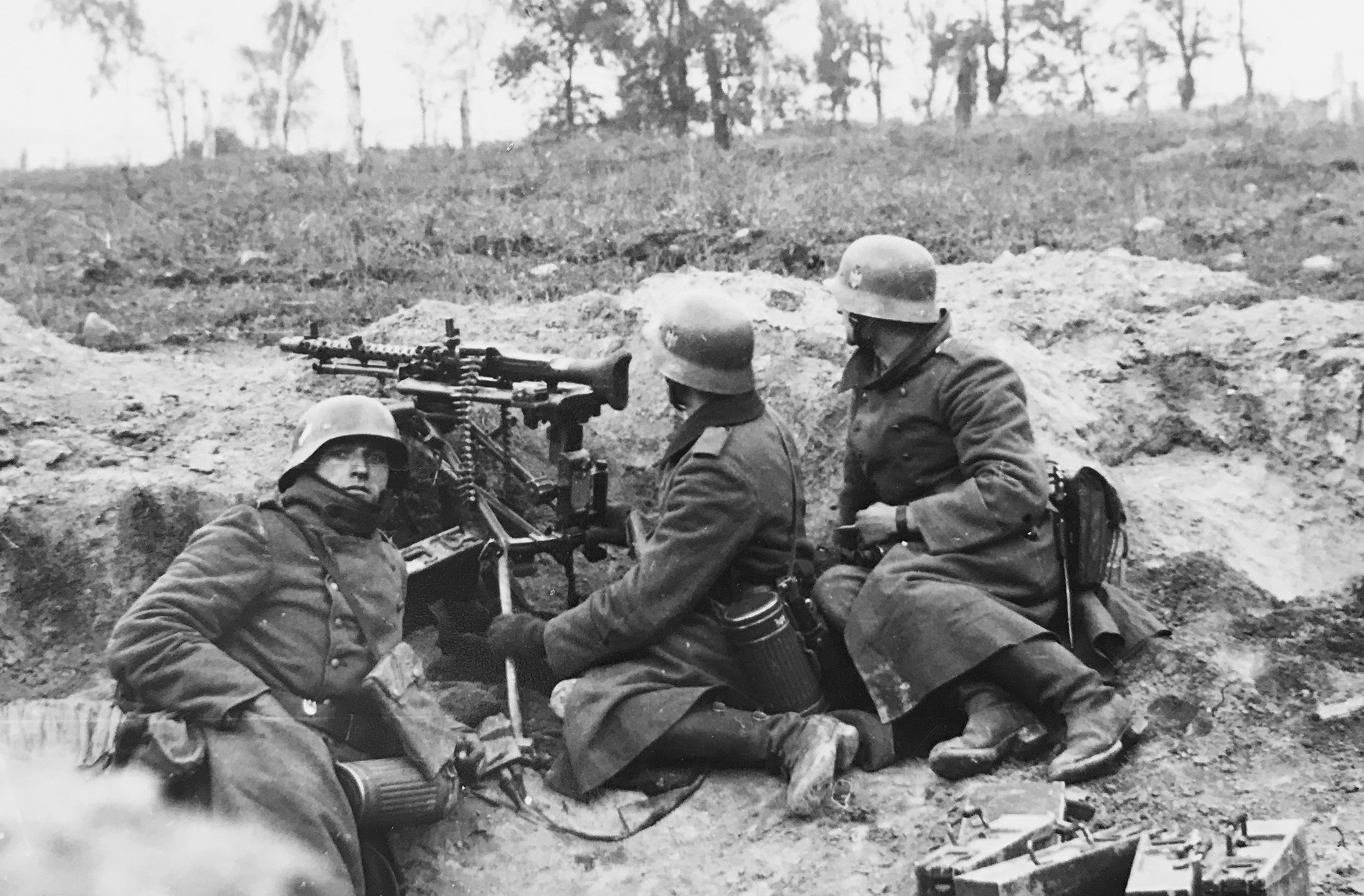
MG 34 general-purpose machine gun mounted on a Lafette 34 tripod

In the German heavy machine gun (HMG) platoons, each platoon served four MG 34/MG 42 machine guns, used in the sustained fire mode mounted on tripods. In 1944, this was altered to six machine guns in three sections with two seven-man heavy machine gun squads per section as follows:

- Squad leader (NCO) MP40
- Machine gunner (private) MG 34/MG 42 and Walther P38
- Assistant gunner (private) pistol
- Three riflemen (privates) rifles
- Horse leader for horse, cart and trailer (private) rifle

The optimum operating crew of an MG 34 in its medium machine gun role was six men: the squad leader, the machine gunner who carried and fired the gun, the assistant gunner/loader who carried the tripod, and three riflemen who carried 1,800 rounds of ammunition between them, spare barrels, entrenching tools, and other items.

To enable the machine gun for its long-range direct fire and indirect fire support roles, optical sights could be added to a Zielfernrohrhalter (optical sight mounting bracket) on the tripod, allowing operating crews to continue using advanced planned and unplanned firing methods developed during World War I, though plunging fire or indirect fire methods were not as commonly used by machine gunners during World War II as they were during World War I.

== Design details ==
=== Operating system ===
The MG 34 fires from an open bolt and this format both keeps the barrel open at both ends after firing ceases, allowing airflow through it and helping it to cool faster, and meanwhile retains the next unfired bullet outside the chamber until the trigger is squeezed again; and thus the cartridges are protected from the risk of cook-offs from high chamber temperatures after long bouts of sustained automatic fire. The firearm was designed with a rotating bolt operated by short recoil aided by a muzzle booster. When the firearm is ready to fire the bolt is pulled back to the rear and is held back by the sear. With the pull of the trigger the sear disengages sending the bolt forward under pressure from the recoil spring. A cartridge is stripped from the magazine or belt and the round is pushed into the chamber. As the bolt moves forward into battery the bolt rotates engaging the locking lugs and chamber locking the bolt to the barrel. The striker strikes and ignites the primer and the round is fired. The recoil causes the barrel and bolt to move backwards a short distance. The rearward movement of the barrel causes the rotating bolt to rotate back disengaging the locking lugs and unlocking the bolt from the barrel. The barrel returns to its forward position while the bolt recoils to its rear position. The spent cartridge case is ejected downward through an ejection port normally covered by a spring-loaded dust cover at the bottom of the receiver, just in front of the trigger group and the cycle can begin anew. The spring-loaded dust cover automatically opens when the gun is fired, but the user has to close it after firing to prevent dirt entering the receiver through the open port.

=== Sights ===
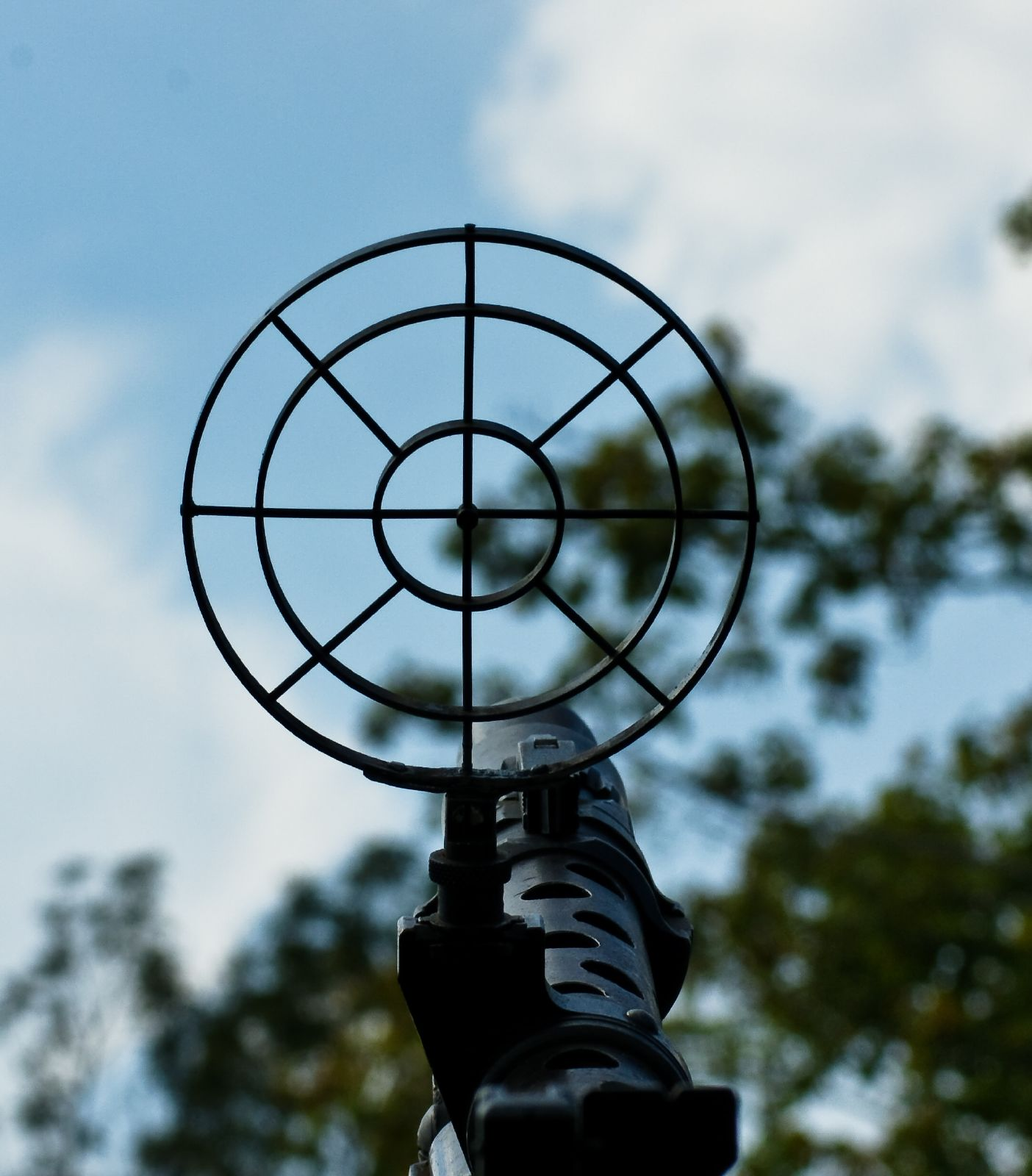
Spiderweb-type anti-aircraft sight to enable the MG 34 for its low level anti-aircraft defense role

The MG 34 came with a standard iron sight line consisting of a notched 'V' sight mounted to a post in the rear and a single blade at the front. The sight came calibrated for ranges between 200 and 2,000 m (219 and 2,187 yd) in 100 m (109 yd) meter increments. The standard sight line had a 530 millimeters (20.9 in) sight radius.

The MG 34 could accept a variety of different sighting systems, such as a spider web-type anti-aircraft sight or telescopic sights for use in specialty roles.

An active infrared device, intended primarily for night use, and consisting of a specialized mount, active 300 millimeters (11.8 in) infrared spotlight and accompanying infrared image converter was developed that could be used with the MG 34 and MG 42. In the later stages of World War II the bulky Fahr- und Zielgerät FG 1250 (driving and aiming device FG 1250) active infrared unit was paired on Sd.Kfz. 251/1 Falke half-track armored personnel carriers to some MG 34 and MG 42 machine guns.

=== Feeding ===
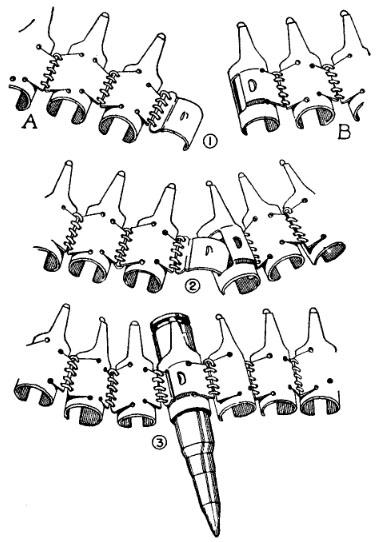
Method of joining German non-disintegrating metallic-link ammunition machine gun belts

The MG 34 could use non-disintegrating metallic-link belts, which have links that wrap around the cartridge case and are linked by a coiling wire on each side. The belts are intended for multiple reuse. Operation through the feed block is in one step by a feed arm housed in the feed cover. According to U.S. Ordnance Department tests, performed in 1942, the MG 34 was capable of lifting 75 rounds of belted ammunition during firing. The feeding system was based on the direct push-through of the cartridge out of the link into the gun's chamber. Accordingly, the link had to be of the half-open type to enable the motion of the bolt through the link. During World War II the Gurt 34/41-belt family was introduced. Gurt 34/41 belt links and wire spirals were made of thinner material — the Gurt 34 links were made of 0.7 mm (0.028 in) and Gurt 34/41 links of 0.5 mm (0.020 in) thick stamped steel sheet metal — that saved ⅓ of metal and counterintuitively yielded improved performance. Belts were supplied in a fixed length of 50 rounds, but could be linked up to make longer belts for sustained firing. Ammunition boxes contained 250 rounds in five 50-round belts. A 250-round Patronengurt 33 belt was also issued to machine guns installed in fixed emplacements such as bunkers. Patronenkasten 34 and Patronenkasten 41 ammunition boxes could hold up to 300 belted rounds. The Patronenkasten could contain an Einführstück belt starter-segment.
The 50-round Gurttrommel assault drum designed to be clipped to the left side of the gun was an alternative feed option. It was not a true magazine but held a coiled 50-round belt and corresponding Einführstück starter-segment preventing it from snagging, twisting and getting stuck during mobile assaults. The Gurttrommel belt container was commonly used until the end of World War II, with the MG 34 and MG 42.
The 75-round Patronentrommel 34 "double drum" magazine was the original pre-redesign feed method. This double drum or saddle magazine type was introduced on the MG 13, but the MG 13 magazine and Patronentrommel 34 were not interchangeable. After the MG 34 redesign, that enabled the MG 34 to use belted ammunition, the Patronentrommel 34 became a rare alternative feed option. The Patronentrommel 34 could be used only together with a Trommelhalter magazine holder that substituted the normal feed cover, thereby switching the gun from belt feeding to Patronentrommel 34 "double drum" magazine feeding. It contained 75 loose rounds in two spring-powered spirals twisting in opposite direction, feeding the chamber from opposite sides in turn. The Patronentrommel 34 was rather complicated and inconvenient to (re)load, adjust to work reliably, and in use. It had to be loaded by a special Trommelfüller 34 drum filler machine. This drum filler machine could be stored and carried in a Patronenkasten 34 ammunition box. An MG 34 configured to use the 75-round magazine could not be returned to belt-feed mode without substituting the Trommelhalter magazine holder for the normal feed cover. By the end of 1938 the Patronentrommel 34 and its accessories were officially withdrawn. This induced that Patronentrommel 34 use by infantry had ceased by 1941, with some mainly in the low level anti-aircraft role remaining in use on armoured vehicles. The MG 34 tended to fire at a somewhat higher cyclic rate when fed by a 75-round Patronentrommel 34 than when fed by a standard belt, due to the spring loading of the former.

=== Barrel ===
The barrel of the MG 34 could be quickly changed to avoid overheating during sustained fire by the machine gun crew and weighed 2 kg (4.4 lb). The service life of an MG 34 barrel was about 6,000 rounds assuming the barrel was used according to the regulations, which prohibited rapid or sustained fire beyond 250 rounds. In cases of emergency the rapid rate of a barrel was limited to 400 rounds. During a barrel change, the operator would disengage a latch on the left side of the receiver which held the receiver to the barrel sleeve. The entire receiver section could then pivot off to the right on its latitudinal axis, allowing the operator to pull the (hot) barrel out the back of the sleeve. A new cool(er) barrel would then be put in the back of the sleeve, and the receiver rotated back in line with the barrel sleeve and latched. The machine gun crew member responsible for a hot barrel change was issued protective asbestos mitts to prevent burns to the hands. The entire process took 10 to 15 seconds when performed by a well-trained crew, causing minimal downtime in battle.

For carrying and protecting spare barrel units, consisting of a barrel and its locking piece, a Laufschützer 34 (barrel protector) was used as a field accessory. When closed the Laufschützer 34 looked like a tubular container with mountings at its ends to attach a carrying/shoulder strap. During a barrel change a cool MG 34 barrel unit coming out of the Laufschützer 34 can be inserted in the machine gun and the replaced hot barrel unit can be placed in or on the opened Laufschützer 34 to cool down. Later in the war the universal Laufschützer 43 was introduced that could be used with MG 34 and MG 42 barrel units.

=== Trigger ===
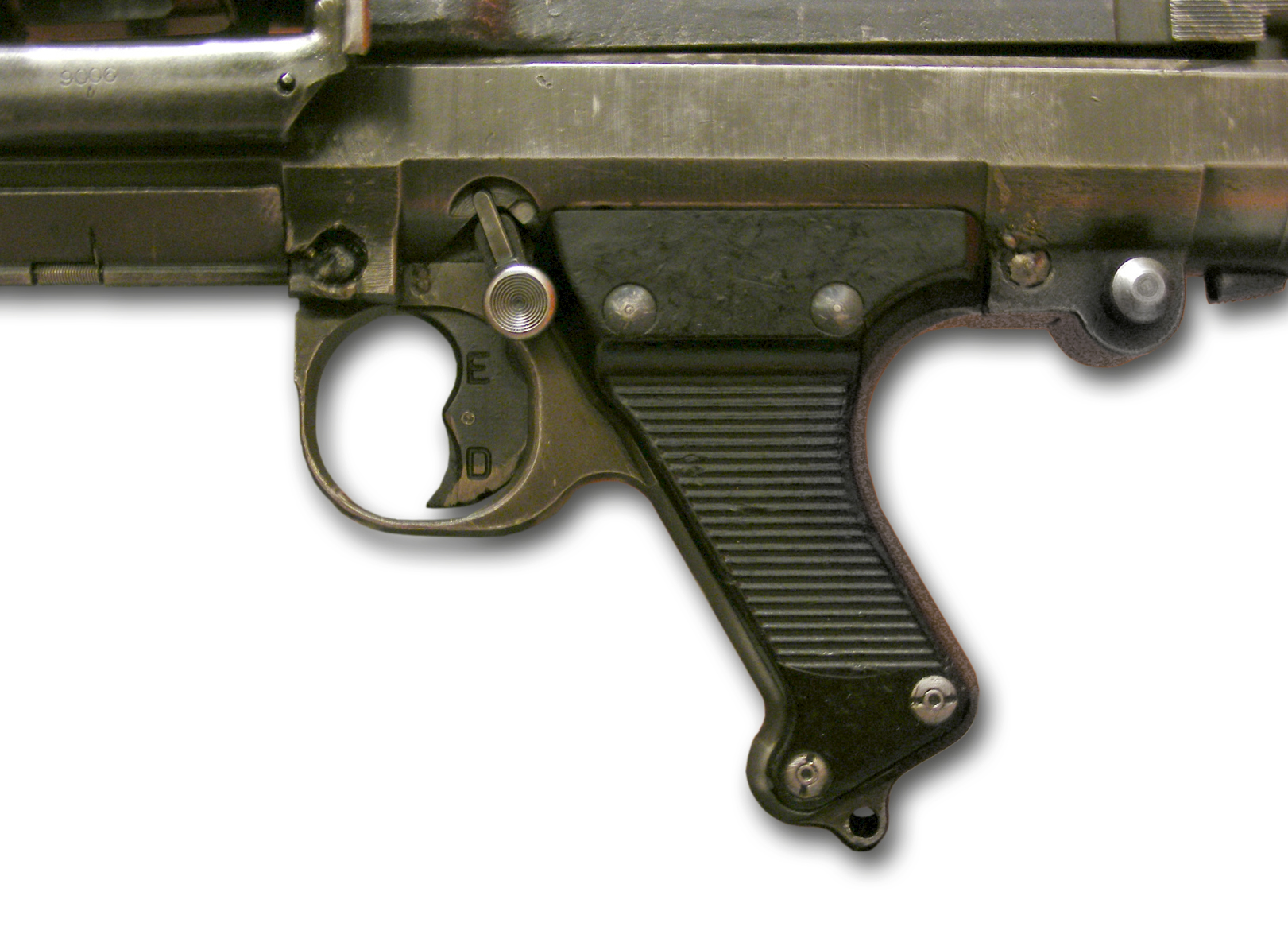
MG 34 double-crescent trigger, E= "Einzelfeuer," semi-automatic fire; D= "Dauerfeuer," full automatic fire

A notable feature of the MG 34 was its double-crescent trigger, which provided select fire capability without the need for a fire mode selector switch. Pressing the upper segment of the trigger produced semi-automatic fire, while holding the lower segment of the trigger produced fully automatic fire. Though considered innovative at the time, the feature was eliminated due to its complexity on the MG 34's successor, the MG 42. The lower section has a restrictor built in the trigger allowing it to be pulled further back if pressed by the user. The safety switch has a secure double safety requiring the user to push in the notch and sliding over until it locks in place in safe/fire modes. Trigger groups on examples used on the eastern front used aluminium grip panels as bakelite tended to crack in the cold.

In the light machine gun role, it was used with a bipod and weighed only 12.1 kg (26.7 lb). In the medium machine gun role, it could be mounted on one of two tripods, a smaller one weighing 6.75 kg (14.9 lb), the larger Lafette 34 23.6 kg (52.0 lb).

=== Lafette 34 tripod ===
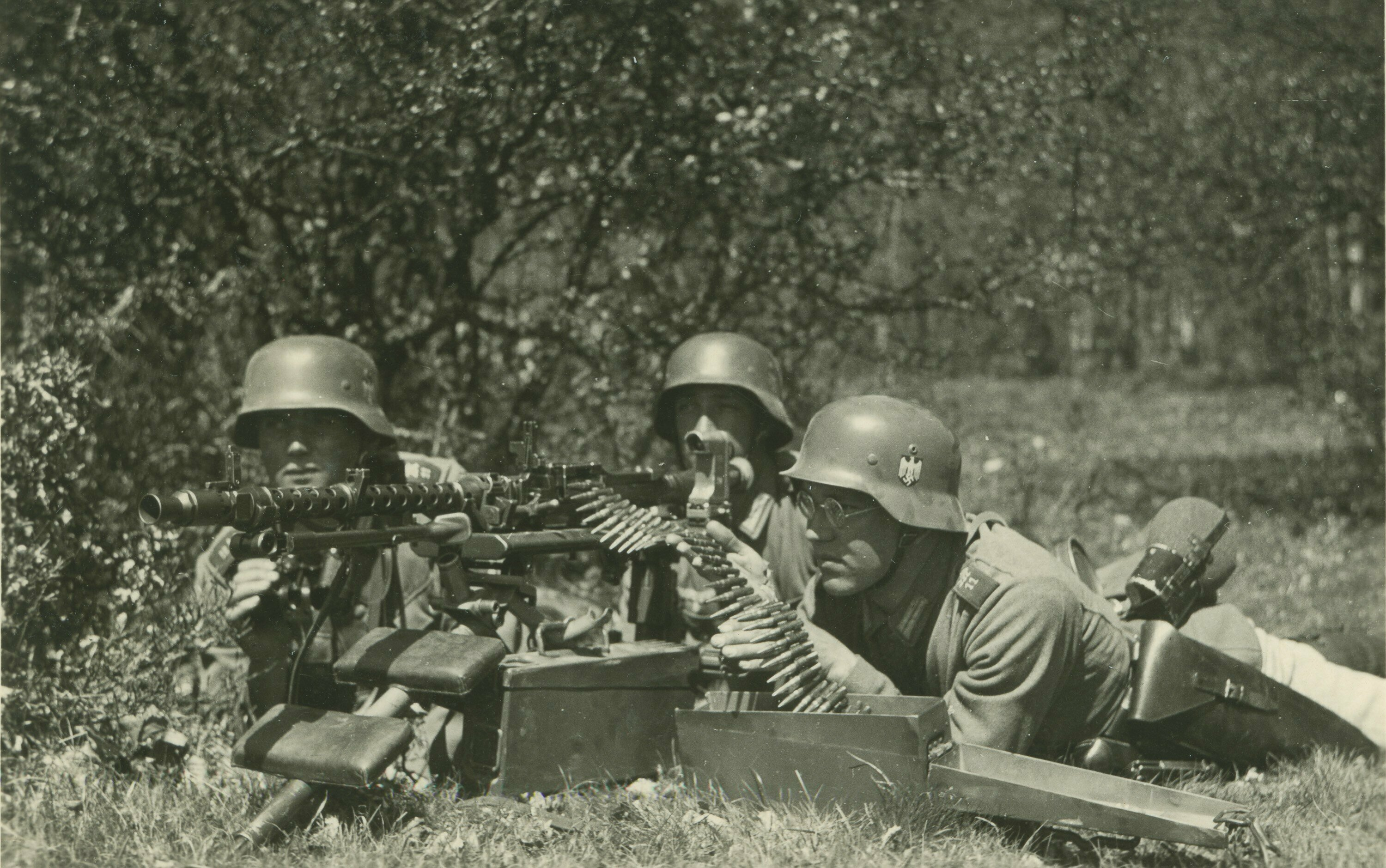
MG 34 mounted on a Lafette 34 tripod with MG Z 34 4× telescopic sight

For the medium machine gun role a larger tripod, the MG 34 Lafette 34, included a number of features, such as recoil absorbing buffer springs, a Zielfernrohrhalter (optical sight mounting bracket) for mounting an MG Z 34 or MG Z 40 periscope-type 4× power telescopic sight containing special sighting equipment for indirect fire or the late World War II MG Z 44, designed for direct fire only. Fitting such an optical sight enabled the machine gun to deliver direct fire out to 3,000 m (3,281 yd). An accessory to lengthen these sights' periscope was available, allowing the use of them behind cover. The Lafette could be set up in a prone, kneeling or a high position and weighed 20 kg (44.1 lb) on its own. The legs could be extended with a Lafetteaufsatzstück to allow it to be used in the low level anti-aircraft role, and when lowered, it could be placed to allow the gun to be fired "remotely" while it swept an arc in front of the mounting with fire. Mounted to the Lafette and aimed through the MG Z 34 or MG Z 40 telescopic sight the effective range of the MG 34 could be extended out to 3,500 m (3,828 yd) when fired indirectly. The indirect firing method exploits the s.S. Patrone useful maximum range, that is defined by the maximum range of a small-arms projectile while still maintaining the minimum kinetic energy required to put unprotected personnel out of action, which is generally believed to be 15 kilogram-meters (147 J / 108 ft⋅lbf). The Lafette 34 tripod also had a bolt box to store a (spare) bolt.

Another unique feature of German World War II machine guns was the Tiefenfeuerautomat feature on the Lafette 34 tripod. If selected, this feature mechanically controlled the rise and fall of the gun, elevating the gun for five rounds and then depressing it for four rounds. It lengthened the beaten zone by walking the fire in wave like motions up and down the range in a predefined area. The length of the beaten zone could be set on the Tiefenfeuerautomat. E.g., being unsure whether the real distance was 2,000 or 2,300 m (2,187 or 2,515 yd), the gunner could make the mount do an automatic sweep between the elevations for 1,900 to 2,400 m (2,078 to 2,625 yd) and back. This sweeping of a selected beaten zone continued as long as the gun fired. The Lafette 34 had a Richt- und Überschießtafel (Overhead firing table) riveted to the rear body of the searchfire mechanism from the very start of production until the very end of it. In the later stages of World War II ballistic correction directions were added for overshooting friendly forces with S.m.E. – Spitzgeschoß mit Eisenkern (spitzer with iron core) ammunition of which the external ballistic behaviour started to significantly deviate from 1,500 m (1,640 yd) upwards compared to the s.S. Patrone (s.S. ball cartridge). A trigger handle, which enabled the operator to fire the gun without affecting the stability of the gun's point of aim, was attached to the Tiefenfeuerautomat searchfire unit. On the Lafette 34 it could be adjusted for both semi-automatic firing and full-automatic firing mode, although some simplified late-war mounts had the trigger configured for full-automatic firing mode only.

There were numerous other specialist mounts for the MG 34. The Dreibein 34, for example, was a simple high-standing tripod for mounting the gun in anti-aircraft mode. There were also mounts for bicycles, motorcycle sidecars, tanks and armoured vehicles (ball and pintle mounts), fortress positions, boat decks and even assault gliders. MG 34s were mounted in multiple-gun arrangements, particularly on vehicles, for low level anti-aircraft defence.

The stock could be easily removed to reduce the space occupied when mounted inside a vehicle. It was produced in various wood and bakelite versions.

== Variants ==
=== MG 34 based improvement attempts ===
As the first war experiences in the beginning of World War II proved that a higher cyclic fire rate generates more dispersion of the bullets, MG 34 based prototype guns like the MG 34S were requested. The MG 34S had a shortened and lightened barrel, a stiffer multi strands recoil spring and a better recoil booster to increase the rate of fire. The prototype weapons were developed into the very similar further improved MG 34/41, that could cope with a cyclic firing rate of 1,200 rounds per minute, but its components became highly stressed. The effort to simplify the basic MG 34 and reduce production effort and costs consisted mainly of discarding the possibility of semi-automatic fire, using a trigger group containing many stamped parts, and eliminating some complex machining operations during production. Technically, the ejector assembly was enlarged and strengthened, and the feed mechanism was modified to provide a more secure grip on the cartridge. The weight of the MG 34/41 was 14 kg, slightly more than the original MG 34 version. A limited run of MG 34/41 model guns, was completed and tested in combat trials at the Russian front. These guns exhibited durability problems, which is why the development of MG 34 based incrementally improved guns was discontinued. Instead, the German military preferred the technically fundamentally differing also combat trailed MG 39/41 gun. In early 1942 a further improved model of the MG 39/41 was officially accepted and designated as the MG 42.

=== MG 34 Panzerlauf ===
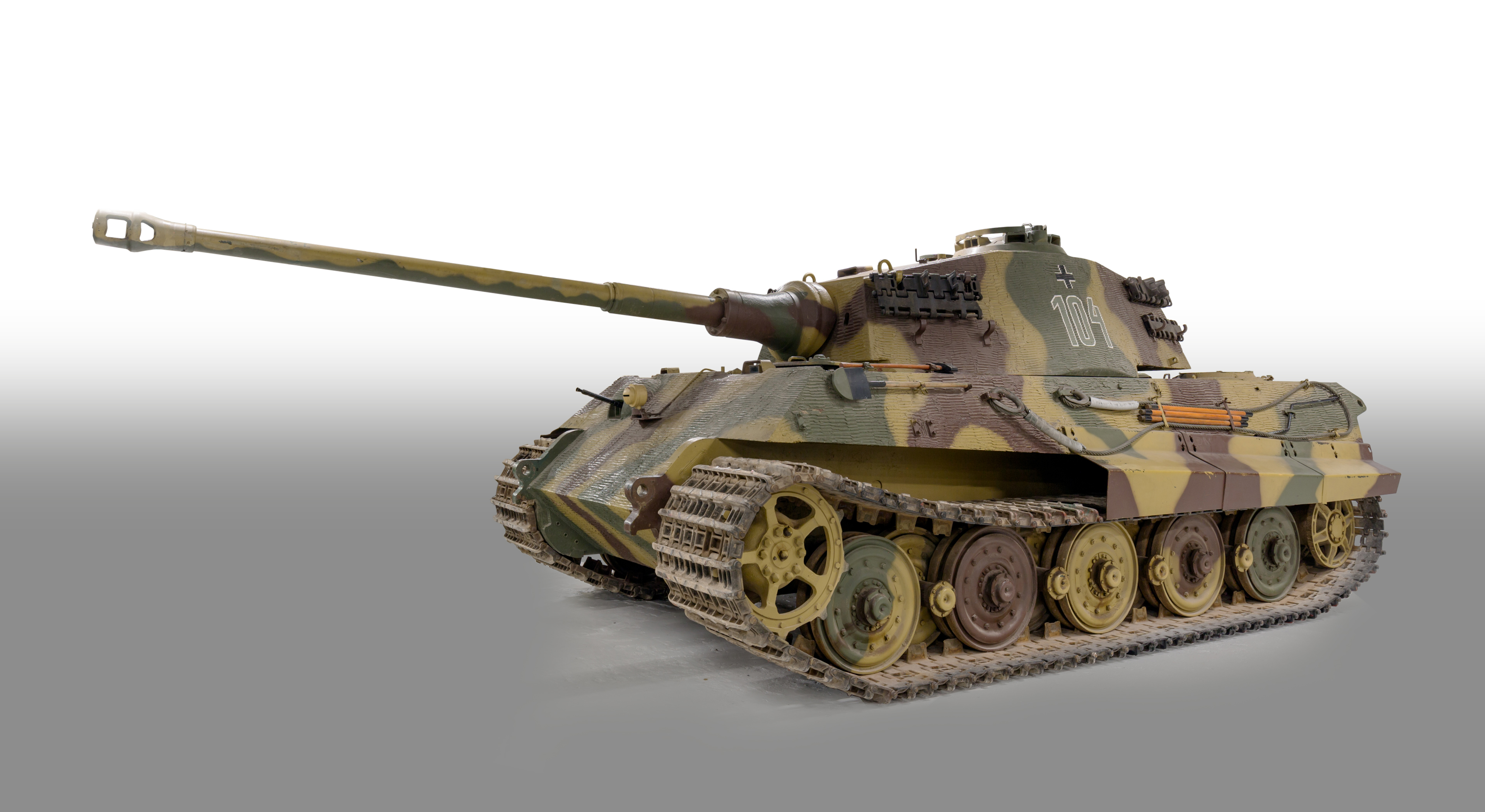
Barrel shroud and recoil booster of an internal Kugelblende (ball mount) mounted MG 34 protruding out of the sloping upper glacis plate of a Tiger II heavy tank

Most German tanks and other armoured vehicles used during World War II used the MG 34 Panzerlauf or MG 34 Panzermantel for secondary armament, the Jagdpanzer IV tank destroyer being the exception. The MG 42 was ill-suited for enclosed secondary or coaxial mounting due to the method of barrel change. The MG 42's barrel had to be removed and replaced by sliding the barrel out at an angle such that, when mounted on a tank/armoured vehicle, armour and space would have to be compromised to fit the weapon. Although the MG 34 was older than the (arguably) improved MG 42, its barrel could be swapped in-line with the gun, meaning that the MG 34 was favoured because it was simpler to design mountings for the gun. The MG 34 was also more versatile to feed, for instance using a 75-round Patronentrommel 34 double drum magazine or being select-fire.

The main difference of the MG 34 Panzerlauf and the regular MG 34 was the heavier, almost solid Panzermantel armored barrel shroud, almost completely lacking the ventilation holes of the regular MG 34. Further the MG 34 Panzerlauf featured bipod clamps for attaching a bipod and lacked the anti-aircraft sight bracket. When mounted inside the generally limited space inside an armored vehicle, the MG 34 user detachable butt-stock was taken off. A kit for quick conversion to ground use in the light machine gun role was carried inside the tank containing a butt-stock and a combined bipod and front sight assembly. About 50,000 MG 34 Panzerlauf or MG 34 Panzermantel were produced.

=== MG 81 ===
The MG 34 was also used as the basis of a new aircraft-mounted machine gun, the MG 81 machine gun. For this role, the breech was slightly modified to allow feeds from either side, and in one version, two guns were bolted together on a single trigger to form a weapon known as the MG 81Z (for Zwilling, German for "twin" as in twin-mounted). Production of the MG 34 was never enough to satisfy any of its users, and while the MG81 was a significant improvement over the earlier MG 30-based MG 15 and MG 17 guns, these guns were used until the end of the war. As the Luftwaffe lost the battle for air superiority and declined in priority in the German war effort, MG 15s and MG 81s, which were designed as flexibly mounted aircraft machine guns, were modified and adapted for ground use by infantry, with varying degrees of success.

=== MG34F1 and MG34F2 ===
Norway used and first converted the MG 34 in the 1950s to .30-06 Springfield designated as the MG34F1 and later to 7.62×51mm NATO designated as the MG34F2. These converted MG 34's were used by the Heimevernet (Norwegian Home Guard) until the mid 1990s.

=== TNW MG34 ===
The TNW MG34 is a closed bolt, semi-automatic only version of the MG34 made by TNW firearms, marketed towards civilian collectors, and was manufactured due to the high cost and rarity of the full auto versions. Although they stopped production in 2018, they continue to make part kits for the semi automatic variant of the MG34.

== Gallery ==
US War Department instruction video on the MG 34 from 1943

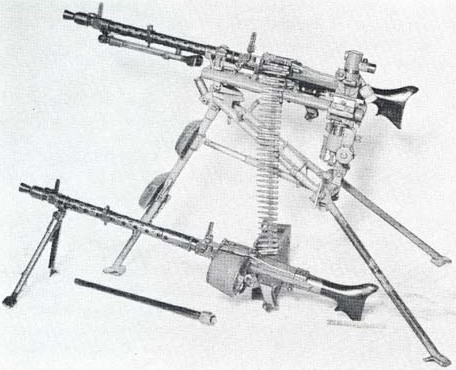
MG 34 bipod and Lafette 34 tripod mounts

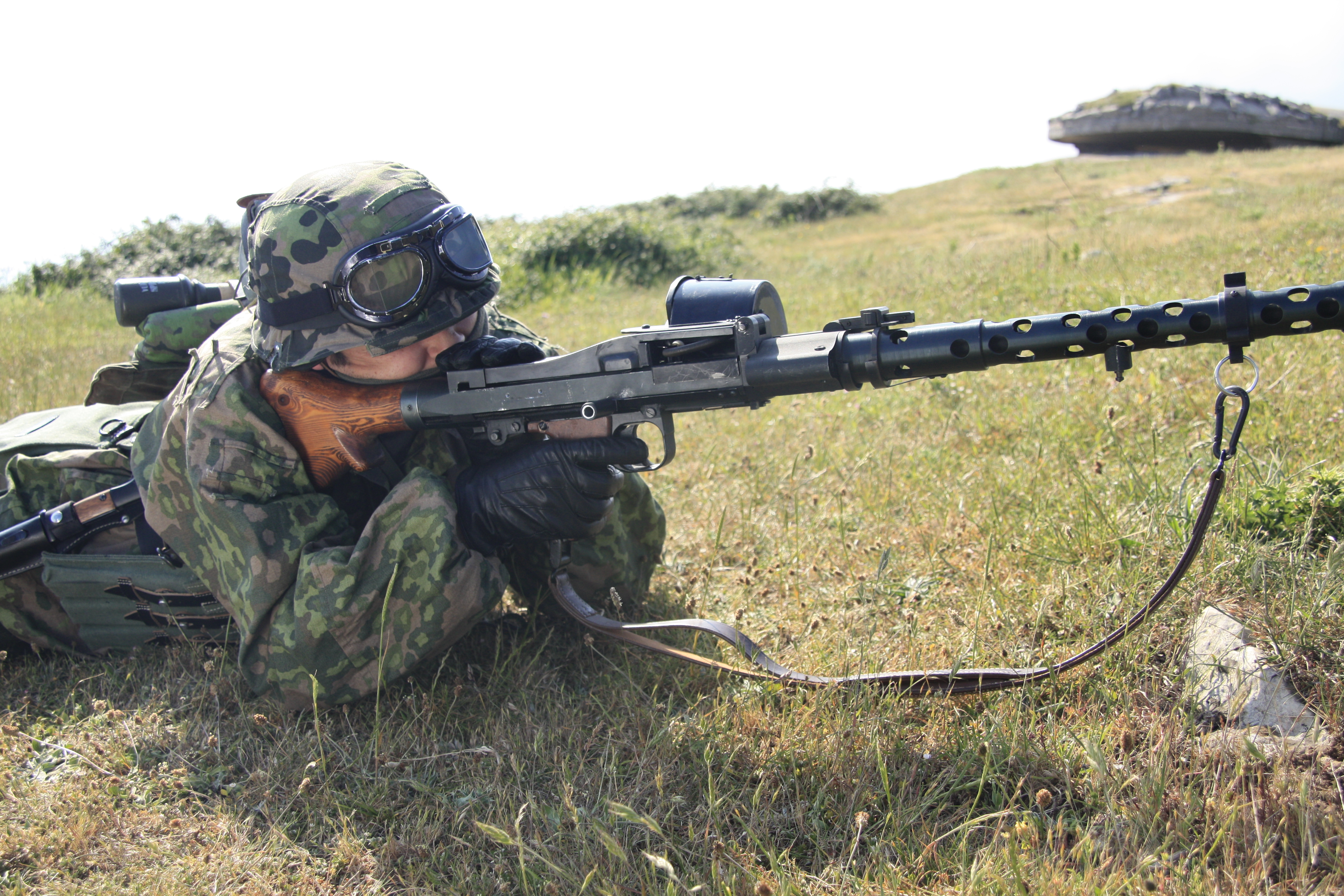
A Gurttrommel attached to the receiver of an MG 34 on its bipod during a reenactment

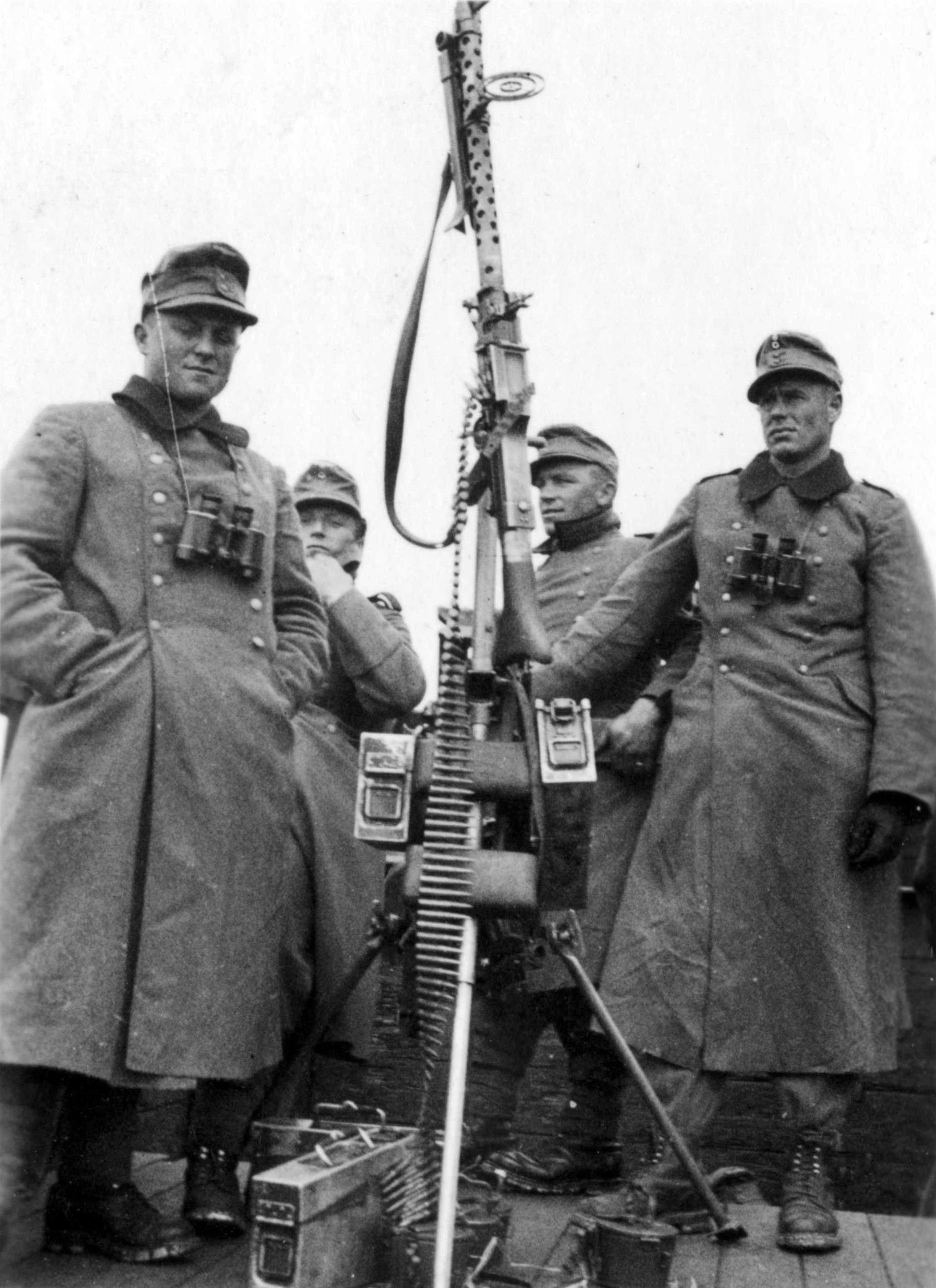
Lafette 34 tripod mounted MG 34 setup for its anti-aircraft role

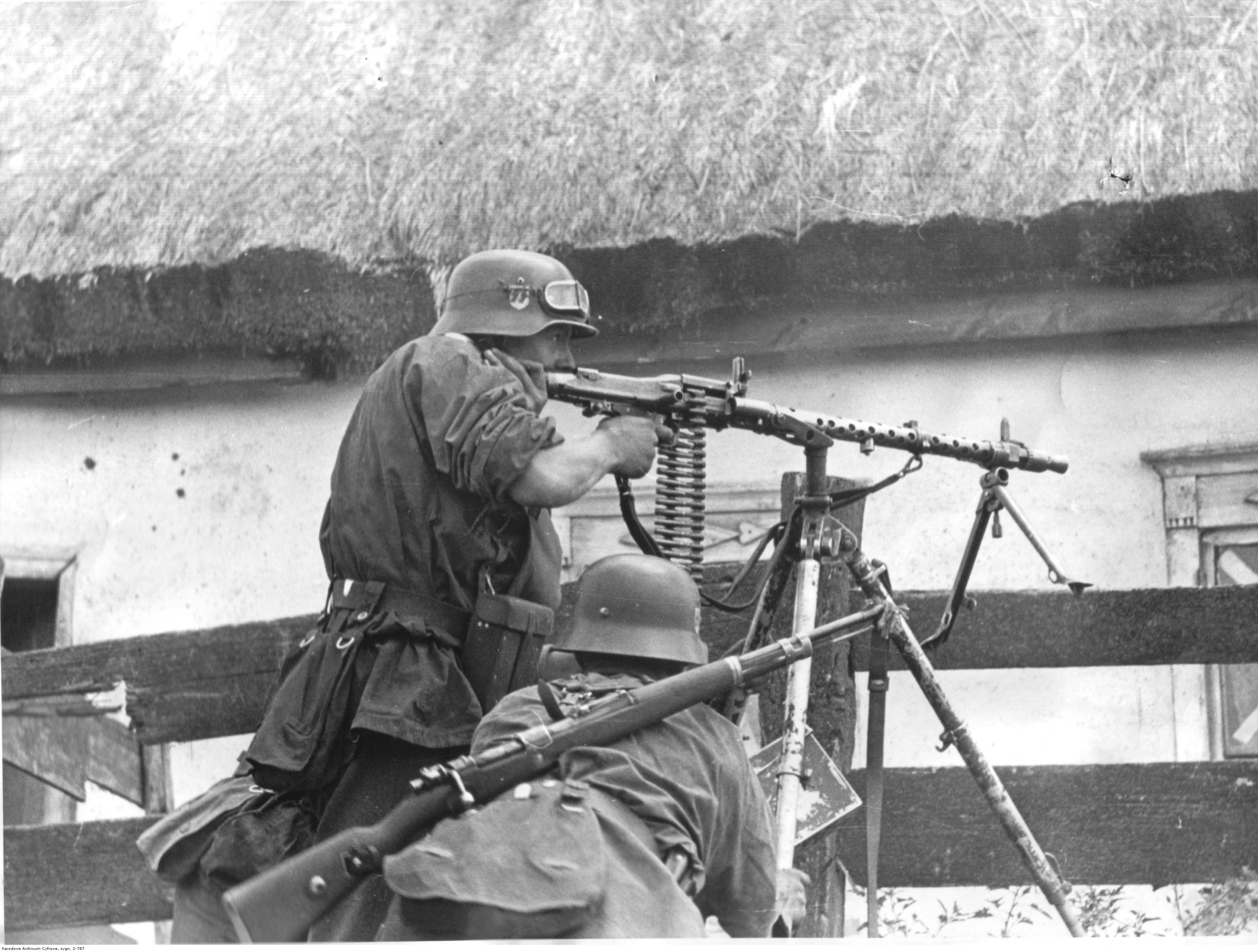
Dreibein 34 (a simple high-standing anti-aircraft tripod) mounted MG 34

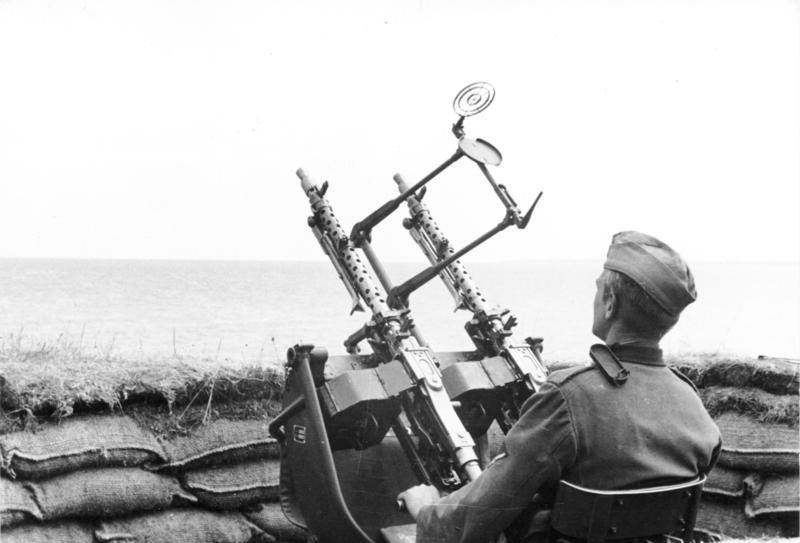
Zwillingssockel 36 mounted MG 34s

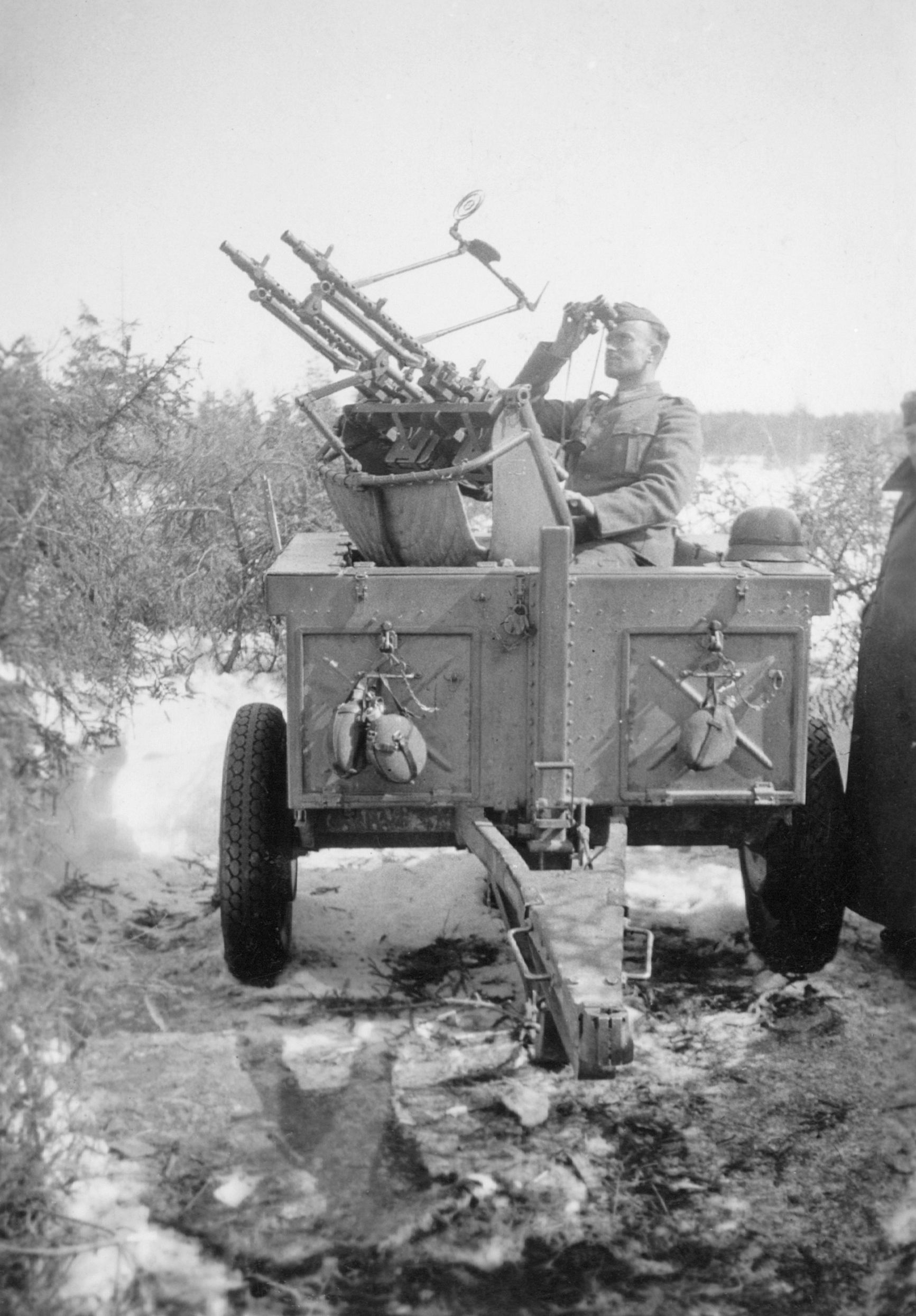
Zwillingssockel 36 mounted MG 34s on a Maschinengewehrwagen 36

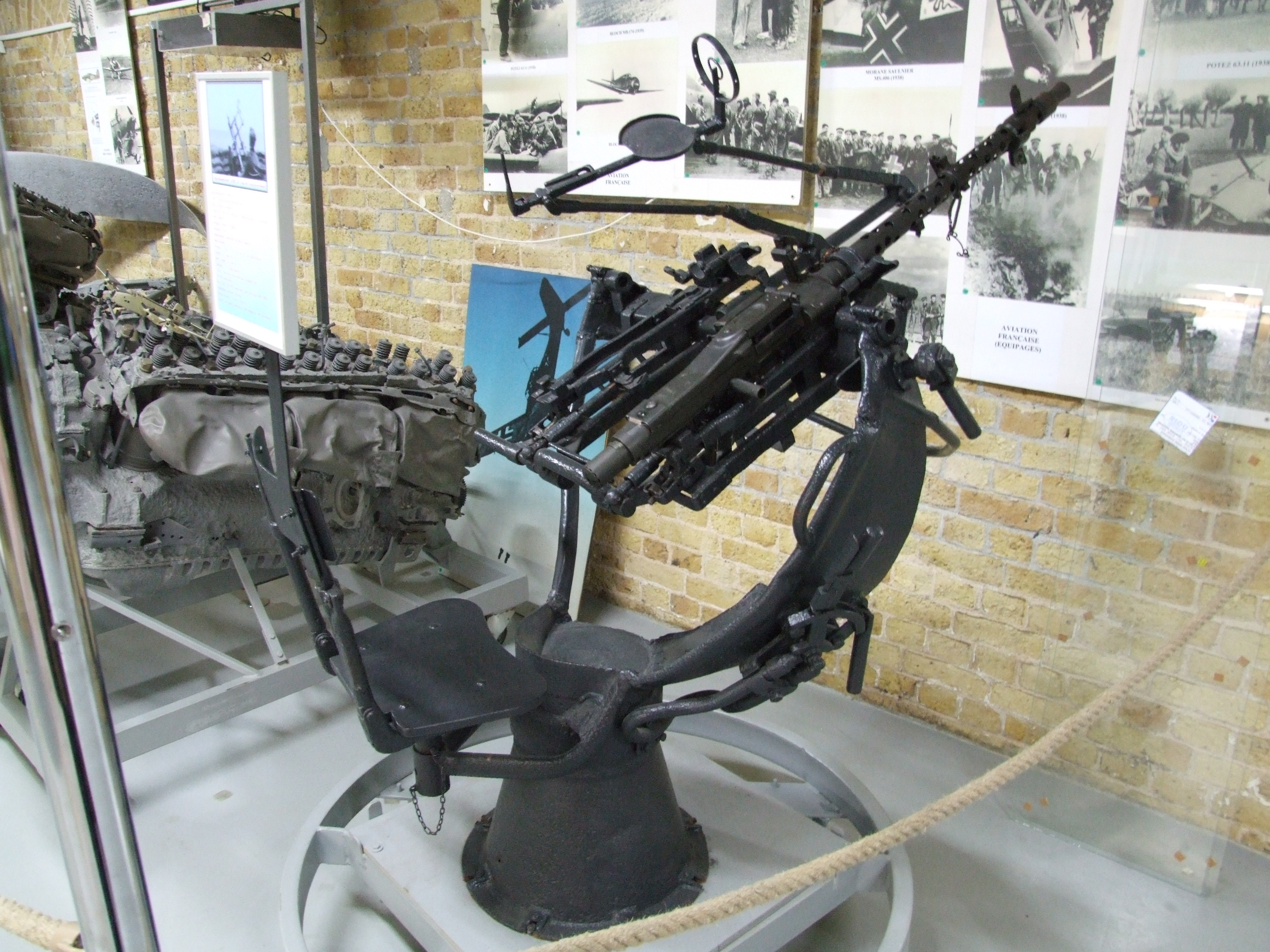
Zwillingssockel 36 with one mounted MG 34, notice the removed butt-stock

== Users ==
- Albania: Kept in reserve as late as 1988
- Algeria: supplied by Czechoslovakia
- Australia: Battlefield capture.
- Biafra: probably supplied by Czechoslovakia.
- Bulgaria: Supplied by Germany during WWII.
- Cyprus
- Cuba
- Czechoslovakia: produced at Brno during German occupation of Czechoslovakia. Production continues after the war.
- East Germany (post-war use on SK-1 armored car)
- France
- Greece: Still used in 2023.
- Guatemala: received 1,000 MG34s in 1954 from Czechoslovakia
- Independent State of Croatia
- Hungary
- Israel: supplied by Czechoslovakia.
- Libya
- Nazi Germany
- North Korea: Used in the Korean War.
- North Vietnam: Used by the NVA and Vietcong in the Vietnam War
- Norway: Used and first converted to .30-06 Springfield designated MG34F1 and later to 7.62×51mm NATO designated MG34F2 by the Heimevernet until mid 1990s
- Palestinian Fedayeen
- People's Republic of China
- Republic of China
- Romania
- Somalia
- South Africa: Captured from SWAPO forces around 1985
- Syria: supplied by Czechoslovakia
- United Kingdom: Battlefield capture.
- Yugoslav Partisans

=== Non-state users ===
- Hezbollah: Recovered by IDF.
- Syrian National Coalition

== See also ==
- List of World War II firearms of Germany
- MG 30, predecessor
- MG 42, successor
- MG 3
- MG 81 machine gun
- SIG 710-3
