= Haenel Schmeisser =

Semi-automatic pistol

The Haenel Schmeisser is a 6.35mm caliber, semi-automatic pocket pistol designed by Hugo Schmeisser, and manufactured by the gun manufacturer C. G. Haenel. Two models were produced, named the Model 1 and Model 2 respectively.
