= VMG 1927 =

VMG 1927 / MV 31
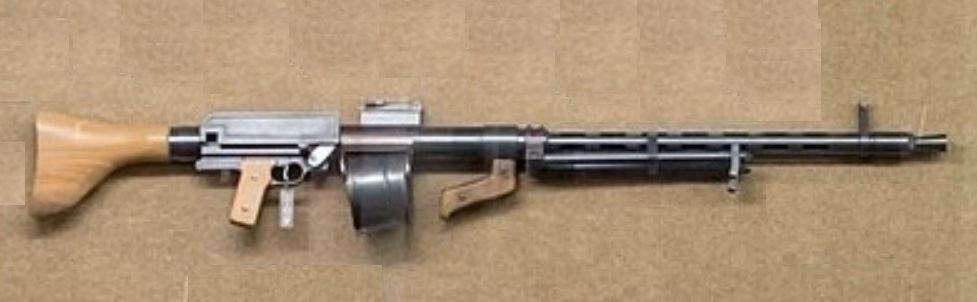
- Type: Light machine gun
- Place of origin: Germany

Production history
- Designer: Heinrich Vollmer
- Designed: 1927

Specifications
- Mass: 11.48 kg
- Length: 1550 mm
- Barrel length: 717 mm
- Cartridge: 8×57mm IS
- Caliber: 8 mm
- Action: short recoil
- Feed system: 50 Round Drum Magazine
- Sights: Iron sights

The VMG 1927 is a light machine gun designed by Heinrich Vollmer in 1927.

In 1916 Heinrich Vollmer began working on a design of a light machine gun. At the end the weapon was known as an MG Vollmer, later also as VMG 1927.

It consisted of only 78 parts while the standard MG of those days, the MG 08/15 consisted of 383 parts. It operated on the principle of short recoil with a rotary locking mechanism for the bolt, carried by helical grooves. It was fed from a small drum magazine underneath the receiver.

In 1927 Vollmer also obtained a patent covering the breech mechanism of the weapon. Later on, Vollmer co-developed the gun with Mauser Werke as the MV 31 (Mauser-Vollmer 1931). It was offered to the German ordnance board (Inspektion für Waffen und Gerät - IWG) but, after testing, it was not adopted for service. This gun had a quick-change barrel and used a drum magazine.

Two examples are known to exist, one is at the Wehrtechnische Studiensammlung Koblenz and the other at the Vojenský historický ústav Praha.
