= Hans Schmeisser =

German weapons technical designer

Hans Schmeisser was a German weapons technical designer. The son of Louis Schmeisser, who was also a famous weapons technical designer, his notable achievement was his contribution to the construction of the German "weapon city" of Suhl.

His work, along with the work of entrepreneurs and engineers like Simson, Sauer, and Haenel, helped shape Suhl for more than a century. Its name is closely connected to the Bergmann company in the development and production of machine guns up to the time of the First World War. The Bergmann company was the place where his brother, Hugo Schmeisser, received his fundamental training as a weapons designer.

In 1919, Hugo created the "Industriewerk Auhammer Koch und Co." (Industrial Auhammer Koch and Company) in Suhl. Under given conditions in Germany after the First World War, this enterprise did not run well from the outset. Into this time the first contact falls to the company Haenel in Suhl. That was the beginning of 20 years of cooperation with highs and lows. In the summer of 1922, for the security of their patents, Hugo and Hans Schmeisser created a second company under the name of "Gebrüder Schmeisser" (Brothers Schmeisser) in Suhl. Strangely, the brothers Schmeissers' attorney of the company, Haenel, remained, although they were shareholders and actually acting partners of the enterprise.
