= MP 36 =

Maschinenpistole 36
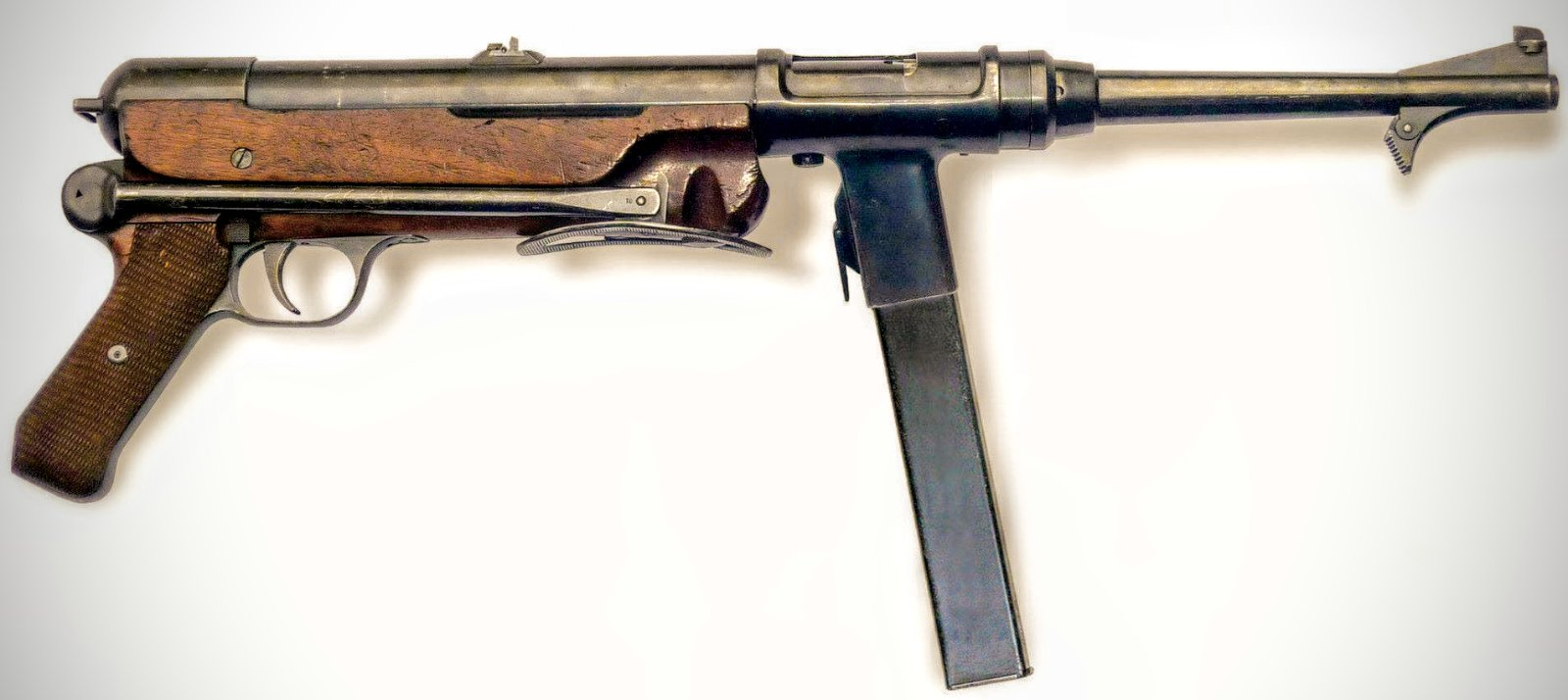
- Type: Submachine gun
- Place of origin: Germany

Service history
- In service: 1936–1945 (limited)
- Used by: See Users
- Wars: World War II

Production history
- Designer: Erma Werke
- Designed: 1936
- Manufacturer: Erma Werke

Specifications
- Mass: 3.96kg (8.73 lbs)
- Length: 831mm (32.717 in)
- Barrel length: 250mm
- Caliber: 9x19mm Parabellum

The MP 36 (Maschinenpistole 36) was a submachine gun designed in 1936 and produced by Nazi Germany during World War II. It was a select-fire 9×19mm Parabellum submachine gun with a wooden body and a steel folding stock.

== History ==
In January 1938, the German Heereswaffenamt requested a lightweight, compact, rapid firing 9mm weapon for paratroopers and armored crews. The result was the MP 38, a revolutionary submachine gun design which later became the MP 40. However, the MP 38 was produced extraordinarily quickly because Erma-Werke had already produced a prototype submachine gun, the MP 36, before they were even approached to produce one. The MP 36 was virtually unheard-of even at the time and very few are known to exist. Few were captured by the Allies. The models that were captured mysteriously did not use their own magazines, instead using MP 40 magazines. Also, the weapons only had one set of markings; they simply read "ERMA ERFURT EMP-36 (Erma Maschinenpistole 1936)". It's likely that the MP 36 has never been mass-produced.

== Design ==
This submachine gun was a selective-fire, 9×19mm Parabellum submachine gun, which had a wooden body and a steel folding stock. The weapon had only one set of markings, which read "ERMA ERFURT EMP-36 (Erma Maschinenpistole 1936)". Nothing else is known afterwards about the design.

== Users ==
- Nazi Germany: Limited

== See also ==
- MP 40
- 9×19mm Parabellum
