= Bergmann MG 15nA machine gun =

German light machine gun

Bergmann MG 15nA
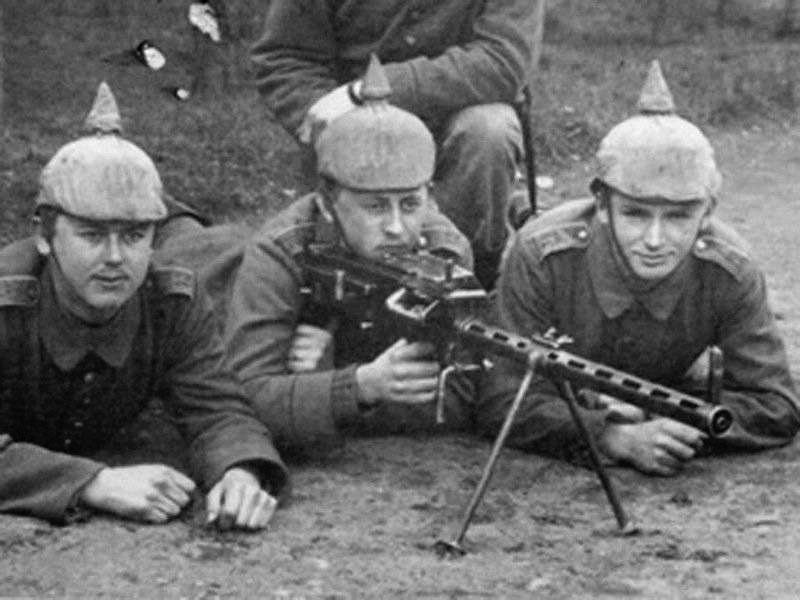
- German soldiers with a Bergmann MG 15nA
- Type: Light machine gun
- Place of origin: German Empire

Service history
- In service: 1916–1920s
- Used by: See Users
- Wars: World War I German Revolution; Turkish War of Independence; Warlord era Spanish Civil War; World War II (Limited)

Production history
- Designer: Theodor Bergmann and Louis Schmeisser
- Designed: 1910
- Manufacturer: Bergmann Waffenfabrik
- Produced: 1916–1919
- No. built: Approx. 1500 LMG15a/A Approx. 6000 LMG15n/A

Specifications
- Mass: 12.9 kg (28 lb)
- Length: 1,120 mm (44 in)
- Barrel length: 726 mm (28.6 in)
- Cartridge: 7.92×57mm Mauser
- Action: Short recoil
- Rate of fire: 500–600 rounds/min
- Muzzle velocity: 883 m/s (2,900 ft/s)
- Effective firing range: >2,000 m (2,200 yd)
- Feed system: 250-, 200-, or 100-round metal-link belt
- Sights: Iron sights

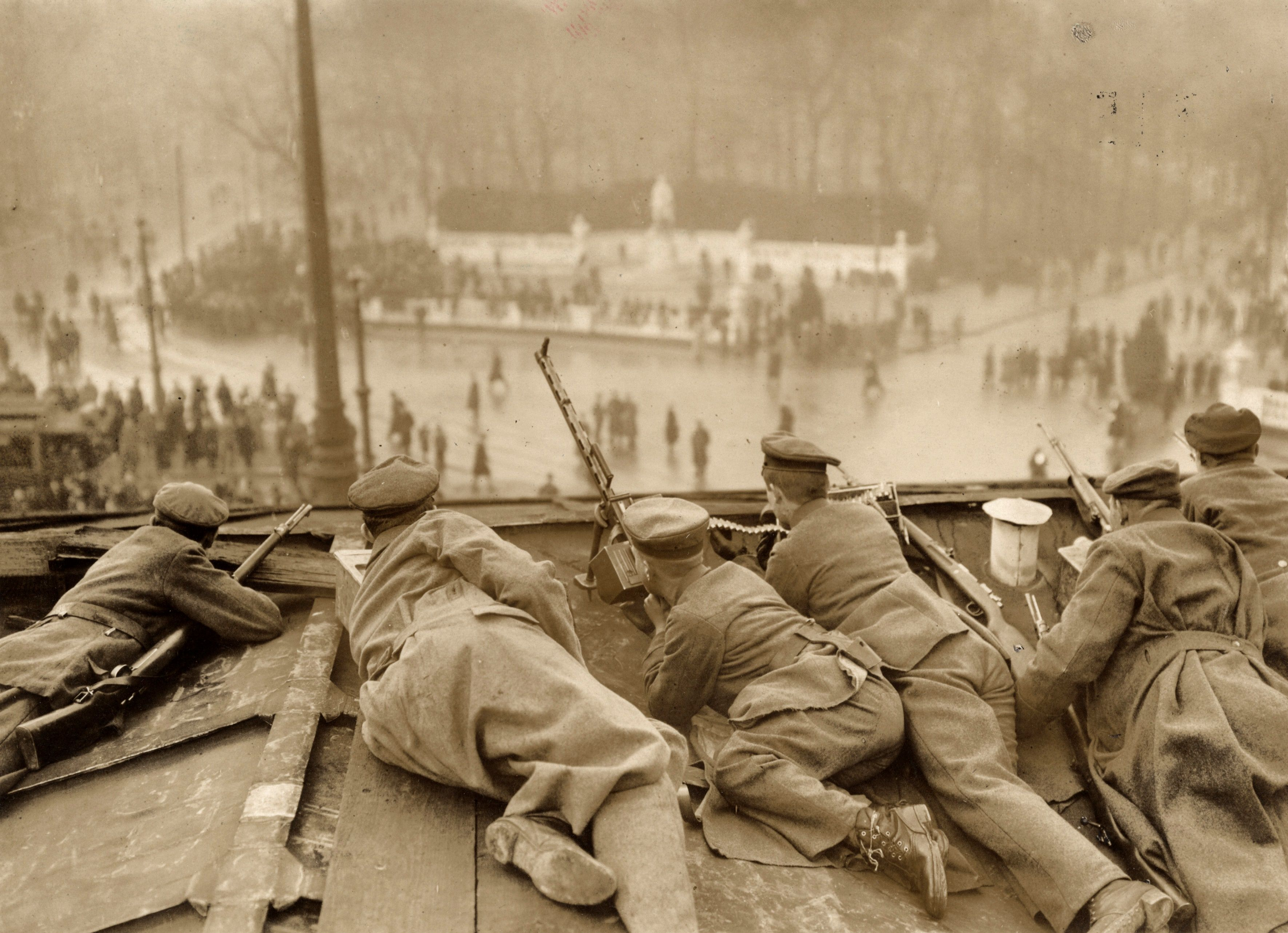
German soldiers on a rooftop during the Spartacist uprising. The soldier in the center is holding a Bergmann MG 15nA (1919).

The Bergmann MG 15nA was a World War I light machine gun produced by Germany starting in 1915. It used 100- and 200-round belts and utilized a bipod, which allowed the weapon to be mounted on a flat surface for more accurate firing.

== Design and development ==
The Bergmann gun used a lock system patented by Theodor Bergmann in 1901 along with the short recoil principle of operation. The locking system, in which a cam moves a lock vertically in the weapon, was not dissimilar to the Browning machine gun designs. Bergmann started developing machine guns in 1901. These evolved through a number of models as water cooled medium machine guns. This early design work was in part performed by Louis Schmeisser. By 1910 the then-current model used cloth belts, fired from a closed bolt and could fire at around 600rpm. A 1915 model was produced which had been slightly modified so it could share a mount with the MG 08.

The weapon was then lightened for both infantry and aircraft use. For aircraft usage, the bolt was lightened and the mechanism sped up from 500 rounds per minute to 800. For ground use, this weapon was adopted as the Bergmann MG 15. For aircraft us, the receiver was machined down and lightened, featured a butt stock fitted to the rear end of the weapon. It was given a pistol grip and trigger group instead of spade grips, the heavy cooling jacket was replaced with a thin perforated barrel shroud. To assist cooling, the aircraft gun fired from an open bolt and was designated as the LMG15. The LMG15 was soon utilized for ground use by fitting an improvised bipod halfway along the barrel. Overall, 1500 LMG15s were produced.

The major development of the weapon came early in 1916 when the Bergmann LMG 15 was converted into a second variation to mirror the development of the Maxim MG 08/15. This dedicated infantry version was designated as the LMG15n/A (n/A standing for neuer Art or new model) and reverted to firing from a closed bolt. The rate of fire was slowed back down to reduce overheating in the ground role. The flimsy bipod was removed from the barrel shroud and replaced with the standard MG08/15 bipod relocated to just forward of the pistol grip. Sling mounting swivels were added allowing the LMG15n/A to be fired from the waist. A handle added to the top of the barrel jacket well forward of the gun's center of gravity to allowed the gun to be stabilized and pointed in this mode. Most LMG15n/A production of approximately 6000 units used the 400m flip up rear sight of the original LMG15, with some being fitted with the 2000m 'lange' rear sight of the standard infantry rifle. The old pattern was then renamed the Bergmann MG 15aA for alter Art ('old model'). The MG 15nA saw much more frequent use amongst Imperial German forces than the MG 15aA.

== Service use ==
Battlefield usage of the weapon was significant, but not to the extent of the Maxim weapons. The Bergmann MG 15nA was an important weapon in that it filled a gap in the German armory between the rifle and the heavy machine gun. The only other light machine guns the Imperial German Army fielded before the Bergmann was adopted was the Madsen machine gun used by the Musketen battalions.

In the 1916 Battle of the Somme, the German Army found that they desperately needed a weapon to counter the British Army's Lewis light machine gun, and the limited quantities of Madsen guns only added to the need for a light machine gun. Germany did not produce any Madsens in the First World War and relied almost entirely on captured weaponry; Madsen machine guns were gathered from a variety of sources—including a captured shipment heading to Bulgaria of 660 guns, around 300 smuggled directly from Denmark and others a few captured from Belgium. The German Army, reeling from the Battle of the Somme, ordered some 6,000 MG 15nA examples in November 1916. These weapons were distributed to the Musketen and other infantry battalions before enough troops could be trained upon the new MG 08/15 in the winter and spring of 1917.

The majority of MG 15nA weapons were actually delivered to the Eastern and Palestine fronts where the German Asia Corps made the most significant use of the gun. A major limitation of the weapon was that its air-cooled barrel would overheat after 250 rounds of sustained fire; they were therefore grouped into sections in which the tactical positioning allowed the gunners to open fire alternately, or were attributed to mobile detachments which did not require long periods of sustained fire. The German Leichtmaschinengewehr Truppen ("Light Machine Gun Units") were formed specifically for the weapon.

The LMG 15nA was a generally reliable gun that served until the manufacture of automatic weaponry was ceased in 1919 under the Treaty of Versailles, but the dominance of the Maxim 08 during the war meant it never acquired much enthusiasm from military officials. The weapon had faded into obscurity by the time of the Second World War, though some were used by the Republicans during the Spanish Civil War. During the closing months of World War II, it was briefly put back into service by German Volkssturm units who lacked modern equipment and were oriented towards "last-ditch" defensive roles—due to failing production and logistics during the last phase of the war, Nazi Germany was pressing into service any weapons they had available.

== Users ==
- China: M1910 purchased during the Warlord Era
- German Empire: Designated the LMG 15.
- Ottoman Empire: Received from Germany in 1917.
  - (Ottoman Empire) Ankara Government
- Latvia: 52 in stock of the Latvian Army by April 1936
- Nazi Germany: Used by Volkssturm
- Spanish Republic: Stocks of WW1-surplus Bergmanns received via way of Poland.
