= Louis Schmeisser =

Weapons designer in Europe

- Born: Louis Schmeisser; 5 February 1848; Zöllnitz, Saxe-Altenburg
- Died: 23 March 1917 (aged 69); Suhl, German Empire
- Occupation: Inventor
- Children: Hans Schmeisser, Hugo Schmeisser

Louis Schmeisser (5 February 1848, Zöllnitz – 23 March 1917) was one of the best-known weapon technical designers of Europe. He is associated with the early development and production of the series of guns that would become the Bergmann machine guns used during the First World War. He designed the Dreyse 1907 Pistol which was used in both World Wars.

Schmeisser was born in Zöllnitz, Saxe-Altenburg. He was the father of Hugo Schmeisser (1884–1953), who was also a famous designer of infantry weapons, including the StG 44. His other son, Hans Schmeisser, was also a well-known weaponry designer.
