= Gustloff =

Gustloff is a German surname. Notable people with the surname include:

- Wilhelm Gustloff, the German leader of the Swiss Nazi party

== See also ==
- MV Wilhelm Gustloff, a German military transport ship which was sunk on 30 January 1945.
- Gustloff Werke, manufacturing facilities such as the subsidiary Otto Eberhardt Patronenfabrik
