= MP 40 =

WWII German submachine gun

Maschinenpistole 40
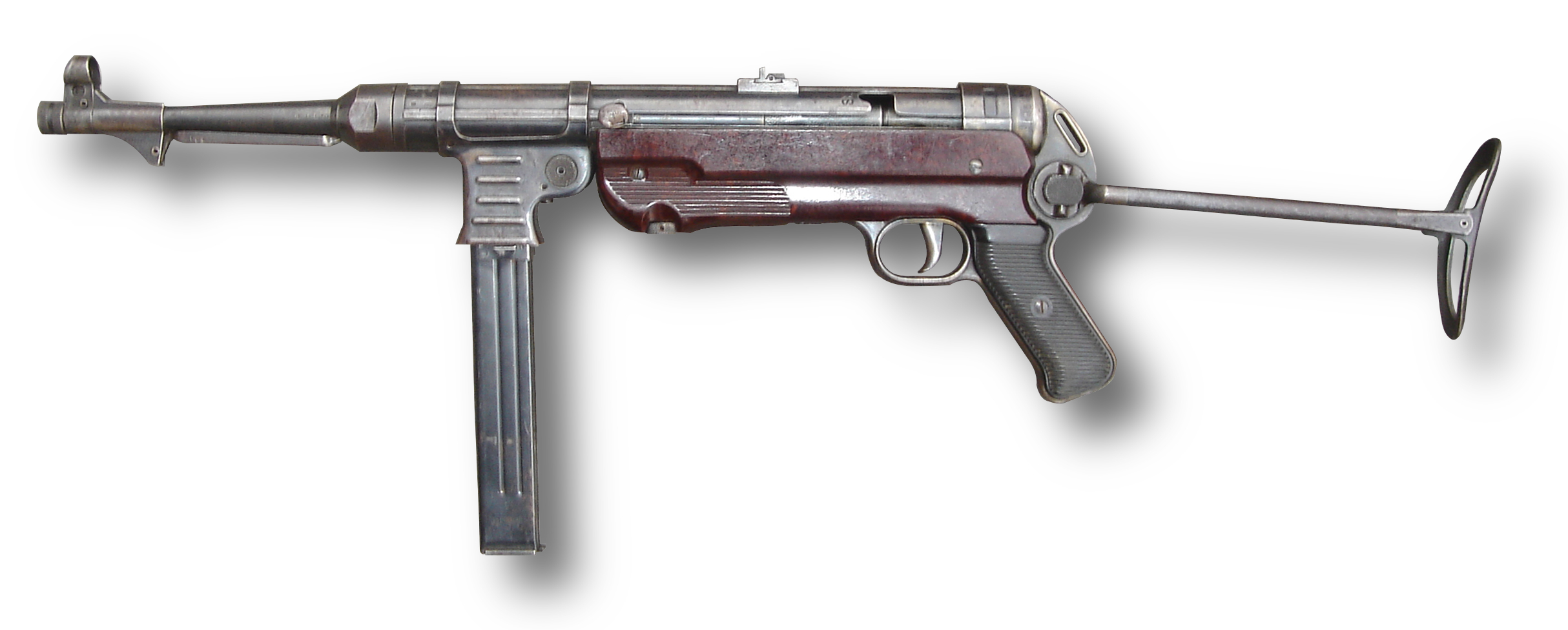
- A Maschinenpistole 40 made by Erma Werke in 1943 with the stock unfolded.
- Type: Submachine gun
- Place of origin: Nazi Germany

Service history
- In service: 1939–1945 (Nazi Germany); 1940–present (other countries)
- Used by: See Users
- Wars: World War II; Continuation War; Guerrilla war in the Baltic states; Greek Civil War; Indonesian National Revolution; First Indochina War; 1948 Arab–Israeli War; Palestinian Fedayeen insurgency (1949-1954); Algerian War; Malayan emergency; Vietnam War; West New Guinea dispute; Rhodesian Bush War; Lebanese Civil War; Guatemalan Civil War; Yugoslav Wars; Iraq War (limited); Syrian Civil War (limited); Russo-Ukrainian War (limited)

Production history
- Designer: Heinrich Vollmer; Berthold Geipel
- Designed: 1938
- Manufacturer: Steyr-Mannlicher; Erma Werke; Haenel
- Unit cost: 57 ℛ︁ℳ︁ (1940); €130 current equivalent
- Produced: 1940–1945 (MP 40)
- No. built: 1,100,000 (estimated)
- Variants: MP 36; MP 38; MP 40; MP 40/1; MP 41

Specifications
- Mass: 3.97 kg (8.75 lb)
- Length: 833 mm (32.8 in) stock extended/630 mm (24.8 in) stock folded
- Barrel length: 251 mm (9.9 in)
- Cartridge: 9×19mm Parabellum
- Action: Straight blowback, open bolt
- Rate of fire: 500–550 rounds/min
- Muzzle velocity: 400 m/s (1,312 ft/s)
- Effective firing range: 100–200 m (330–660 ft)
- Maximum firing range: 250 m (820 ft)
- Feed system: 32-round detachable box magazine, 64-round with dual magazines
- Sights: Hooded front blade

The MP 40 (Maschinenpistole 40) is a submachine gun chambered for the 9×19mm Parabellum cartridge. Developed in Nazi Germany, it saw service with the Axis forces during World War II and extensive use post-war globally with various fighting forces.

Designed in 1938 by Heinrich Vollmer (with inspiration from its predecessor, the MP 38), it was heavily used by infantrymen (particularly by platoon- and squad-leaders), and by paratroopers, both on the Eastern and Western Fronts as well as by the crews of armoured fighting vehicles. Its advanced and modern features made it a favorite among soldiers and popular in countries from various parts of the world after the war.

The Allies often referred to the MP 40 as the "Schmeisser", after the firearms-designer Hugo Schmeisser (1884-1953). In 1917, Schmeisser had designed the MP 18, which was the first mass-produced submachine gun. He did not, however, have anything to do with the design or development of the MP 40, although he held a patent on the magazine.

The MP 40's variants included the MP 40/I and the MP 41. Erma Werke produced an estimated 1.1 million MP 40s between 1940 and 1945.

== Development ==
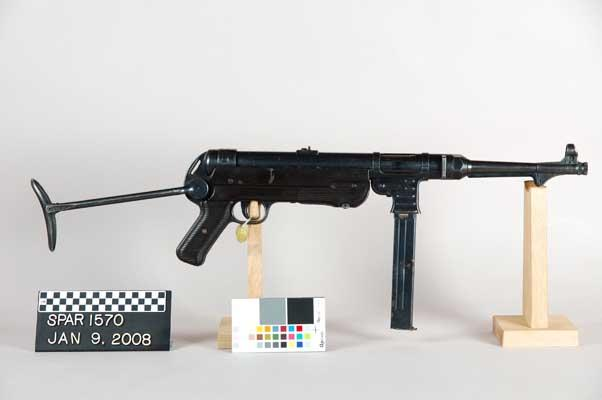
MP-40 on display for the Springfield Armory National Historic Site Archives

The Maschinenpistole 40 ("Machine pistol 40") descended from its predecessor, the MP 38, which was in turn based on the MP 36, a prototype made of machined steel. The MP 36 was developed independently by Erma Werke's Berthold Geipel with funding from the German Army. It took design elements from Heinrich Vollmer's VPM 1930 and EMP. Vollmer then worked on Berthold Geipel's MP 36 and in 1938 submitted a prototype to answer a request from the Heereswaffenamt (Army Weapons Office) for a new submachine gun, which was adopted as MP 38. The MP 38 incorporated the simpler bolt design of Hugo Schmeisser's M.K.36,III as well as Schmeisser's magazine, but otherwise more closely followed Geipel's MP 36 design. The MP 38 was a simplification of the MP 36, and the MP 40 was a further simplification of the MP 38, with certain cost-saving alterations, most notably in the more extensive use of stamped steel rather than machined parts.

== Design ==
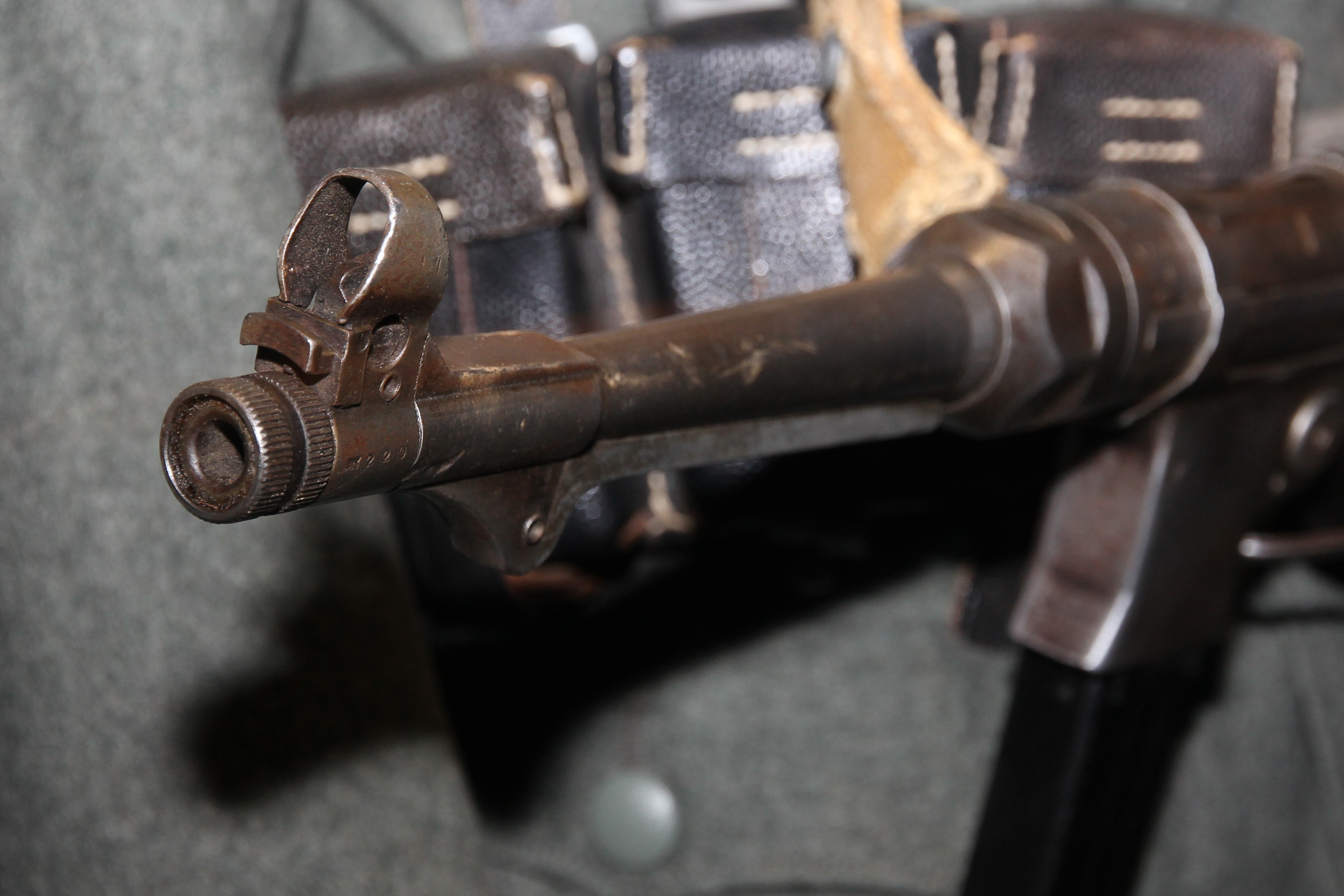
MP-40 front sight and muzzle

The MP 40 submachine guns are open-bolt, blowback-operated automatic arms. The only mode of fire is automatic, but the relatively low rate of fire permits single shots with controlled trigger pulls. The bolt features a telescoping return spring guide which serves as a pneumatic recoil buffer. The cocking handle was permanently attached to the bolt on early MP 38s, but on late-production MP 38s and MP 40s, the bolt handle was made as a separate part. It also serves as a safety by pushing the head of the handle into one of two separate notches above the main opening; this action locks the bolt in either the cocked (rear) or uncocked (forward) position. The absence of this feature on early MP 38s resulted in field expedients such as leather harnesses with a small loop that were used to hold the bolt in the forward position.

The MP 38 receiver was made of machined steel, but this was a time-consuming and expensive process. To save time and materials, and thus increase production, construction of the MP 40 receiver was simplified by using stamped steel and electro-spot welding as much as possible. The MP 38 also features longitudinal grooving on the receiver and bolt, as well as a circular opening on the magazine housing. These features were eliminated on the MP 40.

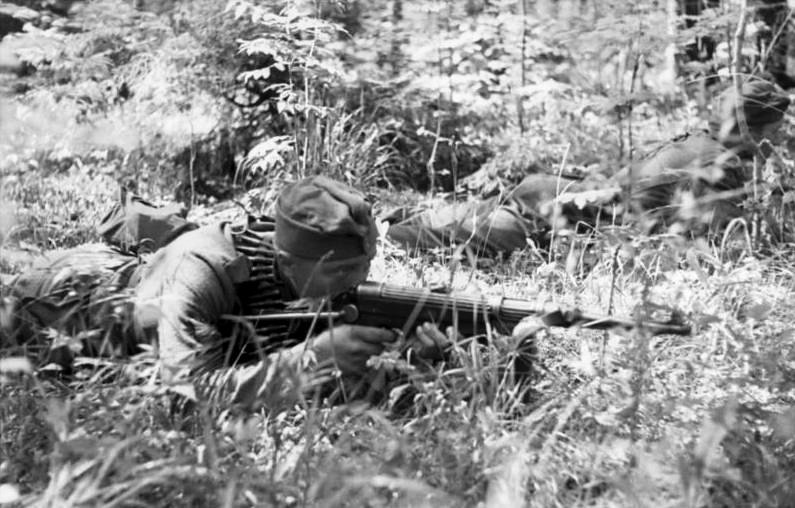
A soldier of the 1st SS Cossack Cavalry Division of the German Army with an MP 38 in 1943

One feature found on most MP 38 and MP 40 submachine guns is an aluminum, steel, or Margolit (a variation of Bakelite) resting bar under the barrel. This was used to steady the weapon when firing over the side of open-top armored personnel carriers such as the Sd.Kfz. 251 half-track. A handguard, also made of Margolit, is located between the magazine housing and the Margolit pistol grip. The barrel lacked any form of insulation, which often resulted in burns on the supporting hand if it was incorrectly positioned. The MP 40 also has a forward-folding metal stock, the first for a submachine gun, resulting in a shorter overall weapon when folded. However, this stock design was at times insufficiently durable for hard combat use.

Although the MP 40 was generally reliable, a major weakness was its 32-round magazine. Unlike the double-column, staggered-feed magazine found on the Thompson M1921/1928 variants, the MP 40 uses a double-column, single-feed version. The single-feed insert resulted in increased friction against the remaining cartridges moving upwards towards the feed lips, occasionally resulting in feed failures; this problem was exacerbated by the presence of dirt or other debris. Another problem was that the magazine was also sometimes misused as a handhold. This could cause the weapon to malfunction when hand pressure on the magazine body caused the magazine lips to move out of the line of feed, since the magazine well did not keep the magazine firmly locked. German soldiers were trained to grasp either the handguard on the underside of the weapon or the magazine housing with the supporting hand to avoid feed malfunctions.

== Usage ==
US Army Signal Corps instructional film from 1943

At the outbreak of World War II, the majority of German soldiers carried either Karabiner 98k rifles or MP 40s, both of which were regarded as the standard weapons of choice for an infantryman.

However, later confrontations with Soviet troops such as the Battle of Stalingrad, where entire enemy units were armed with PPSh-41 submachine guns, the Germans found themselves out-gunned in short range urban combat, which caused a shift in their tactics, and by the end of the war the MP 40 and its derivatives were sometimes issued to entire assault platoons. The soldiers of US Army were impressed with the MP 40's 9mm caliber. The 9mm didn't have as powerful recoil as the .45 ACP did. As the war progressed, Many American soldiers who were equipped with the .45 ACP Thompson submachine gun or the M3 'Grease Gun' would swap for a captured MP 38, MP 40 or MP 41 whenever their submachine gun was in need of repair. Supplies of .45 ACP became difficult in long haul transportation from port cities to the front. Starting in 1943, the German military moved to replace both the Karabiner 98k rifle and MP 40 with the new, revolutionary StG 44. By the end of World War II in 1945, an estimated 1.1 million MP 40s had been produced of all variants.

=== Post-war use ===
During and after the end of World War II, many MP 40s were captured or surrendered (upwards of 200,000) to the Allies and were then redistributed to the paramilitary and irregular forces of some developing countries. Many were also sold in the black market as well and used in criminal gangs. The Norwegian army withdrew the MP 38 from use in 1975 but used the MP 40 for some years more. In particular, the Territorial (Heimevernet) used it until about 1990, when it was replaced by the Heckler & Koch MP5.

During the Russian invasion of Ukraine, some surviving guns saw use by both Russian and Ukrainian forces.

== Variants ==
=== MP 40/I ===
The MP 40/I (sometimes erroneously called MP 40/II) was a modified version of the standard MP 40 with a dual side-by-side magazine holder (for an ammunition total of 64 rounds on hand), designed for troops on the Eastern Front to counter the Soviet PPSh-41's larger 71-round drum magazine capacity. However, the design proved unsuccessful due to weight and reliability issues. In addition to the dual mag magazine well, the MP 40/I’s had a smaller buttpad, increased cutout of the receiver tubing for the larger magwell and a shortened ejector.

=== MP 41 ===
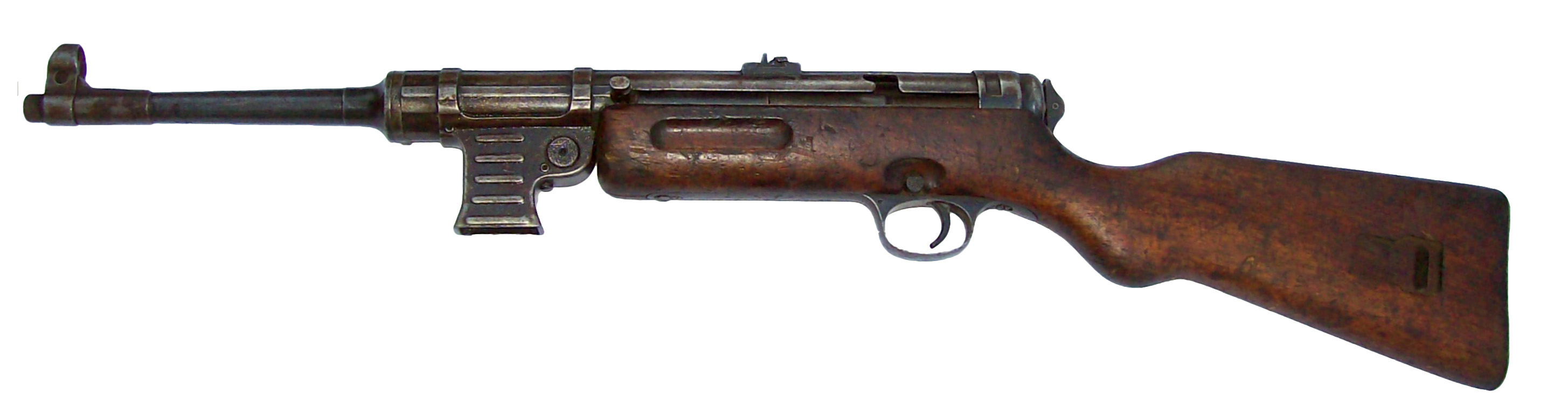
An MP 41 with wooden stock

In 1941, Hugo Schmeisser designed the MP 41, which was an MP 40 upper receiver with a lower receiver and stock assembly of an MP 28/II submachine gun. It saw limited service, being issued primarily only to SS and police units. The MP 41 was also supplied to Germany's Axis ally Romania.

Later in 1941, rival company Erma Werke sued Haenel, at which Schmeisser was Chief Designer, for patent infringement. Production subsequently ceased on the MP 41.

== Influence on later weapons ==
The MP 38 and MP 40 also directly influenced the design of later weapons, including the Spanish Star Z45, the Yugoslavian Zastava M56, and the semi-automatic German Selbstladebüchse BD 38 replica.

Details of the MP 40 have also been adopted in other submachine guns, which otherwise differ significantly from a technical point of view:

- The designers of the American M3 "Grease Gun" examined British Sten guns and captured MP 40s for usable construction details.
- The folding stock became the model for those on later weapons, such as the Soviet PPS-43 and the AKS version of the AK-47.
- The MP 40 magazine can also be used in the Belgian Vigneron submachine gun.

== Users ==
Simone Segouin, a French partisan, posing with an MP 40 in 1944

During World War II, the resistance and the Allies sometimes captured MP 40s to replace or supplement their own weapons. The MP 40 was used for several decades following World War II by many countries around the world in armed conflicts. Some found their way into guerrilla groups such as the Viet Cong or African guerrillas.

Its operators have included:

=== Current ===
- Syria: Used against Israel and used during Syrian Civil War.
- Russia: Limited use during the Russian invasion of Ukraine
- Ukraine: Limited use during the Russian invasion of Ukraine

=== Former ===
- Albania: Kept in reserve as late as 1988
- Algeria: The National Liberation Army used MP 40s supplied by Czechoslovakia and Yugoslavia.
- Austria
- Bosnia and Herzegovina
- Bulgaria
- Chad
- Chile: Cuba supplied some to the Salvador Allende Government
- Croatia
- Czechoslovakia
- Finland: Around 160 were delivered together with German vehicles during the Continuation War; after the war they were used by prison administration before being retired in the 1970s.
- France: French rebels used captured guns during World War II. MP 40s were also carried by the Free French Army in World War II and the Post War French Army in French Indochina and French Algeria especially by paratroopers.
- Greece
- Guatemala: MP 38/40 supplied in 1954 from Czechoslovakia, still in service with the police at the end of the Guatemalan Civil War.
- Hungary
- Indonesia
- Israel: Used during the 1948 Arab-Israeli War and by Unit 101 before replaced by the Uzi in 1954.
- Iran: Used in small numbers by the 55th Airborne Brigade and Iranian Imperial Guards.
- Italian Partisans: Used examples captured from German soldiers.
- Jordan
- Kosovo Liberation Army
- Nazi Germany: Used by the Wehrmacht, Feldgendarmerie, Gestapo, Waffen-SS, Volkssturm, and Hitler Youth at the end of war.
- Netherlands: Post war, used by KNIL during the Indonesian National Revolution and the Papuan Volunteer Corps during West New Guinea dispute.
- Norway
- Poland: Captured MP 40s were used by Polish rebels during World War II.
- Romania
- Soviet Union: Captured MP 40s were used by Soviet partisans and Worker-Peasant Red Army. After the war the MP 40 along with other weapons were sold to other countries in the Eastern Bloc.
- South Vietnam: Used by the South Vietnamese Popular Force.
- Spain: Copied as the Star Model Z-45.
- United States: Captured MP 40s used by United States during World War II and by Special Forces and their Civilian Irregular Defense Group program at the beginning of the Vietnam War.
- United Kingdom: Captured MP 40s used by the British during World War II. Used by British Commandos and other British clandestine units in specialist operations.
- Vietnam: Captured from the French Far East Expeditionary Corps and used by the Viet Minh, the Viet Cong and the People's Army of Vietnam.
- Yugoslavia
- Zaire
- Zimbabwe: Used by ZIPRA and ZANLA.

== Civilian ownership in the United States ==
During the Allied occupation of Germany starting in 1945, US servicemen shipped home thousands of captured firearms as war trophies, including MP 40s. This practice required proper registration of automatic weapons in accordance with the National Firearms Act before they could be imported, but this was curtailed later in the occupation, meaning a relatively small number of civilian-transferable original German MP 40s remain in circulation and are valued at around $20,000-37,500 as of 2021, with some selling for almost $50,000.

After the commercial importation of complete machine guns was banned by the Gun Control Act of 1968, MP 40 parts kits (the disassembled parts of the gun excluding the receiver tube) were imported and reassembled onto receivers manufactured in the United States by Charles Erb, Wilson Arms, and others. These remanufactured legally transferable machine guns, colloquially called "tube guns", are (depending on quality of construction and condition) generally valued at 50-75% of the price of original German MP 40s, as they do not have their historical background. As such, they are commonly used for recreational range shooting and WW2 historical reenactments, because the associated wear and tear (within reasonable limits) will not significantly diminish their value, as it would on original collectible examples. Manufacture of new tube guns ceased following the passage of the Firearm Owners Protection Act in 1986.

There are several semi-automatic variants and cosmetic replicas of the MP 40 available for civilian ownership in the US. Beginning in 2014, American Tactical Imports began importing an MP 40 replica manufactured by German Sporting Guns GmbH chambered in .22LR, and since 2016 has also imported a pistol variant chambered in 9mm.

== See also ==
- List of World War II infantry weapons
- List of submachine guns
- List of World War II firearms of Germany

== Sources ==
- Axworthy, Mark (1991). The Romanian Army of World War II. Osprey Publishing. ISBN 978-1855321694.
- Bishop, Chris (2002). The Encyclopedia of Weapons of World War II. Sterling Publishing Company, Inc. ISBN 978-1586637620.
- Dunlap, Roy (1966). Ordnance Went Up Front. R & R Books. ISBN 978-1884849091.
- Ezell, Edward Clinton (1988a). Small arms today: latest reports on the world's weapons and ammunition (2nd ed.). Harrisburg, PA: Stackpole Books. ISBN 978-0-8117-2280-3.
- Fowler, William (2005). Stalingrad, the Vital Seven Days. Spellmount. ISBN 978-1862272781.
- Hobart, Frank (1975). Pictorial History of the Sub-machine Gun. Scribner Publishing. ISBN 978-0684141862.
- Hogg, Ian; Weeks, John, eds. (1977). Military Small Arms of the 20th Century. Arms & Armour Press. ISBN 0-85368-301-8.
- Hogg, Ian (2001). Submachine Guns. Greenhill Books. ISBN 978-1853674488.
- Ingram, Mike (2001). The MP40 Submachine Gun. Zenith Imprint. ISBN 0-7603-1014-9.
- Katz, Samuel (1988). Israeli Elite Units Since 1948. Osprey Publishing. ISBN 0-85045-8374.
- Myatt, Frederick; Ridefort, Gerard, eds. (1992). New Illustrated Guide to Modern Rifles & Sub-Machine Guns. Smithmark Publishing. ISBN 978-0831750558.
- Neil, Grant (2015). Mauser Military Rifles. Osprey Publishing. ISBN 978-1472805942.
- Peterson, Philip (2011). Standard Catalog of Military Firearms: The Collector's Price and Reference Guide. F+W Media, Inc. ISBN 978-1440228810.
- Priestley, Rick; Cavatore, Alessio, eds. (2014). Bolt Action: World War II Wargames Rules. Osprey Publishing. ISBN 978-1782009702.
- de Quesada, Alejandro (2014). MP 38 and MP 40 Submachine Guns. Osprey Publishing. ISBN 978-1780963884.
- Rottman, Gordon L (2012). The AK-47: Kalashnikov-series Assault Rifles. Osprey Publishing. ISBN 978-1-84908-835-0.
- Willbanks, James (2004). Machine Guns: An Illustrated History of Their Impact. ABC-CLIO. ISBN 978-1851094806.
- "Erma MP-38 and MP-40 submachine gun (Germany)". World Guns. Archived from the original on 4 June 2012.
- "MP40 Manufacturers and Markings". Medal Net.
