= Heinrich Vollmer =

German small-arms designer

- Heinrich Vollmer (1956)
- Born: Heinrich Vollmer; January 6, 1885; Württemberg, German Empire
- Died: January 7, 1961 (aged 76)
- Occupation(s): inventor, engineer

Heinrich Vollmer (1885 in Altdorf, Esslingen–1961 in Tübingen) was a German small-arms designer.

Vollmer began his manufacturing career by making parts for the German copies of the Maxim gun during the First World War. His first innovation was a beltless feed for the MG08/15. It was followed by a somewhat similar device for the MP/18/I submachine gun—this consisted of a 60-round circular, spool magazine that was carried by the soldier on loop on his hip and it was connected to the gun by a flexible hose. (The latter can be seen at the Wehrtechnische Studiensammlung Koblenz (WTS) as item #50008).

In the early 1920s, Vollmer started to develop his own sub-machineguns. His early models, named VPG, VPGa, VPF and VMP1925 were fairly similar to the MP18. The VMP1925 had a wooden handgrip and was fed by a small 25-round drum magazine, connected directly to the gun. The VMP1925 was secretly tested by the Reichswehr, along with competing designs from Schmeisser and Rheinmetall. (The Reichswehr was prohibited by the Versailles Treaty from having sub-machine guns in service, although the German police was allowed to carry a small number.) Secret funding was given to Vollmer to continue development, and this resulted in the VMP1926, which mostly differed from its predecessor by the removal of the cooling jacket. A subsequent development was the VMP1928, which introduced a 32-round box magazine sticking from the left side. The final development of this series was the VMP1930. (It can also be seen at the WTS.) This model introduced a substantive innovation—a telescoping main spring assembly, which made the gun more reliable and easier to assemble and disassemble in the field. Vollmer applied for a patent for his innovation in 1930 and it was granted in 1933 as DRP# 580620. His company, Vollmer Werke, produced however only about 400 of these, and most were sold to Bulgaria. In late 1930, the Reichswehr stopped supporting Vollmer financially; consequently he sold the rights to all his designs to the company known as Erfurter Maschinenfabrik (ERMA), which continued development as the EMP.

Vollmer also designed some machine guns. His initial work on this area may have begun as early as 1916. In 1927 he designed the VMG 1927 and developed it later in collaboration with Mauser into MV 31 (Mauser-Vollmer 1931). This gun however was not adopted for service. Instead the MG 34 general-purpose machine gun (GPMG), also developed by Vollmer, but on the basis of the Solothurn S2-100 (MG 30) would eventually equip the German military in large numbers.

Between 1935 and 1938 Vollmer also worked on a series of prototype assault rifles, known as the Vollmer M35, which were chambered in an intermediate cartridge co-developed with Gustav Genschow & Company (GECO).

== Bibliography ==
- Götz, Hans Dieter: German Military Rifles and Machine Pistols, 1871–1945, Schiffer Publishing, Ltd. West Chester, Pennsylvania, 1990. (OCLC 24416255)
- Smith, W.H.B: Small arms of the world – the basic manual of military small arms, Harrisburg, Pa., Stackpole Books, 1955. (OCLC 3773343)
- Günter Wollert; Reiner Lidschun; Wilfried Kopenhagen: Illustrierte Enzyklopädie der Schützenwaffen aus aller Welt – Schützenwaffen heute (1945–1985), Berlin, Militärverlag der Deutschen Demokratischen Republik, 1988. (OCLC 19630248)
- Ezell, Edward Clinton: Small arms of the world, Eleventh Edition, Arms & Armour Press, London, 1977
