= List of equipment of the Spanish Army =

This is a List of current equipment of the Spanish Army.

== Infantry equipment ==
Weapon	Image	Origin	Notes
Combat knife
KCB–77 M1		Germany; Spain	It is used with the G-36E assault rifle.
Semi-automatic pistol
Heckler & Koch USP		Germany	The USPs of the German manufacturer Heckler & Koch were acquired in 2011 for 4.1 million euros and delivered until 2013.
Glock 43		Austria	Used in smaller numbers.
Submachine gun
Heckler & Koch MP5		Germany	Both the UMP-9 (in 9 mm Parabellum) and the UMP-45 (in .45 ACP) versions are in use by the Special Operations Command.
Heckler & Koch UMP		Germany	Both the UMP-9 (in 9 mm Parabellum) and the UMP-45 (in .45 ACP) versions are in use by the Special Operations Command.
Heckler & Koch MP7		Germany	Used by Special Operations Groups.
FN P90		Belgium	Used by Special Operations Groups.
Assault rifle
Heckler & Koch G36E		Spain	Standard issue rifle, produced under license by Santa Bárbara Sistemas since 1999, alongside variants G36KE and G36CE; equipped without integral red dot sight, instead with a Picatinny Rail to mount an EoTech holographic sight.
Heckler & Koch HK417		Germany	G28 variants in use.
Sniper rifle
Accuracy International Arctic Warfare		United Kingdom	Precision rifle in two versions, each with a different caliber, the AW308 in 7.62 × 51 mm NATO and the AW50 in 12.7 × 99 mm NATO (.50 BMG).
Barrett M95		United States	These rifles were supplied as standard with two types of riflescopes: the Austrian Swarovski Optik Habicht PF 10X42L for daytime use and the NVIS (night vision system) KN202FAB from the Norwegian manufacturer Simrad Optronics A/S.
Machine gun
Heckler & Koch MG4		Germany	Standard issue LMG.
Heckler & Koch MG5		Germany	Used by Special Operations Groups.
Rheinmetall MG3		Germany	Standard issue medium machine gun.
FN MAG		Belgium	Machine gun in NATO caliber 7.62 × 51 mm, manufactured by the Belgian company FN Herstal. As part of the FAMET helicopter crews.
M-60 machine gun		United States	7.62 × 51 mm NATO machine gun, installed in FAMET Chinooks and Netón Mk.2 special operations vehicles.
Browning M2		United States	Caliber 12.7 × 99 mm NATO. The original models were modernized to the Quick Change Barrel (QCB) version. They are equipped with the 237 MGS+/3x/120 holographic sight from the American company IntelliOptix.
Grenade launcher
Heckler & Koch AG-36		Germany	40 mm single-shot grenade launcher for the G-36E assault rifle.
SB LAG 40		Spain	40 mm automatic grenade launcher can be used from the ground with a tripod and mounted on helicopters or vehicles such as the VAMTAC , the Iveco LMV Lince , the BMR or the M-113.
Mk 19 grenade launcher		United States	Mod. 3. Version, "Advanced Grenade Launcher," of the Mk-19, an automatic 40 mm grenade launcher. Its maximum range is 1,500 meters when used against point targets and 2,050 meters against area targets.
Anti-tank rocket launcher
C-100 Alcotán		Spain	The Army has more than 900 rocket launchers, as well as nearly 300 VOSEL firing guides, 23 simulators, and 53 training devices.
C-90 CR		Spain	The C-90 rocket-propelled 90 mm grenade launcher is a disposable, shoulder-fired launcher that can be carried by a single infantryman. It features a VN38-C night vision device.
Spike		Israel	To replace the MILAN missile. Total 2,630 Spike LR (including 260 launchers and associated training systems) and 200 Spike ER missiles (for use by Eurocopter Tiger attack helicopters). A total of 236 launchers and 2,360 Spike LR missiles was assigned to the Spanish Army, while the remaining 24 launchers and 240 missiles was assigned to the Spanish Marines.
TOW 2A		United States	The Army acquired 200 TOW-LWL (Light Weight Launcher) launchers with second-generation thermal imaging cameras from ENOSA, as well as 2,000 BGM-71 TOW 2A rockets, which were delivered starting in 1996. 68 of these launchers are mounted on combat vehicles such as the VAMTAC, BMR or M-113.
Mortar
EIMOS / 81mm		Germany	In a first phase, the Ministry of Defence will purchase 258 Eimos mortars from Expal for 125 million euros.
ECIA L65/60		Spain	30 sold to the Uruguayan National Army.
ECIA L65/81		Spain	1,040 ECIA L-65/81 medium 81mm mortars, including 446 vehicle-mounted. 120 were sold to the Uruguayan National Army in 2014.
ECIA L65/105		Spain	
ECIA L65/120		Spain	449 ECIA L-65/120 heavy mortars with a caliber of 120 mm were delivered, of which 60 were sold to the Uruguayan National Army in 2014. Of the remaining 110 are mounted on armored vehicles.

== Tanks ==
=== Main Battle tanks ===
Model	Image	Origin	Quantity	Notes
Leopard 2A8		Germany		The army plans to replace its fleet of Leopard 2A4 tanks with the most modern version 2A8
Leopard 2E		Spain	219	In 2023, the Spanish government approved a contract worth 208 million euros to carry out some modernizations of the Leopard 2E tanks.
Leopard 2A4		Germany	55	108 were acquired from Germany. 29 were handed over to Ukraine. It was planned to convert 40 of these machines, 24 into engineer versions and a further 16 into bridge-laying versions. 25 more in storage.

== Armoured fighting vehicles ==
Model	Image	Origin	Variant	Type	Quantity	Notes
Centauro		Italy		Wheeled tank destroyer	84	105 mm cannon and 7.62 mm coaxial
VEC-M1		Spain		Cavalry scout vehicle	135	Will be replaced by VCR 8x8 Dragon
Pizarro (ASCOD)		Spain; Austria	VCI/C	Infantry fighting vehicle	204	30 mm cannon and 7.62 mm coaxial
Pizarro (ASCOD)		Spain; Austria	VCPC	Command and communications vehicles	21	
Bandvagn 206		Sweden	Bv206 Bv206s	Tracked articulated vehicle	47 20	
M113		United States	M113A1; M113A2; M577A2	Tracked Armored personnel carrier	800	Replaced by VAC
Tracked support vehicle / VAC	VAC vehicle	Spain	Pizarro (ASCOD)	Support Vehicle	36/394	In 2023, the Spanish government approved the launch of a contract to produce 394 vehicles worth almost €2 billion. 1st phase 394 VAC (2026-2035): 114 Armoured Personnel Carriers; 34 Anti Tank; 36 PC Vehicle; 12 Forward Observer Vehicle; 92 Pick up Cargo; 12 Armoured Cargo; 40 SP Mortars; 22 Ambulance; 12 Engineering Combat Vehicle; 22 Recovery
Pegaso BMR		Spain	BMR-600; BMR-600M1	Wheeled Armored personnel carrier	648	12.70 mm machine gun; Will be replaced by VCR 8x8 Dragon
VCR 8x8 Dragon		Spain		Wheeled Armored personnel carrier	119/348	Planned 998 (348 in the first phase, 365 in the second and 285 in the third) Spain has ordered 348 Dragón vehicles in the first phase.: 219 Infantry fighting vehicles; 49 Engineer combat vehicles; 14 Command vehicles; 8 Forward observers; 58 Reconnaissance vehicles
RG-31 Nyala		South Africa		Infantry mobility vehicle MRAP	150	12.70 mm or 7.62 mm MG-3 machine gun and LAG-40 grenade launcher; Will be replaced by VCR 8x8 Dragon

== Light vehicles ==
Model	Image	Origin	Type	Quantity	Notes
Iveco LMV		Spain	Infantry mobility vehicle	346	It can carry a 7.62 or 12.70 mm machine gun; should be replaced by URO VAMTAC
URO VAMTAC		Spain	All Terrain 4x4 tactical vehicle	+3000	Patrol; Ambulance; Support, Logistic; Closed Reconnaissance; Utility; CBRN defense; EIMOS 81mm MORTAR System
Santana Anibal		Spain	an all terrain 4x4 utility vehicle	1000	A total of around 3,050 units were purchased. Will be replaced by the Iturri VMTT Landtrek
Quatripol Q-150D		Spain	an all terrain 4x4 utility vehicle	20	The Quatripole Q-150D is a Spanish air-droppable, light, all-terrain, unarmored tactical transport vehicle
EINSA MM-1A Mk-2 Falcata		Spain	Light utility vehicle	29	They offer space for six fighters or two stretchers and can also be equipped with weapons in holders
EINSA Netón		Spain	unarmored light tactical vehicle	24	The Netón is a Spanish unarmored light tactical transport vehicle used by special forces
Nissan		JapanSpain	Utility vehicle	1200	Terrano; Patrol; Navara; Pathfinder
Iturri VMTT Landtrek		FranceSpain	Utility vehicle	600/4500	Militarized version (VMTT stands for Military Tactical All-Terrain Vehicle) of the commercial off-road vehicle Peugeot Landtrek, developed by the Spanish company Iturri.
Ford Ranger (T6)		United States	Mid-size pickup truck		New off-road vehicle for the army
Citroën Jumpy		France	Light commercial vehicle	68	Purchase of electric vans in 2023 for 3 million euros

== Logistics vehicles ==
Model	Image	Origin	Type	Quantity	Notes
URO		Spain	Light Truck		URO Vamtac SK95; URO 115pm; URO MT149; URO MAT18.14
Iveco EuroCargo		Italy	Light Truck		
Iveco-Pegaso		Spain; Italy	Medium Truck		Different versions
Iveco Trakker		Spain; Italy	Medium Truck		Iveco-Pegaso EuroTrakker MP380E37H
Renault Trucks		France	Heavy Truck 8x4	50/293	240 Vempar logistics trucks; 32 logistics dump trucks; 21 aircraft refueling units
Iveco		Italy	Heavy Truck		Different versions
M-548		United States	Ammunition transporter	158	Armored. In addition Spain has 18 M548/6 SEM-1I vehicles.

== Engineering & Maintenance vehicles ==
Model	Image	Origin	Type	Quantity	Notes
CZ-10/25E		Spain	Armoured engineering vehicle	38	M-60 CZ 10/25E Alacrán engineer tank based on the M-60A1 chassis
Pizarro CEV (Castor)		Spain	Armoured engineering vehicle	36	The Army planned to procure 47 engineer combat vehicles in the second phase of the Pizarro program. This number varied in the first contract amendment, rising to 48 units, but was ultimately reduced to just 36 in the second amendment
Leopard REC		Germany	Armoured recovery vehicle	16	The Büffel, Buffalo or Leopard 2ER is the recovery version of the Leopard 2 tank
M47ER3		United States	Armoured recovery vehicle	22	M47ER3 – Spanish armored recovery vehicle
BMR M1 VCZ		Spain	Armoured recovery vehicle	33	Similar version to the M-113 VCZ, in this case built on a BMR chassis
Centauro REC		Italy	Armoured recovery vehicle	4	Four units of the recovery version of the VBM Freccia (derived from the Centauro) were acquired, arriving in July 2011, and the number is expected to be increased by at least two more in the future. This variant, of which the ET is the first worldwide user, is known in Spain as the Centauro VCREC. It is equipped with a thruster/stabilizer blade, a crane, and two winches (one main and one auxiliary), as well as two machine guns for self-protection
Maxxpro		United States	Armoured recovery vehicle	14	Armored MRAP (Mine Resistant and Improvised Ordnance Disposal) recovery vehicle, purchased used by the US Army.
M113		United States	Armoured recovery vehicle	60	Converted in Spain by Santa Bárbara from standard models into the VCZ (Sapper Combat Vehicle) version by adding a pusher bucket and a 7.5 tonne winch
M60 VLPD		United States	Vehicle launched bridge	12	12 vehicles equipped with the German Leguan bridge. This bridge has the advantage over the M-60 AVLB in that it slides and is therefore less conspicuous than the first, which had to be raised for use.
M3 Amphibious Rig		Germany	Amphibious bridging vehicle		The Spanish Army has purchased the GDELS M3 amphibious bridge and will receive the first units in 2026
Husky 2G		South Africa	Mine clearance vehicle	6	A vehicle from the American company NIITEK (Non-Intrusive Inspection Technology), equipped with a front-axle-mounted Visor 2500 ground-penetrating radar from the same company CSI (Critical Solutions International) for detecting buried explosives. In 2012, six units of the Husky 2G version were purchased for €12.76 million, which were received at the end of the same year.
Caterpillar Inc. D7R-II		United States			Medium slider on tracks. Available in armored and unarmored versions

== Artillery ==
Model	Image	Origin	Type	Quantity	Notes
K9 Thunder		South Korea	155mm Self-propelled howitzer	0/128	128 ordered in August 2026 to replace the M109. The order also includes 120 ammunition vehicles, 11 command-and-fire-control vehicles and 21 recovery vehicles.
M109A5E		United States	155mm Self-propelled gun	96	M109A5
SBS 155/52		Spain	155mm Field gun	82	16 operated by the Coastal Artillery Group I/4 of the Coastal Artillery Regiment No. 4
L118		United Kingdom	105mm Field gun	56	L118A1 replaces the OTO Melara Mod 56
VAMTAC		Spain	81mm Mortar carrier	10	Equipped with Cardom MORTAR
Silam		Israel	Rocket launcher PULS	0/12	System of the temporary joint venture (UTE) between Escribano and Rheinmetall Expal Munitions, developed based on the PULS system from the Israeli company Elbit Systems, mounted on an Iveco 8×8 truck, with Escribano's Aspis remote control turret and GMV's Talos fire control system. It will be equipped with two batteries of six launchers each. They will have 16 Accular containers (288 missiles with a range of 35 kilometers), 28 Extra (112 guided missiles with a range of 150 kilometers), and 32 Predator (64 missiles with a range of 300 kilometers).

== Air defence ==
Model	Image	Origin	Variant	Type	Quantity	Notes
Oerlikon-Contraves GDF-005/007 35/90		Switzerland	Anti-aircraft artillery	35mm	92	18 renewed Skyguard and 27 Skydor fire directions
MIM-23B I-Hawk Phase III		United States	Surface-to-Air missile		32	
NASAMS		United States	Surface-to-Air missile system	AIM-120 AMRAAM	8	AN/MPQ-64 Sentinel 3D-Radar
Raytheon MIM-104 Patriot(PAC-2)		United States	Surface-to-Air missile	PAC2 PAC3+	18	purchased from Germany on MAN Trucks
MBDA Mistral missile		France	Anti-aircraft infrared homing missile system	Mistral 1	168	Purchase of 100 used Mistral 3 rockets from France worth 47,795,000 euros starting in 2020
Thales Raven 2D-Radar		Netherlands	2D-Radar			for MBDA Mistral missile

== Helicopters ==
Model	Image	Origin	Type	Variant	Quantity	Notes
Eurocopter Tiger		Europe	Attack helicopter	HAD-E	18	Helicopter upgrade planned
CH-47 Chinook		United States	Transport helicopter			
CH-47 Chinook		United States	Transport helicopter	CH-47F	17	
AS332 Super Puma		Europe	Transport helicopter	AS332B	14	
AS532 Cougar		France	Transport helicopter	AS532AL	6	
AS532 Cougar		France	Transport helicopter	AS532UL	11	
NH-90		Europe	Transport helicopter	TTH	26/39	(Batch 1: 16) (Batch 2: 10) (Batch 3: 13)
Bell 212		United States	Transport helicopter		6	The Army receives the first AB-212+ helicopter from the Navy in Tenerife
Eurocopter H135		Europe	Transport helicopter	T2 and T2+	12	

== Unmanned aerial vehicles ==
Model	Image	Origin	Type	Variant	Quantity	Notes
Vector UAV Quantum-Systems		Germany	Unmanned aerial vehicle	Vector, Twister	3/91 planned	91 Vector systems, each comprising two drones for a total of 182 UAVs
RQ-11 Raven		United States	Mini UAV		72	
IAI Searcher		Israel	UAV	MK II-J MK III	3 1	
Fulmar X		Spain	Mini UAV		2	Range of eight hours and distances of 800 kilometers
Sirtap		Spain Colombia	Drone		27 planned	The Sirtap is an unmanned aerial vehicle for surveillance and reconnaissance, jointly developed by Airbus D&S Spain and the Colombian CIAC, whose study began in 2017

== See also ==
- Army of Spain (Peninsular War)
- FAMET
- Spanish Legion
- Spanish Republican Army
- Coats of Arms, Badges and Emblems of the Spanish Army
- List of military weapons of Spain

== Bibliography ==
- Instruction no. 59/2005, of 4 April 2005, from the chief of the army staff on army organisation and function regulations, published in B.O.D. NO. 80 of 26 April 2005
- International Institute for Strategic Studies (12 February 2025). The Military Balance 2025. London: Routledge. ISBN 978-1-003-63076-0.
- Lehardy, Diego, Spanish Army in a difficult phase of its transformation, RID magazine, July 1991.
- Mogaburo López, Fernando (2017). Historia Orgánica De Las Grandes Unidades (1475–2018) (PDF). Madrid: Ministerio de Defensa – Mando de Adiestramiento y Doctrina.
- Scianna, Bastian Matteo (2019). "Stuck in the past? British views on the Spanish army's effectiveness and military culture, 1946–1983". War and Society. 38 (1): 41–56. doi:10.1080/07292473.2019.1524347. S2CID 159007579. Antiquated material and limited budgets were not the only reasons for the army's low potential wartime capability after World War II. "..Spain continued to field around twenty divisions, whereas the defence industry and available national resources could only sustain six operational divisions. A regular Spanish infantry division could muster full strength with modern infantry weapons, while other ‘teeth’ units – like the artillery and engineers – were reduced to one-third of their ideal levels. The supporting ‘tail’ was so underdeveloped that divisions were statically bound to their home depot and could only defend their military district after six months mobilisation.." [The paper] draws on British and German sources to demonstrate how Spanish military culture prevented an augmented effectiveness and organisational change.
