= List of military weapons of Spain =

These are lists of weapons used by the Spanish Army, one of the world's oldest armies, with its history dating back to the 16th century.

- List of weapons of the Spanish–American War
- List of Spanish Civil War weapons of the Nationalists
- List of Spanish Civil War weapons of the Republicans
- List of World War II weapons of Spain
- List of Cold War weapons and land equipment of Spain
- List of equipment of the Spanish Army
