= List of Cold War weapons and land equipment of Spain =

This is a list of Cold War weapons and land equipment of Spain. Spain was a dictatorship under Francisco Franco until 1975, when it began its transition to democracy after Franco's death. Spain joined NATO in 1982.

== Small arms ==
=== Rifles ===
- Mauser Model 1893: known as the Spanish Mauser, some were still in frontline use in the 1950s, meaning the rifle had been in Spanish service for 60 years.
- Spanish M43: main Spanish weapon in the 1950s, copy of the World War II-era Karabiner 98k from Germany.
- FR8: conversion of Spanish Mausers and Karabiner 98k rifles as training rifles until enough of the CETME rifles were in stock to train all recruits. Chambered in 7.62×51mm NATO. Saw use in the Guardia Civil, the Spanish Gendarmerie, into the 1970s.
- CETME rifle: the main Spanish Cold War assault rifle entered service in the early 1960s. Designed by the German Ludwig Vorgrimler while he was working for the Spanish CETME arms company, it later became the basis for Germany's own main Cold War service rifle, the Heckler & Koch G3.

=== Machine guns ===
- ALFA M44: created during World War II in Spain and the main Spanish Cold War machine gun.
- CETME Ameli: entered service in the early 1980s.

=== Submachine guns ===
- Star Model Z-45: Spanish submachine gun based on the MP 40, saw service in the 1950s.

=== Infantry anti-tank weapon ===
- 88.9mm Instalaza M65 Bazooka: improved Spanish variant of the M20 Super Bazooka which saw a long life in the Spanish Army. Earlier variants called M53 and M58.

== Artillery ==
=== Self propelled ===
- M37 105 mm howitzer motor carriage
- M107 self-propelled gun
- M108 howitzer
- M110 howitzer

== Armoured fighting vehicles (AFV) ==
=== Light tanks ===
- Panzer I
- T-26
- BT tank
- M24 Chaffee
- M41 Walker Bulldog

=== Tankettes ===
- L3/35

=== Medium tanks ===
- Panzer IV

=== Tank destroyers ===
- Sturmgeschütz III

=== Main battle tanks (MBT's) ===
- M47 Patton
- M48 Patton
- AMX-30E:Spanish variant of the French AMX-30.

=== Armoured personnel carriers (APC) ===
- M113 armored personnel carrier
- Pegaso BMR: made by Spain.
