= VEC-M1 =

Spanish wheeled reconnaissance vehicle

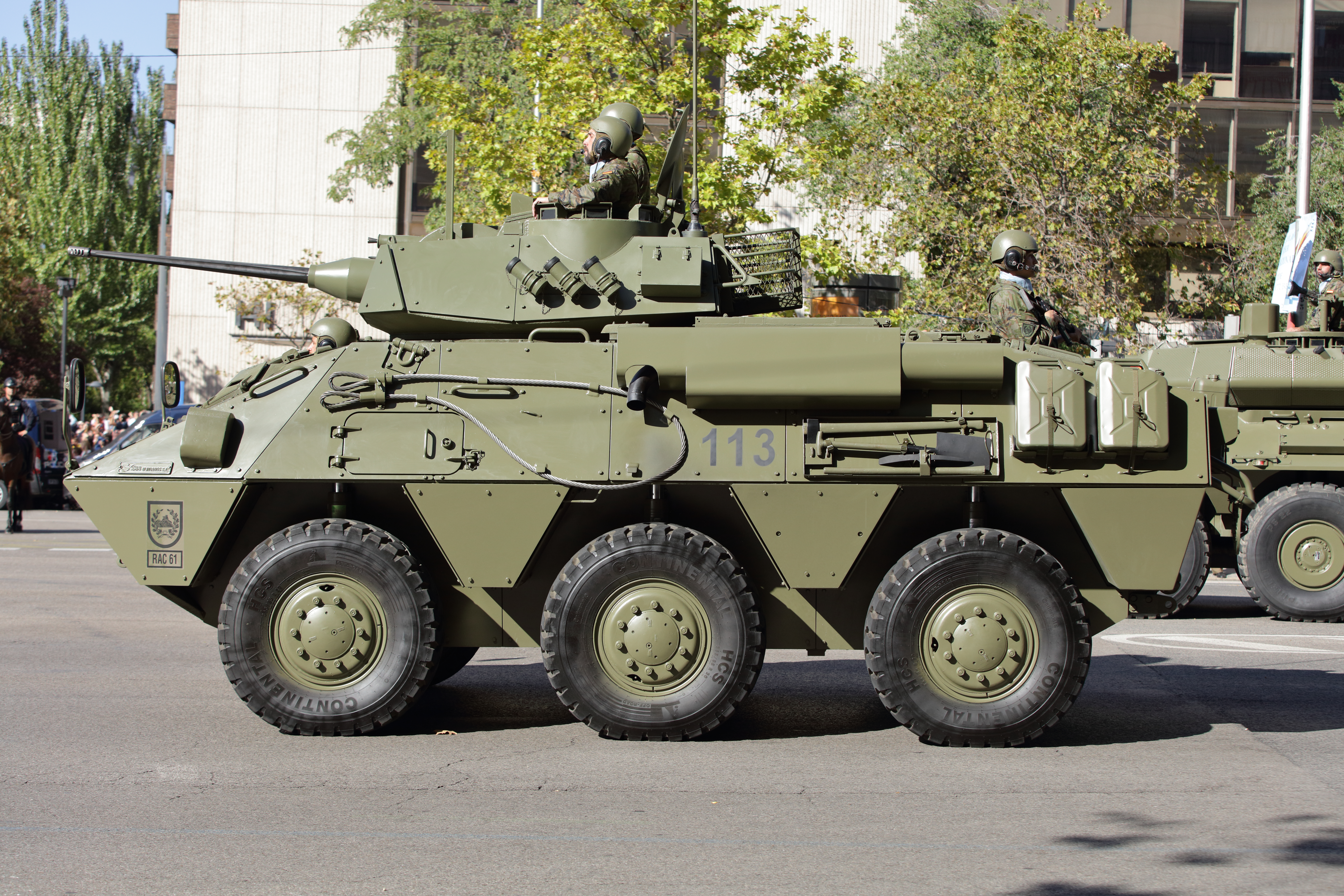
- Spanish Army's VEC in Spanish Armed Forces's day 2022 parade in Madrid
- Type: Armoured fighting vehicle
- Place of origin: Spain

Service history
- In service: 1990s - current
- Wars: Iraq War

Production history
- Unit cost: 483,000 EUR

Specifications
- Mass: 13.7 tonnes (13.5 long tons; 15.1 short tons)
- Length: 6.1 metres (20 ft)
- Width: 2.5 metres (8.2 ft)
- Height: 2.5 metres (8.2 ft)
- Crew: 5 (commander, gunner, driver and two scouts)
- Armor: Steel (turret); Aluminium alloy (hull)
- Power/weight: 19.5 horsepower per tonne (14.5 kW/t)
- Payload capacity: 17 tonnes (17 long tons; 19 short tons)
- Transmission: Six-wheel drive
- Fuel capacity: 400 litres (110 US gal)
- Operational range: 800 kilometres (500 mi)
- Maximum speed: 90 kilometres per hour (56 mph)

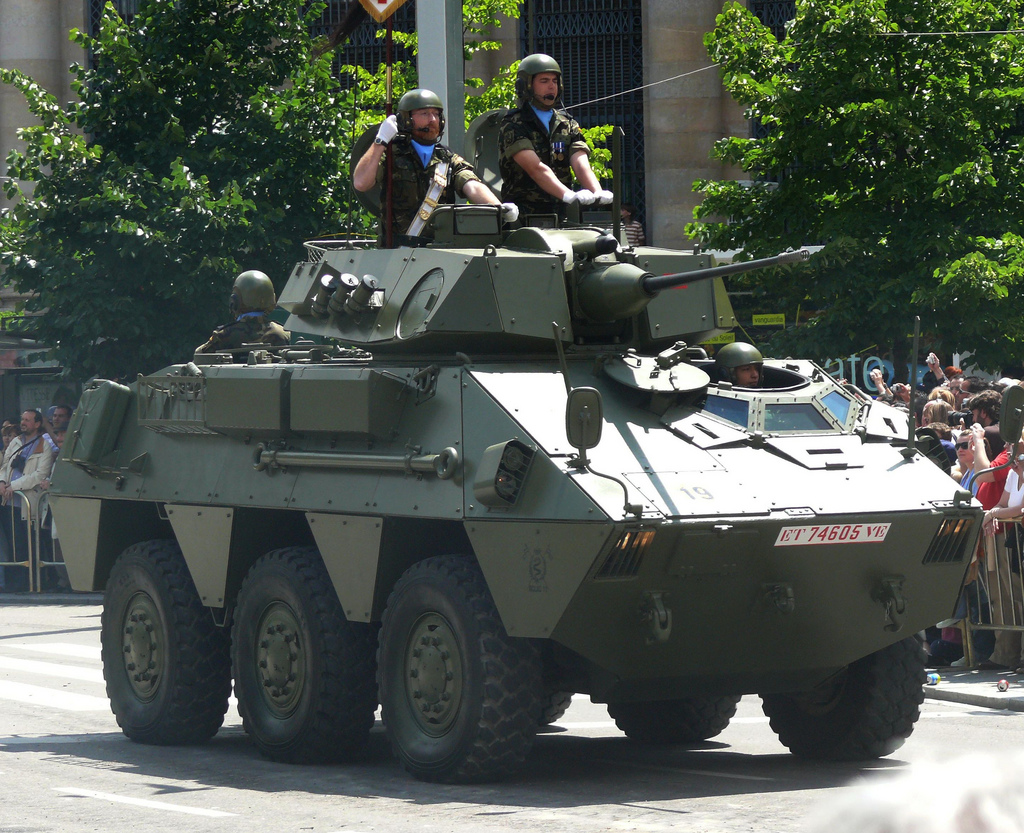
Spanish Army's VEC in Spanish Armed Forces's day 2008 parade in Zaragoza.

The Pegaso VEC-M1 is a Spanish military cavalry reconnaissance vehicle. It started service in the Spanish Army in 1980 as BMR-625 VEC (a.k.a. Pegaso 3562) and all of them were upgraded in late 1990s to the M1 version.

== Technical characteristics ==
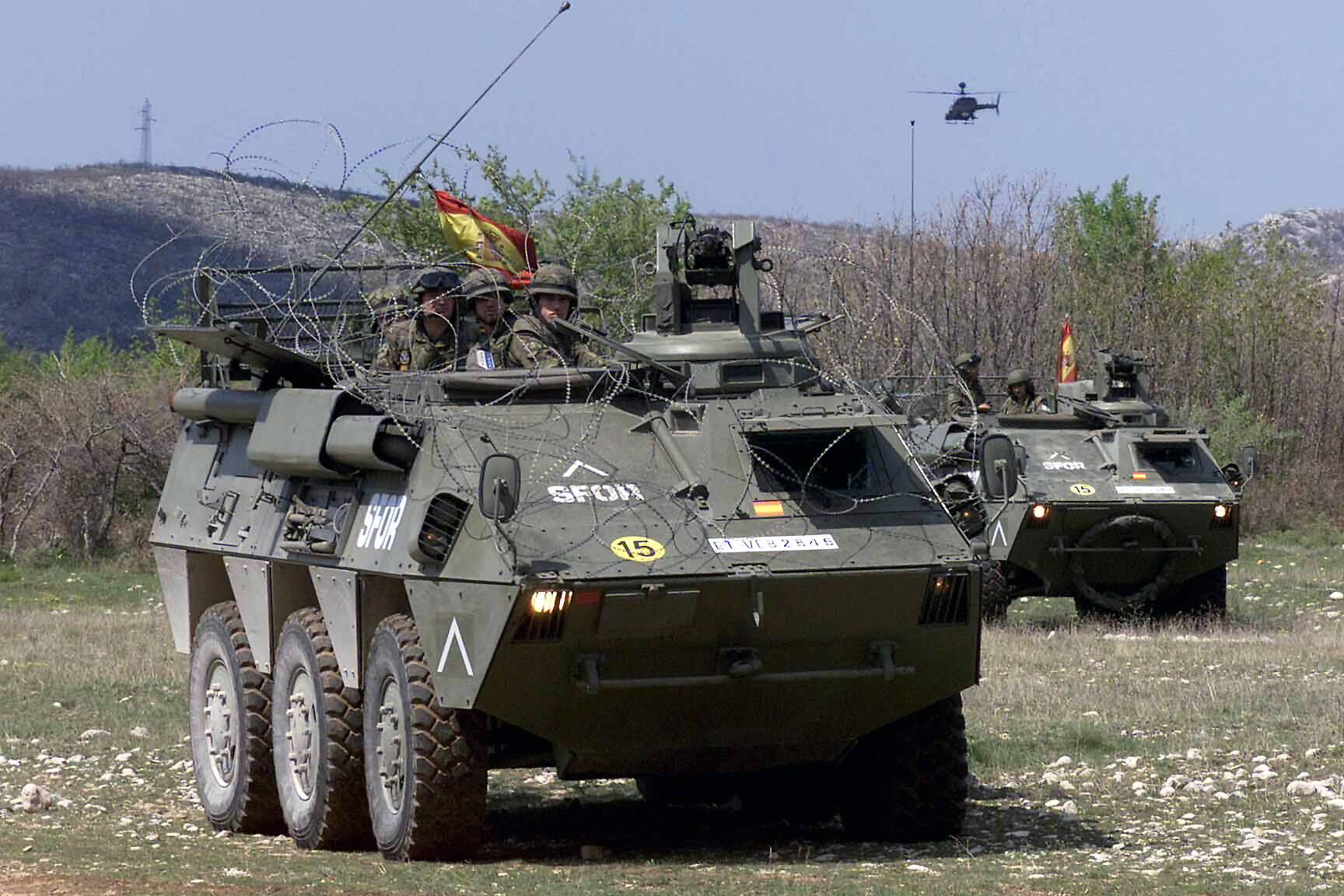
VEC is based on BMR.

The vehicle was developed and produced by Pegaso, now Iveco, as a derivative of the well-known Pegaso BMR. It is a 6x6, currently powered by a 315 hp Scania DS9 diesel 6-cylinder engine, disposed in the rear right side of the hull, which replaced the original Pegaso 306 hp engine.

It mounts an automatic 25 mm chain gun (M242 Bushmaster) into a two-man turret and a coaxial 7.62 mm MG3S machine gun. Six electrically fired smoke grenade launchers are located on the sides of the turret, three on the left side and three on the right. It has amphibious ability, as two hydrojets for displacement in water were an optional equipment.

The crew in composed by five men: the commander, the gunner, the driver and two scouts.

== Operators ==
- Spain: Employed the VEC in combat in the Balkans, Lebanon, Sinai and in the Iraq War, where they were favoured by their crews and command because of their good all-round capabilities, mechanical reliability, armour and firepower.

== See also ==
- List of armoured fighting vehicles by country
