= List of Spanish Civil War weapons of the Nationalists =

This is a list of weapons used by the Nationalist faction of the Spanish Civil War.

== Small arms ==
=== Gas Mask ===
- CMP-33 Gas mask spanish

=== Combat Helmets ===
- M1926 helmet
- M33 helmet (Supplied by Italy)
- Stahlhelm (Supplied by Germany)

=== Knives ===
- Spanish Bayonet Bayoneta Modelo 1893

=== Grenades ===
- Hand Grenade Granada Ferrobellum
- Rifle Grenade Granada De Fusil De La Rabiza
- Smoke Grenade Bote De Humo C.S La Marañosa

=== Rifles ===
- Mauser Model 1893
- Gewehr 98
- Mannlicher M1895
- Mannlicher M1888
- M1870 Italian Vetterli (supplied by Italy)

=== Sidearms ===
- Astra 400
- Astra 900
- Mauser C96

=== Machine guns ===
- Hotchkiss Mle 1914 machine gun
- MG 08
- Chauchat (captured)

=== Submachine guns ===
- MP 28 SMG
- Erma EMP
- Labora Fontbernat M-1938 (captured from the Republicans)

== Artillery ==
=== Field artillery ===
- Canon de 75 modèle 1897
- 7.5 cm FK 16 nA
- 10.5 cm leFH 16
- 10.5 cm leFH 18
- Cannone da 75/27 modello 11
- Cannone da 75/27 modello 12
- Cannone da 105/28 modello 1913
- Obice da 100/17 Mod. 14

=== Heavy artillery ===
- 15 cm sFH 13
- Canon de 155 C modèle 1917 Schneider
- Obice da 149/12

=== Mountain artillery ===
- Cannone da 65/17 modello 13

== Anti-tank guns ==
- 3.7 cm Pak 36
- Bofors 37 mm anti-tank gun

== Anti-aircraft guns ==
- 2 cm Flak 30
- 7.5 cm Flak. L/60
- 8.8 cm Flak 18
- Breda Model 35

== Armoured fighting vehicles (AFV's) ==
- List of tanks in the Spanish Civil War
- BA-3/6 (captured)

== See also ==
- List of Spanish Civil War weapons of the Republicans
