= ALFA M44 =

ALFA M44 machine gun
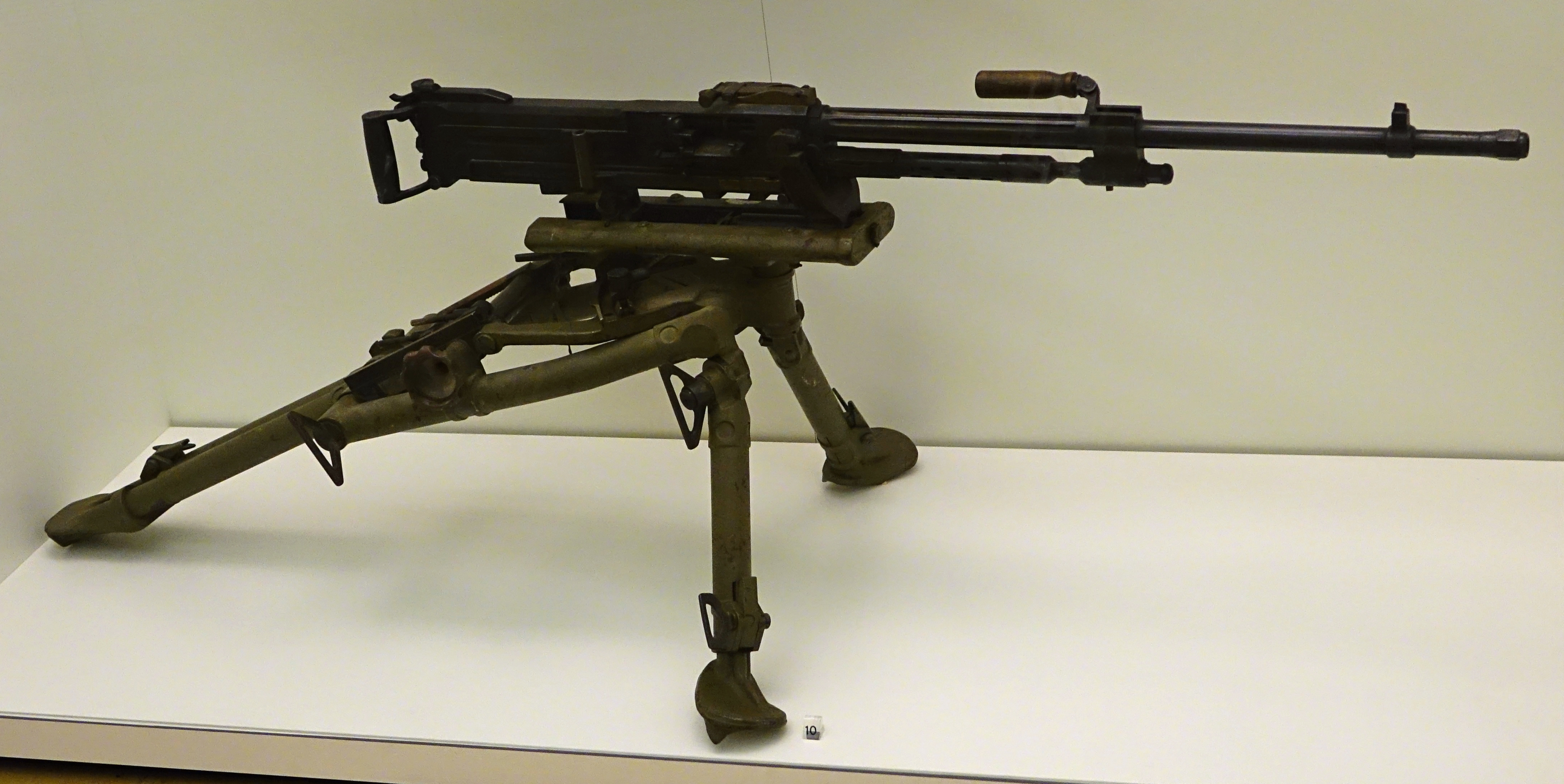
- Type: Medium machine gun
- Place of origin: Spain

Service history
- Used by: Spain; Egypt; Democratic Republic of Congo
- Wars: Ifni War; Suez Crisis; Six-Day War; Simba rebellion

Production history
- Manufacturer: Fabrica de Armas de Oviedo
- Produced: 1944–1962

Specifications
- Mass: 13 kg (28.66 lb)
- Length: 1,450 mm (57.1 in)
- Barrel length: 750 mm (29.5 in)
- Cartridge: 7.62×51mm NATO; 7.92×57mm Mauser
- Action: Gas-Operated; Automatic Fire Only
- Rate of fire: 780 rounds/min
- Muzzle velocity: 760 m/s (2,493 ft/s)
- Feed system: belt
- Sights: rear aperture, front notch

The Alfa M44 was a Spanish machine gun developed during World War II. At this time, stocks of machine guns ran low and no outside source was available. Non-combatant nations found that the belligerent nations were unable to supply as they were preoccupied with meeting their own wartime production needs. It complimented the ZB-26 light machine gun, and replaced the aging Hotchkiss M1914 machine gun. Originally chambered in 7.92×57mm Mauser, in 1955 an updated version chambered in 7.62×51mm NATO was introduced, and was subsequently issued to Spanish troops, sometimes referred to as the M55. Along with Spain, the M44 was also prominently used by Egypt, whose army had standardised on the 7.92×57mm Mauser round. Also in the early 1960s, the Congo government bought a batch of weapons from Spain, including Alfa machine guns, to combat the Simba.

== Gallery ==
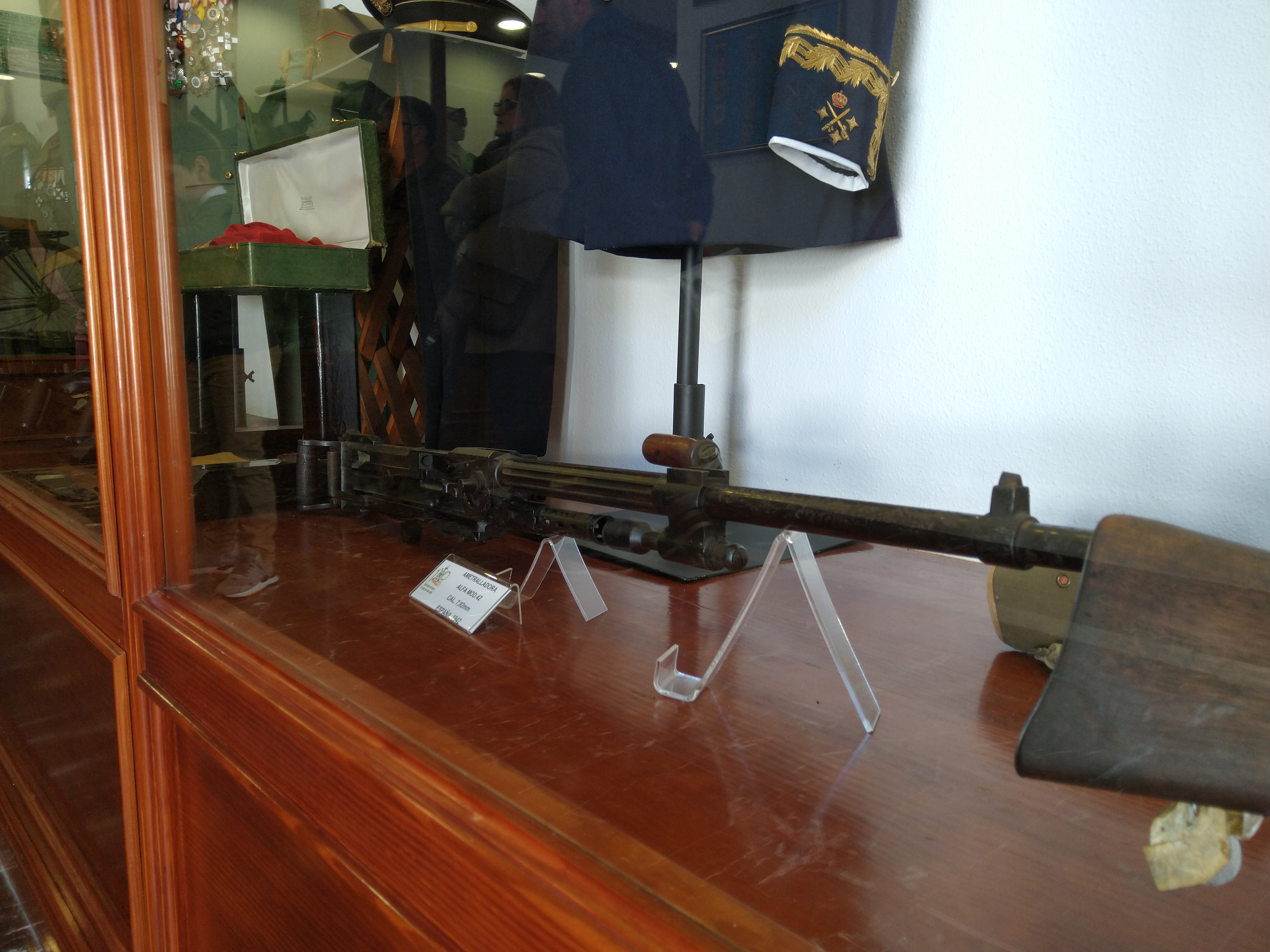
A 1942 prototype in a Spanish museum in Viator, Almeria

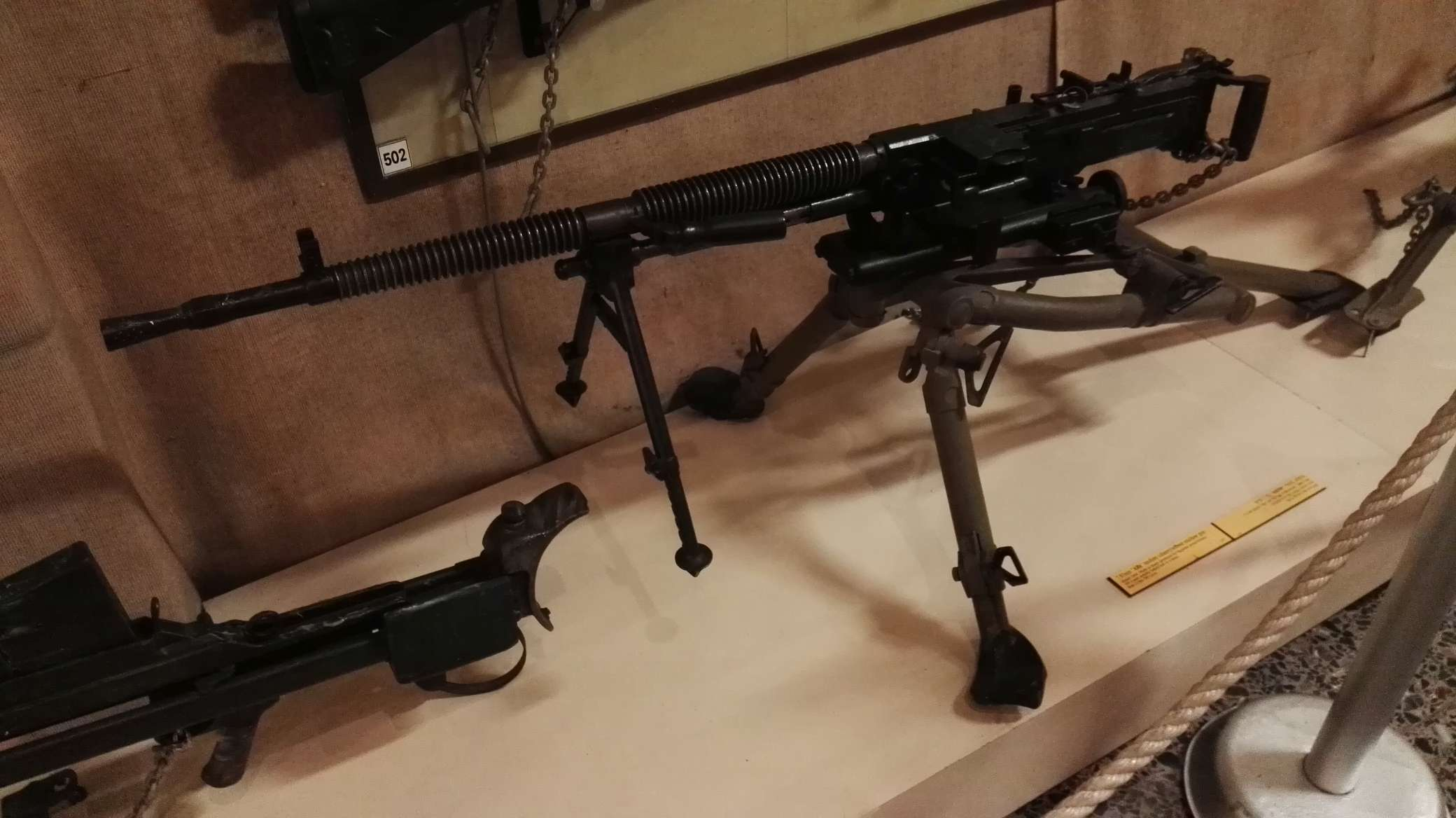
A photo of a tripod-mounted ALFA M44 on display at the Batey ha-Osef Museum, Tel Aviv, Israel

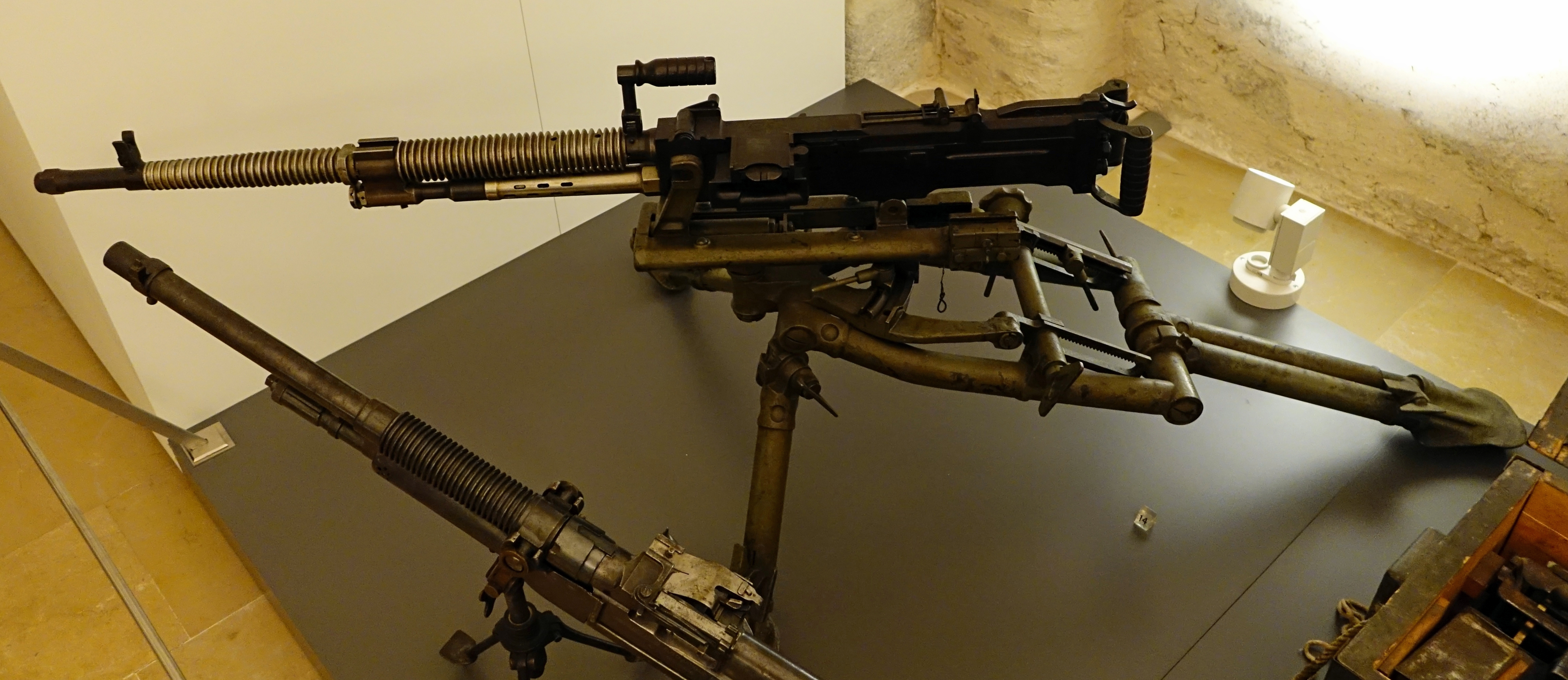
Another photo of a tripod-mounted ALFA, captioned as M55, given that it is chambered for the 7.62×51mm NATO cartridge.

== See also ==
- Breda M37
- ZB-53
- M1919 Browning machine gun
- TADEN gun
- SG-43 Goryunov
