= Pegaso BMR =

Spanish armoured personnel carrier

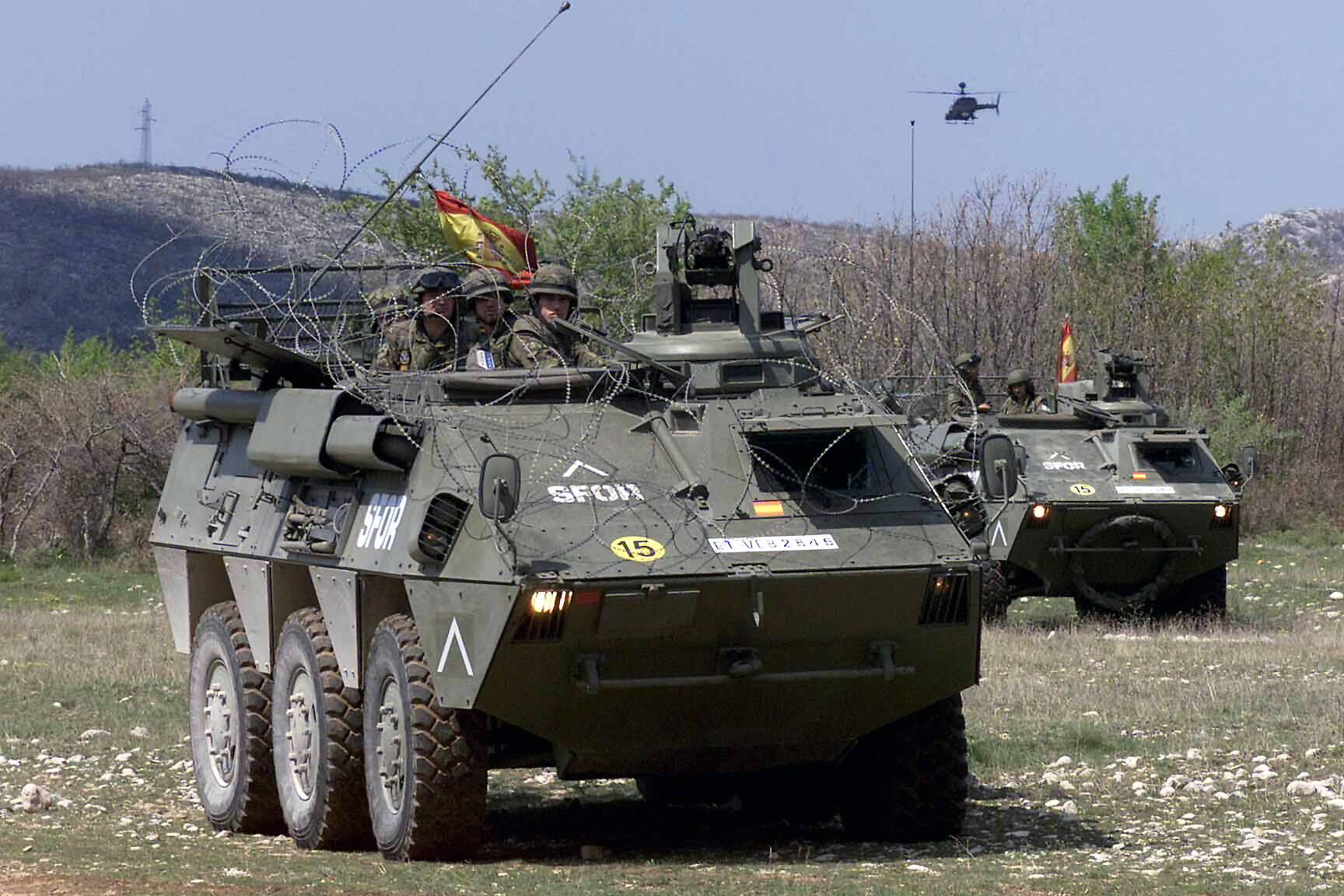
Spanish Army BMR-PPs.

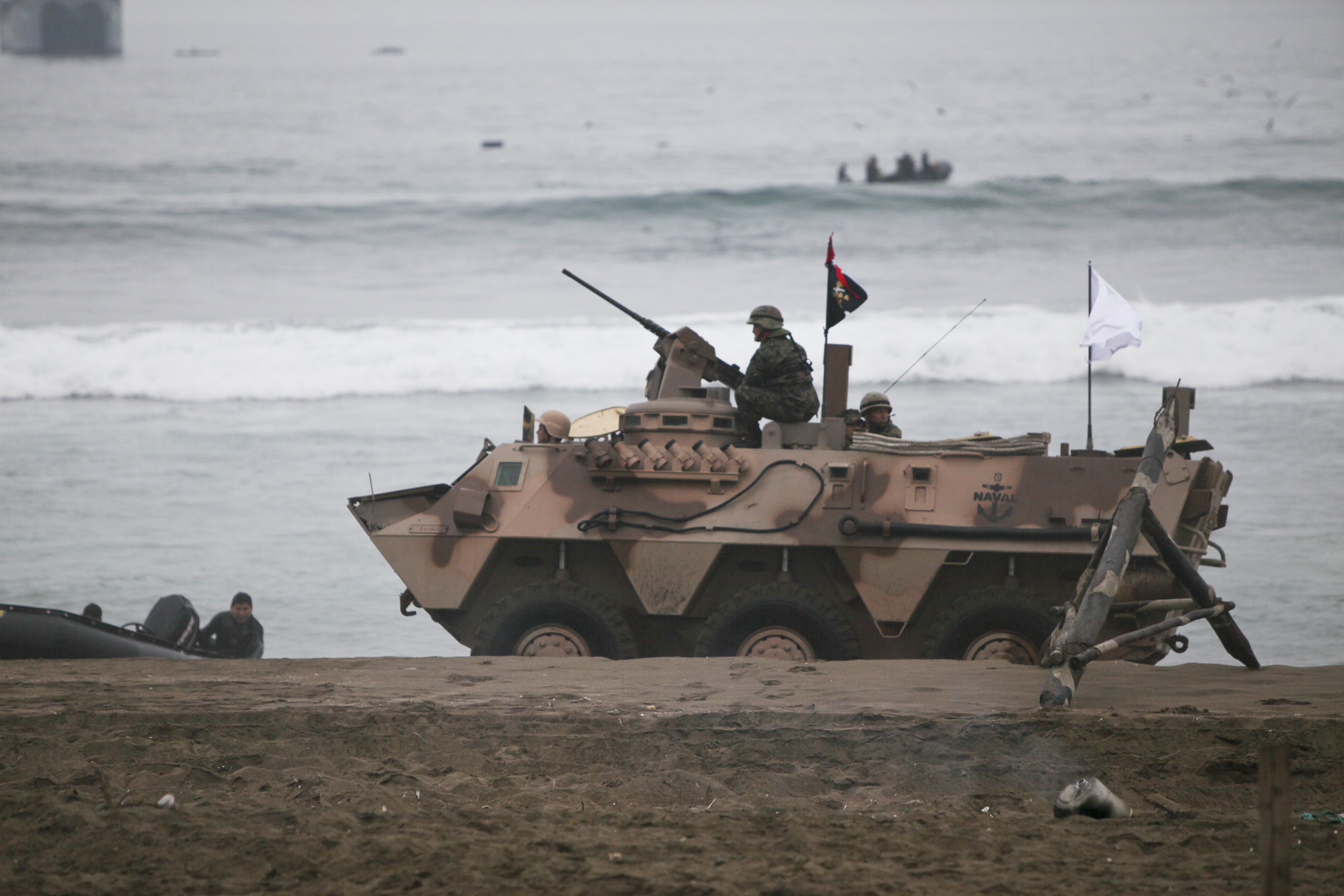
Peruvian Marines on BMR.

The Pegaso 3560 BMR (Spanish acronym of "Blindado Medio sobre Ruedas", "Medium Armored on Wheels") is a 6x6 wheeled armoured personnel carrier produced in Spain by Enasa since 1979.

== Technical characteristics ==
Originally powered by a Pegaso 9157/8 306 hp diesel engine, it has an automatic gearbox, torque converter, independent suspension in all six wheels and amphibious capability. It can also be transported by air. It has received different kind of weapons throughout its life and there is also a field ambulance version. As part of its optional amphibious equipment, it has two hydrojets for travel through water.

Pegaso BMRs are used by Spanish, Egyptian, Saudi Arabian, Moroccan and Peruvian Armies.

The Spanish Army BMRs (or BMR-600) have been instrumental in the performance of Spanish forces in international interventions in Yugoslavia, Afghanistan, Iraq and Lebanon. In the last few years, all of them had their original Pegaso engines replaced by new 310 hp Scania DS9 61A 24S engines, as part of the "BMR 2" programme. Furthermore, the vehicles were fitted with additional passive armour and an air conditioning unit. They are now known as BMR M1.

== Variants ==
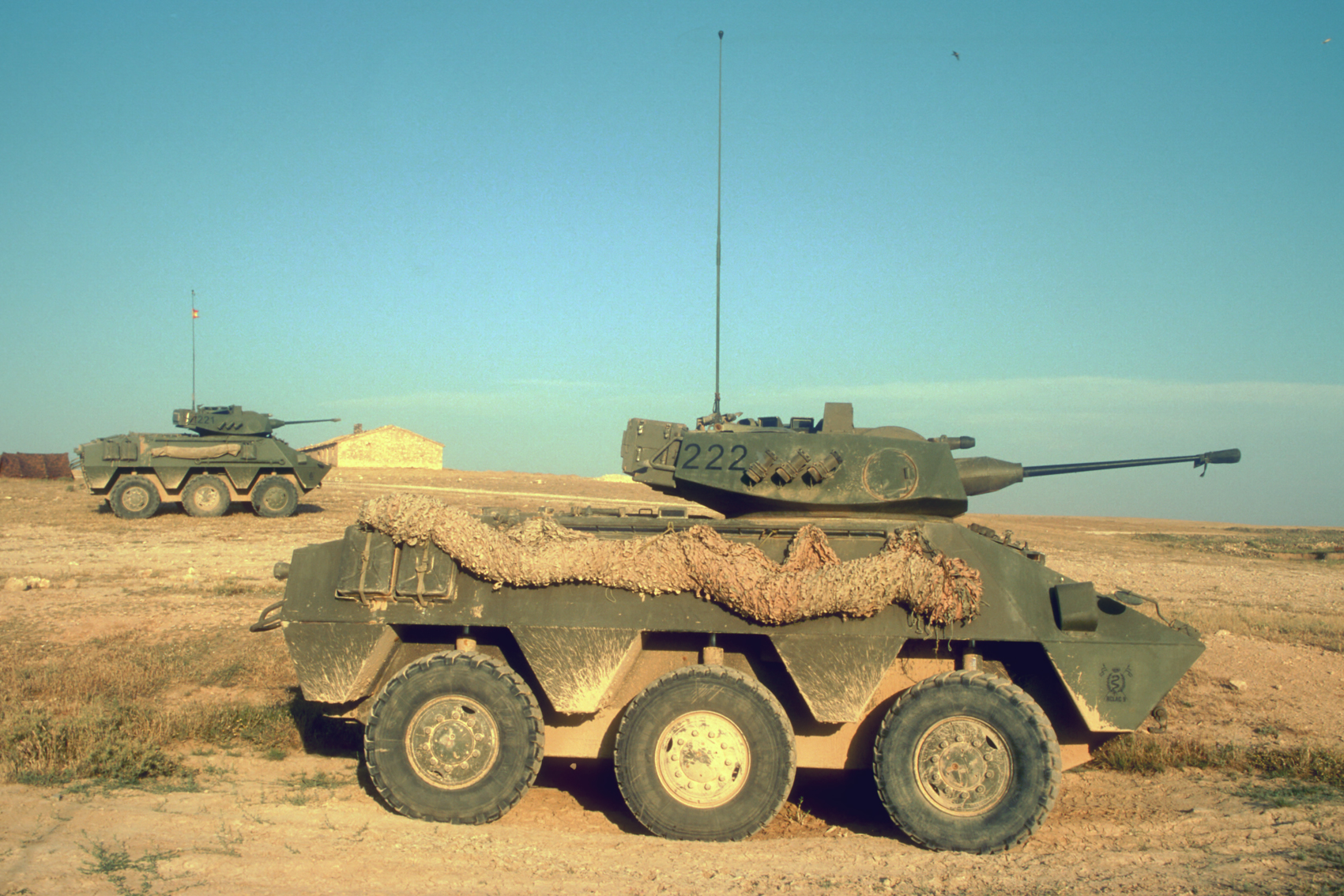
VEC is based on BMR.

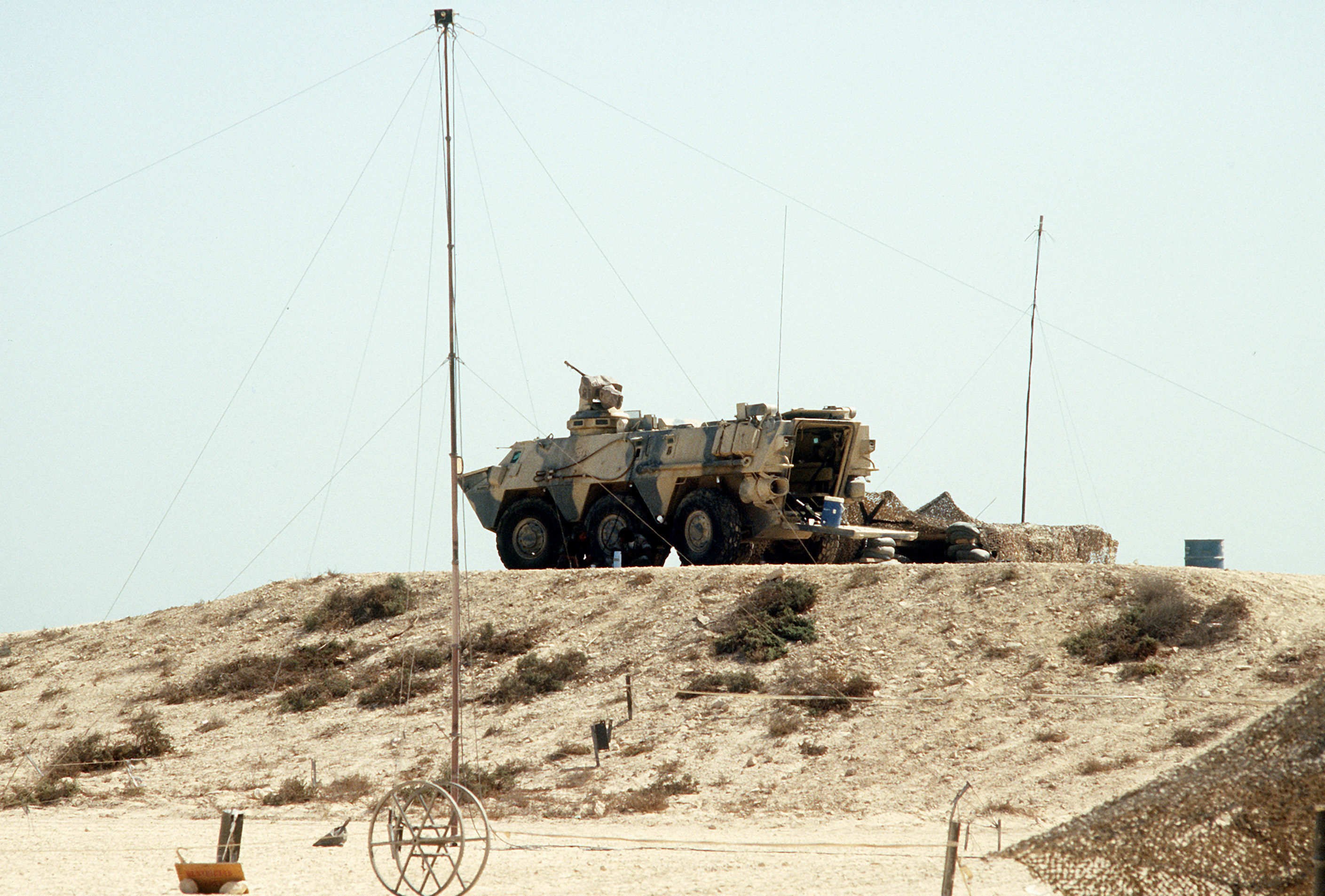
An Egyptian BMR-600 in 1991.

- BMR 3560.50 (BMR-PP) (Porta Personal) - Basic Armoured Personnel Carrier. Can be armed with machine guns, .50cal M2HB, 7.62mm MG1A1 or an automatic grenade launcher 40mm LAG-40.
  - BMR EDEX (Equipo de Desactivación de Explosivos) - Version for Explosive Ordnance Disposal teams, with a higher roofline and special boxes to transport explosives.
  - BMR C/C MILAN - Tank destroyer with MILAN ATGM.
  - BMR C/C TOW - Tank destroyer with TOW ATGM.
  - BMR VCZ (Véhiculo de Combate Zapadores) - Combat engineer vehicle with light bulldozer blade and winch.
  - BMR VRAC-NBQ (Vehículo de Reconocimiento de Áreas Contaminadas) - Nuclear, Biological, Chemical, reconnaissance vehicle.
  - BMR GEL (Guerra Electrónica) - Version fitted with specialised equipment for electronic warfare.
- BMR 3560.51 (BMR-PC) (Puesto de Control) - Command post vehicle.
- BMR 3560.53E (BMR-PM-81) (Portamortero) - Mortar platform with 81 mm mortar LN M-86 and 100 rounds.
- BMR 3560.54 (BMR AMB) (Ambulancias blindadas ) - Ambulance.
- BMR 3560.55 (BMR-Recup) (Recuperación) - Light repair vehicle with crane, winch and tow bars.
- BMR 3560.56 - Signals vehicle.
- BMR 3560.57 - Tank destroyer with HOT ATGM. Prototype.
- BMR 3560.59E (BMR-PM-120) (Portamortero) - Mortar carrier with 120 mm mortar L-65.
- VMA (Vehículo Mecanizado Anfibio) - With improved amphibious capabilities. Prototype.

== Operators ==
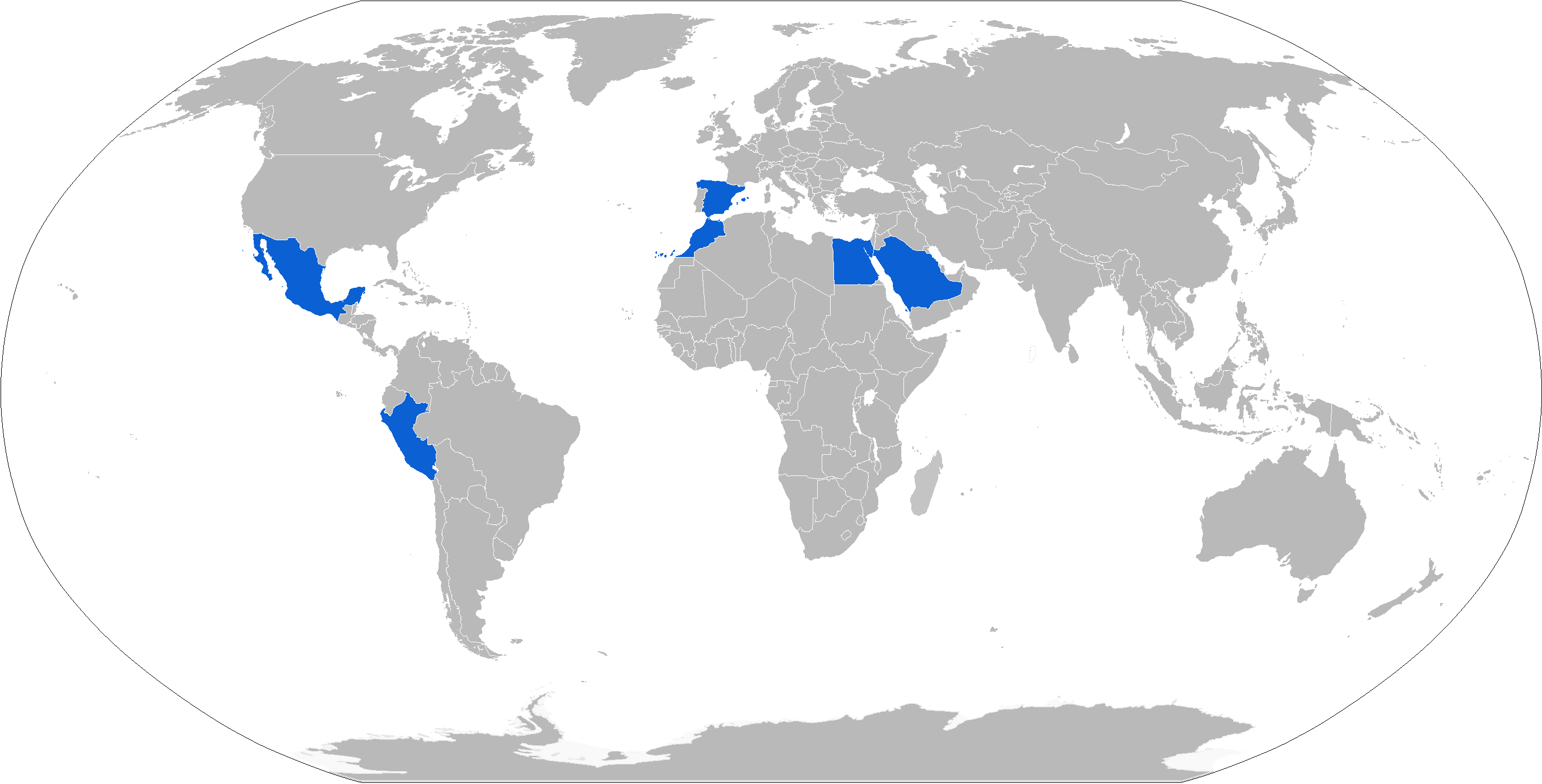
Map of Pegaso BMR operators in blue

- Spain: 682
- Egypt: 260
- Mexico: 7 with the Mexican Marines.
- Peru: 24 (Marines)
- Saudi Arabia: 140 sold to the Royal Saudi Navy in 1983 and 300 locally produced.
- Morocco: 100
- Ukraine: 1 BMR VRAC (Vehículo de Rescate en Áreas Catastróficas) prototype vehicle and 2 prototype/pre-series BRM units converted into armoured ambulances have been donated to Ukraine.

== See also ==
- Pegaso VEC BMR 3562.03
