= List of Spanish Civil War weapons of the Republicans =

This is a list of weapons used by the Spanish Republican side of the Spanish Civil War. The majority of Republican military equipment was obtained through the Soviet Union who supported the Spanish Republicans through shipments of Soviet arms and arms from other countries in the possession of the Soviet Union from past Russian conflicts.

== Small arms ==
=== Gas Mask ===
- CMP-33 Gas mask spanish

=== Combat helmets ===
- M1926 helmet
- Adrian Helmet (Supplied by France)
- SSh-36 (Supplied by the USSR)

=== Knives ===
- Spanish Bayonet Bayoneta Modelo 1893

=== Grenades ===
- Hand Grenade Granada Ferrobellum
- Rifle Grenade Granada De Fusil De La Rabiza
- Smoke Grenade Bote De Humo C.S La Marañosa

=== Rifles ===
==== Bolt Action ====
- Berthier rifle
- Destroyer carbine (scaled-down Mauser Model 1893)
- Fusil Gras mle 1874
- Gewehr 1888
- Karabinek wz. 1929 (purchased from Poland)
- Kropatschek rifle
- Lebel Model 1886 rifle
- Lee–Enfield
- M1870 Italian Vetterli (supplied by the Soviet Union)
- M1917 Enfield
- Mannlicher M1886
- Mannlicher M1888
- Mannlicher M1895
- Mauser Model 1893
- Mosin–Nagant (supplied by Mexico and the Soviet Union)
- Pattern 1914 Enfield
- Ross rifle
- Type 30 rifle
- Type 35 rifle
- Type 38 rifle (Some examples were converted to 8mm Mauser)
- Vz. 24

==== Lever Action ====
- Colt Burgess
- Winchester 1873
- Winchester Model 1895
- Tigre Modelo 1923 (copy of the Winchester Model 1892)

==== Select fire ====
- AVS-36 (supplied by the Soviet Union)

=== Sidearms ===
- Astra 400
- Spanish pinfire revolver knife combination
- Astra 900 (copy from C96)
- Mauser C96
- Nagant 1895
- FN 1922
- Tokarev TT-33
- Bergmann-Bayard

=== Machine guns ===
- Hotchkiss 1909
- Hotchkiss Mle 1914
- Hotchkiss M1922
- Lewis gun
- PM M1910
- Degtyaryov machine gun
- M1918 Browning Automatic Rifle
- Maxim–Tokarev
- Madsen machinegun
- Chauchat
- Ckm wz. 30
- Wz.28 BAR
- M1895 Colt–Browning machine gun
- FM 24/29
- MG15
- SIG KE7
- MG08/15
- ZB 26/30
- Fiat-Revelli
- Schwarzlose
- Saint Étienne 1907

=== Submachine guns ===
- Arsenal Sumachinegun
- Astra machine pistol (copy from m712)
- Erma EMP (Even local copy used)
- Goliat MX35
- Labora Fontbernat M-1938
- MP18
- MP28
- Naranjero (copy of the MP 18)
- PPD-34
- Royal machine pistol
- Star Si 35
- Star RU-35
- Suomi KP/-31
- Thompson

== Artillery ==
=== Infantry support guns ===
- Canon d'Infanterie de 37 modèle 1916 TRP

=== Field artillery ===
- 76 mm divisional gun M1902
- 76 mm divisional gun M1902/30
- 7.7 cm FK 16
- Type 38 10 cm cannon
- Skoda houfnice vz 14
- Canon de 105 mle 1913 Schneider
- QF 4.5-inch howitzer

=== Heavy artillery ===
- 122 mm howitzer M1910/30
- BL 60-pounder gun
- 152 mm gun M1910/30
- BL 6-inch 26 cwt howitzer
- Canon de 155 L Modele 1917 Schneider
- 152 mm howitzer M1910

=== Mountain guns ===
- Canon de 65 M (montagne) modele 1906
- 76 mm mountain gun M1909

== Anti-tank guns ==
- 37 mm anti-tank gun M1930 (1-K)
- 45 mm anti-tank gun M1932 (19-K)

== Anti-aircraft guns ==
- 76 mm air defense gun M1931

== Armoured fighting vehicles ==
- List of tanks in the Spanish Civil War

== See also ==
- List of Spanish Civil War weapons of the Nationalists
