= Rivista Italiana Difesa =

Italian military magazine

Rivista Italiana Difesa (RID; English: Italian Defence Magazine) is an Italian military magazine published by Coop Giornalistica La Riviera, from Chiavari (Liguria). Founded in 1982, the magazine is published monthly, each issue consisting of roughly 100 pages. Occasionally, a monographic insert is added to the main issue. The field of interests are about military and geostrategical analysis. Many articles were published with over 10 pages length, among them many aircraft designs analysis. The magazine's former director was Giovanni Lazzari; the present director is Pietro Batacchi. RID claims to be from the start the best Italian magazine in this field of interest. The covers were originally with full photos, but from 1990 RID has a white cover with one smaller photo and a resume of the items in every number printed.

From 2015, RID collaborates with tour operator Club Viaggi 3.14 to organize guided trips to important airshows open to the public such as Farnborough in UK and MAKS in Russia.
