= Spanish Army =

Land branch of the Spanish Armed Forces

- Ejército de Tierra
- Emblem of the Spanish Army
- Founded: 15th century
- Country: Spain
- Type: Army
- Role: Land force
- Size: 91,775 personnel (2025)
- Part of: Spanish Armed Forces
- Garrison/HQ: Buenavista Palace, Madrid
- Mascot: Crowned rampant eagle with Saint James cross
- Engagements: Italian Wars; European Wars of Religion; War of the Portuguese Succession; Anglo-Spanish War; Franco-Spanish War; Portuguese Restoration War; Nine Years' War; War of the Spanish Succession; War of the Quadruple Alliance; War of the Polish Succession; War of the Austrian Succession; Seven Years' War; American Revolutionary War; War of the Pyrenees; War of the Oranges; Peninsular War; Spanish American Wars of Independence; Carlist Wars; Hispano-Moroccan War; Dominican Restoration War; Ten Years' War; Cuban War of Independence; Philippine Revolution; Spanish–American War; Rif War; Spanish Civil War; Ifni War

Commanders
- Commander in Chief: King Felipe VI
- Chief of Staff of the Army: Army General Amador Fernando Enseñat y Berea

Insignia
- Flag patch

Aircraft flown
- Attack helicopter: Tiger
- Reconnaissance: Airbus EC-665 Tiger
- Trainer: Colibrí; EC135
- Transport: Chinook; Cougar; NH90

The Spanish Army (Spanish: Ejército de Tierra, lit. 'Army of Land') is the terrestrial army of the Spanish Armed Forces responsible for land-based military operations. It is one of the oldest active armies, dating back to the late 15th century.

The Spanish Army has existed continuously since the reign of King Ferdinand and Queen Isabella in the late 15th century. The oldest and largest of the three services, its mission was the defence of Peninsular Spain, the Balearic Islands, the Canary Islands, Melilla, Ceuta and the Spanish islands and rocks off the northern coast of Africa.

== History ==
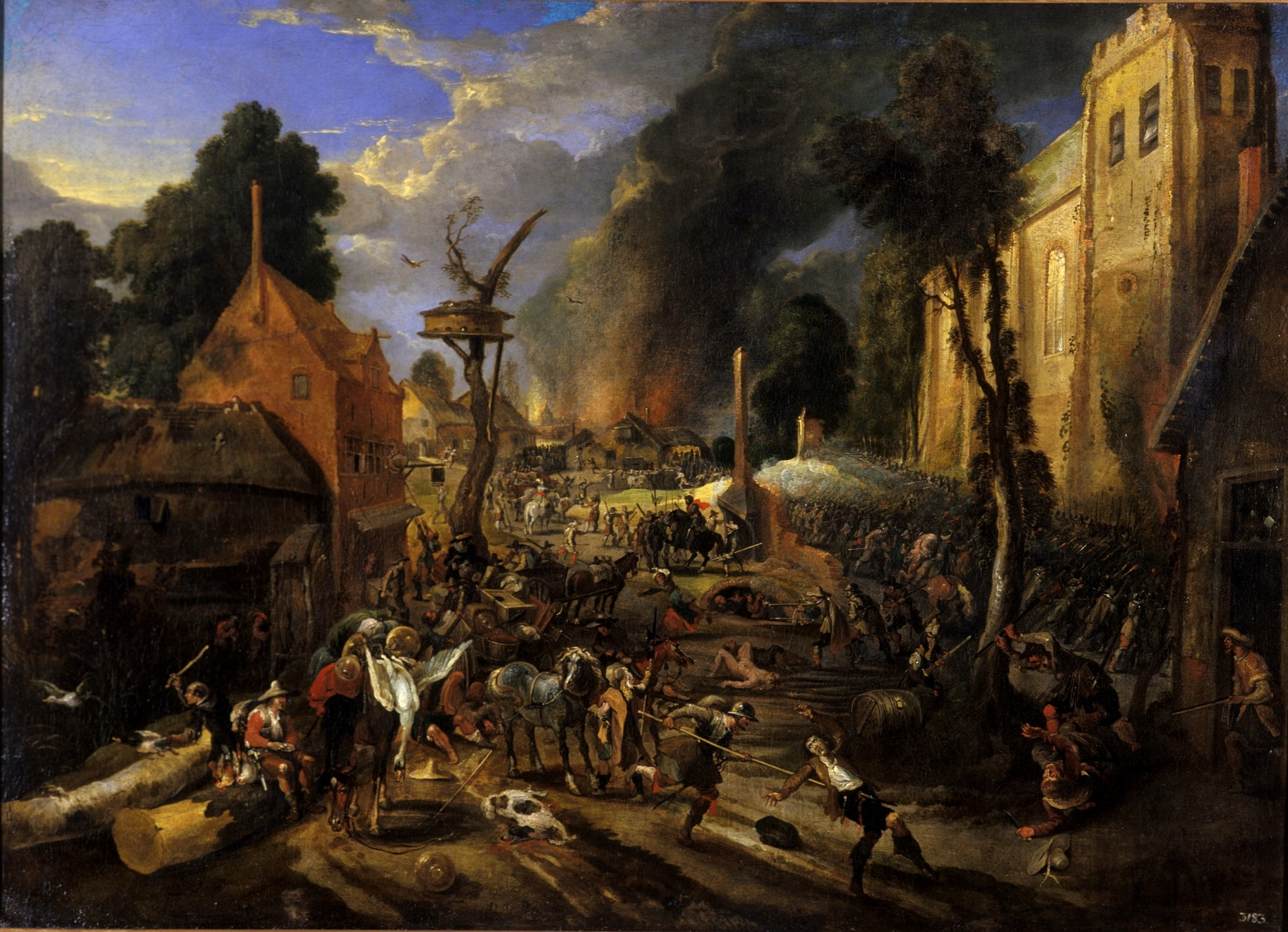
Spanish attack on a Flemish village

During the 16th century, Habsburg Spain saw steady growth in its military power. The Italian Wars (1494–1559) resulted in an ultimate Spanish victory, establishing its dominance over key Italian territories such as the Duchy of Milan and the Kingdom of Naples. During the war, the Spanish Army transformed its organization and tactics, evolving from a primarily pike and halberd wielding force into the first pike and shot formation of arquebusiers and pikemen. During the 16th century, this formation evolved into the tercio infantry formation.

Backed by the financial resources drawn from the Americas, Spain fought wars against its enemies, such as the long-running Dutch Revolt (1568–1609), defending Christian Europe from Ottoman raids and invasions, supporting the Catholic cause in the French civil wars and fighting England during the Anglo-Spanish War (1585–1604). The Spanish Army grew in size from around 20,000 troops in the 1470s to around 300,000 troops by the 1630s during the Thirty Years' War that tore Europe apart, requiring the recruitment of soldiers from across Europe. With such numbers involved, Spain had trouble funding the war effort on so many fronts. The non-payment of troops led to many mutinies and events such as the Sack of Antwerp (1576), in which 17,000 people died.

The Thirty Years' War (1618–1648) drew in Spain alongside most other European states. Spain entered the conflict with a strong position, but the ongoing fighting gradually eroded her advantages; first Dutch, then Swedish innovations had made the tercio more vulnerable, having less flexibility and firepower than its more modern equivalents. Nevertheless, Spanish armies continued to win major battles and sieges throughout this period across large swathes of Europe. French entry into the war in 1635 put additional pressure on Spain, with the French victory at the Battle of Rocroi in 1643 being a major boost for the French. By the signing of the Peace of Westphalia in 1648, Spain was forced to accept the independence of the Dutch Republic.

=== 18th century ===
Spain remained an important naval and military power, depending on critical sea lanes stretching from Spain through the Caribbean and South America, and westwards towards Manila and the Far East.

The Army was reorganized on the French model and in 1704 the old Tercios were transformed into Regiments. The first modern military school (the Artillery School) was created in Segovia in 1764. Finally, in 1768 King Charles III sanctioned the "Royal Ordinances for the Regime, Discipline, Subordination, and Service in His Armies", which were in force until 1978.

=== Napoleonic era and Restoration ===
In the late 18th century, Bourbon-ruled Spain had an alliance with Bourbon-ruled France and therefore did not have to fear a land war. Its only serious enemy was Britain, which had a powerful Royal Navy; Spain, therefore, concentrated its resources on its Navy. When the French Revolution overthrew the Bourbons, a land war with France became a danger which the king tried to avoid.

In Spanish Army the officer corps was selected primarily on the basis of royal patronage, rather than merit. About a third of the junior officers had been promoted from the ranks, and they did have talent, but they had few opportunities for promotion or leadership. The rank-and-file were poorly trained peasants. Elite units included foreign regiments of Irishmen, Italians, Swiss, and Walloons, in addition to elite artillery and engineering units. In combat, small units fought well, but their old-fashioned tactics were hard to use against the French Grande Armée, despite repeated desperate efforts at last-minute reform.

In 1808, Napoleon tried to depose Carlos IV of Spain and install his brother Joseph Bonaparte on the Spanish throne, sparking the Peninsular War. Initially, there was little resistance and Spain was occupied. Soon, however, Spanish units began to reorganize and set up guerrilla warfare, culminating in a Spanish victory at the Battle of Bailén within the first two months of the war. The defeated French evacuated the peninsula all the way to the Ebro valley near the Pyrenees, suffering many humiliating defeats against the regular Spanish Army. They were among the first sound defeats of the hitherto seemingly unbeatable Imperial French Army, forcing Napoleon to intervene personally with massive forces, but also sparked the War of the Fifth Coalition, as other European powers, led by Austria, were encouraged to declare war on France. The situation steadily worsened for the French although Napoleon brought more effective troops into the peninsula, as the guerrilla insurgents increasingly took control of Spain's battle against Napoleon and created a more or less unified underground national resistance, for which traditional armies of the time were not organized or prepared for yet. By 1812, however, the army controlled only scattered enclaves, and could only harass the French with occasional raids. Fortunately for the Spanish, the disastrous French invasion of Russia severely weakened the French Army and forced Napoleon to cut troop concentrations in Spain, ultimately allowing the Army, militia and their British allies to drive the French out of Spain by 1814.

=== During the 19th century ===
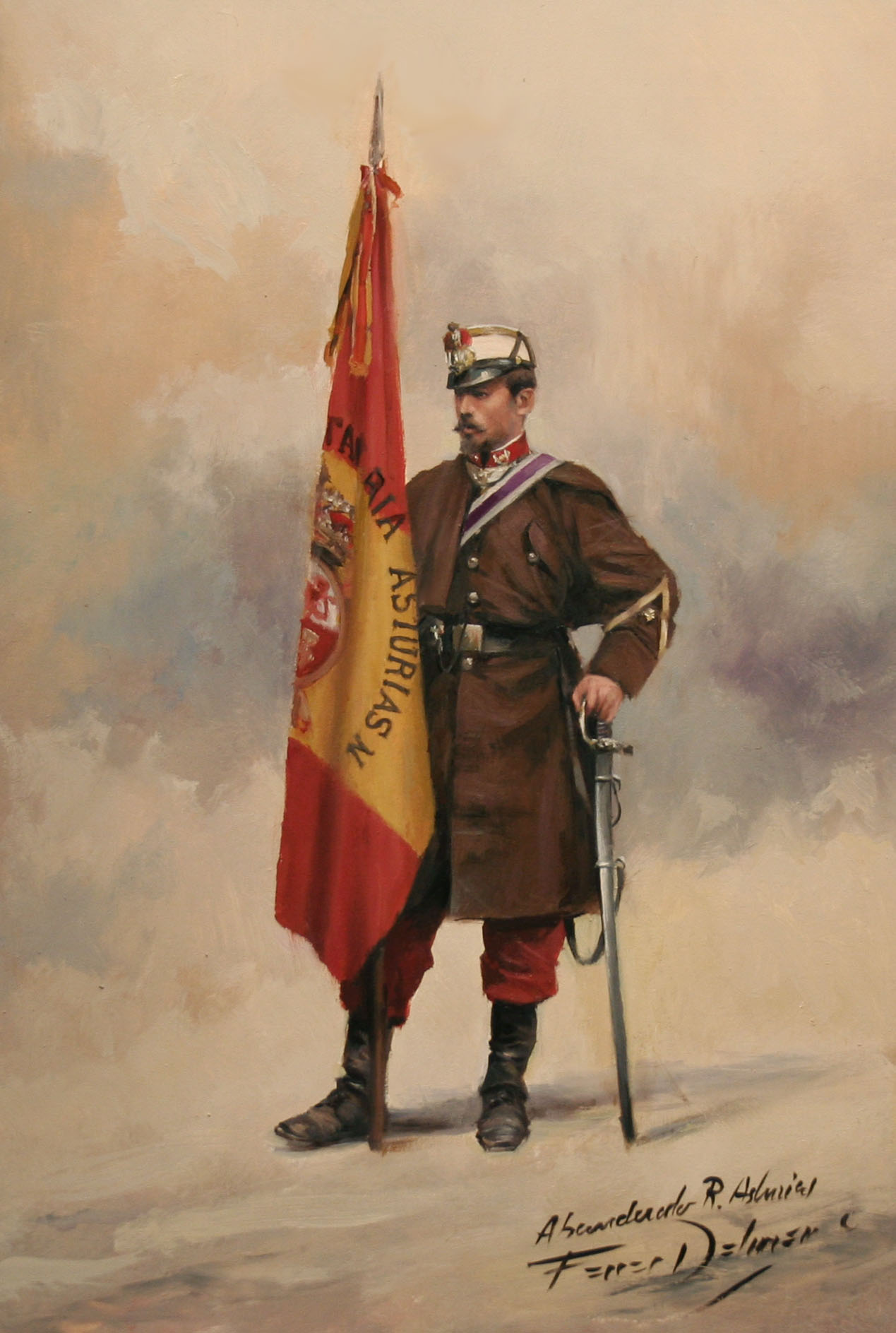
A soldier of the 31st Infantry Regiment of the Spanish Army during the Hispano-Moroccan War, by Augusto Ferrer-Dalmau

The Spanish Army emerged from the Napoleonic Wars devastated as a result of years of destructive conflict during the Peninsular War. A series of conflicts in Spain's American colonies with the aim of political independence from the Spanish Empire, which had broken out in 1808, led to the loss of a majority of these colonial possessions by 1833. During these conflicts, numerous armies from Spain were dispatched to Spanish America in order to defeat the Latin American revolutionaries; these efforts proved mostly unsuccessful. Combined with disturbances in Spain against the Spanish government, Spain's military strength suffered further during the post-Napoleonic era of the early 19th century. Recognizing the need to reform the Spanish Army, reforms were passed by the government of Spain during this period to reform and modernize the armed forces into a professional standing army; as part of these reforms, conscription was adopted by the Spanish Army. This grew the size of the Army to 250,000 in 1828, and it increased in 1830 to 300,000 soldiers. This therefore made the Spanish Army a relatively strong Army in Europe, though internal conflicts did affect the Army, forcing them to choose sides.

Spain faced a series of internal dynastic conflicts, collectively known as the Carlist Wars (1833–1876), during the 19th century; these conflicts led the Spanish state to undergo a series of reforms directed at its military, administrative, and social structures. As consequence of the Carlist Wars, and the weakness of the central structures of government under the Spanish monarchy, many generals with political ambitions staged coup d'états, known as pronunciamientos, which continued to occur until Bourbon Restoration in Spain under King Alfonso XII. These military interventions against the civil government eventually shaped a permissive cultural and political mentality, with a tacit expectation in Spain of "special emergency interventions" from the military that would pervade well into the first third of the 20th century.

=== First World War ===
Mauser Model 1893.

Throughout 1914-18 the Spanish Army continued to be maintained on a peacetime basis without the extended mobilisation measures of other neutral nations (Netherlands, Denmark, Switzerland and Sweden) in closer proximity to areas of actual fighting. Except in Morocco, Spanish troops continued to wear colourful dress uniforms for parade and off-duty wear; a feature that quickly disappeared in all armies directly involved in the war.

The main rifle of the Spanish Army at this time was a version of the Mauser, manufactured in Oviedo in 7 mm caliber, known as the Mauser Model 1893 rifle. To this was added a small number of machine guns such as the Maxim gun, Hotchkiss M1909 and even the M1895 Colt. However, the number of machine guns per company or division was much lower than in the rest of the European countries. The artillery was made up of cannons made by Krupp or various versions of the Schneider cannon made in Trubia and Seville. Most were being used in the Rif War being fought in northern Morocco (Rif), where Spain had been granted a protectorate.

The Spanish Navy was barely a shadow of its former self, though it was starting to rebuild. Its best units were the dreadnought España and the pre-dreadnought Pelayo and, under construction, the dreadnoughts Alfonso XIII and Jaime I. The navy had the armored cruisers Carlos V, Princesa de Asturias, and Cataluña, the protected cruisers Río de la Plata (es:Río de la Plata), Extremadura (es:Extremadura), and Reina Regente, the unprotected cruiser Infanta Isabel and, under construction, the light cruiser Victoria Eugenia. In addition there were seven destroyers: four of the Furor-class and, under construction, three new destroyers of the Bustamante-class, which were joined by the four Recalde-class and Álvaro de Bazán-class gunboats, in addition to other, older gunboats such as Mac-Mahón and Temerario.

Finally, the massive construction of T-1 class torpedo boats began, of which six had already been commissioned, together with the older torpedo boats Orión, Habana, and Halcón torpedo boats. Finally, the navy also included the typical conglomerate of tugboats, cutters, gunboats, and small boats.

In short, the Spanish Navy of 1914 was composed largely of older ships that were not sunk near Cuba and the Philippines during the Spanish–American War, either because they survived the naval battles or because they were part of Admiral Manuel de la Cámara's fleet, which had not been involved in the conflict. Other ships had been built recently under the Ferrándiz Plan.

The Military Aeronautics (predecessor of the Spanish Air Force) had just been created in 1913, so it had few units. All the planes were bombers, since the fighters did not appear until well into the war. Of biplanes it had Farman MF.7, Farman MF.11, Lohner B.I; and monoplanes with several Morane-Saulnier G and Nieuport II, which together formed the Military Aeronautics, to which a few more biplanes and the first seaplanes of the Naval Aeronautics would later be added.

Spanish neutrality left the country outside the technological advances derived from war needs, so that, at the end of the war in November 1918, the Spanish Military Aviation was in a situation of clear inferiority in means compared to those of the other neighbouring countries.

Some pictures of Spanish Armed Forces of that time

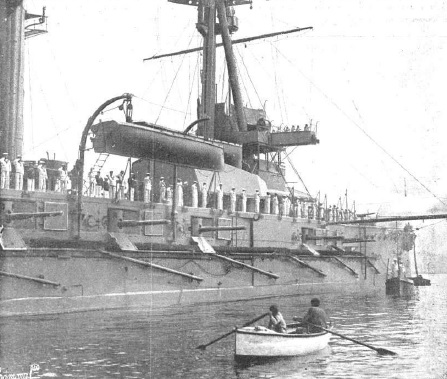
Battleship España, of the España-class battleship, in the port of Bilbao on the occasion of a Royal visit in 1915.

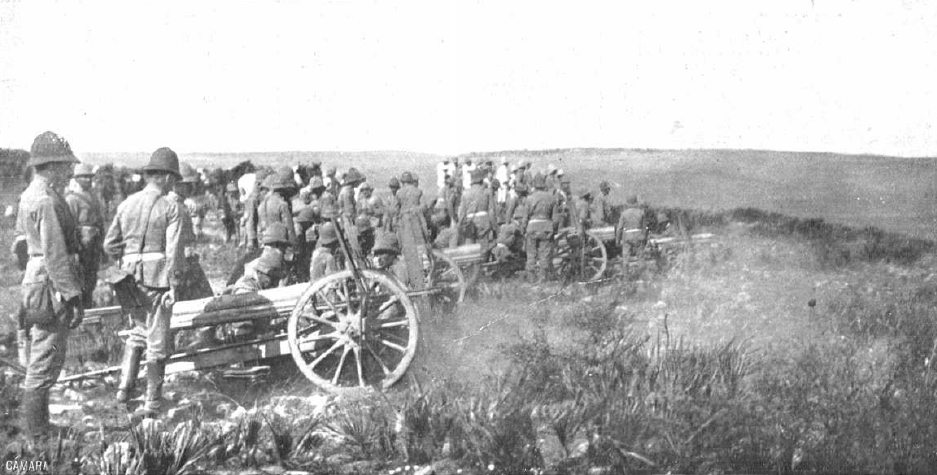
Spanish artillery in action in September 1913 in the Gaba forest during the Rif War.

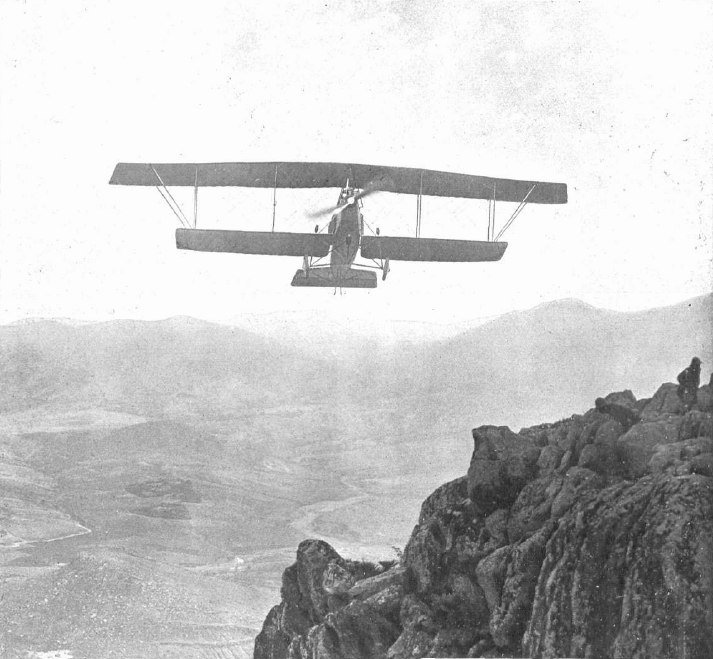
A Lohner B.I airplane of the Spanish Army returning to its base in the Tetuan area in 1913.

== The Spanish Army under Franco (1939–1975) ==
This period can be divided in four phases:

- 1939–1945: Second World War
- 1945–1954: International Isolation (lack of means)
- 1954–1961: Agreement with the United States (a certain improvement in means and capabilities)
- 1961–1975: Development plans (economic basis for the modernisations that follows in the 1970s and 1980s).

=== Second World War ===
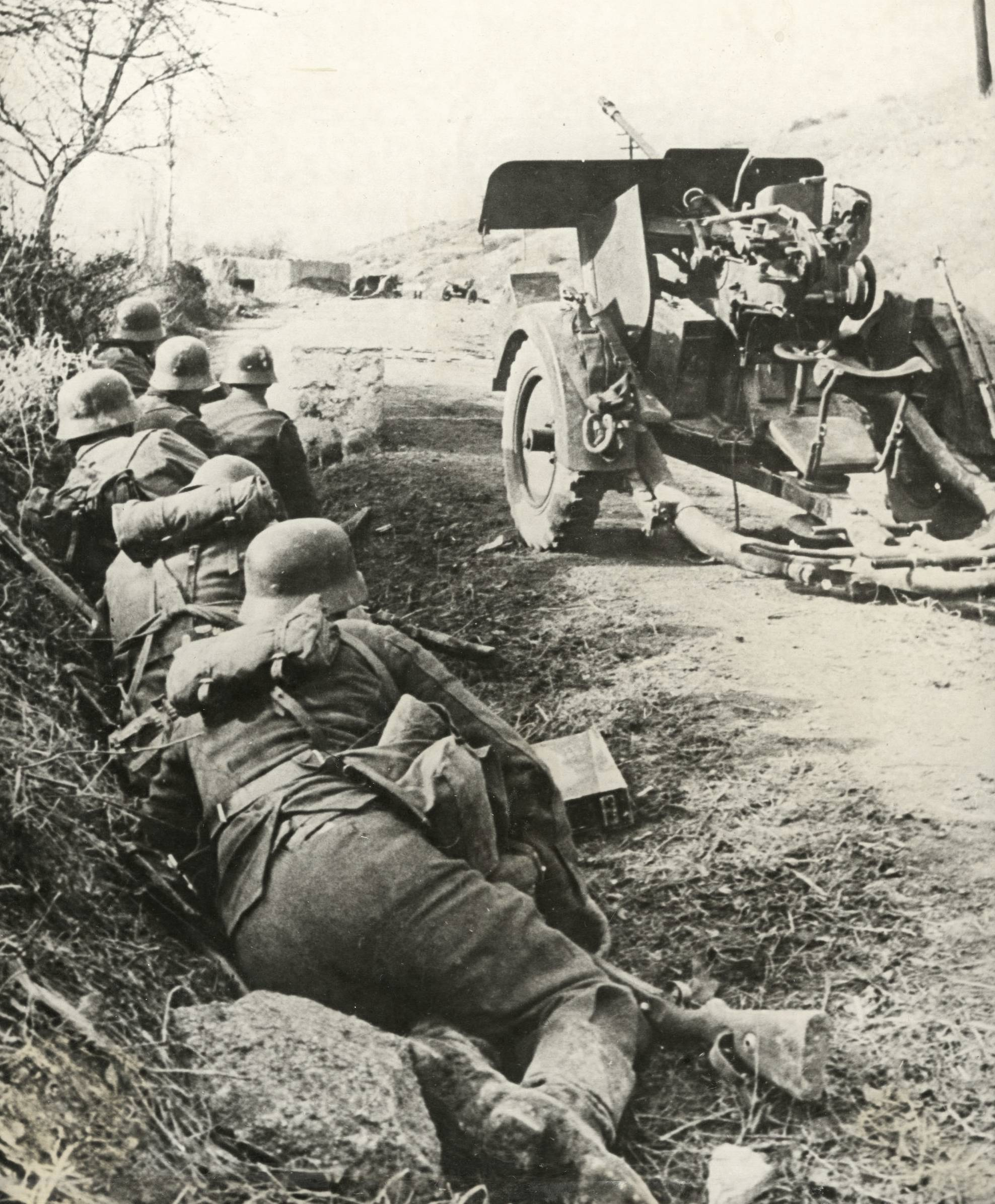
Spanish soldiers of the Blue Division during World War II, c. 1941

At the end of the Civil War, the Francoist (Nationalist) Army counted 1,020,500 men, in 60 divisions. During the first year of peace, Francisco Franco dramatically reduced the size of the Spanish Army to 250,000 in early 1940, with most soldiers being two-year conscripts. In October 1940, the Army had sixteen line infantry divisions; three mountain divisions; one cavalry division; and five divisions in Spanish Morocco (IX Army Corps and X Army Corps), for a total of twenty-five. Other units included, in addition to those of the army corps in each captaincy: four tank regiments; field artillery, coastal and anti-aircraft regiments; regiments of different engineering specialties; the garrisons of the Canary Islands, the Balearic Islands, Ceuta and Melilla, Ifni-Sahara, and the naval bases; and more than one hundred workers' battalions.

A few weeks after the end of the war, the eight traditional Military Regions (Madrid, Sevilla, Valencia, Barcelona, Zaragoza, Burgos, Valladolid, and the VIII Military Region at La Coruña) were reestablished. In 1944 the IX Military Region, with its headquarters in Granada, was created. The Air Force became an independent service, under its own Ministry of the Air.

Concerns about the international situation, Spain's possible entry into the Second World War, and threats of invasion led Franco to undo some of these reductions. In November 1942, with the Allied landings in North Africa and the German occupation of Vichy France bringing hostilities closer than ever to Spain's border, Franco ordered a partial mobilization, bringing the army to over 750,000 men. The Air Force and Navy also grew in numbers and in budgets, to 35,000 airmen and 25,000 sailors by 1945, although for fiscal reasons Franco had to restrain attempts by both services to undertake dramatic expansions.

During the Second World War, the Army in metropolitan Spain had eight Army Corps, with two or three Infantry Divisions each. Additionally, the Army of Africa had two Army Corps in Northern Africa, and there were the Canary Islands General Command and the Balearic Islands General Command, one Cavalry Division, plus the Artillery's General Reserve. In 1940 a Reserve Group, with three Divisions, was created.

=== The Blue Division ===
Although Spanish caudillo Francisco Franco was neutral and did not bring Spain into World War II on the side of Nazi Germany, he permitted volunteers to join the German Army (Wehrmacht) on the condition they would only fight against the Soviet Union on the Eastern Front, and not against the Western Allies or any Western European occupied populations. In this manner, he could keep Spain at peace with the Western Allies, while repaying German support during the Spanish Civil War and providing an outlet for the strong anti-Communist sentiments of many Spanish nationalists. Officially designated as División Española de Voluntarios by the Spanish Army and as 250 Infanterie-Division in the German Army, the Blue Division was the only component of the German Army to be awarded a medal of their own, commissioned by Hitler in January 1944 after the division had demonstrated its effectiveness in impeding the advance of the Red Army on the Volkhov front (October 1941 – August 1942) and in the Siege of Leningrad (August 1942 – October 1943), mainly at the Battle of Krasny Bor.

=== International isolation ===
At the end of the Second World War, the Spanish Army counted 22,000 officers, 3,000 NCO and almost 300,000 soldiers. The equipment dated from the Civil War, with some systems produced in Germany during the World War. Their doctrines and training were obsolete, as they had not incorporated the teachings of the Second World War; Scianna elaborates on the weaknesses of equipment, political role, and worldview. This situation lasted until the agreements with the United States in September 1953.

=== Agreement with the United States (Barroso Reform, 1957) ===
After the signing of the military agreement with the United States in 1953, the assistance received from Washington allowed Spain to procure more modern equipment and to improve the country's defence capabilities. A U.S. Military Assistance Advisory Group was established in Spain, and more than 200 Spanish officers and NCOs received specialised training in the United States each year. With the Barroso Reform (1957), the Spanish Army abandoned the organisation inherited from the Civil War to adopt the United States' pentomic structure. General Instruction 158/107 of 1958 led to the raising of three experimental infantry divisions (DIE 11 at Madrid, DIE "Guzman el Bueno" 21 at Algeciras, and DIE 31 at Valencia). Instruction 160/115 of January 15, 1960 extended these changes to another five transformation divisions (DIT, at Gerona, Málaga, Oviedo, Vigo, Vitoria, respectively) and the four mountain divisions (divisións de infantería de montaña, DIM). Most of the heavy divisions had five manoeuvre agrupaciones based on two to three regiments and support formations, while the Mountain Divisions "Urgel" 42, 51, 52, and "Navarra" 62 had six batallón de cazadores de montaña anchored on two to three regiments, an independent company, and what appears to be a battalion of motorised infantry.

Theoretically, these divisions were divided between three corps that would have reached across the boundaries of the Captaincies General if they had been formed:

- I Army Corps (Madrid): DIE 11, DIE 61, DIT 71, DIT 81
- II Army Corps (Seville): DIE 21, DIE 31, DIT 41, DIT 91
- III Army Corps (Zaragoza): DIM 42, DIM 51, DIM 52, DIM 62

All in all, after the Barroso Reform, the Spanish Army had eight Pentomic infantry divisions, four mountain divisions, Armoured Division No. 1 "Brunete", the "Jarama" Cavalry Division, organized into a division HQ and four armoured groups ("agrupaciones blindadas"), three independent Armoured Brigades at rather reduced strength, and three Field Artillery Brigades ("Brigada de artillería de campaña") with assigned artillery groups.

=== Years of economic development (1965–1975) ===
The 1965 Reforms were inspired by then-contemporary French organisation and doctrine. Camilo Menéndez Tolosa's reforms from 1965 divided the Army into two categories: the Immediate Intervention Forces (FII, Field Army) and the Defensa Operativa del Territorio (DOT, Operational Territorial Defence (Territorial Army)) territorial forces.

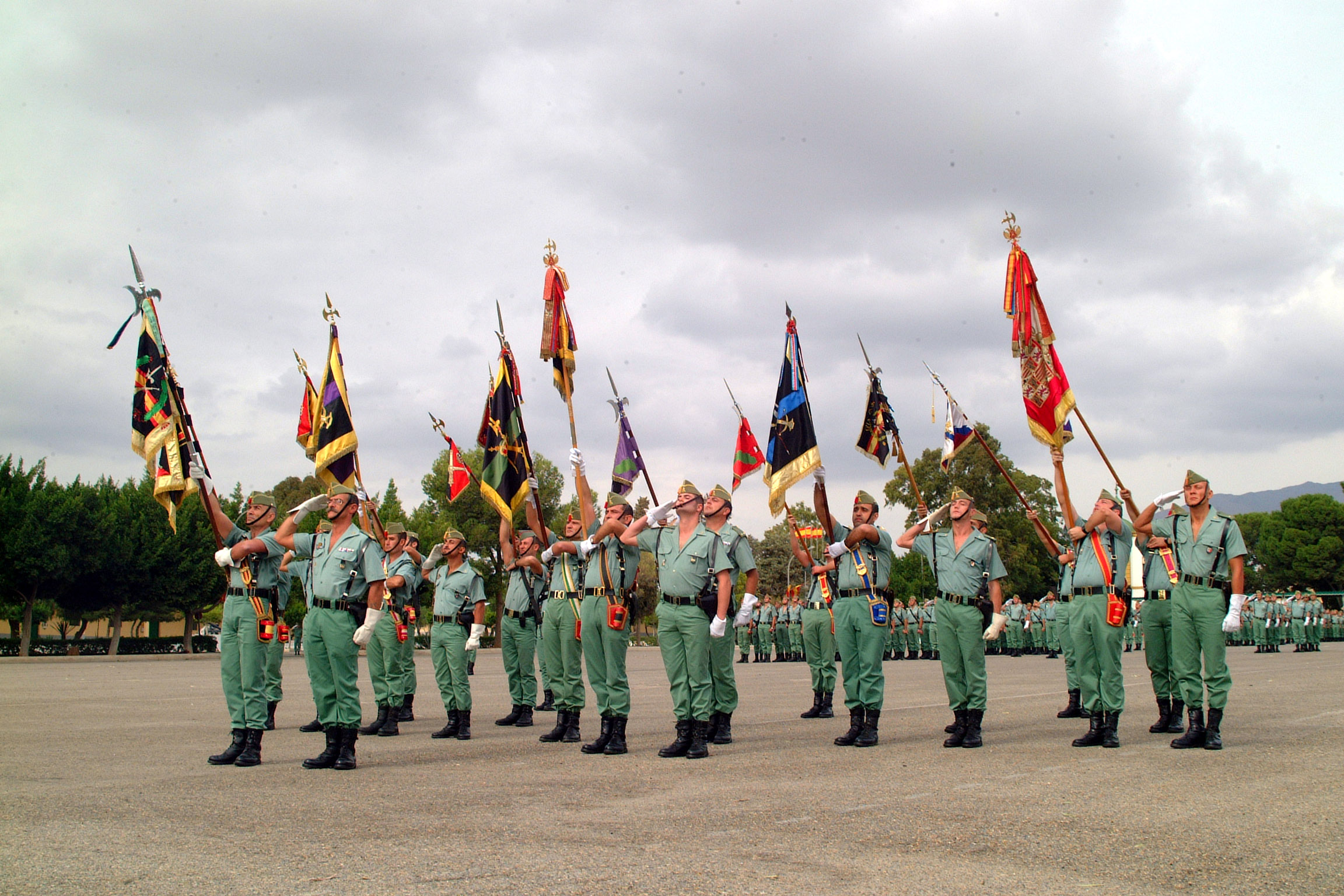
Troops of the Spanish Legion

The FII had the mission of defending the Pyrenean and the Gibraltar frontiers and of fulfilling Spain's security commitments abroad. It was to be "an army corps equipped and trained for conventional and limited nuclear warfare, ready to be deployed within or outside national borders." It was made up of:

- Armoured Division No. 1 "Brunete", with two armoured Brigades;
- Mechanised Infantry Division "Guzmán el Bueno" No. 2, with Mechanised Infantry Brigade XXI (BRIMZ XXI) at Cordoba, and Motorised Infantry Brigade XXII (BRIMT XXII) at Jerez;
- Motorised Division "Maestrazgo" No. 3 with its headquarters in Valencia and two brigades;
- Parachute Brigade (raised 1973)
- Air-Transportable Brigade
- Armoured Cavalry Brigade
- Army Corps support units

The DOT was to maintain security in the regional commands and of reinforce the Civil Guard and the police against subversion and terrorism. It comprised nine independent Infantry Brigades (one in every one of the Military Regions of Spain), organized with a brigade HQ and two infantry battalions each; the Mountain Infantry Division No. 4 "Urgell" and Mountain Infantry Division No. 6 "Navarra"; the Mountain Reserve of the Army High Command; the Canary Islands, Balearic Islands, Ceuta and Melilla commands, with their respective DOT units including the Regulares (six groups later reduced to four) and the Spanish Legion (4 Tercios); and the Army General Reserve Command, composed of DOT units working as the reserve force of the Army, the equivalent to the United States Army Reserve.

During the last years of the Francoist regime, contemporary weapons and vehicles were ordered for the Army. In 1973, the military education system was reformed in depth, in order to make its structure and objectives similar to those existing in the civilian universities. It was during this time that the Spanish Army fought in the campaigns in what is now Western Sahara against Arab forces in the area who agitated for the end of Spanish colonial rule.

== The Spanish Army under King Juan Carlos I and beyond ==
=== Initial years (1975–1989) ===
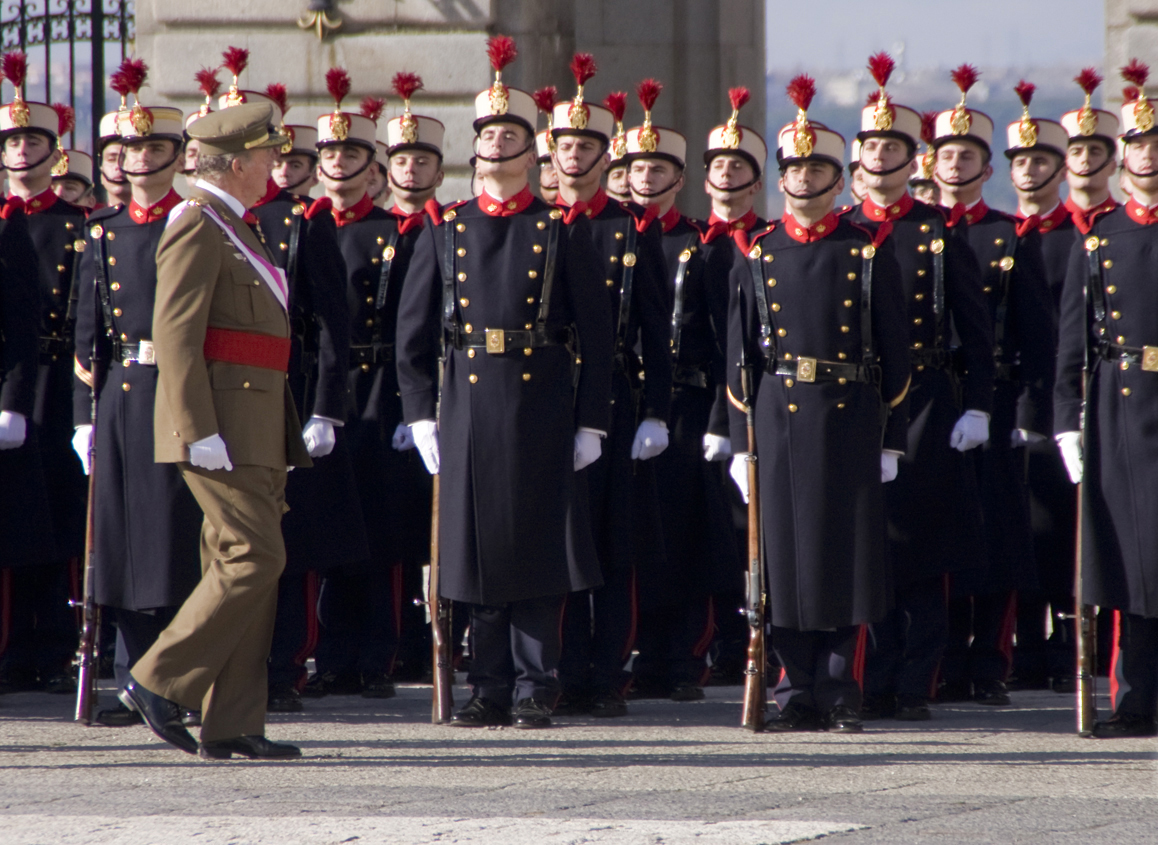
Juan Carlos I reviewing the Spanish Royal Guard in 2009.

Three main events characterise this period: creation of a single Ministry of Defence (1977) to replace the three existing military ministries (Army, Navy and Air Ministries), the failed coup d'état in February 1981 and the accession to NATO in 1982.

The Modernización del Ejército de Tierra plan was carried out from 1982 to 1988 so that Spain could achieve full compliance with NATO standards. Military regions in mainland Spain were reduced from nine to six; the Intervention Force and the Territorial Defence were merged; the number of brigades was reduced from 24 to 15; and personnel numbers cut from 279,000 to 230,000.

=== After the end of the Cold War (1989–present) ===
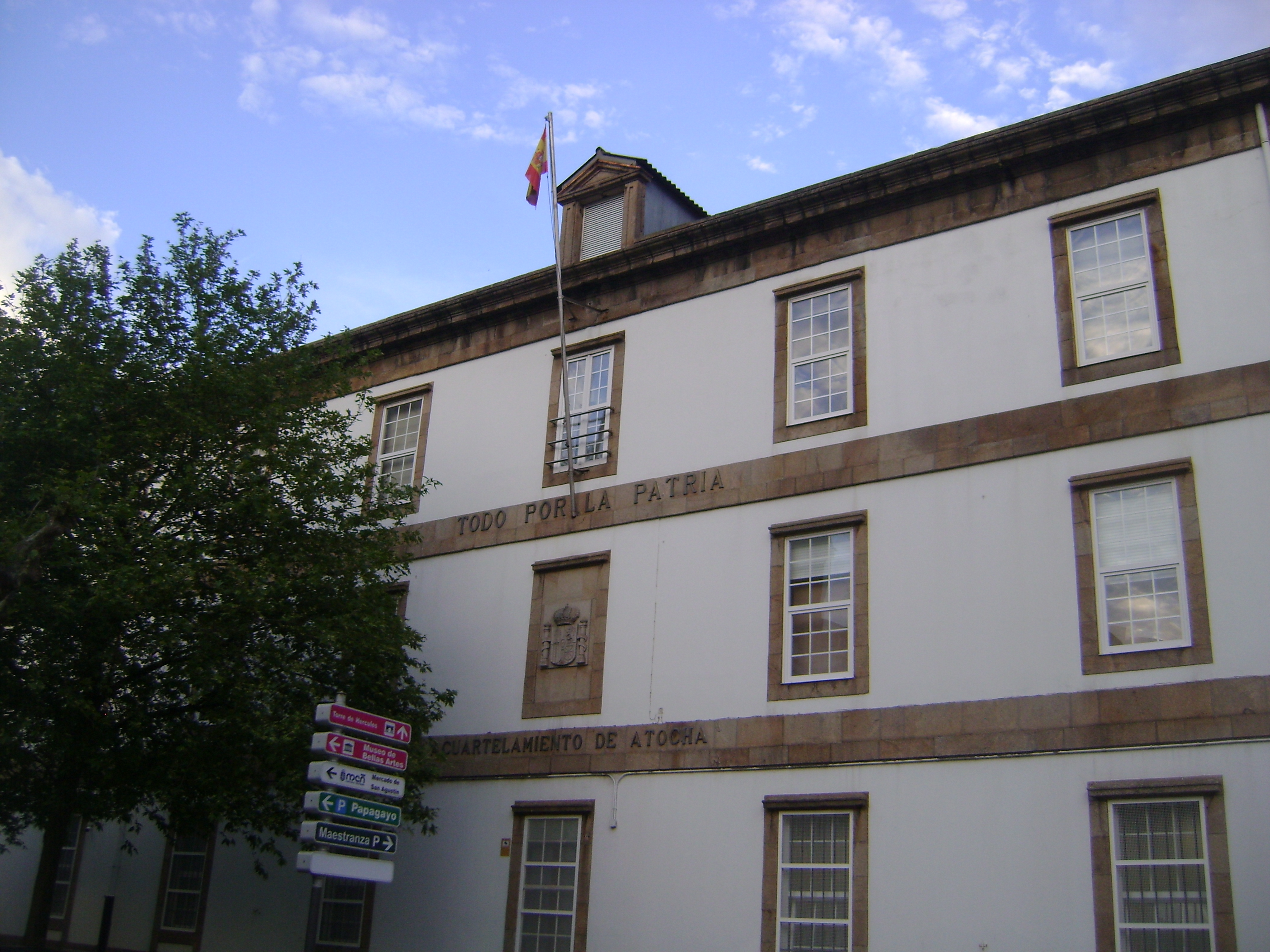
Barracks in La Coruña.

The end of the Cold War meant the disappearance of the Eastern Bloc threat. The reduction of the term of military service for conscripts until its complete abolition in 2001 and the increasing participation of Spanish forces in multinational peacekeeping operations abroad were the main drivers for changes in the army after 1989.

Three reorganisation plans have been implemented since. The first was the RETO plan (1990). In 1994, Plan NORTE was published, which was implemented between 1995 and 1999. NORTE eliminated four of the five existing divisions, leaving the Army composed of the Permanent Force and the Mobilizable Reserve. The Permanent Force included a mechanized division of three brigades, a cavalry brigade, a parachute brigade, a light airborne brigade, a Legion brigade, a mountain hunter brigade, the garrison forces of the Canary Islands, the Balearic Islands, Ceuta and Melilla, and other support elements. The now "Manoeuvre Force", located in the old Captaincy of Valencia, was reduced to an army corps equivalent of a complete heavy division and the equivalent of a light division with reduced support. The Mobilizable Reserve included three mobilizable infantry brigades, a mobilizable cavalry brigade and other support units. The captaincies general finally disappeared, being replaced by regional commands. The third plan was the Instruction for Organisation and Operation of the Army (IOFET) 2005.

== Equipment and personnel ==
=== Personnel ===
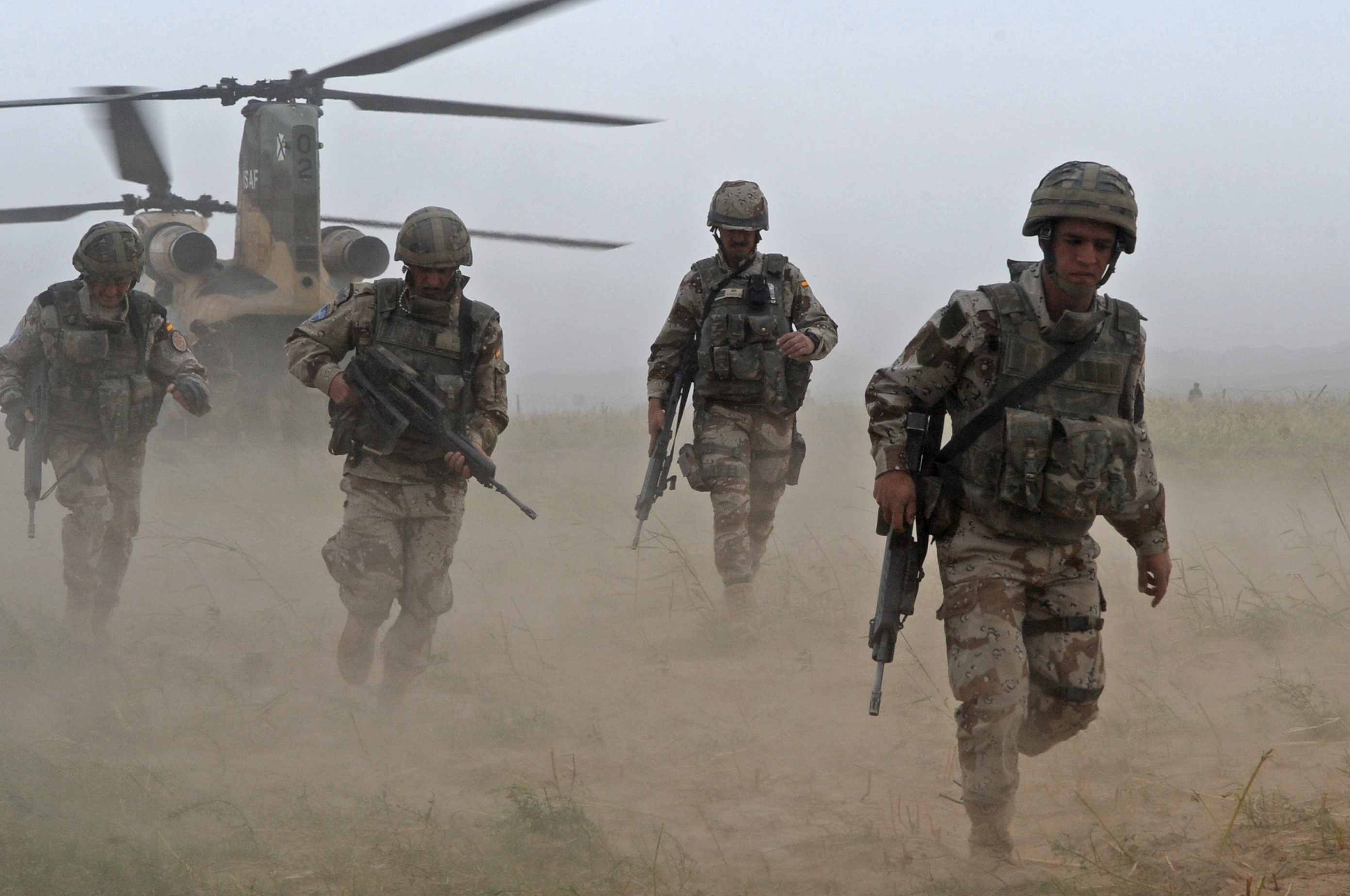
Spanish soldiers of the Airborne Brigade in Afghanistan during Operation Enduring Freedom (2001–2014).

In 2001, when compulsory military service was still in effect, the army was about 135,000 troops (50,000 officers and 86,000 soldiers). Following the suspension of conscription the Spanish Army became a fully professionalised volunteer force and by 2022 had a personnel strength of 74,700 active military personnel and 8,478 men in reserve. In case of a war or national emergency, an additional force of 80,000 Civil Guards comes under the Ministry of Defense's command.

== Uniforms ==
Digital woodland	Digital desert

== Ranks and insignia ==
=== Commissioned officer ranks ===
The rank insignia of commissioned officers.

NATO code	OF-10	OF-9	OF-8	OF-7	OF-6	OF-5	OF-4	OF-3	OF-2	OF-1
Spanish Army
Spanish Army	Capitán general	General de ejército	Teniente general	General de división	General de brigada	Coronel	Teniente coronel	Comandante	Capitán	Teniente	Alférez

=== Other ranks ===
The rank insignia of non-commissioned officers and enlisted personnel.

NATO code	OR-9		OR-8	OR-7		OR-6	OR-5	OR-4	OR-3	OR-2	OR-1
Spanish Army
Spanish Army	Suboficial mayor	Subteniente	Brigada	Sargento primero	Sargento	Cabo mayor	Cabo primero	Cabo	Soldado (larga duración)	Soldado (inicial)

== See also ==
- Army of Spain (Peninsular War)
- FAMET
- Spanish Legion
- Spanish Republican Army
- Coats of Arms, Badges and Emblems of the Spanish Army
- List of military weapons of Spain

== Bibliography ==
- Instruction no. 59/2005, of 4 April 2005, from the chief of the army staff on army organisation and function regulations, published in B.O.D. NO. 80 of 26 April 2005
- Lehardy, Diego, Spanish Army in a difficult phase of its transformation, RID magazine, July 1991.
- Mogaburo López, Fernando (2017). Historia Orgánica De Las Grandes Unidades (1475–2018) (PDF). Madrid: Ministerio de Defensa – Mando de Adiestramiento y Doctrina.
- Scianna, Bastian Matteo (2019). "Stuck in the past? British views on the Spanish army's effectiveness and military culture, 1946–1983". War and Society. 38 (1): 41–56. doi:10.1080/07292473.2019.1524347. S2CID 159007579. Antiquated material and limited budgets were not the only reasons for the army's low potential wartime capability after World War II. "..Spain continued to field around twenty divisions, whereas the defence industry and available national resources could only sustain six operational divisions. A regular Spanish infantry division could muster full strength with modern infantry weapons, while other ‘teeth’ units – like the artillery and engineers – were reduced to one-third of their ideal levels. The supporting ‘tail’ was so underdeveloped that divisions were statically bound to their home depot and could only defend their military district after six months mobilisation.." [The paper] draws on British and German sources to demonstrate how Spanish military culture prevented an augmented effectiveness and organisational change.
