= 3008 =

3008 may refer to:

== Astronomy ==
- 3008 Nojiri, a minor planet
- NGC 3008, a lenticular galaxy

== Vehicles ==
- German submarine U-3008, a Type XXI U-boat of Nazi Germany's Kriegsmarine that then served in the United States Navy after World War II
- HMAS LST 3008, a World War II landing ship tank that served in the Royal Navy and Royal Australian Navy
- Peugeot 3008, a 2008–present French compact SUV
  - Peugeot 3008 DKR, a 2017 French rally raid car

== Arts, entertainment, and media ==
- 3008 Docklands Magazine, an Australian magazine
- 3008 (Roblox experience), Roblox experience based on SCP-3008

== Other uses ==
- Louisiana State Highway 3008, a highway in Webster Parish, Louisiana, United States
- MP 3008, a World War II German substitute standard submachine gun
- SCP-3008, a fictional infinite IKEA retail space
