= Galactic Center filament =

Large structures found in the center of the Milky Way

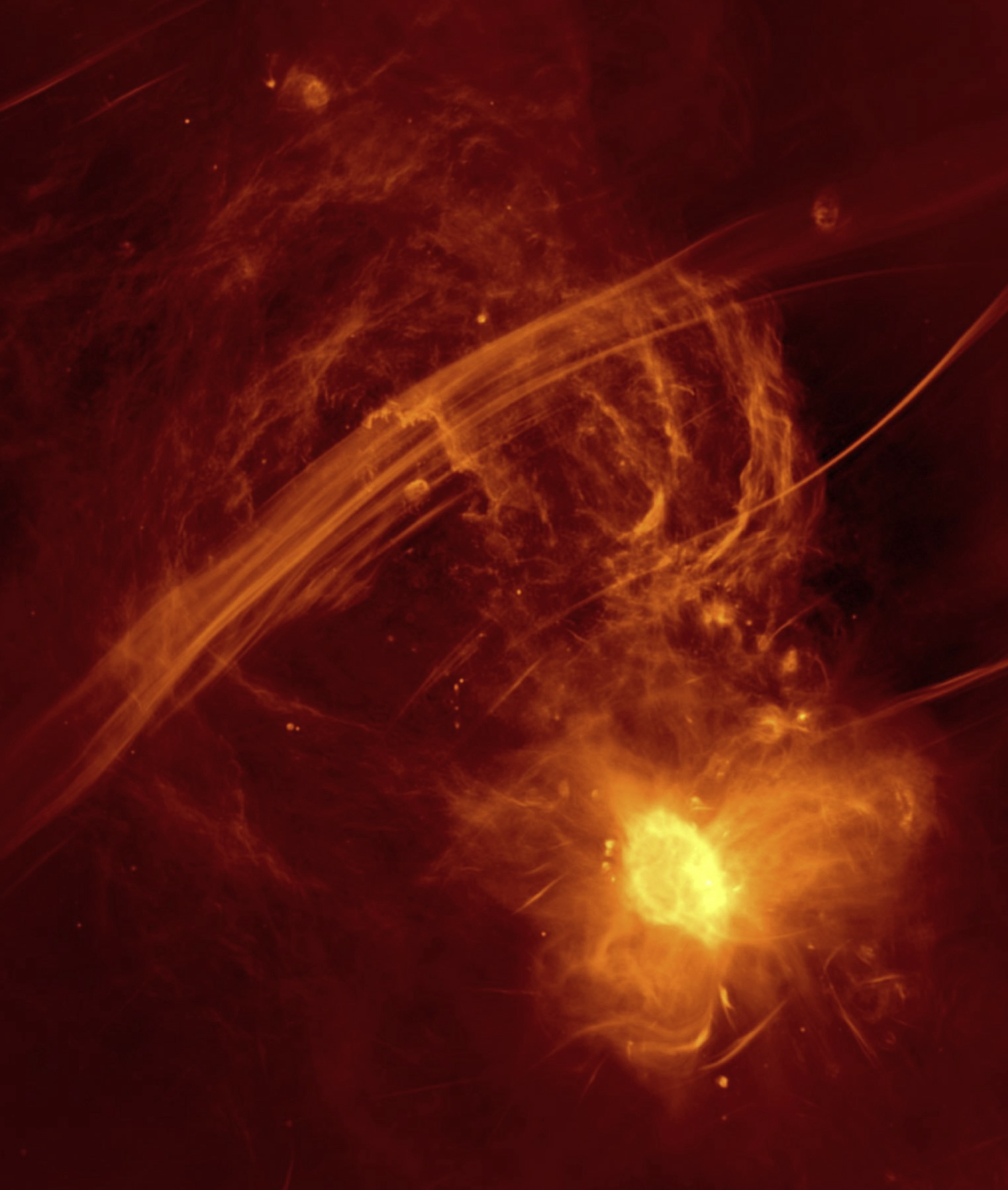
Radio image of a number of parallel filaments in the Galactic Center; Sagittarius A*, the Milky Way's central black hole, is located in the bright region in the bottom right

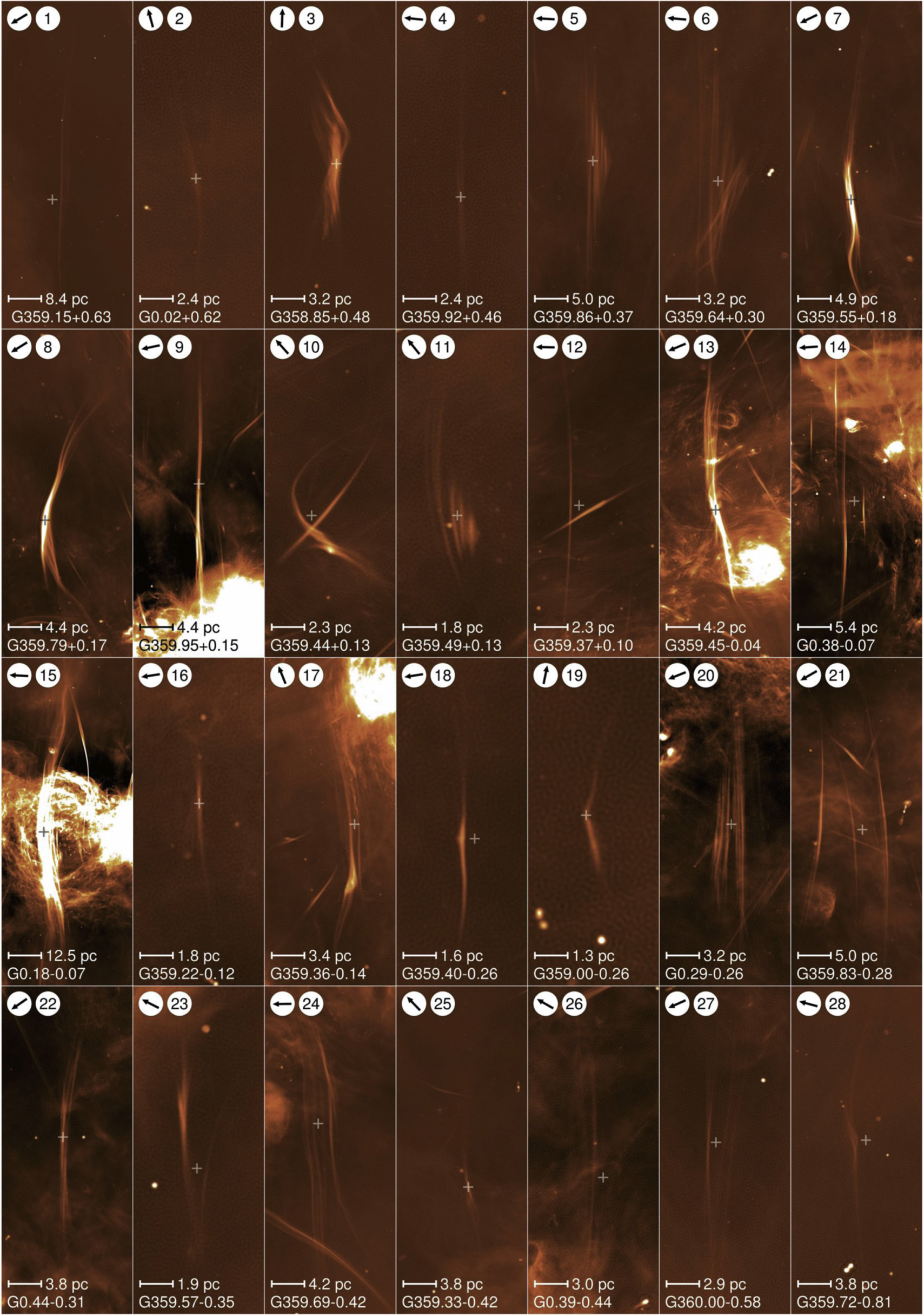
Nonthermal radio filaments from the 4"-resolution MeerKAT mosaic; oriented vertically for space; scales given assuming a distance of 8.2 kpc

Galactic Center filaments are large, radio-emitting, filament-shaped structures found in the Galactic Center of the Milky Way. Their cause is unknown. Both vertical and horizontal filaments exist, running perpendicular and parallel to the galactic plane, respectively, away from the Galactic Center. Vertical filaments possess strong magnetic fields and emit synchrotron radiation: radiation emitted by particles moved at near-lightspeed through a magnetic field. Although theories have been proposed, the source of these particles is unknown. Horizontal filaments appear to emit thermal radiation, accelerating thermal material in a molecular cloud. They have been proposed to be caused by the outflow from Sagitarius A*, the Milky Way's central black hole, impacting vertical filaments and H II regions of ionized gas around hot stars.

While the vertical filaments can reach 150 light-years in length, the horizontal filaments are much shorter, usually around 5 to 10 light-years long. A few hundred horizontal filaments are known to exist (as of 2023), far fewer than the number of vertical filaments. Vertical filaments were discovered in 1984 by Farhad Yusef-Zadeh, Mark Morris, and Don Chance; horizontal filaments were discovered in 2023 by Yusef-Zadeh, Ian Heywood, and collaborators.

Vertical filaments are often found in pairs and clusters, often stacked equally spaced side-by-side similar to the strings of a harp. As of 2022, it was unknown why they formed in clusters or in a regularly spaced manner.

Analyses of galaxy rotation curves have also suggested the existence of vertical gravitating filaments of unclear origin at the center of numerous other galaxies, including (but not limited to) NGC 2841, NGC 2998, NGC 3726, NGC 5371, NGC 5585, NGC 5907, UGC 2885, and Messier 109.

== History ==
Galactic Center filaments, specifically vertical filaments, were first discovered in a 1984 publication by Yusef-Zadeh et al. They were discovered unexpectedly, and initially considered to be possible artifacts, but confirmed after being observed at multiple wavelengths by multiple groups.

Because the earliest filaments detected were all vertical filaments, oriented perpendicular to the galactic plane, early theories suggested that they may have been related to the Milky Way's magnetic field, oriented in the same manner. A number of theories had been proposed by 1996. One interesting proposal out of many at the time suggested the filaments were cosmic strings. This faced several difficulties, including the lack of observed oscillation of the strings, and the apparent splitting of some of the filaments.

Subsequently, before 2004, weaker filaments were discovered not perpendicular to the galactic plane. These were initially believed to be oriented randomly in respect to it, and at the time presented difficulties for hypotheses relating Galactic Center filaments to the galactic magnetic field. The radiation emitted from vertical filaments is now known to be synchrotron radiation, caused by particles moving at nearly the speed of light through a magnetic field.

A detailed radio image of the Galactic Center by the MeerKAT telescope published in February 2022 led to the discovery of about ten times more filaments than had been previously known, allowing researchers to study the filaments statistically. Horizontal filaments were discovered in a June 2023 publication by Yusef-Zadeh et al. According to Yusef-Zadeh, they were identified by statistical tests after he happened to notice, looking at images of the filaments, that many seemed to be pointing radially away from the Galactic Center.
