= Big Lick =

Big Lick may refer to:

- Big Lick, North Carolina, a populated place
- Big Lick, Virginia, a former name of Roanoke
- "Big lick" movement is an unnaturally exaggerated high-stepping action at any horse gait seen in certain show horse breeds, often linked to illegal soring
- The HD-2 channel of WCLT-FM, a radio station (100.3 FM) licensed to Newark, Ohio, United States
- A galaxy group consisting of NGC 5371 and Hickson 68
