= G359.1-0.2 =

One of the longest radio filaments

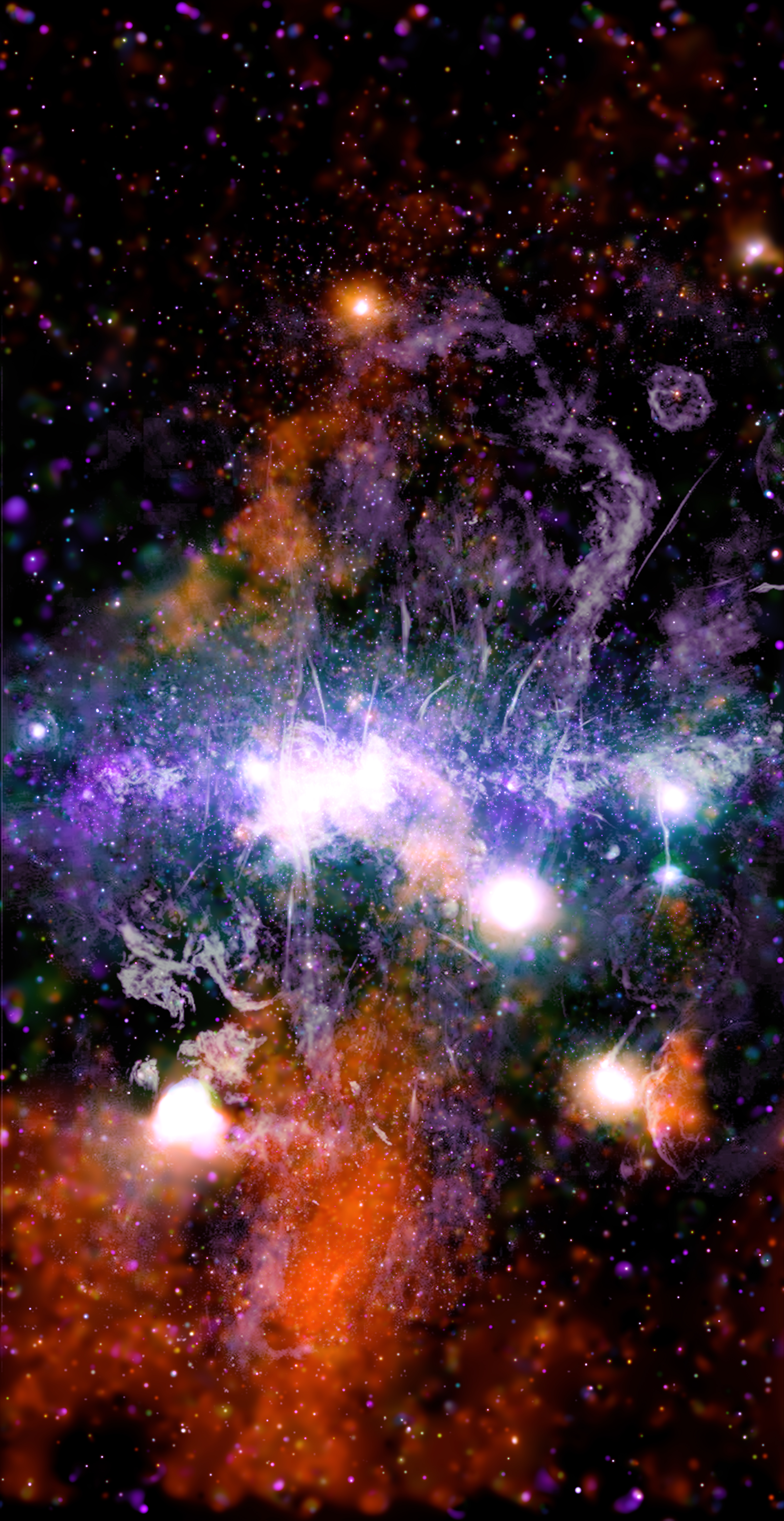
- Image of the Galactic Center of the Milky Way galaxy where G359.1-0.2 is located. Here can be seen there are many long threads which are similar in appearance to G359.1-0.2
- Object type: Astronomical radio source
- Other designations: G359.13142-0.20005, G359.13, The snake, Galactic Center snake

Observation data (Epoch J2000)
- Constellation: Sagittarius
- Right ascension: 14h 44m 19.244s
- Declination: -29° 46' 52.96"
- Distance: 8 kpc
- Notable features: One of the longest radio filaments

G359.1-0.2 (short for G359.13142-0.20005), or more commonly known as "The Bone" or the Galactic Center Snake (or, more simply, The Snake), is a radio filament located in the Galactic Center of the Milky Way galaxy. It is one of the brightest radio filaments discovered and is also one of the longest at ~70 parsecs (230 ly) in length; however, it is thin, being just 0.4 parsecs (1.3 ly) in width.

It may have formed from a star trail intersecting a shock from a supernova remnant (SN) which preferentially travelled up the trail accelerating electrons producing radiation.

== Morphology ==
The snake is one of the longest radio filaments discovered so far but it is very thin, being about 0.4 parsecs wide. Running along it are two kinks, a major northern kink and a southern minor kink. The major kink is likely produced by a pulsar moving between 1,600,000–3,200,000 km/h (1,000,000–2,000,000 mph) through the filament.

It is linearly polarized over much of the filaments extent. The intrinsic magnetic field is also well aligned.

== Environment ==
Located to the west of The Snake’s both major and minor kinks are two compact radio objects named G359.132-0.200 (a radio pulsar) and G359.120-0.265.
