= Erma ESP 85A =

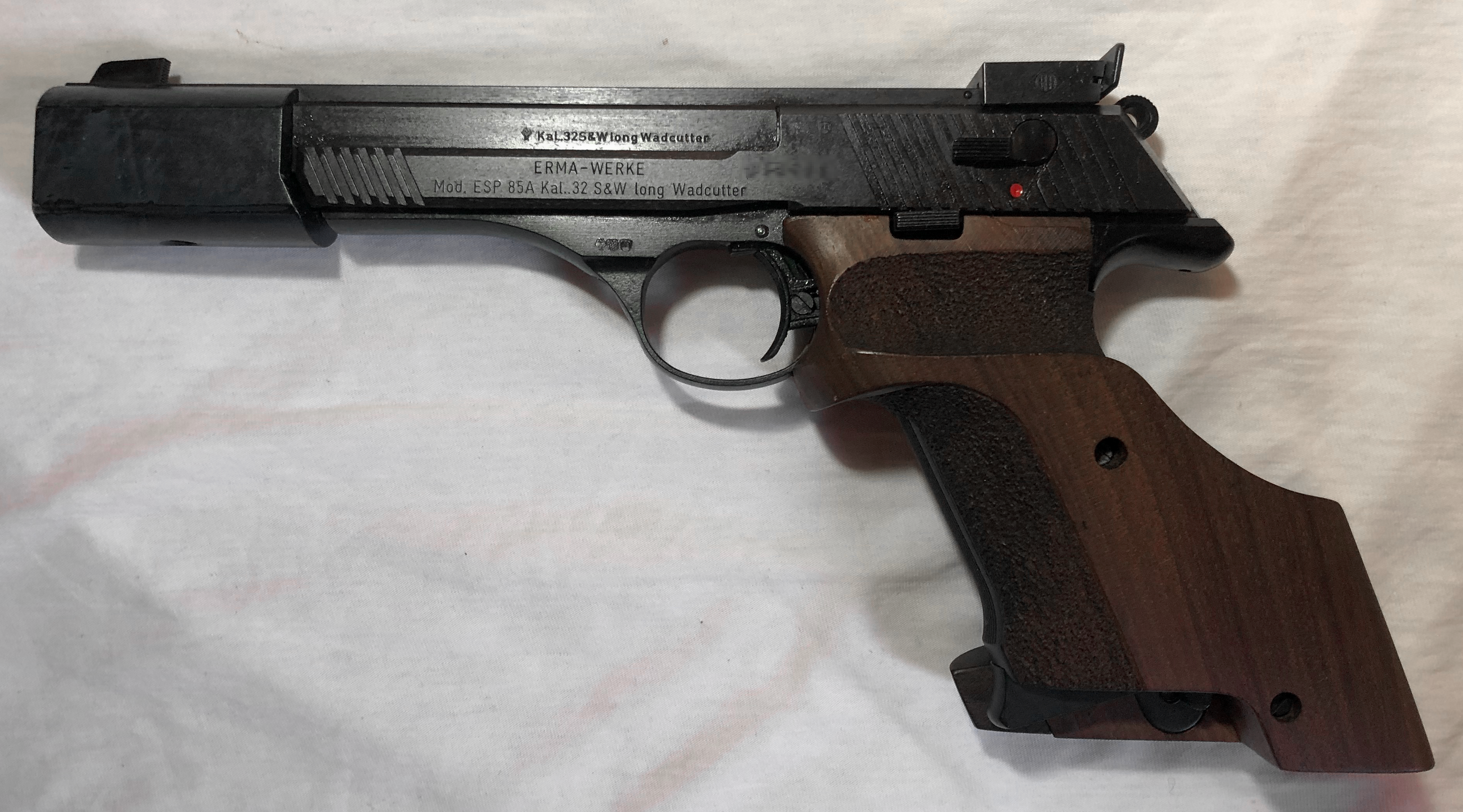
- Type: Semi-automatic pistol
- Place of origin: Germany

Production history
- Designer: Stuart N. Lake
- Manufacturer: Erma
- Produced: 1988–1994

Specifications
- Mass: 40 ounces (1,100 g)
- Length: 10 inches (25 cm)
- Barrel length: 6 inches (15 cm)
- Cartridge: .22 LR, .32 S&W Long
- Feed system: 8-round magazine (.22 LR); 5-round magazine (.32 S&W Long)
- Sights: Interchangeable blade front sight, micrometer fully adjustable read.

The ESP 85A is a target pistol produced by the German firearms company Erma.

Mainly used as a sporting arm, it is also found in service with security companies. It is available in two calibers, .22 LR (the preferred sporting or target model) and .32 S&W Long (7.65x23mm).

There is a difference between models marked ESP85 and ESP85A. Both versions could have been had with either the 100 mm (4-inch) or 153 mm (6-inch) barrel. There is even a shorter version, where the barrel flushes with the forward front of the slide. Some models, probably the ESP85, have a longer trigger bar than the ESP85A, and also with a different placed disconnector-notch in the slide. These part do not interchange.

The ESP85 also has a simpler, all-steel trigger, whereas the ESP85A has a forward-rearward adjustable plastic-steel trigger.

The feeding ramp between the ESP85 and ESP85A is also a bit different. While one may attach the barrel to the frame, the trigger will not work, because rearward movement will stop against the feeding-ramp. But a usable conversion can be made with the help of a gunsmith.

Although the precision is on par with any top-notch target pistols, the high bore axis will increase felt recoil, and doesn't lend itself to ISSF rapid-fire matches. Reliability-problems are usually not an issue with these guns.

Other drawbacks are the simple trigger mechanism. It has a similar design to the other pocket-sized pistols of Erma. The Erma needs frequently cleaning in the trigger area, especially with the .22 version, since primer/gunpowder residue and bullet wax will make the trigger somewhat gritty and uneven.

Since the Erma has a magazine-grip, it has its limitations when it comes to grip-modifications. Shooters with stubby fingers will have problems reaching the trigger with the appropriate 90-degree angle. The grip-angle is somewhat shallow and outdated compared to new high-class pistols, meaning that the shooter must use more muscles to get a good shot.

Its strength lies in the somewhat sloppy fitting between slide and frame, securing reliability even after 2000 rounds without cleaning.

The ESP 85 is 255 mm (10 in) long with a 153 mm (6.0 in) barrel, and features single-action operation. It weighs 1,140 g (40 oz) empty, and the magazine capacity is eight rounds.

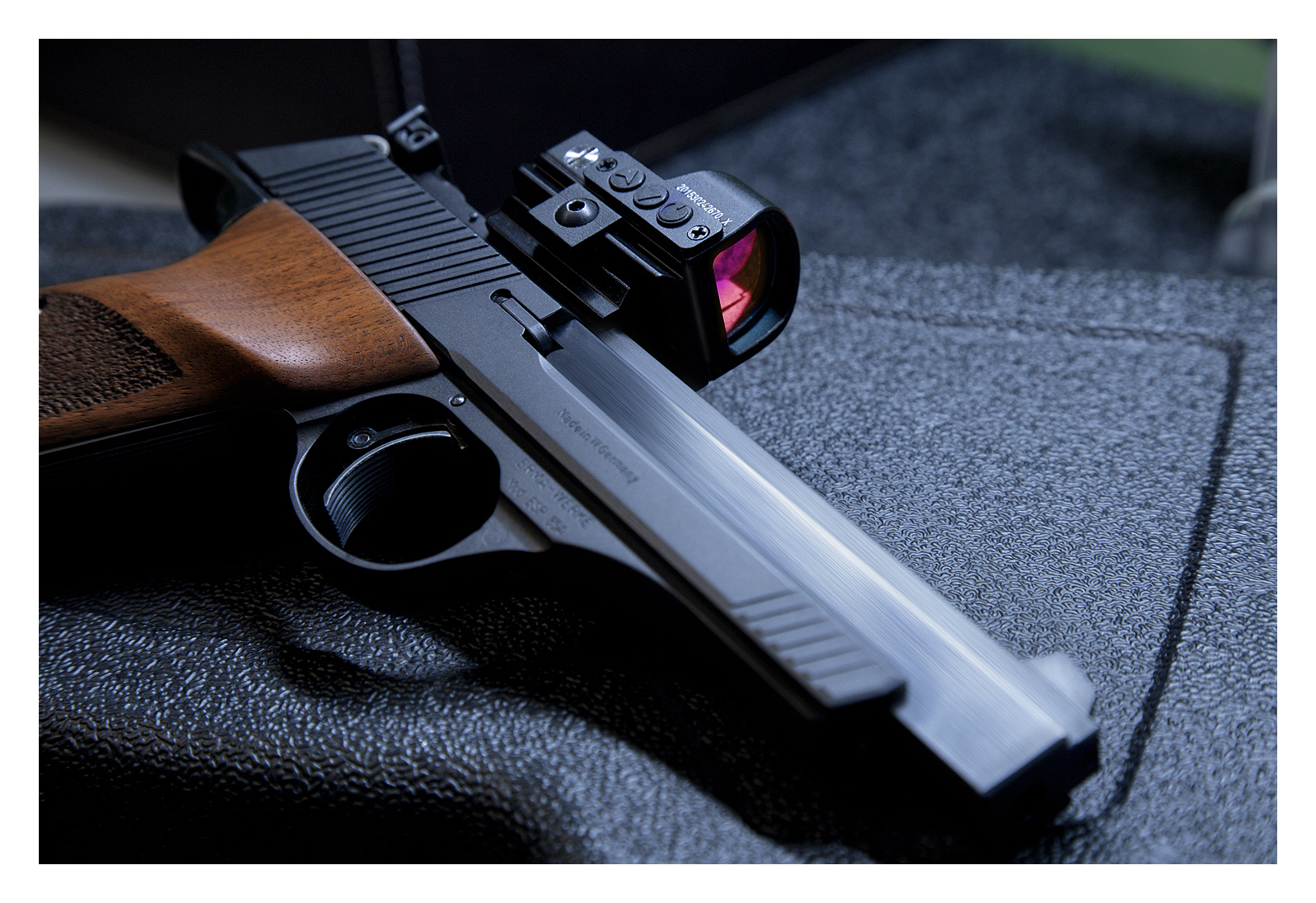
ERMA 85 ESP with custom red dot installed
