= Gallager carbine =

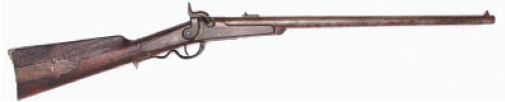
- Type: Black powder breechloading rifle
- Place of origin: United States

Service history
- In service: 1861
- Used by: United States Army; Confederate States Army; France
- Wars: American Civil War; Franco-Prussian War

Specifications
- Length: 30 in (762mm)

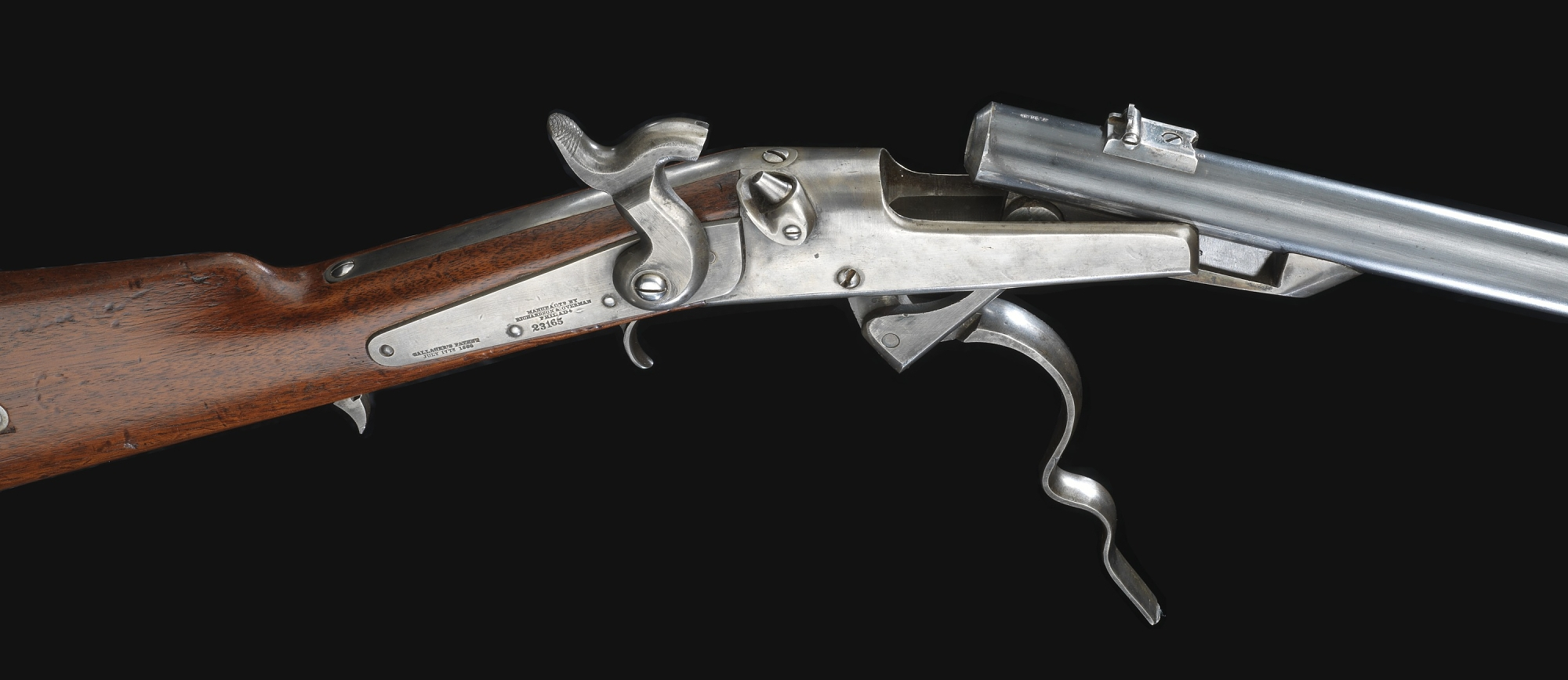
Action close-up

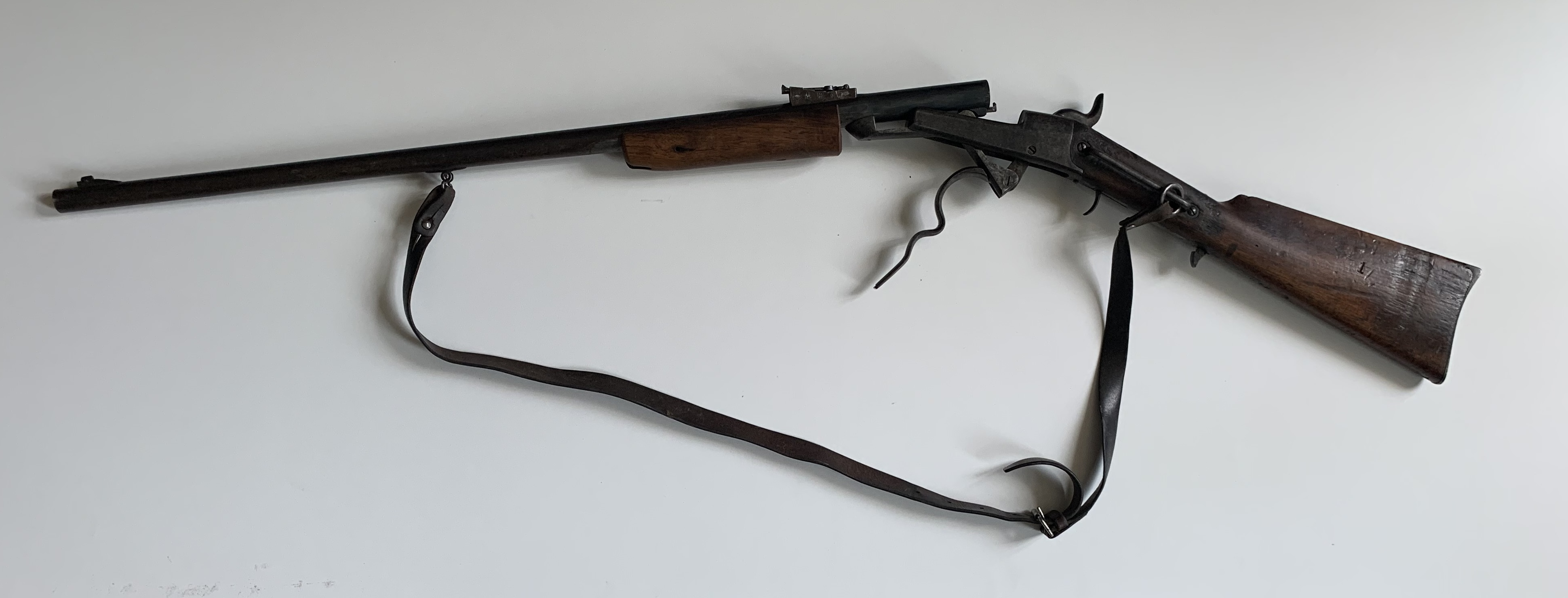
Left side - Gallager

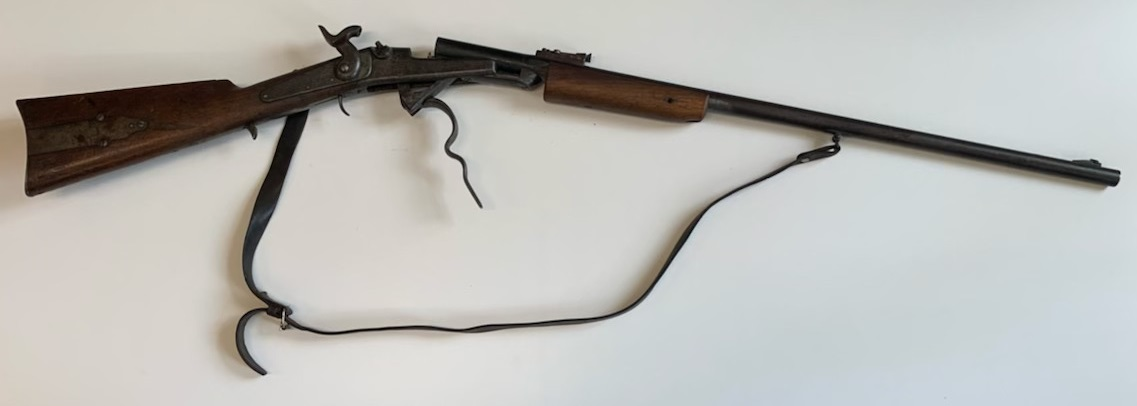

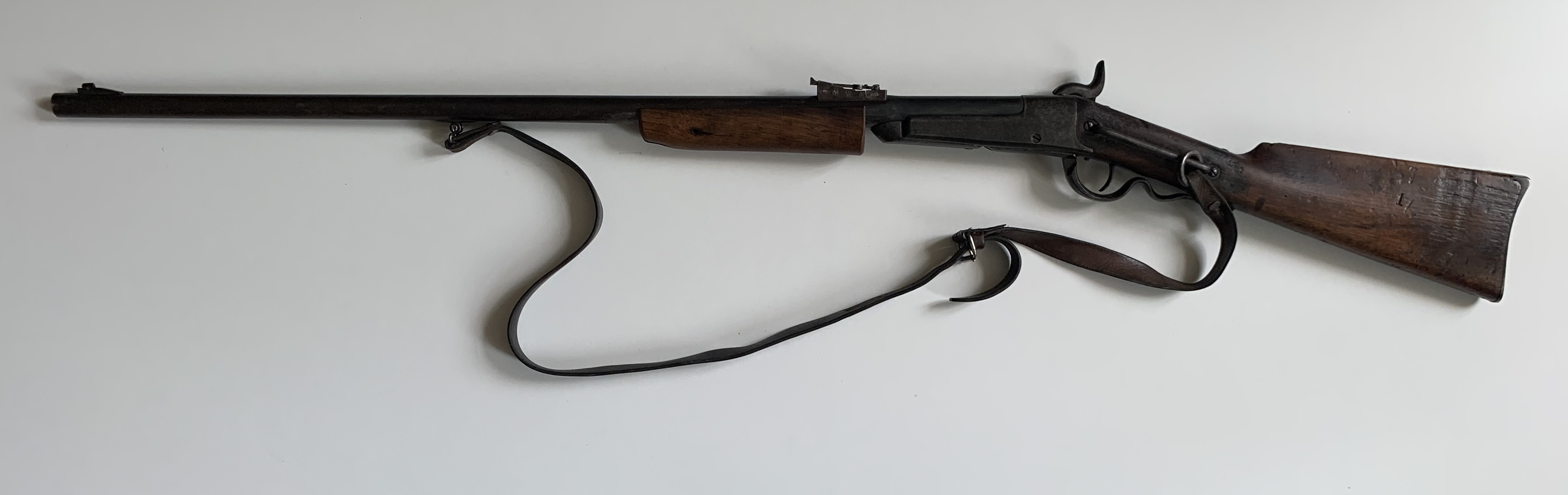
left side of the Gallager rifle

The Gallager carbine is an American black powder breechloading percussion rifle produced in the American Civil War.

== History ==
The weapon was designed by Mahlon J. Gallager, who licensed the design to Richardson and Overman of Philadelphia for production. On 31 August 1861 the first weapons were sold to the Army.

The Gallager was loaded from the rear with brass cases, which contained the projectile and the propellant. Covered by a disc made of greased felt, the projectile was inserted in the barrel after it was tilted up by a lever, followed by the case, and (like the concurrent muzzleloaders, such as the Springfield) were ignited by percussion cap, which was placed on the bolt face. The brass cases had a paper patch in the base, to prevent powder seepage and still allow the cap to fire the round. The weapon was 0.525 in (13.3 mm) caliber with a 22 in (56 cm) barrel.

The rifle was strongly made, but unpopular with troops. Frequently, the cases stuck due to expansion of the front part and had to be laboriously removed.

A total of 17,782 were sold to the U.S. Army.

The army procured approximately 22,728 Gallagher carbines. According to the government procurement records of Gallagher carbines, 17,728 Gallagher 1860 carbines were delivered to the army by the end of 1864.

Although the specific details remain ambiguous, Confederate issued Gallagher to the 6th Texas, 9th Tennessee, and 11th Virginia regiments.

In 1865, Mahlon L. Gallager modified this carbine. He adapted it to be fed with the .50/52 Spencer cartridge. This cartridge was a rimfire cartridge, and in place of the nipple on which the percussion cap was placed, he placed a massive firing pin, which, when struck by the cock, caused the gun to fire. The Spencer cartridge had a rim, which made it possible to equip the Gallager carbine with an extractor and eliminate the hassle of cartridges extraction. The modified carbine was presented to the Ordnance Department. After the presentation, the Ordnance Department ordered the modification of 5,000 Gallager carbines with a cap lock to the new version of the Spencer-cartridge version.

According to the Government Procurement of Gallager Carbines, 5,000 modified Gallager 1865 carbines were delivered to the army by the June 1865.

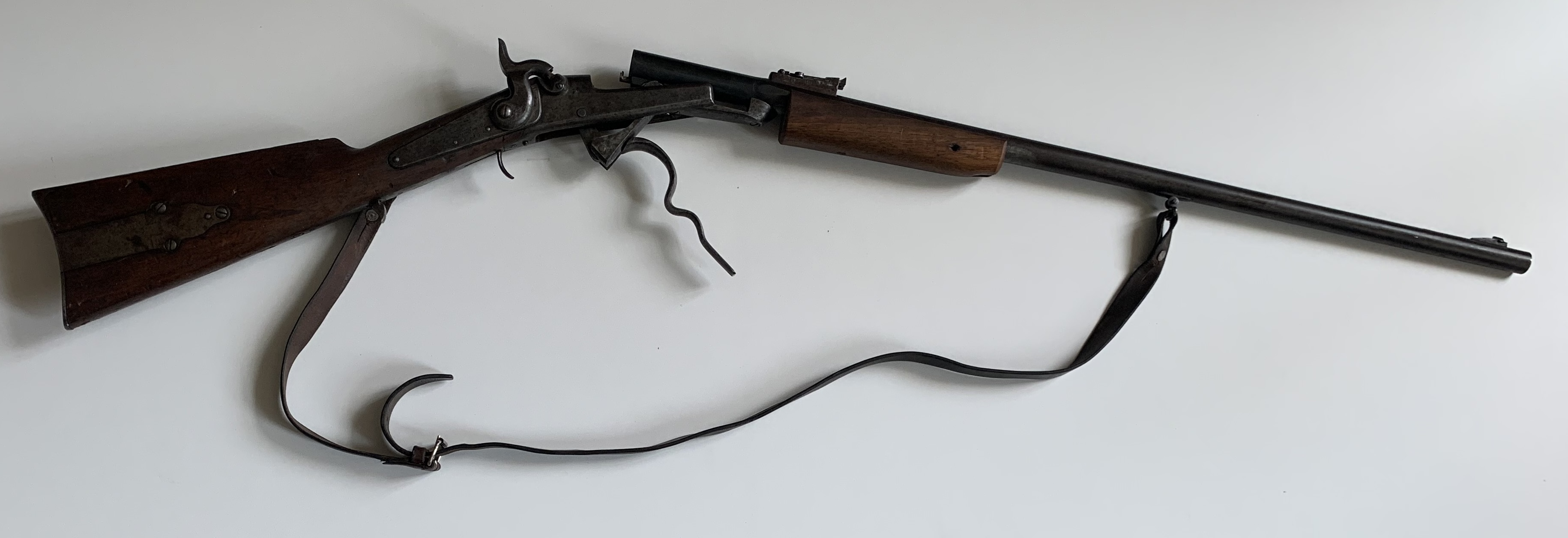
Right side - Gallager

After being withdrawn from the US Army's armament, Gallager carbines found their way into the civilian market.

Richardson & Overman still briefly produced modified Gallager carbines for the civilian market, but with the market saturated with military demobilized weapons, production was halted in the second half of the 1860s.

Many of the carbines were modified to thin-walled cartridges with a rim and cartridges extractor. This eliminated problems with gas blowback and cartridges extraction.

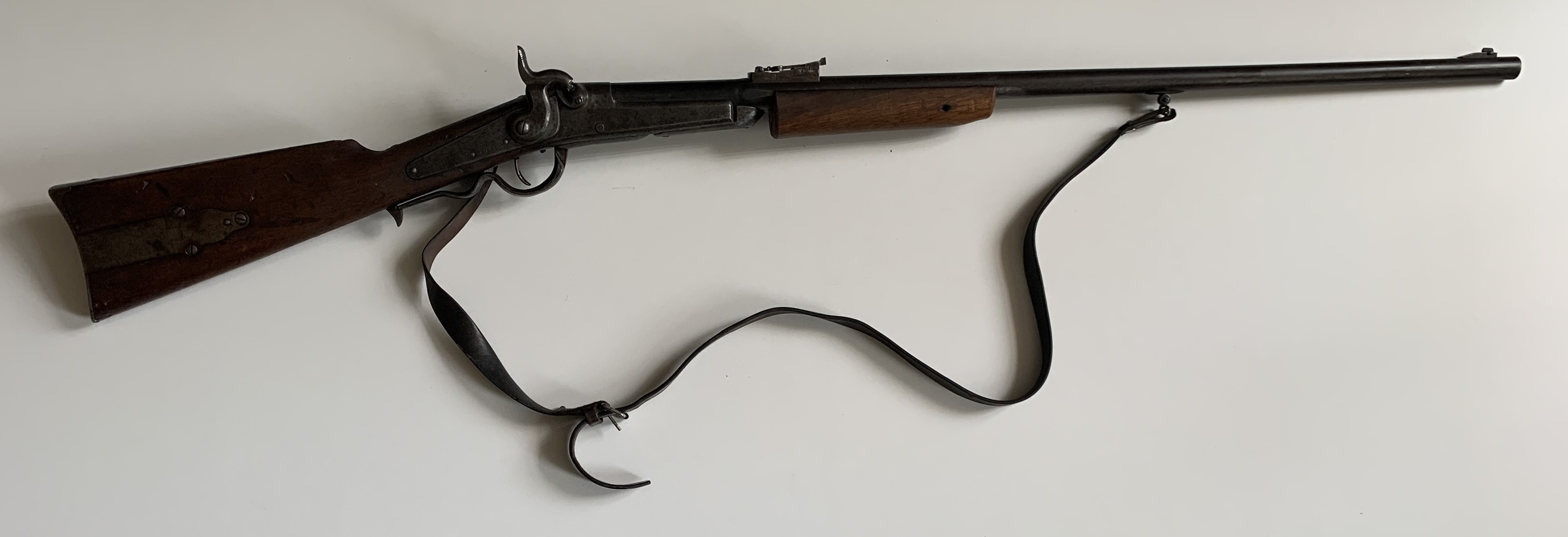
Right Side - Gallager

In 1870, Schuyler, Hartley and Graham of New York City purchased from the Government 2,500 of the Gallagers chambered for the Spencer cartridge at a cost of $12.25 each and shipped them to France for the Franco-Prussian War.

The Gallager carbines, after the warfare in the 19th century, were modified in various variants for private use by shooters, due to their solid workmanship.

They can now be found on the collector market in the US and Europe in various calibers.

== Gallager carbine replica ==
Erma Werke in Germany manufactured a Gallager carbine replica in .54 caliber with barrels sourced from Lothar Walter. Contrary to popular belief, the barrels were not repurposed WW2 German machine gun barrels. Various vendors still offer new turned brass cartridges cases (40 grain black powder) and the fitting .541 cal (334 grain) heeled bullets for the Erma Gallager.

== See also ==
- Rifles in the American Civil War
