= NGC 3006 =

Galaxy in the constellation Ursa Major

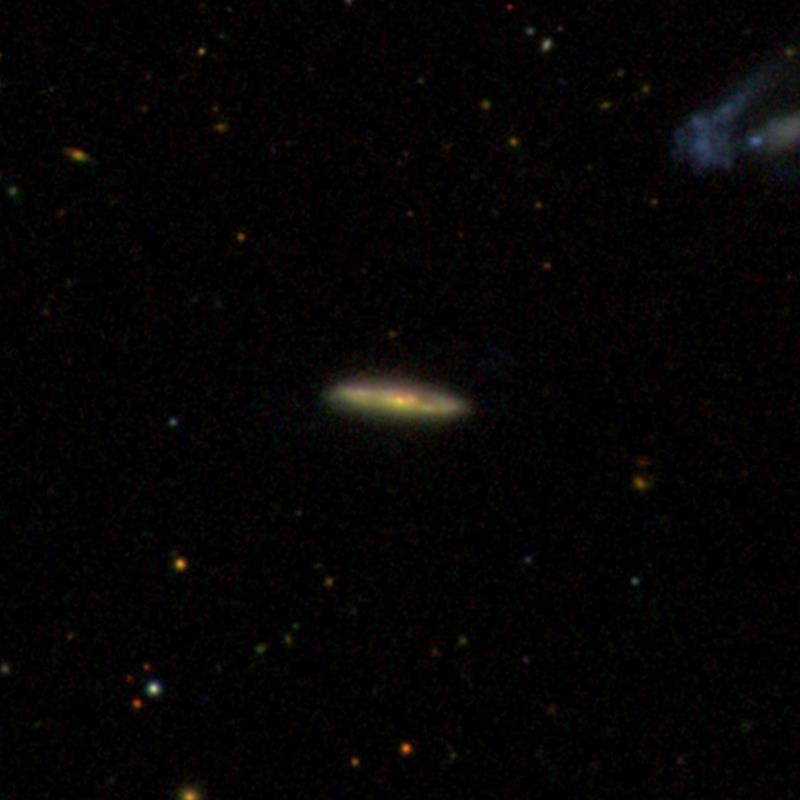
- SDSS image of NGC 3006

Observation data (J2000 epoch)
- Constellation: Ursa Major
- Right ascension: 09^{h} 49^{m} 17.344^{s}
- Declination: +44° 01′ 32.90″
- Redshift: 0.01601
- Heliocentric radial velocity: 4761 km/s
- Distance: 241.3 ± 16.9 Mly (73.97 ± 5.18 Mpc)
- Apparent magnitude (B): 15.57
- Absolute magnitude (B): −19.50

Characteristics
- Type: Sbc

Other designations
- MCG +07-20-055, PGC 28235

NGC 3006 is an edge-on spiral galaxy in the constellation Ursa Major. It has an apparent magnitude of 15. It was discovered by the astronomer Bindon Stoney on January 25, 1851.

It is part of a small group of galaxies including NGC 2998, NGC 3002, NGC 3005, NGC 3008, and MCG+07-20-052.
