= EMP 44 =

German prototype submachine gun

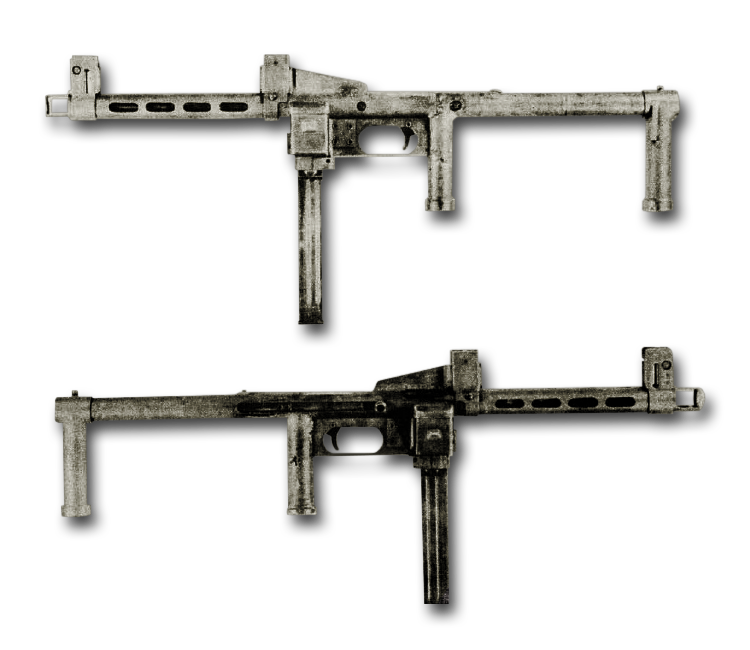
- Type: Submachine gun
- Place of origin: Nazi Germany

Service history
- Wars: World War II

Production history
- Designed: 1942
- Manufacturer: Erma Werke

Specifications
- Length: 720 mm (28.3 in)
- Cartridge: 9×19mm Parabellum
- Action: Straight blowback,
- Rate of fire: 500 rounds/minute
- Effective firing range: 150-200 meters
- Feed system: Two 32-round detachable box magazines
- Sights: Fixed Iron Sight

The EMP 44 was a prototype, all-metal submachine gun produced by Erma Werke in 1943. It was rejected by the Heereswaffenamt.

== Design ==
The EMP 44 fires from an open bolt. The caliber is 9×19mm Parabellum. The length of the gun is 892–950 mm depending on stock position. The barrel length is either 250 or 308 mm long. Its rate of fire is 500 rounds per minute and has sliding two 32-round MP 40 magazine wells. The practical range was 150–200 meters.

The gun was crudely assembled with a stock made of pipes welded together. This was part of its design philosophy for the weapon was created in response to the requirements of the Primitiv-Waffen-Programm, more or less in an attempt to imitate the British Sten gun and to a lesser extent the PPSh-41. Ultimately, its crude looking design was what made it to be rejected by the German army.

The gun was probably designed in 1942, with the sole exemplar known having serial number 15, and having February 1943 as its manufacture date. One theory as to fate of the prototypes is that most were cannibalized for their dual feed mechanism which was then installed on MP40/I.

== History ==
The wide use of submachine guns by the German armed forces in the Second World War led to a strong dependence on the industrial capacity of arms factories that brought out simplified designs at lower production costs. In 1944, Erma, the main MP 40 producer, submitted the EMP 44. The receiver was produced out of welded steel tubing like the Sten. The flash suppressor was formed in the same manner as the Russian machine pistol PPS-43 muzzle brake from stamped steel. The EMP 44 was rejected due to its failure to pass acceptance tests, but mainly because new weapons like the MP 44/STG 44 were already produced with the goal to replace both the MP 40 and the Karabiner 98k.

== See also ==
- Erma EMP
- MP 3008
