= NGC 3005 =

Galaxy in the constellation Ursa Major

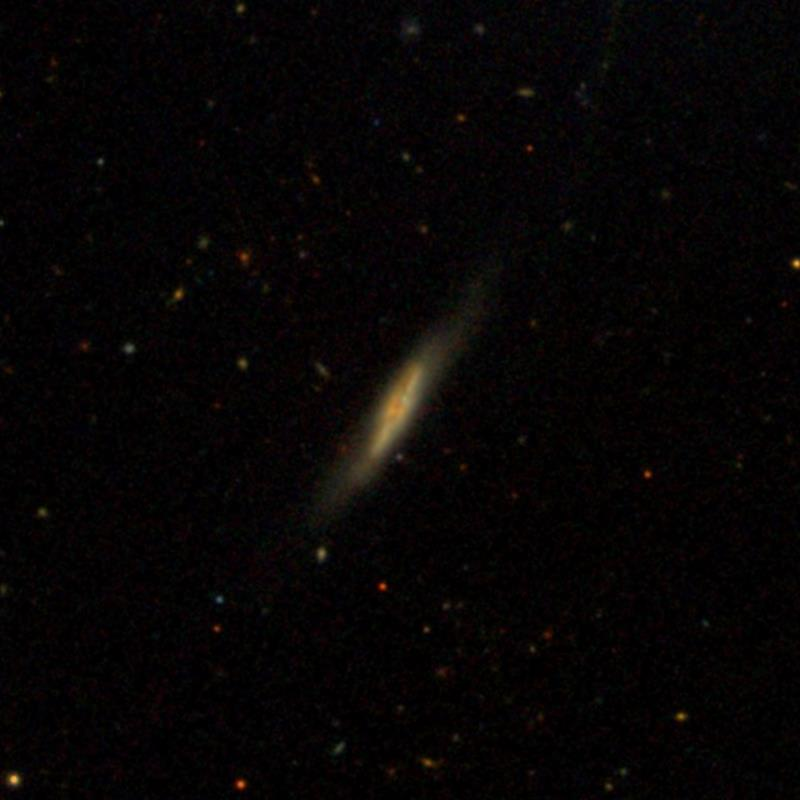
- SDSS image of NGC 3005

Observation data (J2000 epoch)
- Constellation: Ursa Major
- Right ascension: 09^{h} 49^{m} 15.007^{s}
- Declination: +44° 07′ 52.86″
- Redshift: 0.01521
- Heliocentric radial velocity: 4525 km/s
- Distance: 229.0 ± 16.0 Mly (70.21 ± 4.92 Mpc)
- Apparent magnitude (B): 14.94

Characteristics
- Type: SABc

Other designations
- MCG +07-20-054, PGC 28232

NGC 3005 is an edge-on spiral galaxy in the constellation of Ursa Major, discovered by Bindon Stoney on January 25, 1851. It is a member of the NGC 2998 group, which also includes NGC 2998, NGC 3002, NGC 3006, NGC 3008, and a few others.
