= Erma EMP =

German submachine gun

EMP
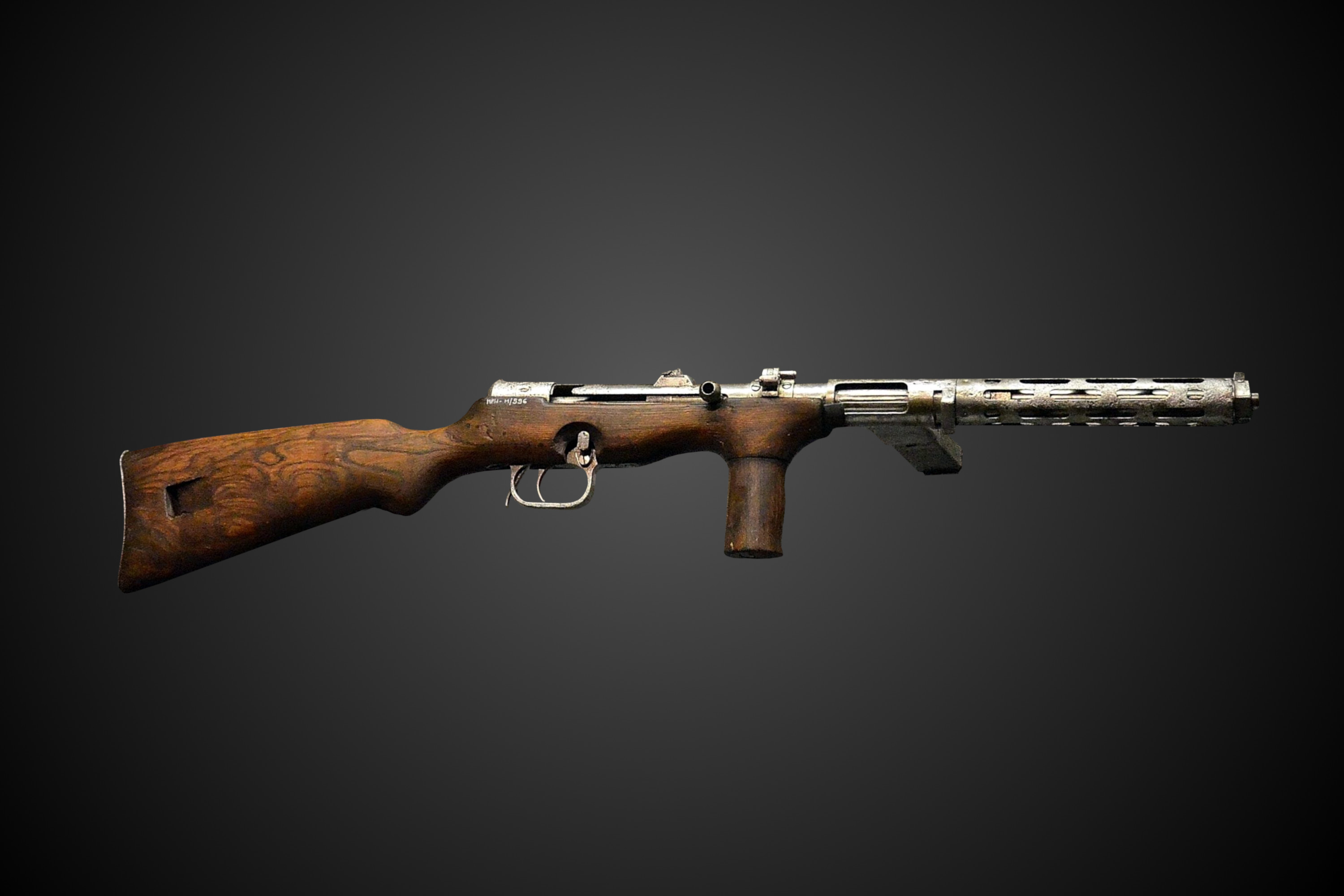
- An EMP displayed in Warsaw Uprising Museum
- Type: Submachine gun
- Place of origin: Germany

Service history
- In service: 1931–1958
- Used by: See Users
- Wars: Chaco War; Spanish Civil War; Second Sino-Japanese War; World War II; Ifni War

Production history
- Designed: 1930
- Manufacturer: Erma Werke
- Produced: 1931–1938
- No. built: Approx.10,000

Specifications
- Mass: 4 kg (8 lb 13 oz)
- Length: 95 cm (37 in)
- Barrel length: 32 cm (13 in)
- Cartridge: 9×19mm Parabellum, 7.63×25mm Mauser, 9×23mm Largo, 7.65×21mm Parabellum
- Caliber: 9 mm
- Action: Blowback
- Rate of fire: 550 rpm
- Muzzle velocity: 380 m/s (1,200 ft/s)
- Effective firing range: 150 m (490 ft)
- Maximum firing range: 250 m (820 ft)
- Feed system: 32-round magazine
- Sights: Iron

The German submachine gun EMP (Erma Maschinenpistole) also known as MPE (Maschinenpistole Erma) was produced by the Erma factory, and was based on designs acquired from Heinrich Vollmer. The gun was produced from 1931 to 1938 in roughly 10,000 copies (in three main variants) and exported to Spain, Mexico, China and Yugoslavia, but also used domestically by the SS. It was produced under license in Spain by the arsenal of A Coruña under the designation M41/44.

== History ==
In the early 1920s, Vollmer started to develop his own sub-machineguns. His early models, named VPG, VPGa, VPF and VMP1925 were fairly similar to the MP18. The VMP1925 had a wooden handgrip and was fed by a 25-round drum magazine. The VMP1925 was secretly tested by the Reichswehr, along with competing designs from Schmeisser and Rheinmetall. (The Reichswehr was prohibited by the Versailles Treaty from having sub-machine guns in service, although the German police were allowed to carry a small number.) Secret funding was given to Vollmer to continue development, and this resulted in the VMP1926, which mostly differed from its predecessor by the removal of the cooling jacket. A subsequent development was the VMP1928, which introduced a 32-round box magazine sticking from the left side. The final development of this series was the VMP1930. (It can also be seen at the WTS.) This model introduced a substantive innovation—a telescoping main spring assembly, which made the gun more reliable and easier to assemble and disassemble in the field. Vollemer applied for a patent for his innovation in 1930 and it was granted in 1933 as DRP# 580620. His company, Vollmer Werke, produced however only about 400 of these, and most were sold to Bulgaria. In late 1930, the Reichswehr stopped supporting Vollmer financially; consequently he sold the rights to all his designs to the company known as Erma Werke (which is an abbreviation for Erfurter Maschinenfabrik, Berthold Geipel GmbH).

The submachine guns that Erma started to sell in 1932 under the names EMP (Erma Maschinenpistole) or MPE (Maschinenpistole Erma) was basically just the VMP1930 with the cooling jacket restored. Although there were several variants with varying barrel lengths and sights made to customers' specifications, roughly three main variants were produced: one with a 30 cm barrel, tangent rear sight and bayonet lug was apparently sold to Bulgaria or Yugoslavia. The second model, sometimes called the MP34, or the "standard model", had a 25 cm barrel and no provision for a bayonet; the rear sight on these varies—some had a tangent sight, others a simplified flip-up "L" sight. A third variant was basically similar in the metallic parts, but replaced the foregrip with an MP18-style stock with finger-grooves. Overall, at least 10,000 of these Vollmer-based designs were made by Erma. They were adopted by the SS and the German Police, but also sold to Mexico, Yugoslavia and Spain. During the Spanish Civil War, the EMP was used by both the Republicans and the Nationalists.

In the spring of 1939, a large number of defeated Spanish Republicans fled to France, where they were disarmed. Some 3,250 EMPs formerly in the possession of these fighters ended up in a French warehouse at Clermont-Ferrand. The EMPs were usually referred to as the "Erma–Vollmer" in French documents. The French tested the weapons and decided to adopt them for their own service. A provisional manual was printed in French as Provisoire sur le pistolet-mitrailleur Erma – Vollmer de 9mm, issued on December 26, 1939 and updated on January 6, 1940. However, the French had obtained only some 1,540 suitable magazines for these guns, which hampered their deployment to frontline units. An order was placed for an additional 8,000 magazines following the outbreak of the Second World War, and an initial batch of 100 weapons and 300 magazines were issued to frontline troops by the beginning of 1940.

Erma submachine guns were issued in batches to frontline units as they became available; by 5 January 1940 a further 200 weapons and 600 magazines had been sent to frontline units, while an additional 200 guns had been successfully tested but lacked magazines. On 9 May 1940 French headquarters authorized the distribution of a further 500 weapons to the 5th Motorized Infantry Division, 6th Colonial Infantry Division, 13th Infantry Division and 32nd Infantry Division, as well as to 8th Army headquarters. Each division was to receive 116 weapons: 36 for each infantry regiment, with the intention to provide one submachine gun to each platoon, and 8 for the divisional reconnaissance battalion. The 8th Army headquarters received 36 EMPs as sector-level weapons to be distributed to raiding parties for specific missions. Each EMP was to be issued with three magazines. Another 500 Erma weapons were issued on 26 May: 116 each for the 23rd Infantry Division, 28th Infantry Division, 29th Infantry Division and 87th African Infantry Division, 15 each for the headquarters of the 6th and 7th Armies, and 6 for the headquarters of Army Group 3.

After the Germans conquered France, some EMPs armed the Legion of French Volunteers Against Bolshevism, which eventually became part of the SS Charlemagne division. This division was practically destroyed in February 1945 in Eastern Prussia, now part of Poland. Numerous EMPs have been found in the last-stand battlefields of the SS Charlemagne division; most of these guns lack any German military stamps or marks. The EMPs which arrived in German hands via the French route were given the (Fremdgerät) designation 740(f). The Yugoslav purchased EMPs were used by both the Partisans and the Chetniks.

In Francoist Spain, the EMP, chambered in the 9mm Largo cartridge, was locally produced until the mid-1950s. It was designated Model 1941/44 or "subfusil Coruña" but commonly known as Naranjero. It performed poorly during the Ifni War.

== Design ==
Its arming lever is on the right. The magazine housing, which is on the left, is slightly canted forwards to assist in feeding ammunition. The weapon could be fired either in semi-automatic or fully automatic modes.

== Influence ==
The final development at Erma is known as the EMP 36. This can be considered an intermediate model between the EMP and the MP38. Although many details of the mechanism were changed from the EMP, it retained Vollmer's telescoping main operating spring basically unchanged. On the exterior, the most obvious differences are that the magazine housing was now almost vertical, although still canted slightly to the left and forward. The solid wood stock was replaced with a wood frame and a folding metal butt. It is not entirely clear who designed the EMP 36, although Berthold Geipel himself is usually credited. Apparently, the features of the new design were the result of another secret contract with the German army. The EMP's telescopic cylinder return spring guide was retained for the Maschinenpistole 38.

== Users ==
- Bolivia: Vollmer VPK supplied as German aid during the Chaco War
- Bulgaria
- France: Over 3,000 Spanish copies obtained from demobilized Republican refugees after the Spanish Civil War; pressed into service during the Battle of France
  - Vichy France: Continued issue to the Armistice Army
- Germany: Predominantly to the SS, Einsatzgruppen, and auxiliary security forces
- China: Purchased and copied in small numbers during the Second-Sino Japanese War
- Mexico
- Norway: The Norwegian Police Service Assault Group (Statspolitiet) purchased 8 VMP submachine guns in 1932
- Paraguay: Captured Bolivian guns
- Poland: Erma EMP obtained for trial purposes, possibly issued to police forces and the presidential guard
- Spain: Several thousand unlicensed copies manufactured by the Republicans during the Spanish Civil War
- Spain: Unlicensed production continued under the Francoist regime at Coruña Arsenal, under the designations Modelo 41 and Modelo 41/44
- Yugoslavia: in 9×19mm Parabellum

== See also ==
- MP 40
- PM wz. 39M
- EMP 44
- List of submachine guns
- List of World War II firearms of Germany
