= NGC 3008 =

Galaxy in the constellation Ursa Major

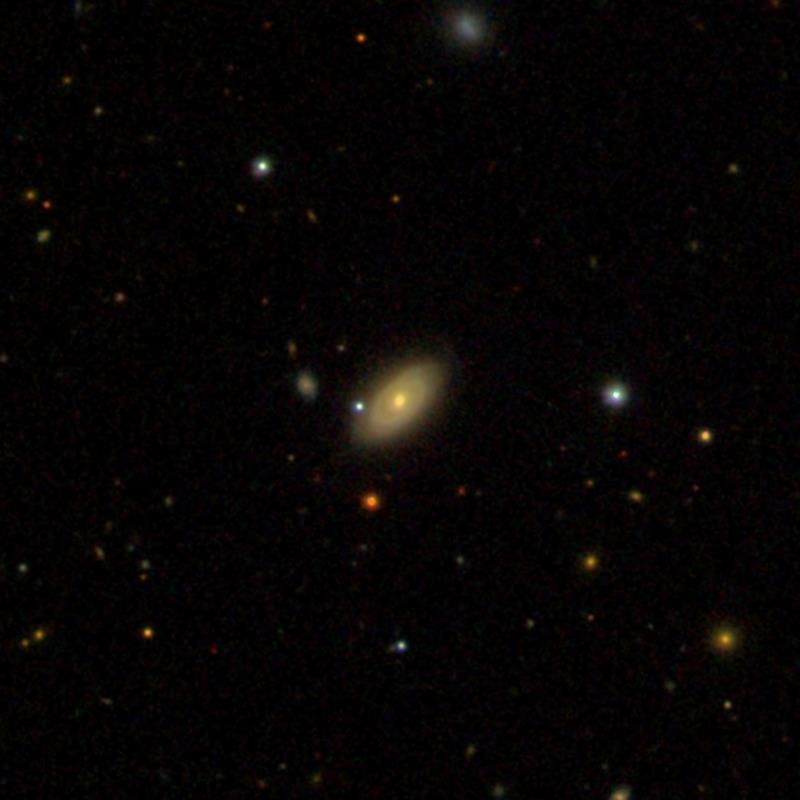
- SDSS image of NGC 3008

Observation data (J2000 epoch)
- Constellation: Ursa Major
- Right ascension: 09^{h} 49^{m} 34.261^{s}
- Declination: +44° 06′ 09.71″
- Redshift: 0.01595
- Heliocentric radial velocity: 4783 km/s
- Distance: 240.5 ± 16.9 Mly (73.73 ± 5.18 Mpc)
- Group or cluster: NGC 2998 group
- Apparent magnitude (B): 15.23

Characteristics
- Type: S0/a

Other designations
- MCG +07-20-059, PGC 28252

NGC 3008 is a lenticular galaxy with an active galactic nucleus in the constellation of Ursa Major, discovered by William Parsons and his assistants. It is about 40 thousand light years across, and with a recessional velocity of about 4,785 kilometers per second, is at a distance of 240 million light-years from the Sun.

It is a member of the NGC 2998 group, which also includes NGC 2998, NGC 3002, NGC 3005, NGC 3006, and a few others. Among these galaxies, it has the lowest star formation rate, at 0.02 M_{☉} per year.
