= MP 3008 =

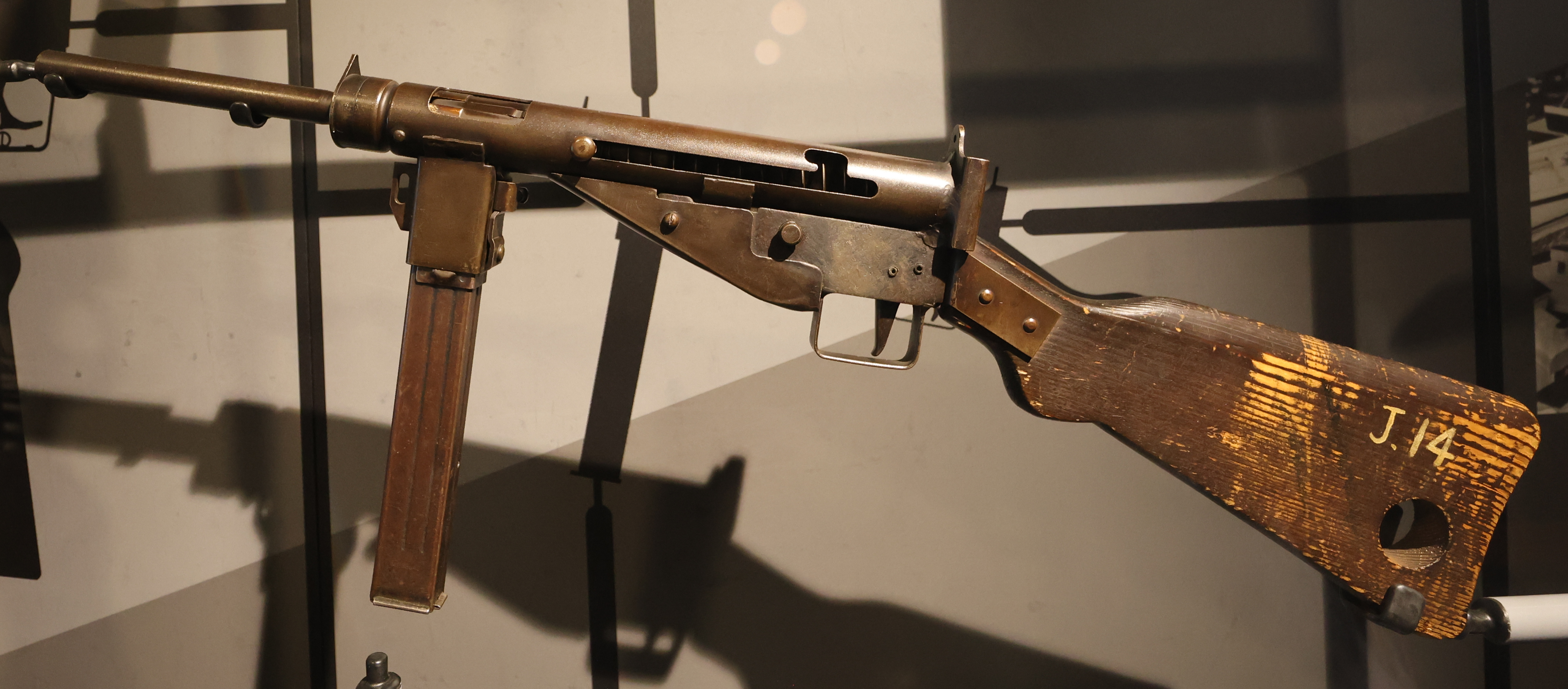
- MP 3008 at the royal armouries
- Type: Submachine gun
- Place of origin: Nazi Germany

Service history
- In service: January–May 1945
- Used by: Volkssturm; Czechoslovak Army (after World War II)
- Wars: World War II

Production history
- Designer: Ludwig Vorgrimler
- Designed: 1944
- Produced: January–May 1945
- No. built: Approx. 10,000
- Variants: Gerät Potsdam

Specifications
- Mass: 3.2 kg (7.05 lb)
- Length: 760 mm (29.9 in)
- Barrel length: 196 mm (7.7 in)
- Cartridge: 9×19mm Parabellum
- Action: Blowback, open bolt
- Rate of fire: 450 rounds/min
- Muzzle velocity: 365 m/s (1,198 ft/s)
- Effective firing range: 100 m
- Feed system: 32-round detachable box magazine for MP40
- Sights: Front blade, rear aperture

The 9×19mm MP 3008 (Maschinenpistole 3008 or "machine pistol 3008", also Volks-MP.3008 and Gerät Neumünster) was a German last ditch submachine gun manufactured towards the end of World War II in early 1945.

Also known as the Volksmaschinenpistole ("people's machine pistol"), the weapon was based on the Sten Mk II submachine gun, except for its vertical magazine; some had additional pistol grips.

The MP 3008 was an emergency measure, designed at a time when Germany was at the point of collapse. Desperately short of raw materials, the Germans sought to produce a radically cheaper alternative to their standard submachine gun, the MP 40.

The MP 3008 was a simple blowback design operating from an open bolt. It was crudely manufactured in small machine shops and variations were common. Typically, the magazine was bottom-mounted unlike the side-mounted Sten. Initially all steel without handgrips, the wire buttstock was welded to the frame and was typically triangular, however the design changed as conditions inside Germany worsened and on final guns wooden stocks and other variations are found.

The Gerät Potsdam (MP 749 (e)), another, earlier, version of the Sten Mk II produced by Mauser in 1944, was an exact copy of the original Sten, right down to its manufacturing stamps in an effort to conceal its origin for clandestine operations. About 28,000 were claimed to have been produced, but postwar interrogations of highly ranked Mauser personnel failed to provide proof that any more than 10,000 units had been made: 9972 are shown to have been delivered and accepted in the records of the Mauser company.

== See also ==
- Austen submachine gun: an Australian design based on the Sten and the German MP40.
- EMP 44: a separate German design analogous to the Sten; prototype only.
- HIW VSK: a carbine intended for use by the Volkssturm.
- Volkssturmgewehr 1-5: a semi-automatic rifle intended for use by the Volkssturm.
- Wimmersperg Spz-kr: late war machine pistol that included Sten/MP 3008 components.
- Volkssturm
- Werwolf
- List of World War II firearms of Germany
