= NGC 2998 =

Galaxy in the constellation Ursa Major

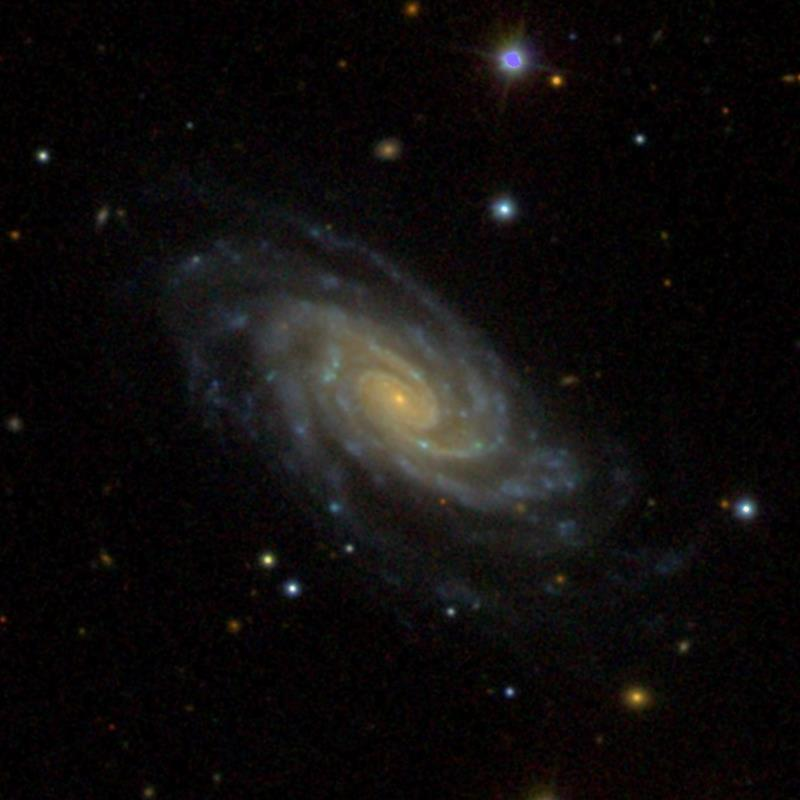
- SDSS image of NGC 2998

Observation data (J2000 epoch)
- Constellation: Ursa Major
- Right ascension: 09^{h} 48^{m} 43.630^{s}
- Declination: +44° 04′ 52.63″
- Redshift: 0.01591
- Heliocentric radial velocity: 4732 ± 3 km/s
- Distance: 195 Mly (59.7 Mpc)
- Apparent magnitude (B): 13.3

Characteristics
- Type: SAB(rs)c
- Apparent size (V): 1.080′ × 0.562′

Other designations
- NGC 2998, UGC 5250, MCG +07-20-051, PGC 28196

NGC 2998 is a barred spiral galaxy located in the constellation Ursa Major. It is 195 million light-years (59.7 megaparsecs) away from the Earth. It is an intermediate spiral galaxy. Its stellar mass is about that of the Milky Way.

NGC 2998 is a member of the eponymous NGC 2998 group, a relatively dense galaxy group which also includes NGC 3002, NGC 3005, NGC 3006, NGC 3008 and a few others.

== Supernova ==
One supernova has been observed in NGC 2998:

- SN 2026acpp (Type IIb, mag. 17.7) was discovered by Kōichi Itagaki on 21 September 2026. SN 2026acpp (ZTF26abyamcg) is part of the Unistellar "cosmic cataclysms" smart telescope tracking project.

== See also ==
- List of NGC objects (2001–3000)
