= NGC 5371 =

Galaxy in constellation Canes Venatici

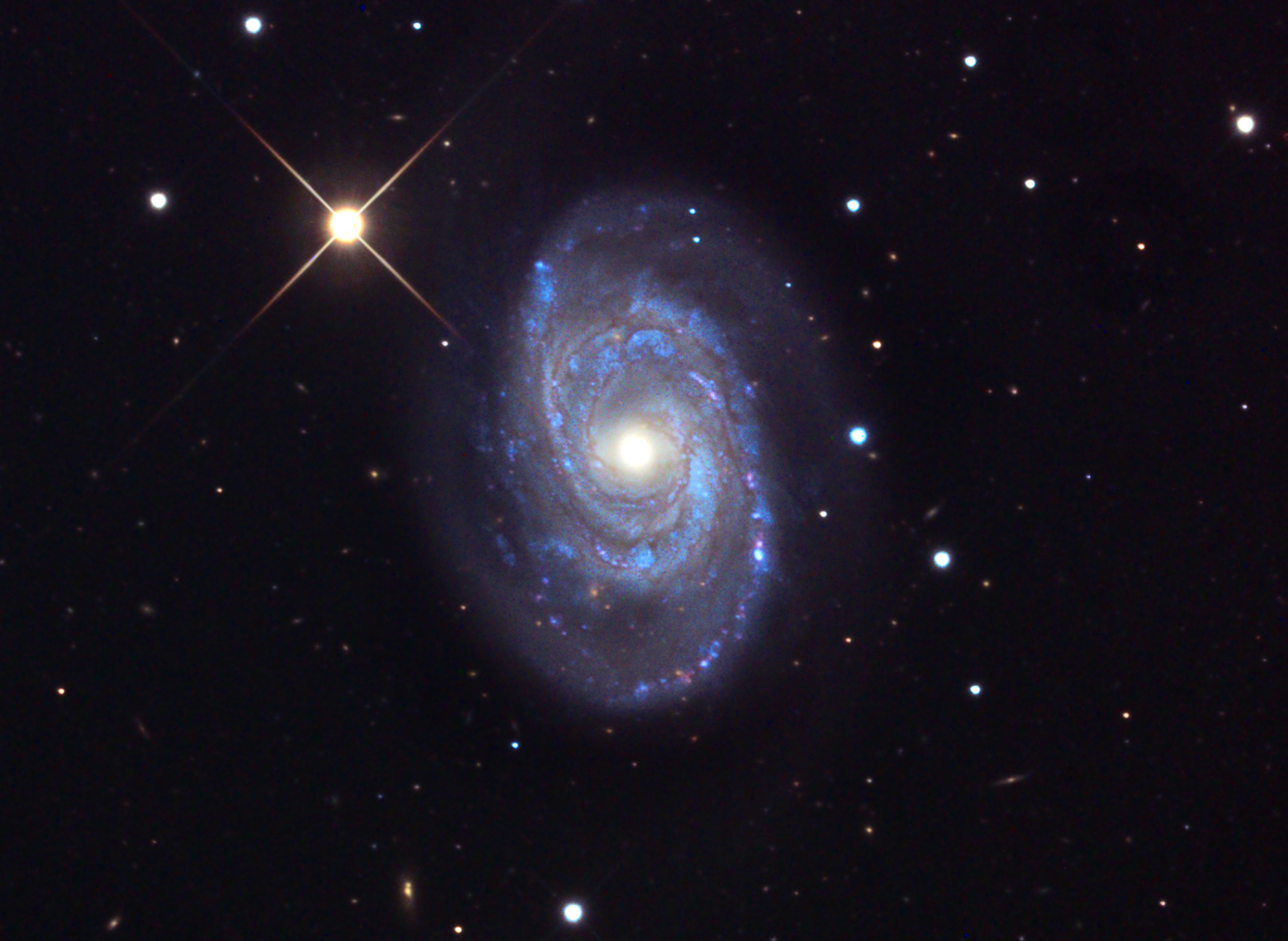
- NGC 5371 imaged by a 24 inch telescope

Observation data (J2000 epoch)
- Constellation: Canes Venatici
- Right ascension: 13^{h} 55^{m} 39.9^{s}
- Declination: +40° 27′ 42.4″
- Redshift: 0.00850±0.00019
- Heliocentric radial velocity: 2,552±1 km/s
- Distance: 129.5 ± 32.4 Mly (39.70 ± 9.92 Mpc)
- Apparent magnitude (V): 11.3

Characteristics
- Type: SAB(rs)bc
- Mass: 1.86×10^{11} (baryonic) M_{☉}
- Size: 146,000 ly (44.80 kpc)
- Apparent size (V): 4.4′ × 3.5′

Other designations
- NGC 5371 and 5390, UGC 8846, PGC 49514

NGC 5371 is a face-on spiral galaxy in the northern constellation Canes Venatici. It was discovered on January 14, 1788 by German-British astronomer William Herschel. The nearby NGC 5390 appears to be a duplicate entry for NGC 5371, since there is nothing at the former's position. NGC 5371 has an apparent magnitude of 11.3 and an angular size of 4.4′ × 3.5′. It is located at a distance of 129.5 ± 32.4 million light-years (39.70 ± 9.92 Mpc) from the Milky Way, and is receding with a heliocentric radial velocity of 2,552 km/s. The galaxy appears to be weakly interacting with the nearby, equidistant Hickson 68 group of galaxies, and thus may be a member. Collectively, they are sometimes dubbed the Big Lick galaxy group, after the city of Roanoke, Virginia.

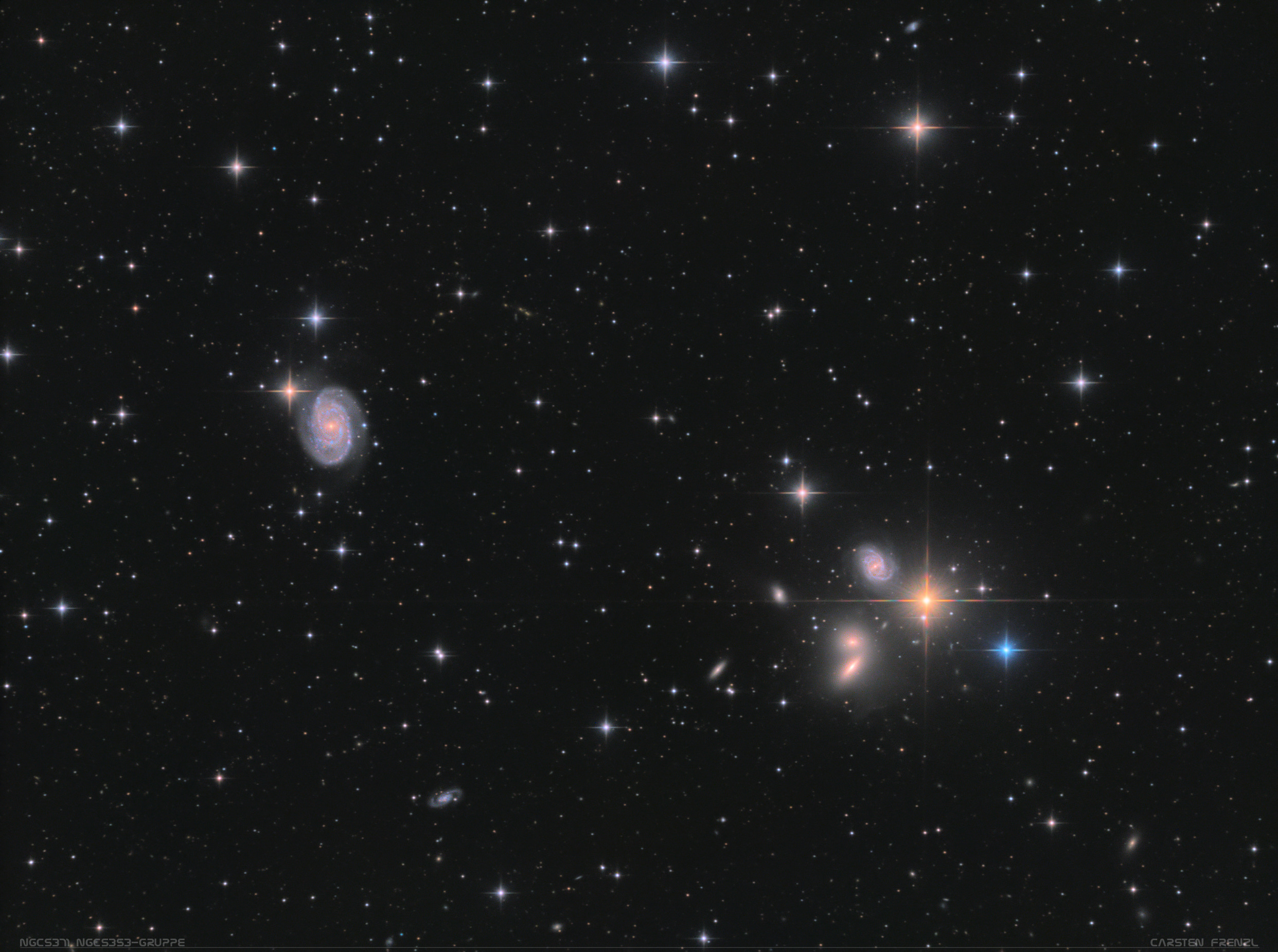
NGC 5371 (left) and Hickson 68 (right)

The morphological classification of NGC 5371 in the De Vaucouleurs system is SAB(rs)bc, indicating a weakly barred spiral galaxy (SAB) with a transitional inner ring structure (rs), and moderately wound spiral arms (bc). The galactic plane is inclined at an angle of 45°±5° to the plane of the sky, with the major axis oriented along a position angle of 195°±3°. This is classified as a LINER-type galaxy and may be in a post-starburst phase. There is an extended or double source of X-ray emission.

== Supernovae ==
Two supernovae have been observed in NGC 5371:

- SN 1994Y (Type II-L, mag. 15) was discovered by William Wren on 19 August 1994, reaching peak B magnitude of 14.2 on August 30.
- SN 2020bio (Type IIb, mag. 16.7) was discovered by Kōichi Itagaki on January 29, 2020. The progenitor may have undergone extensive mass loss, shedding nearly all of its hydrogen envelope.
