= Joint Service Small Arms Program =

American weapon standardization coordination program

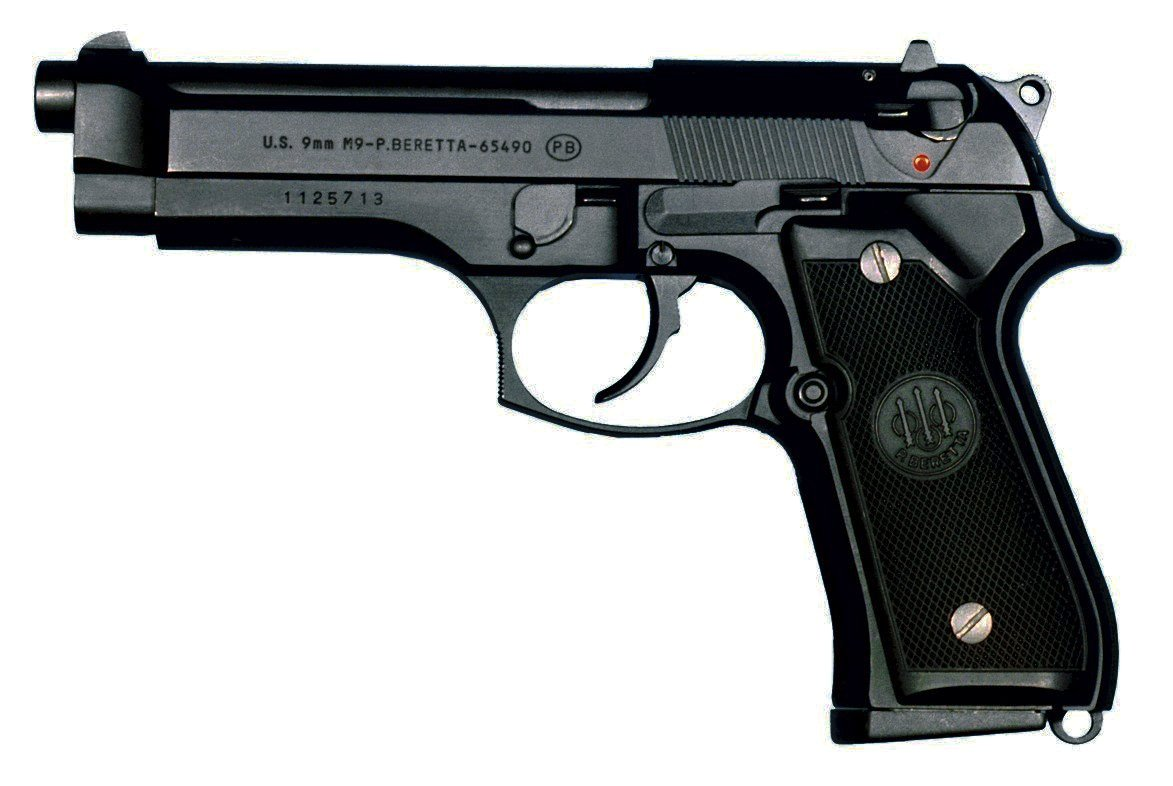
Beretta M9

The Joint Service Small Arms Program, abbreviated JSSAP, is an office that was created in 1978 to coordinate weapon standardization between the various United States military service branches, including the army, navy, marine Corps and later the USCG and SOCOM.

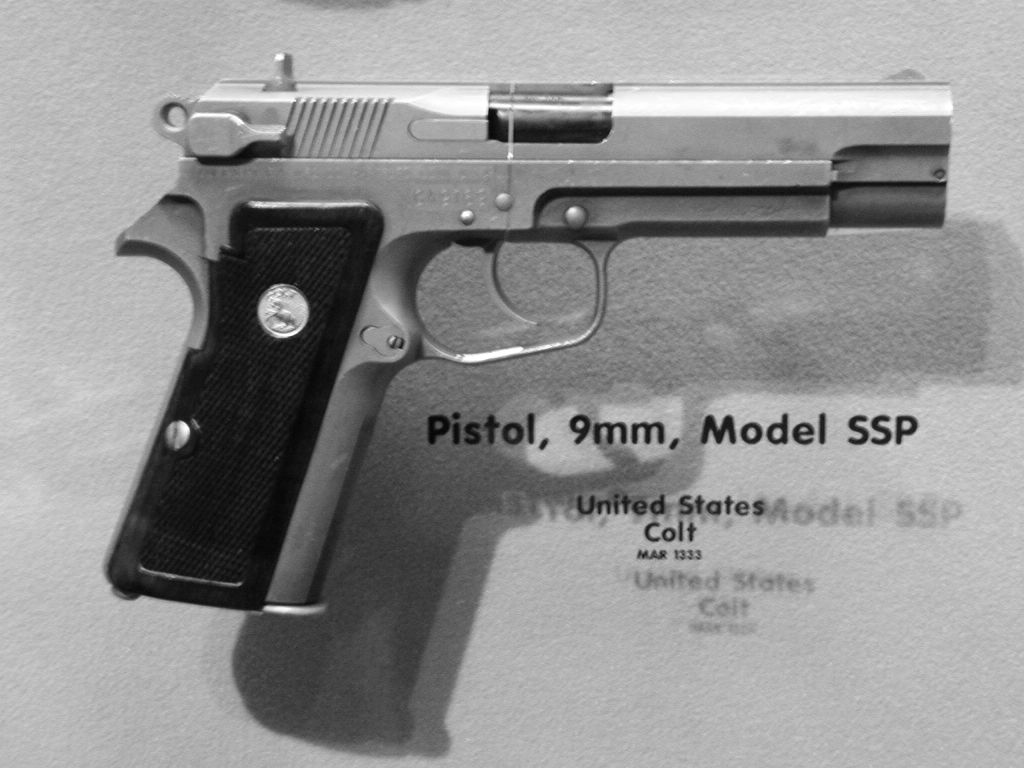
Colt Stainless Steel Pistol

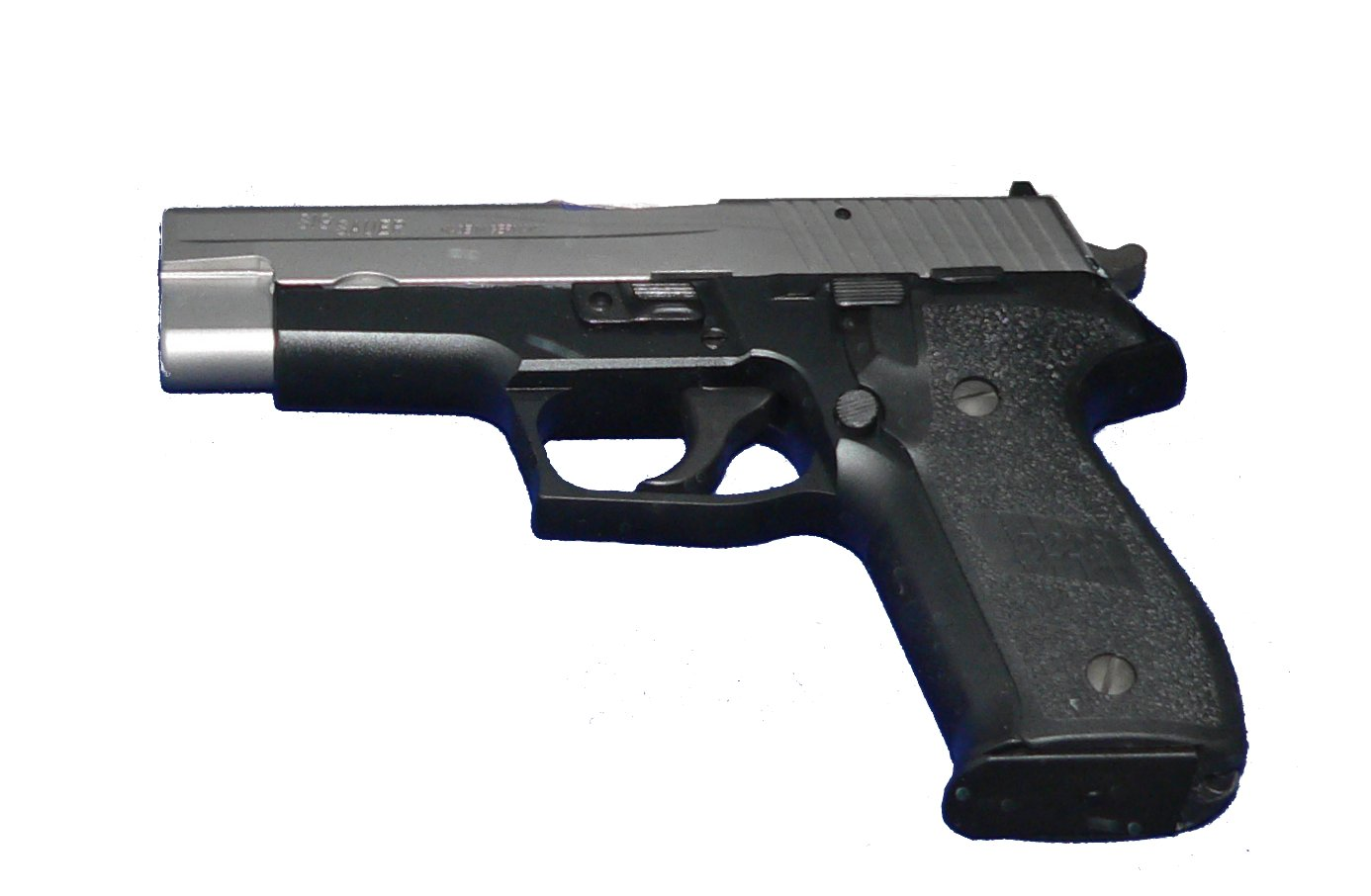
SIG Sauer P226

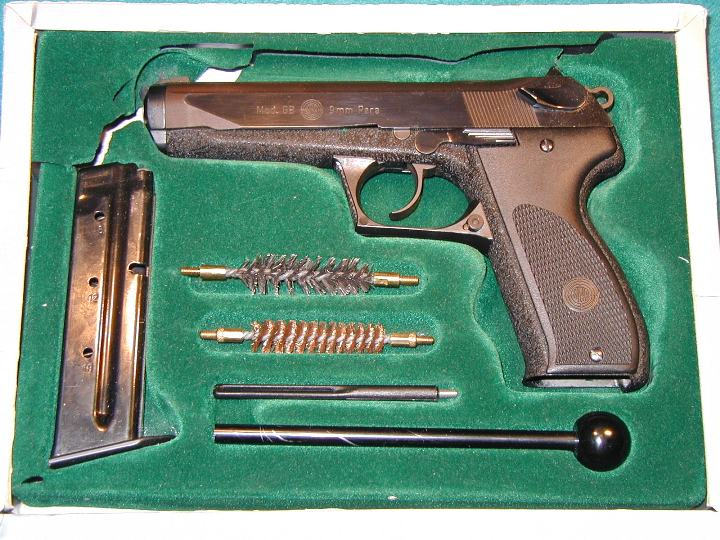
Steyr GB

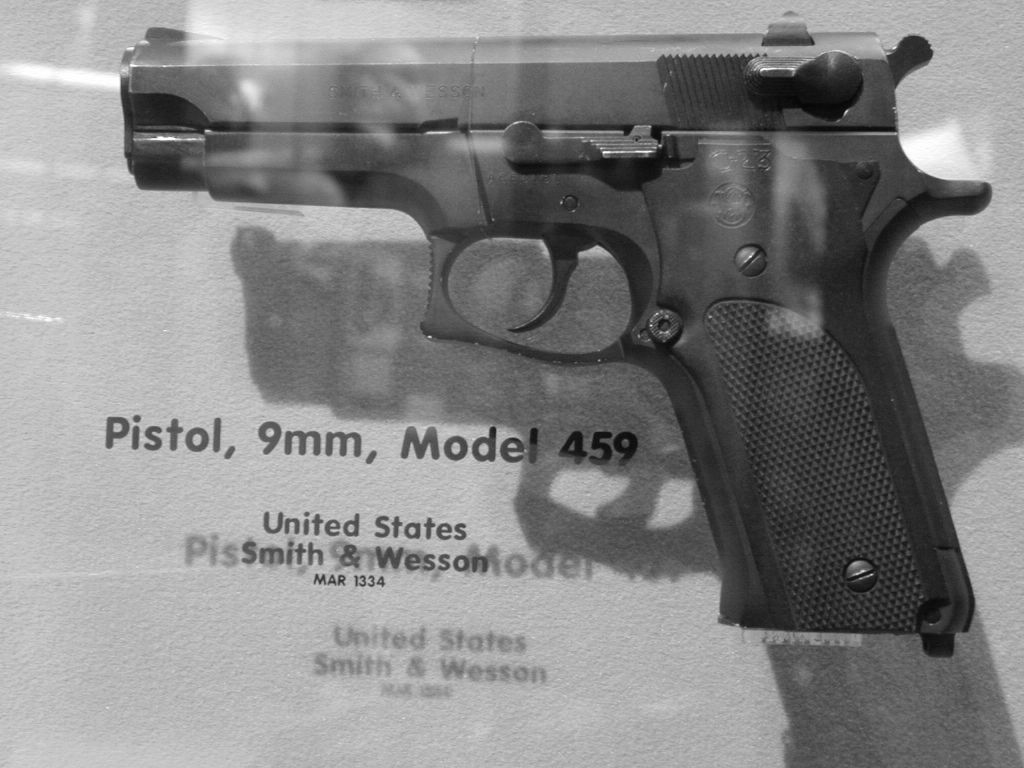
Smith & Wesson 459A

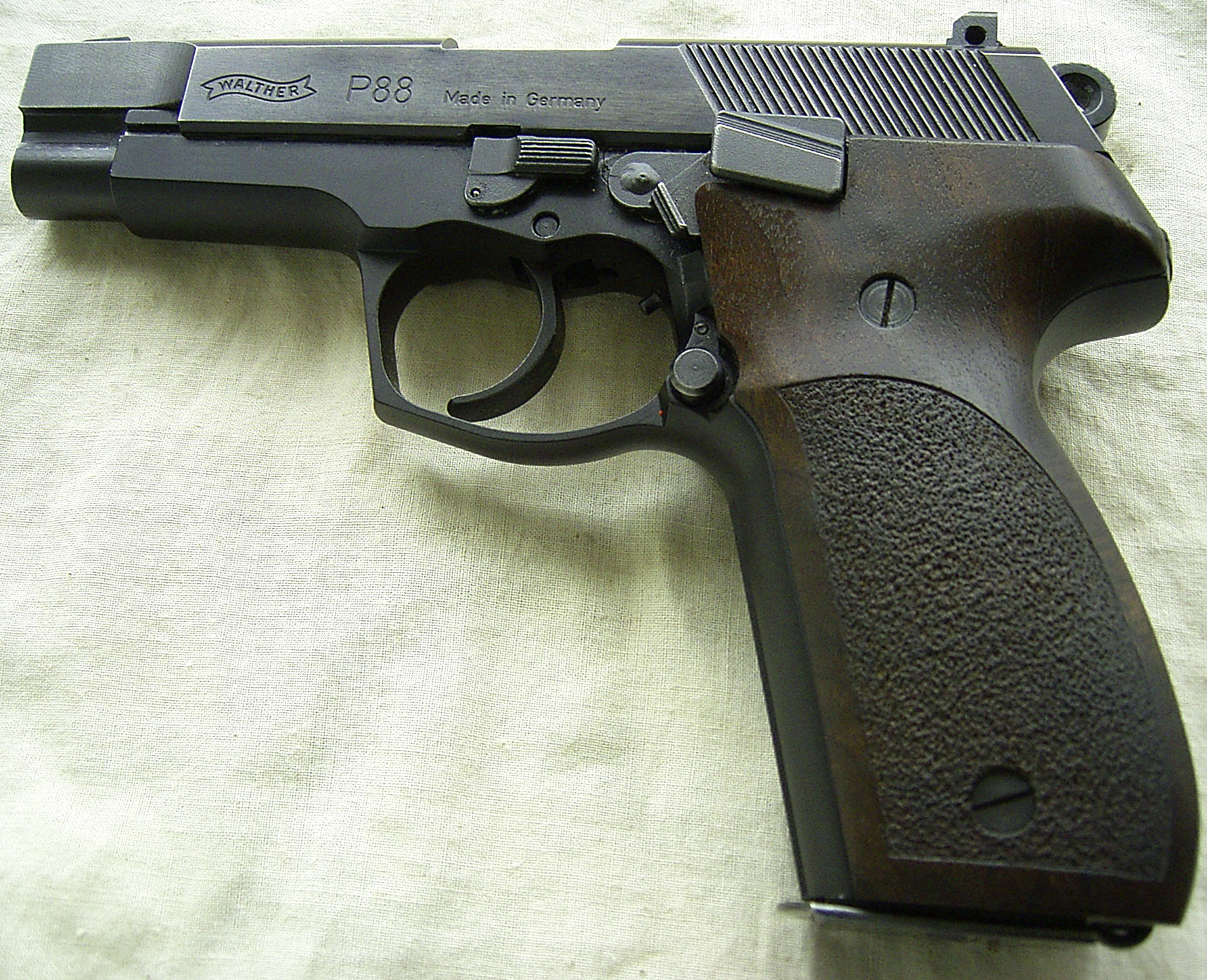
Walther P88

== History ==
In 1962, the US Air Force adopted the Smith & Wesson Model 15 revolver over the M1911A1. By 1977 their inventory was wearing out, and the USAF requested special ammunition for the M15 to improve its effectiveness due to malfunctions it suffered.

A subsequent Congressional investigation revealed that the USAF had 25 different handguns in inventory. Congressman Addabbo from New York said, "The current proliferation of handguns and handgun ammunition in Air Force inventory is intolerable." Congress encouraged DOD to select a standard handgun and phase out all others.

This task was assigned to the newly created Joint Service Small Arms Program (JSSAP).

The United States Military forces had been using a variety of different small arms which grew over the years to about ten different types of handguns. Models in use included the M1911A1 (Colt .45 Automatic), Smith & Wesson (Combat Masterpiece in .38 Special caliber), Smith and Wesson Model 1917 (.45 ACP and .45 Auto Rim) and various other small arms. By the 1970s it became obvious that the M1911A1 (Colt Government .45ACP) model was going to have to be replaced.

The program to purchase the new standardized handgun was designated the XM9 program. There were 85 criteria for handgun characteristics that must be met to satisfy the procurement requirements.

=== XM9 requirements ===
Of the 85 requirements for the new handgun, 72 were mandatory, and 13 were optional. Basic Requirements:

- Chambered in 9mm NATO caliber
- Detachable magazine with capacity of at least 13 rounds
- Magazine catch which ejects magazine without the use of the second hand
- First round trigger pull to be double action, followups single action
- Slide stop that locks slide open when the magazine is empty
- Durability of 5000 rounds with no more than 8 malfunctions

Safety System:

- Thumb-safety system ambidextrous
- De-cocking device to safely lower a cocked hammer
- Firing pin block when the hammer is lowered

The Air Force invited several makers to compete in this testing program.

JOINT SERVICE SMALL ARMS SYNCHRONIZATION TEAM (JSSAST)

Key Responsibilities:

- Review and approve annual updates to Joint Service Small Arms capability gaps.
- Evaluate and endorse the annual JSSAP Science & Technology project portfolio.
- Identifiy opportunities for potential joint programs across services.
- Develop and maintain a unified Joint Service Small Arms Master Plan (JSSAMP), aligning and integrating the individual strategies of each service within the DoD.

== The tests ==
A whole series of tests arranged by the Air Force included accuracy, environmental testing, and an endurance trial in which Mean Rounds Between Stoppages (MRBS) was tallied. Tests included exposure to high levels of dust, mud, extreme heat and cold, as well as human factors testing.

Human factors testing included the ability of shooters to fire accurately. There were three levels of shooters who fired these guns for accuracy.

=== First tests - USAF Eglin AFB Florida ===
The XM9 program name had not yet been assigned when these tests took place. The first round of these handgun tests occurred in 1979-1980 at Eglin Air Force Base in Northwestern Florida.

The eight pistols that were entered for the 1979-1980 trials were:

- (Italy) : Beretta entered their Beretta 92S-1 (later renamed 92SB), which would be considered the best entry of the 1979-1980 trials. In the 1984 trials, Beretta would submit 92S-1's successor, the 92SB-F (later renamed to 92F), which would be chosen and adopted as the M9 pistol in January 1985.
- (Belgium) : FN Herstal submitted two entries, the FN Browning M1935 High Power and the FN Browning Fast Action, a special double-action version of the M1935 High Power.
- : Colt's Manufacturing Company of the United States submitted the Colt SSP (stainless steel pistol), a 9×19mm Parabellum variant of the Colt Model 1971, which was an earlier attempt to develop a new service pistol to replace the M1911, with some minor mechanical alterations made for the trials. Colt submitted 30 new SSPs out of a production run of around 50, but their pistol was not selected. One example is on display at the Aberdeen Proving Ground.
- (Germany) : Heckler & Koch submitted two pistols, the Heckler & Koch P9S and the Heckler & Koch VP70. The former carried the smallest magazine of all the pistols tested, while the VP70 boasted the highest capacity magazine.
- : Smith & Wesson of the United States submitted their Smith & Wesson 459A.
- (Spain) : Star Bonifacio Echevveria S.A. submitted their Star Model 28.

The existing standard M1911A1 and the Smith & Wesson M15 .38 Special handguns were also tested to compare to those which were submitted for comparison.

==== Results of the first tests ====
Six of the submitted firearms passed the test. The Beretta 92S-1 performed the best overall and was announced as the clear winner, having exceeded the stated goals in several cases.

P9S easily won the accuracy phase of testing but fell into disfavor when its operating controls failed to adapt themselves to left-handed use. The magazine capacity (nine rounds) was one short of the desired (later required) capacity.

The Heckler & Koch VP70, with its then unusual trigger mechanism (a three round burst selection was available when the supplied stock was attached), allowed only double action firing and failed the hand-held accuracy portion of the tests. As for the endurance tests, the four P9S specimens fired a total of 18,697 rounds with 360 stoppages, producing an MRBS number of 52 (18,697/360).

The VP70 performed far worse, firing a mere 771 rounds with 137 stoppages for an MRBS of only 5. In fairness to the VP70, the ammunition used for these tests was extremely suspect. None of it approached the "hot" power ratings of the European 9mm ammunition for which Heckler & Koch—and indeed all European manufacturers—had designed their guns.

The Star Model 28, which typically has a consistent service record, experienced performance issues with low-powered cartridges. It recorded the same Mean Rounds Between Stoppages (MRBS) rate as the Heckler & Koch VP70.

Accuracy testing showed that the Air Force had been correct in their selection of the S&W M15 over the M1911A1. The shooters of the M15 performed better in accuracy than those with the M1911A1 .45 pistol. The new submission of 9mm handguns was the most accurate group. Very importantly, the 9mm accuracy was even greater over that of the M15 and M1911A1 with the least experienced shooters than it was with experienced shooters.

In durability testing the M1911A1 was experiencing 1 failure for every 748 rounds fired. The Smith & Wesson 459A was performing at 1,952 and the Beretta at 2,000. This caused controversy since the new M1911A1 pistol had achieved 6000 rounds previously. The Air Force was testing guns from existing inventory. Some observers of the test record believe that defective magazines were the reason for the M1911A1's poor performance.

The US Army used the fact that the Air Force did not replace the magazines which caused poor M1911A1 performance was cited as a reason to invalidate all test results. The Army did not like the Air Force's sand, mud, and extreme temperature testing. The Army conducts their tests of this type with rigorous accuracy recording. The Army rejected the results of the Air Force Testing.

The JSSAP program managers agree to have the test run again only in the next tests they would be conducted by the Army.

New requirements were created and the new handgun to be procured would now be called the XM9 (prototype, will be type accepted as the M9).

=== Second tests from 1981 ===
==== Results of the second tests ====
In February 1982 issued this statement; "The Army, in its role as Defense Department executive agent for 9mm handgun procurement, has cancelled the procurement. It was not possible to make an award because the submitted weapon samples substantially failed to meet the essential requirements contained in the procurement solicitation. The Department of Defense intends to reexamine its requirements for a new handgun."

This cause a firestorm of protest. Supporters in the military and Congress denounced the Army tests as rigged and a fiasco. The last line in particular was interpreted as allowing the purchase of the M1911A1 models in 9mm or .45 ACP. Colt exacerbated this thought when they subsequently offer an unsolicited proposal to convert existing M1911A1 handguns to 9mm.

The Army's response was that all the contenders had failed in areas of reliable operations in low temperature, sand and mud. No data to support this was provided. This denial was justified that since a new competition might be held that data might be competition sensitive. (Note: Why? Having this data would simply allow the competitors to see where they needed to improve)

An unsupported rumor was that the adverse dirty conditions test required 1000 rounds without failure although 800 would be acceptable. A claim was made that none of the firearms achieved even 600 rounds.

As a result of this there were threats of lawsuits by the makers who felt defamed and worse a Congressional investigation.

=== Third tests from 1983-1984 ===
By November 1983, a new program was started, now under the XM9 name. These later trials did not have all of the same pistols competing, as some had dropped out, and some were added to the competition.

This time the Army required 30 handguns and spares for each submitted handgun design. The magazine capacity requirement was changed from 10 to 13. The price was now a fixed price requirement for a procurement of 220,000 pieces. These changed requirements caused the elimination of some handguns which has participated in the first trial.

Eight pistols were entered into the XM9 competition were:

- : Beretta of Italy entered their Beretta 92SB-F (later renamed to 92F), which was an improvement of their previous entry, the Beretta 92S-1. This emerged as the winner of these trials as well, and would be eventually adopted as the Beretta M9.
- (Switzerland) : SIG Sauer (under the name SigArms) introduced their new pistol specifically designed for the trials, the P226. The P226 was the runner-up to the M9, as both were the only two to satisfactorily pass the trials. However, the P226 would ultimately not be chosen. In a later competition for a compact service pistol, SIG Sauer's P228 became the M11 pistol.
- : Steyr of Austria submitted the Steyr GB.
- : FN Herstal of Belgium gave up on the other two designs and submitted again their BDA, a modified double-action version of the Browning Hi-Power.
- : Colt's Manufacturing Company of the United States submitted the Colt SSP (stainless steel pistol).
- : Walther of Germany submitted the Walther P88.
- : Heckler & Koch, also of Germany, gave up on their previous two efforts and entered the P7.
- : Smith & Wesson of the United States submitted their Smith & Wesson 459M.

The third trials commenced in January 1984 with the first tests carried out in following February.

==== Results of the third tests ====
During the dry mud test, the S&W, H&K, and Beretta passed with nearly perfect scores but the SIG only received 79 percent. The Walther failed both the wet and dry mud tests.

Out of the eight submitted entries, only the Beretta 92SB-F and the SIG Sauer P226 were found "technically acceptable finalists". Steyr's GB pistol was the first design to be rejected by Army on May 4, due to reliability issues. Subsequently, both Fabrique Nationale Herstal and Colt Manufacturing Company would voluntarily withdraw their entries, with the former on May 31 and the latter on July 18. On September 18, 1984, the submissions by Carl Walther Waffenfabrik, Heckler & Koch and Smith & Wesson were all terminated. The P88 was terminated for failing drop test, dispersion, corrosion resistance, and adverse conditions requirements. The P7M13 was terminated for failing reliability and corrosion resistance requirements and the 459M for failing service life and firing pin energy requirements.

In both trials where the Beretta 92SB-F and SIG Sauer P226 competed the SIG was either equal or superior to the Beretta in most tests. The purchase price for the Beretta M9 handgun was US$178.50 per unit.

The P226 lost out in the final bidding and the Beretta emerging the winning design once again. On January 14, 1985, the Department of Defense and the Army announced that the five-year contract would be awarded to Beretta, with the Beretta 92SB-F subsequently adopted as the M9 pistol.

== Aftermath ==
Controversy over these trials led to the XM10 trials in spring of 1988. These trials were boycotted by most of the arms manufacturers that submitted their designs in prior trials, with the only entrants being the Beretta 92F, slightly improved Smith & Wesson 459 and Ruger submitting their new P85. Both Ruger and Smith & Wesson designs failed the trial perimeters, resulting in Beretta winning again.

In the 2000s, a new joint service handgun was started, the Joint Combat Pistol, which was the result of a merger of two earlier programs: the U.S. Army's Future Handgun System and United States Special Operations Command's SOF Combat Pistol. However, the Army ultimately pulled out of the competition.

As a result of the Modular Handgun System trials, the SIG Sauer P320 was selected as the new service pistol for the United States Armed Forces, supplanting the M9 pistol. The military designations are M17/M18 for the full size and compact models respectively.

== See also ==
- List of individual weapons of the U.S. armed forces
- Objective Personal Defense Weapon
- Personal defense weapon
- XM17 Modular Handgun System competition
