= FN HP-DA =

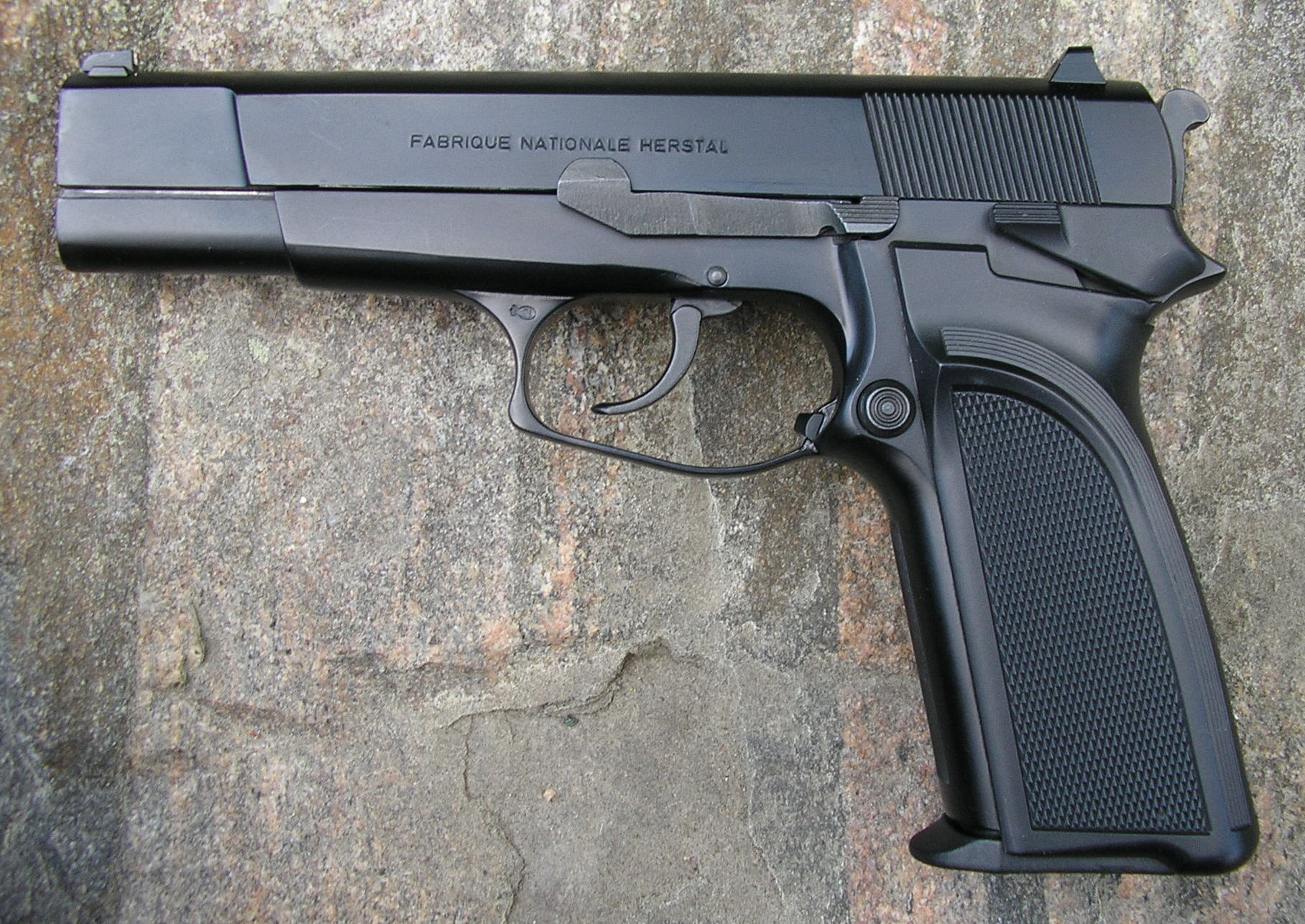
- FN HP-DA (second variation produced 1990–1999)
- Type: Semi-automatic pistol
- Place of origin: Belgium

Service history
- Used by: See Users
- Wars: Lebanese Civil War

Production history
- Designed: 1983
- Manufacturer: FN Herstal
- Produced: 1983–1987 (first version, standard model only); 1990–1999 (updated version and variants)
- Variants: See Variants

Specifications
- Mass: 920 g (32 oz) (BDA, BDAO); 840 g (30 oz) (BDAM); 765 g (27.0 oz) (BDAC)
- Length: 200 mm (7.9 in) (BDA, BDAO); 173 mm (6.8 in) (BDAM, BDAC)
- Barrel length: 118 mm (4.6 in) (BDA, BDAO); 96 mm (3.8 in) (BDAM, BDAC)
- Width: 38 mm (1.5 in) (BDA, BDAO, BDAM); 27 mm (1.1 in) (BDAC)
- Height: 130 mm (5.1 in) (BDA, BDAO, BDAM); 93 mm (3.7 in) (BDAC)
- Cartridge: 9×19mm Parabellum; 9×21mm IMI
- Action: Locked breech, short recoil
- Muzzle velocity: 350 m/s (1,148 ft/s) (BDA, BDAO)
- Feed system: 14-round detachable box magazine 7-round magazine (compact models)
- Sights: Fixed iron sights, front – blade, rear – notch

FN HP-DA (Hi-Power Double Action) is a 9mm semi-automatic pistol developed by Belgian Fabrique Nationale arms factory in Herstal. In North American markets, it was marketed as the Browning BDA (Browning Double Action, also BDA9) and is also referred to as Browning DA and Browning Hi-Power BDA. (Note: Browning Arms Company had marketed other pistols using Browning BDA name. SIG Sauer P220 was sold as BDA45, FN 140DA was BDA380 and FN HP-DA was BDA9.)

Introduced in 1983, it is an update of the Browning Hi-Power (a.k.a. GP 35 in Belgium and French-speaking countries). The overall design layout of all versions of the pistol is based on the Browning Hi-Power, but the firearm features significant ergonomic changes designed to update the weapon to military requirements of its time.

== History ==
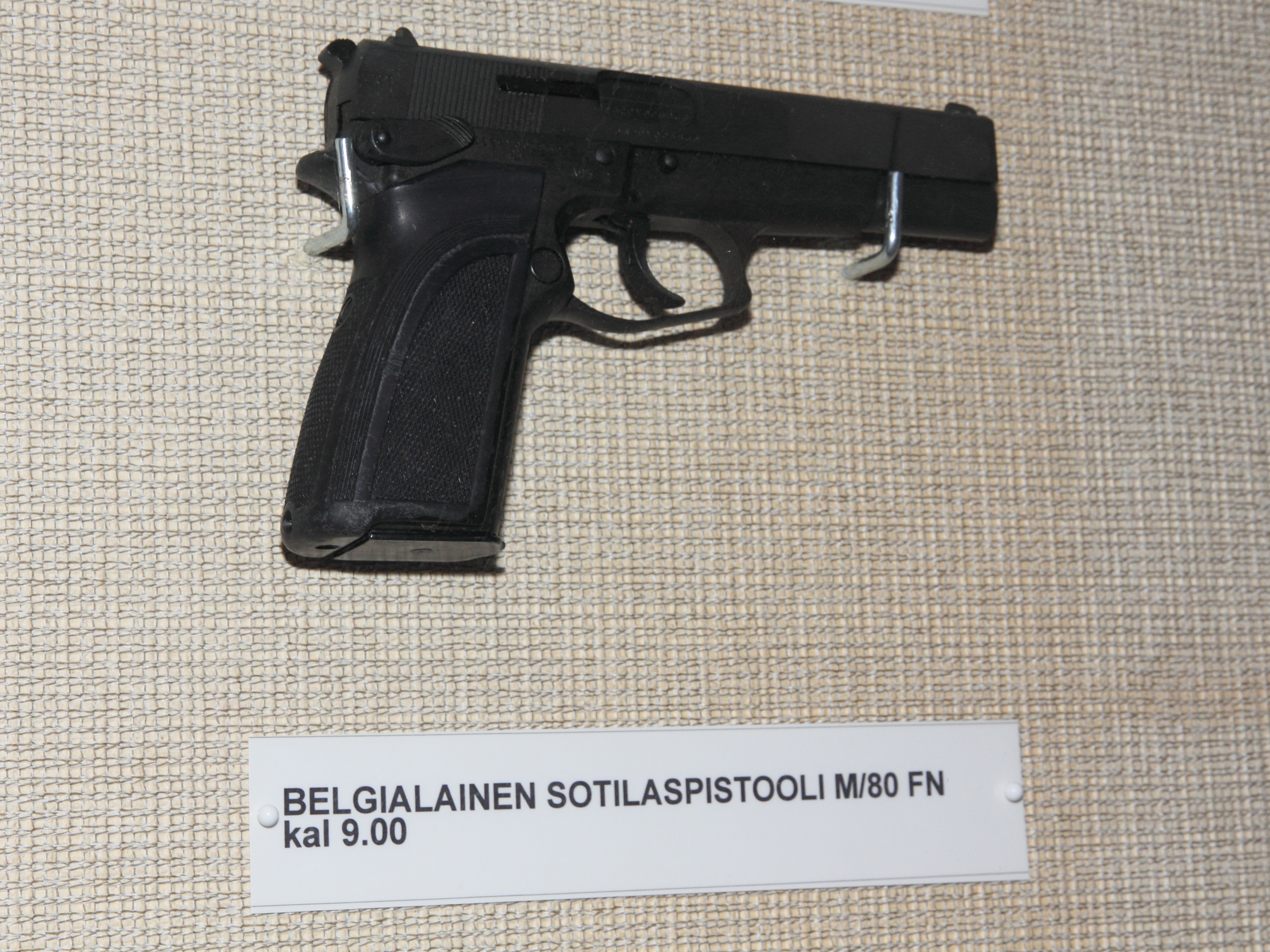
FN HP-DA, first version, displayed at the Imatra Border Museum. The Finnish Defence Forces 900 PIST 80 and 900 PIST 80-91 had decocker levers instead of manual safety lever. The frame safety is different on the updated/1990 model (above page).

The BDA represents the further development of the widely used FN/Browning Hi-Power, which, by the 1980s, had been production for almost fifty years (Note: Browning Hi-Power's production started in 1935. The pistol is also known as P-35 and GP-35, based on its introduction year.) before the design of the BDA was completed. The development of the BDA may have been a response to the original Hi-Power's shortcomings in the first Joint Service Small Arms Program tests conducted in the late 1970s.

FN had the BDA ready for the 1983–1984 XM9 pistol trials to select a new sidearm chambered for the 9×19mm Parabellum cartridge that would equip all branches of the United States Armed Forces. FN Herstal would voluntarily withdraw the BDA from the competition on May 31, 1984. Ultimately, the winner of the bid was the Italian Beretta 92F.

The Finnish Defence Forces accepted the weapon into service as their general service pistol under the designations 9.00 PIST 80 and 9.00 PIST 80–91.

The FN HP-DA/Browning BDA had two versions during its lifetime. The first version featured a frame safety similar to the original Browning Hi-Power. Production of the FN HP-DA started in 1983, but did not sell well and was withdrawn from the markets in 1987.

The production resumed in 1990, with the second/updated version produced with a newer-style frame safety, as well being made with a new manufacturing process. Along with the second version, in 1990, new variations, such as compact (BDAC/HP-DAC) and double-action only (BDAO/HP-DAO) variants, also entered production. Ultimately, the production of the BDA and its variants ceased in 1999. It was succeeded by the FN Forty-Nine in 2000 and then the FN FNP in 2006.

== Design details ==
The FN HP-DA is a semi-automatic short recoil operated locked breech firearm. It has a vertically tilting delayed camming action. This locking mechanism was borrowed from the Browning Hi-Power. The handgun features a double-action trigger which cocks and then releases the hammer. The recoil of the slide recocks the hammer, and all consecutive shots are fired from the single-action mode. A disconnector ensures the pistol fires in semi-automatic mode only. The spring-loaded external claw extractor is mounted in the slide, while the fixed ejector is inside the pistol's frame. The BDA is secured against unintentional firing with an automatic firing pin safety which blocks the firing pin and is released only when the trigger is pulled to fire. Immediately after a round is fired, the safety reengages itself even if the trigger is not released. The BDA also has a decocking safety that safely releases and captures the hammer in a safety notch. A decocking lever is mounted on each side of the pistol's frame.

Compared to the original Browning Hi-Power, one its most notable changes is the shortening of the hammer spur, which would tend to cut into the web between the thumb and fingers of the grip hand if an original Hi-Power was held incautiously.

The HP-DA feeds from a dual-column box magazine with a 14-round cartridge capacity. (The FN HP-DA, however, uses a different 10- or 15-round magazine which is interchangeable with the Browning BDM but will not fit in a Browning BDA-9 though the guns look identical and they are both made by FN Herstal.) The magazine release button, located aft of the trigger, can be configured for either right- or left-hand users simply by swapping out the push-button. The BDA is fitted with a slide catch that holds the slide open after depleting the magazine. The slide can be released by pressing the slide release lever, placed on the left side of the frame. The pistol is aimed using fixed iron sights with contrasting dots – a front blade and dovetailed rear notch. As an option, tritium-illuminated Meprolight night sights can also be fitted.

The HP-DA is chambered for the 9×19mm Parabellum cartridge, but a 9×21mm version is also available for those countries where military calibers (such as the 9×19mm) are prohibited for civilian use.

== Variants ==
Originally, the BDA/HP-DA was produced only as a standard model during its first version in 1983–1987. When the second/updated version was introduced in 1990, FN also introduced new variants of the BDA/HP-DA pistol.

The Browning Hi-Power BDA/FN HP-DA was produced in following variants:

- BDA/HP-DA (initially designated BDA-9S) was the standard model that was also the largest in size. The gun measures 200 × 38 × 130 mm with a barrel length of 118 mm and a weight of 920 grams. The magazine has a capacity of fourteen cartridges. The original 1983–1987 version was produced with a frame safety similar to the Browning Hi-Power, but the updated version from 1990 to 1999 has its more unique-looking frame safety.
- BDAM/HP-DAM (for medium) is the medium model. It measures 173 × 38 × 130 mm with a 96 mm barrel and a weight of 840 grams. The medium has the same magazine as the standard. The BDAM was aimed at the law enforcement market.
- BDAC/HP-DAC (for compact) is the compact variant. The dimensions are 173 × 27 × 93 mm, the barrel measures 96 mm and the DAC weighs 765 grams. The variant has a duo stack magazine of seven cartridges. It was designed for air force personnel. Another compact variant, the BDA-9C had a shorter grip using the magazine (full size in particular to take place) for increased concealment.
- BDAO/HP-DAO (double action only) is a variant that received a different trigger mechanism that cocks and then releases the hammer which is automatically decocked following each shot.
- Model 88 SP is a Chinese clone of the HP-DA, marketed by Norinco.

== Users ==
- Finland: Standard service pistol
- United States: Various police departments.

=== Non-state users ===
- Lebanese Forces

== See also ==
- Browning BDM – BDA's sister pistol
- FN 509 – FN's contribution to the XM17 Modular Handgun System competition, as with BDA with Joint Service Small Arms Program
- FN FNP and FN FNX – BDA's spiritual successors

== Bibliography ==
- (in Finnish) Graham, Smith (ed.): Sotilaskäsiaseet, Jyväskylä, Helsinki: Gummerus, 1996, ISBN 951-20-4750-0
- Ian Hogg and Rob Adam, Jane's Guns Recognition Guide, HarperCollins, 1996, 1st edition, p. 512, ISBN 978-0-00-470979-6
