= Joint Combat Pistol =

Cancelled US program for a new military sidearm

The Joint Combat Pistol was the name for a former US program for a new military sidearm to replace the M9 Pistol, extant from late 2005 to early 2006. The program was started in 2005 and run by USSOCOM. It was the result of a merger of two earlier programs, the army's Future Handgun System (FHS) and the Special Operations Forces Combat Pistol. Requirements for the JCP included being chambered for caliber .45 ACP, having an integrated Picatinny rail, including day/night sights, and being capable of accepting a suppressor.

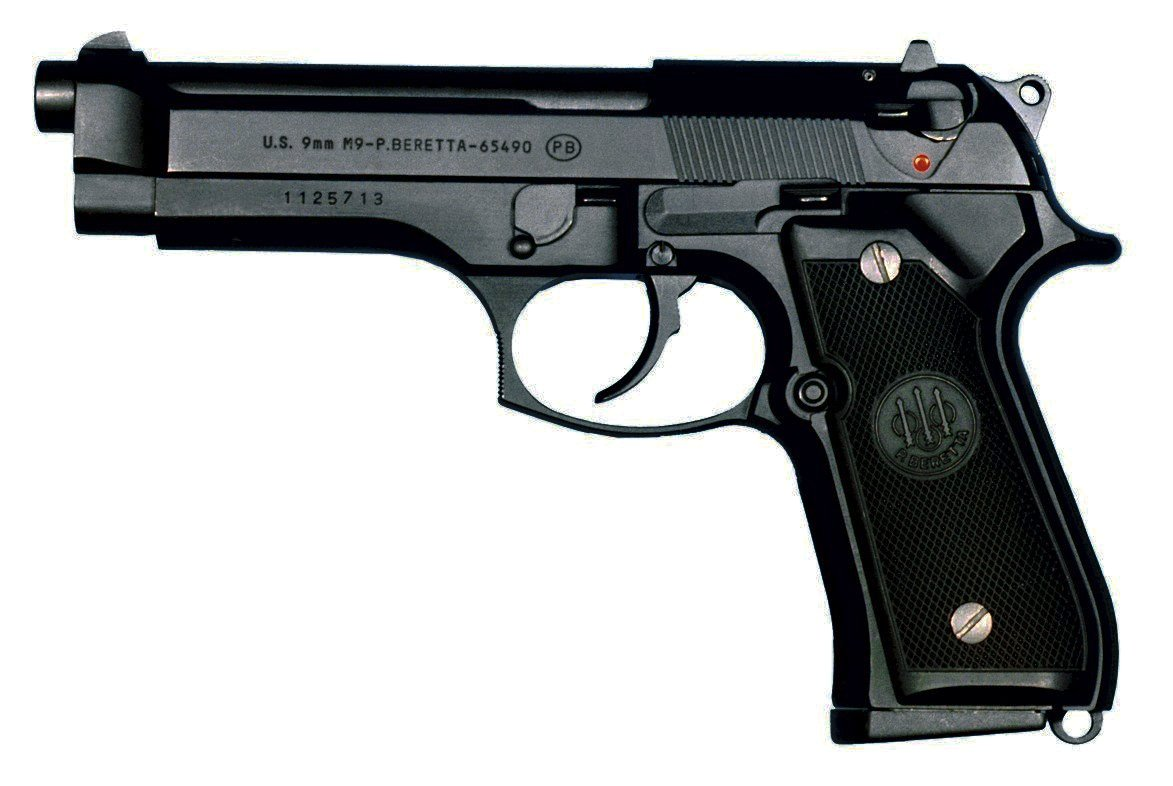
Beretta M9 pistol

On March 10, 2006, a modification to the earlier request was made, changing the name from Joint Combat Pistol to Combat Pistol. The number of pistols sought was reduced from 645,000 handguns to 50,000. This effectively reverted to the SOF Combat Pistol program in terms of its scale, as the army dropped its participation. In the autumn of 2006, the Combat Pistol (CP) program was suspended indefinitely.

In a 2007 supplemental session, the congressional defense sub-committee appropriated $5 million to a Joint Combat Pistol study.

== JCP and CP candidates ==
A large variety of .45 ACP pistols were entered into the competition. These include the:

- Beretta PX4 Storm
- Fabrique Nationale FNP45-USG
- Glock 21SF
- Heckler & Koch HK45C
- Para-Ordnance LDA 1911
- Ruger P345
- SIG P220 Combat
- Smith & Wesson M&P
- HS-45 (sold as the Springfield Armory XD in the United States)
- Taurus PT 24/7 OSS

== See also ==
- Individual Carbine
- List of individual weapons of the U.S. Armed Forces
- XM8 rifle
- XM17 Modular Handgun System competition
