= Browning BDM =

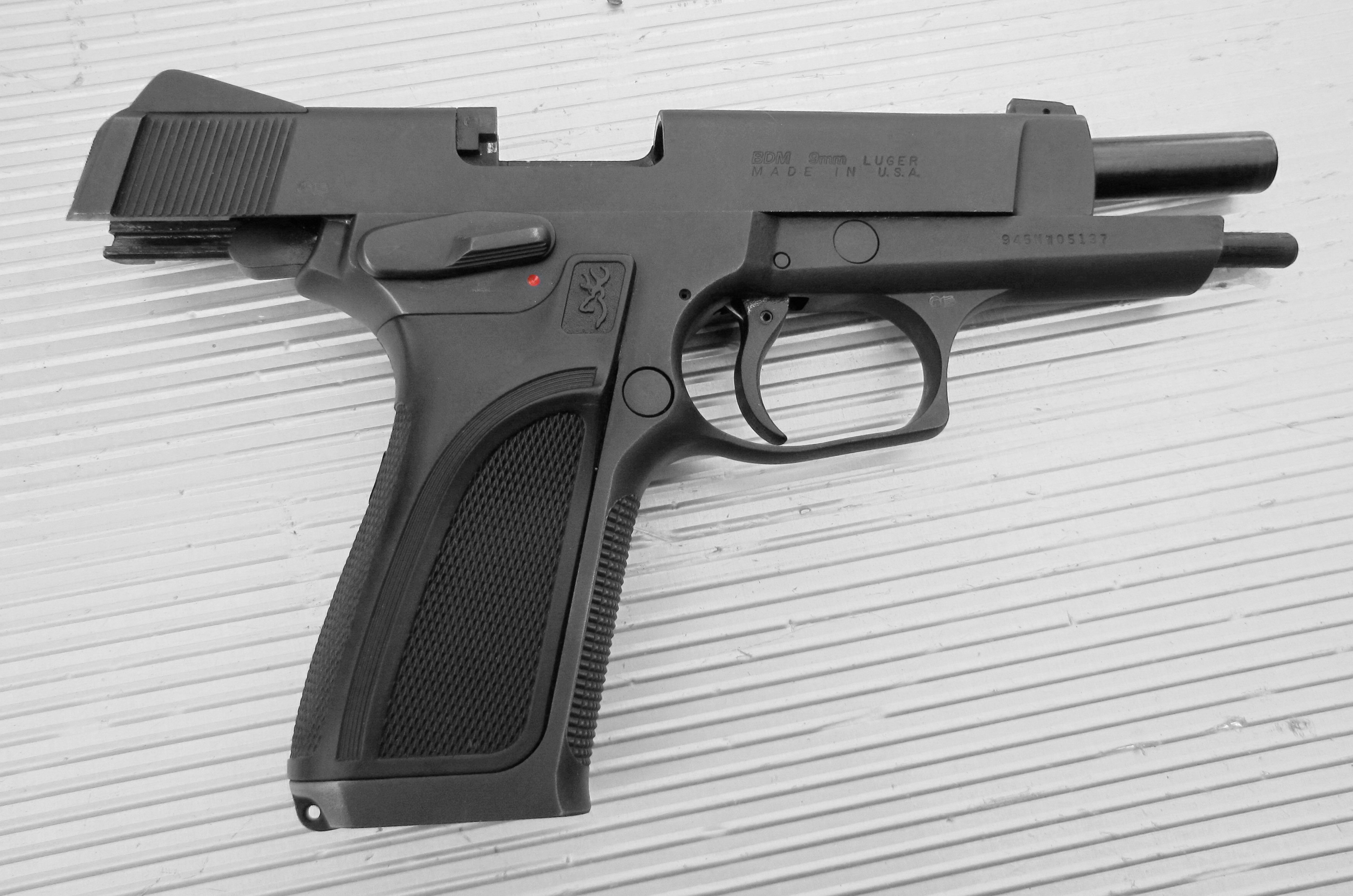
- A Browning BDM with the slide open.
- Type: Semi-automatic pistol
- Place of origin: United States

Service history
- Wars: Lebanese Civil War

Production history
- Designer: Browning Arms Company
- Designed: 1991
- Manufacturer: Browning Arms Company
- Produced: 1991–1998
- Variants: BPM-D and BRM-DAO

Specifications
- Mass: 870 g (31 oz)
- Barrel length: 120 mm/4.7 in
- Cartridge: 9×19mm Parabellum
- Action: Locked breech, short recoil
- Feed system: Detachable 15-round box magazines

The Browning BDM (Browning Double Model) is a semi-automatic pistol designed and manufactured by the Browning Arms Company from 1991 until production ceased in 1998. Similar in appearance to Browning's (FN Herstal's P-35 model) "Hi-Power" pistol, the BDM was actually a new design created to compete in service trials for a proposal as a standard issue pistol for the Federal Bureau of Investigation (FBI).

However, the BDM failed to win any large scale law enforcement contracts, so was instead sold only in the retail market. Having a similar profile to the Browning P-35 Hi-Power, the BDM and its variants are often conflated as mere variants of the much older P-35 model, or other newer Browning or FN Herstal pistols that were updated variants of the P-35, such as the Hi-Power DAO model.

== Design ==
The Browning model BDM and its variants were designed and developed exclusively by the Browning Arms Company attempting to address the trend within North American law enforcement agencies of transitioning from the use of double-action service revolvers to higher-capacity semi-automatic service pistols. The design goal of the BDM pistol was to help experienced law enforcement personnel adjust from the trigger operation characteristics of double-action (DA) revolvers to double action/single action (DA/SA) or double-action-only (DAO) semi-automatic pistols.

During the late 1980s and throughout the 1990s, Browning had several semi-automatic pistols in its catalog which were licensed to Browning but actually manufactured by European firearms companies, such as FN Herstal's P-35 Hi-Power model (Browning model "Hi-Power"), Sig Sauer's P220 model (Browning model "BDA .45 ACP"), and Beretta's Cheetah model (Browning model "BDA .380 ACP"). While these European pistol models had all found use in law enforcement and military units throughout the world, Browning was looking to compete with other pistol manufacturers in the North American market to develop an up-to-date, full-size, semi-automatic service pistol chambered in 9mm Parabellum and having a cartridge capacity of 15 or more rounds housed in box magazines. However, none of Browning's licensed models met these desired specifications, nor the design goal regarding helping operators smoothly transition from using revolvers to semi-automatic pistols.

The Browning Hi-Power model (FN Herstal P-35) was the nearest design within Browning's catalog of the type of handgun that Browning engineers were seeking to develop. The Hi-Power model is a full-size, semi-automatic service pistol chambered in the 9mm Parabellum cartridge, and has a standard magazine capacity of 13 rounds. However, the Hi-Power design has been in service since 1935, and although it has a reputation for very high reliability and was considered to be rugged, in most configurations its service sights were considered small and ill-suited to low-light environments. Plus, the Hi-Power pistol model uses a single-action only (SAO) trigger operation, similar to the Colt 1911 type pistol. Many policy makers in law enforcement regard single-action only handguns as an unacceptable risk and liability of unintentional discharge when a law enforcement official involved in a potentially lethal armed encounter suddenly experiences the almost inevitable adrenaline rush of anticipated or perceived danger. In such a situation, a single-action only trigger mechanism requiring a lighter finger pressure and shorter actuation is considered to lack sufficient inherent resistance to unintentional discharge for typical police use, requiring a higher level of trigger discipline than handguns with a longer and heavier trigger pull, such as double-action (DA) revolvers, which the vast majority of law-enforcement personnel of the 20th century had been trained to operate.

There are relatively few law enforcement agencies that authorize the use of semi-automatic pistols with single-action only (SAO) triggers, due to belief that such pistols are better suited for military use or for operators with a higher level of training and expertise, such as SWAT and hostage rescue teams. During the 1990s, double-action/single action (DA/SA) and double-action-only (DAO) pistols were the types that the majority in law enforcement administration and procurement were looking to purchase and issue to their rank-and-file officers.

Browning Arms Company decided to design, develop, and manufacture their own new pistol model, and any variants, solely in-house in the United States to meet law enforcement criteria of that time.

=== Operation ===
The BDM pistol is a magazine-fed, self-loading, hammer-firing type which was designed with a trigger "mode" switch installed on the left-hand side of the slide (actually only a flush inlaid disk with a bisecting groove), toggling between double-action/single-action (DA/SA) pistol mode, and the double-action-only (DAO) or "revolver" mode—though, of course, other than the similarity of the trigger mode, the BDM has no resemblance to revolvers. This mode switch is what gives the handgun its name, with BDM standing for "Browning Dual Mode" or "Browning Double Mode".

The mode-selector disc could be turned using a tab protruding from the magazine base plate, obviating the need for tools in the field.

=== Variants ===
Variants of the BDM lacked the mode operating switch, and so were either full-time "revolver" mode, such as the model BRM-DAO (Browning Revolver Mode - Double Action Only), or full-time double-action/single-action pistol mode, model BPM-D (Browning Pistol Mode - Decocker). Finishes included blued, matte-chromed (which Browning advertising called "silver chrome"), and a two-toned combination of a silver chromed frame and blued slide, called the "practical" finish.

The BDM and BPM-D variant have an ambidextrous frame-mounted safety/decocker lever, which when operated returns the pistol to the hammer-down, pre-cocked "safe" condition. Unless the hammer is manually pulled rearward into the cocked position, the usual first shot of a series requires only a relatively longer and heavier double-action trigger pull. Each subsequent cartridge can then be fired by a lighter, shorter single-action trigger pull, until the hammer is reset to the down and "safe" position by depressing the safety/decocker lever.

The BRM-DAO variant lacks a safety/decocker lever, returning the hammer to the down and "safe" position after every shot fired. Operating the trigger of the BRM-DAO variant is the same as operating the double-action trigger pull (usually the first round fired of a series) of the BDM and BPM-D models. However, because the hammer of the BRM-DAO model automatically returns to the down and "safe" condition after every shot, the BRM-DAO is a full-time "double-action only" (DAO) pistol. All trigger pulls for the BRM-DAO are essentially consistent.

The BDM and its variants utilize within the pistol's grip a removable box magazine, of the double-stack variety with a capacity of 10 or 15 rounds of 9×19mm Parabellum ammunition cartridges. To comply with the 1994 U.S. Federal Assault Weapons Ban, BDM magazines were limited to 10-round capacity after 1994 for civilian purchasers, although 15-round magazines were available for civilians before this legislation took effect, and 15-round magazines were always available from Browning during the production run for law enforcement users. After the 2004 expiration of the 1994 U.S. Assault Weapons legislation, 15-round magazines again became legal and available in most states for civilian use. Since the Browning BDM and its variants were discontinued, magazines for these pistols have become increasingly rare and expensive, even though magazines were fabricated for a few years from aftermarket firms such as Mec-Gar and Triple K.

The Browning BDM, BPM-D, and BRM-DAO were noted for being among the narrowest full-sized 9×19mm pistols ever manufactured (even more narrow than the Browning or FN Herstal Hi-Power models) which made them easier to conceal and to operate by persons with smaller hands.

=== Manufacturing ===
While FN Herstal pistols were manufactured in Belgium, the Browning BDM and its variants were instead manufactured in Morgan, Utah, and officially sold only by retail firearms dealers through Browning authorized distributors in the United States and Canada. Markings on each of the Browning BDM pistol's slides list Morgan, Utah and Montreal P.Q. (Province de Quebec), because in these cities were located the headquarters offices of Browning Arms Company for each respective country during the production run of the BDM model and its variants.

Although Browning initially offered the BDM and variants to law enforcement agencies, the BDM design failed to win any large government contracts, so the company instead advertised and released the BDM pistols for sale in the civilian retail market beginning in 1991.
