= Ruger P series =

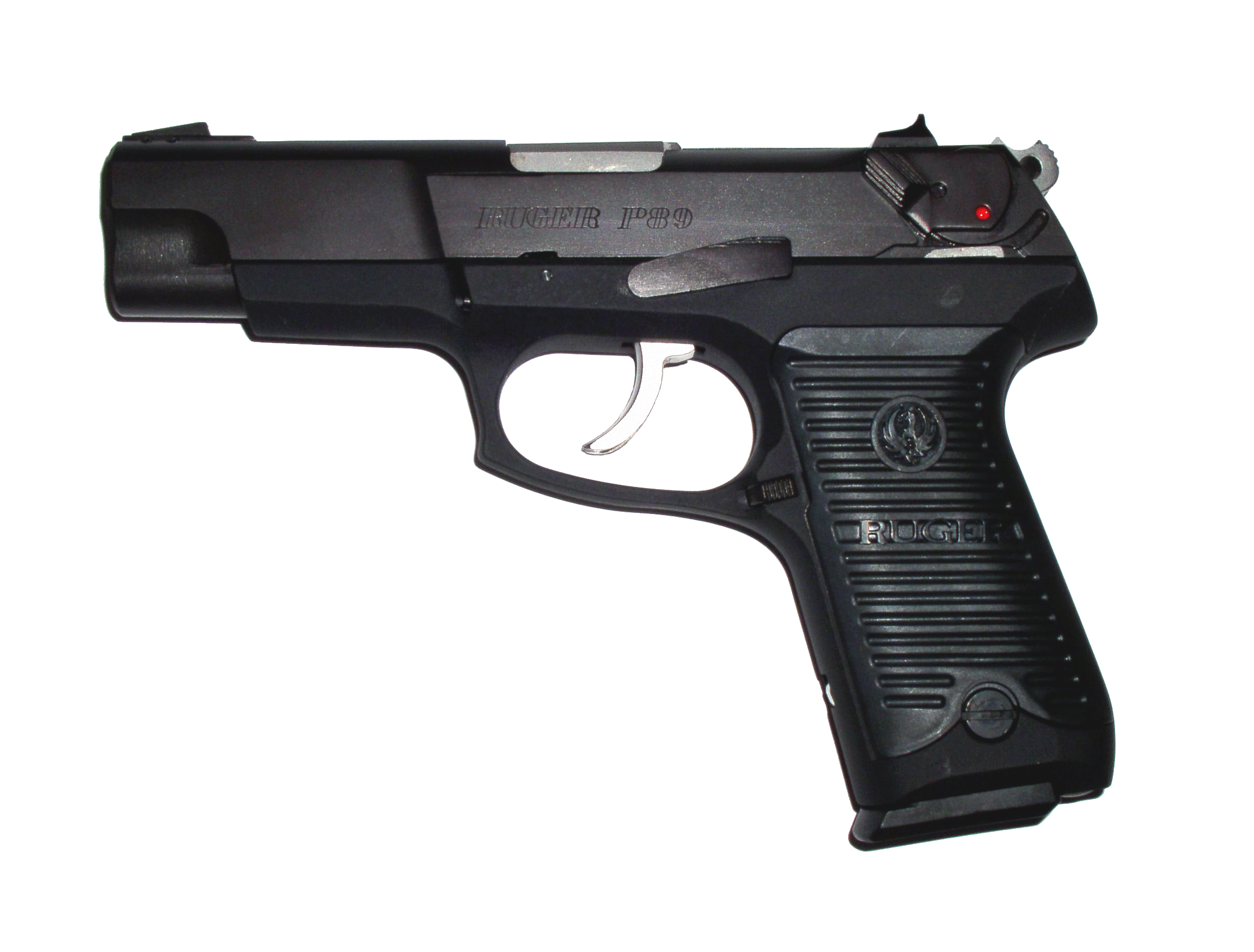
- P89
- Type: Semi-automatic pistol
- Place of origin: United States

Production history
- Designed: 1985 (P85)
- Manufacturer: Sturm, Ruger & Co.
- Produced: 1985–2013
- Variants: See Variants

Specifications
- Mass: 32 oz (910 g) (P89)
- Length: 7.75 in (197 mm) (P89)
- Barrel length: 4.50 in (114 mm) (P89)
- Cartridge: 7.65×21 mm Parabellum (P89); 9×19 mm Parabellum (P85/P85 MKII, P89, P93, P94, P95); .40 S&W (P91, P94); .45 ACP (P90, P97, P345)
- Action: Short recoil
- Effective firing range: 55 yd (50 m)
- Feed system: Detachable box magazine: 9×19mm Parabellum: 15+1; .40 S&W: 10+1 or 11+1; .45 ACP: 7+1 or 8+1
- Sights: 3-dot sight

The Ruger P series is a line of centerfire semi-automatic pistols made by Sturm, Ruger & Company produced from 1985 to 2013. The P-series pistols were designed for military, police, civilian and recreational use. The designs are largely based on the Browning action found in the M1911 pistol, but with minor variations, generally related to the safety mechanism and the barrel-camblock interface. Reviews have considered them rugged, reliable, and strong, though this strength comes at the price of bulk and a blocky appearance.

== Design details ==
The P-series pistols are short recoil–operated, locked breech semi-automatic pistols. They use a SIG P220 type locking system, and an M1911-style tilting barrel. The P series were made with a traditional double-action/single-action (DA/SA), or double-action-only (DAO) trigger mechanism.

The standard models have an ambidextrous manual safety/decocker located on the slide; when the safety lever is lowered to the safe position, the firing pin is cammed into the slide away from the hammer, the trigger is disconnected from the sear, and the hammer is decocked. The decocker models have no manual safety; instead, when the lever is lowered, it only cams the firing pin into the slide and drops the hammer. When the lever is released, the firing pin springs back to the normal position. The DAO models have no manual safety or decocker. All models feature an automatic firing pin safety that blocks the firing pin unless the trigger is pulled fully rearward.

The pistols make extensive use of investment-cast parts and proprietary Ruger alloys. Nearly all internal parts, including the barrel, are stainless steel, while the slide and ejector are carbon steel. The P85 through P944 use an investment-cast aluminum frame, while the P95 and later models use a fiberglass-reinforced polyurethane frame.

The 9mm and .40 S&W versions use double-column box magazines; the 9mm has a 15-round capacity, and the .40 S&W has a 10-round or 11-round capacity, the latter being restricted to Law Enforcement use after the Clinton Assault Weapons Ban, that limited magazine capacity to a maximum of 10 rounds. The .45 ACP versions use single-column magazines holding seven or eight rounds (depending on the model). All P-series pistols of the same caliber use a similar magazine design, but slight modifications have been made to at least the 9mm guns so that not all P-series magazines will function in all P-series frames. Ruger did not keep track of the magazine models so an older magazine may not secure in a newer frame. The Ruger police carbine also uses P-series magazines. The P-series pistols have an ambidextrous magazine release located behind the trigger guard; it can be pushed forward from either side to eject the magazine.

The early-model P95s have fixed, three-dot sights; newer P95s, P97s, and P345s have three-dot sights adjustable for windage.

== Service ==
The P85 was originally developed as a replacement alternative for the U.S. Military's 1984 Joint Service Small Arms Program, a venture to replace the aging M1911A1 to a higher-capacity, NATO-compliant weapon. The P85 met all of the military's requirements, including a 20,000-round life expectancy. Despite this, the P85 was not completed in time for the first two trials. It was, however, able to compete in the later XM10 trials in 1988, for which Ruger supplied 30 P85s to the Aberdeen Proving Ground in Maryland. Despite performing well, the Beretta M9, which had succeeded at winning the previous two competitions, won once again and was awarded the contract.

The P85 did find success with some police departments and civilians, as its rugged design and military qualities did see it adopted by the San Diego Police Department and the Wisconsin State Patrol. Both P85s and P89s were approved for carry by the Chicago Police Department. The P85 was also adopted by the Turkish National Police. In 2004, the US Army awarded Ruger a contract for 5,000 KP95D pistols to be delivered to the Army Tank-automotive and Armaments Command, which issued them to Iraqi Army and Police units.

== Variants ==
=== P85/P85 MKII ===
The P85 was developed in 1985, but was not available until 1987. It was only available with a DA/SA trigger, decocker, and a manual safety. The P85 was affordable, initially retailing for just $295, about $100 cheaper than its nearest competitors.

The P85 is a full-sized DA/SA alloy-framed service pistol originally designed to compete in the 1984 U.S. military pistol trials. Unfortunately the design wasn't finalized until after the trials. The P85 found popularity on the civilian and law enforcement markets but many were recalled after one incident with the firing pin, resulting in a discharge. If the firing pin broke in front of the firing pin block, applying the safety, which dropped the hammer, could transfer enough energy to the broken firing pin to cause a discharge. The P85 was recalled, and a new safety was installed that prevented contact between firing pin and hammer during a decocking operation. This modification was done free of charge. This updated P85 was christened as the P85 MK II in 1989. Other updates included larger safety levers and improved accuracy. The P85 MK II was produced for several more years, until 1992. By then the P89 was in production (having been introduced the previous year), which is essentially just a re-branded P85 MK II. After the P89 was introduced, there was no longer a need to produce the P85 and it was discontinued. Both variants are chambered in 9mm and have a magazine capacity of 15+1 rounds.

=== P89 ===
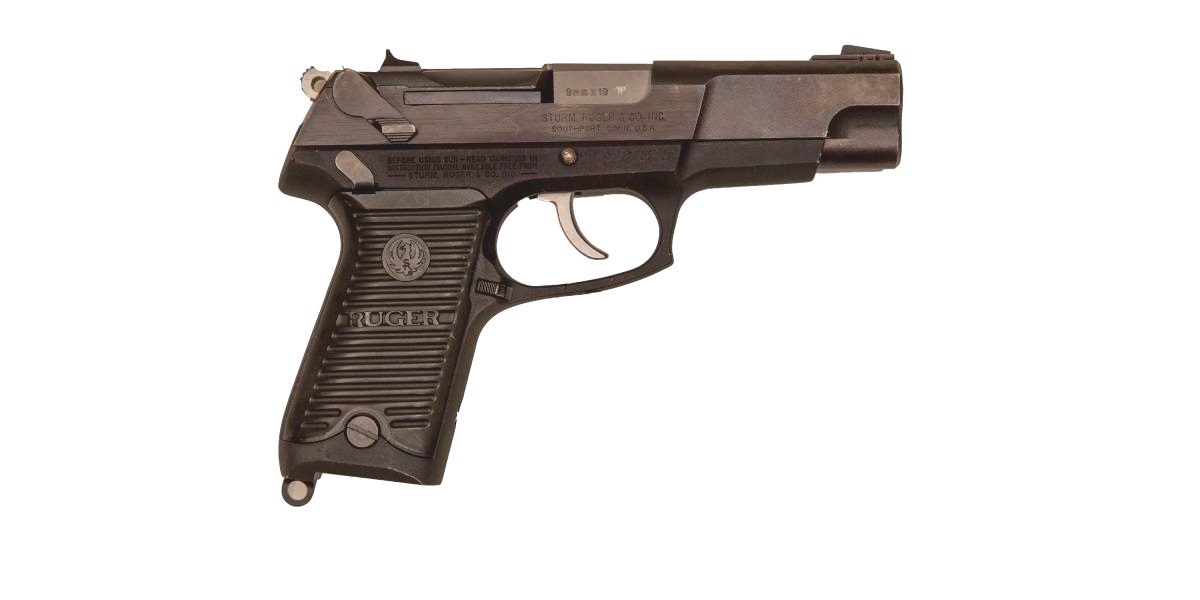
Blued P89

The P89 is an upgraded P85 MKII that introduced new features, including a DAO model. Like the P85, all P89s came with an investment cast aluminum alloy frame. In 1992, Ruger produced a limited-run P89X convertible model, which came with a second barrel and recoil spring assembly that allowed conversion between 9mm and .30 Luger calibers. Ruger only made 5,750 with both barrels in 1994 only. The P89 was one of the most popular and plentiful P-series models. It was discontinued in late 2009. It was chambered in 9mm, with a magazine capacity of 15+1 rounds.

=== P90 ===
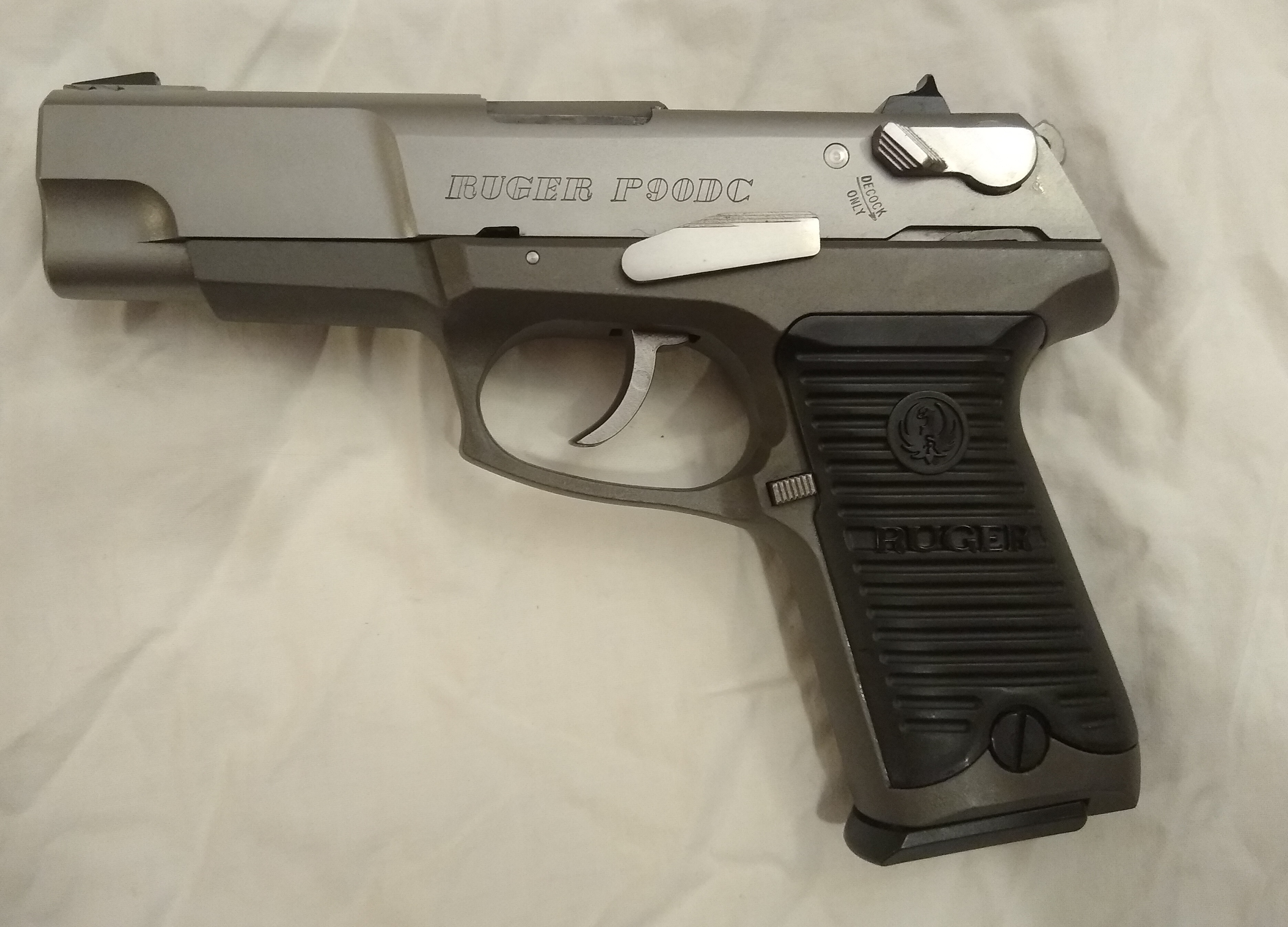
KP90DC (decocker)

The P90 is a scaled-up version of the P89 chambered in .45 ACP with an investment cast aluminum alloy frame. It was introduced in 1991 as the company's first attempt at a .45 ACP pistol, and was in direct competition with SIG Sauer's P220, Smith & Wesson's 4500 series, and to a lesser extent Glock's G21 that came out the same year. The P90 is considered to have above-average accuracy for its price. The P90 was produced until 2010. It has a magazine capacity of 8 rounds.

=== P91 ===
The P91 is essentially a P89 chambered in .40 Smith & Wesson. Like its precursors, it also had an investment cast aluminum alloy frame. It was only produced for two years, from 1992 to 1994. It has a magazine capacity of 11 rounds, with 10 round magazines being developed for the 1994 ban.

=== P93 ===
The P93 was developed in 1993 but not released until 1994. The P93 was designed as a compact version of the P89 and, as such, still had the investment cast aluminum alloy frame, though the frame was slimmer than that of the P89 and it omitted some unnecessary parts. It was designed for shooters interested in lighter weight or easier concealability. The P93 lacks the flared nosepiece of the P89 and also features different grips with heavier checkering. Standard capacity was either 15 or 10 rounds. The P93 has a 3.9-inch (99.1 mm) barrel that utilized a dropping link like the P89. A larger number of P93s than other variants were also double action-only without an external safety, due to its intended concealed carry market. The P93 was discontinued in 2004.

=== P94 ===
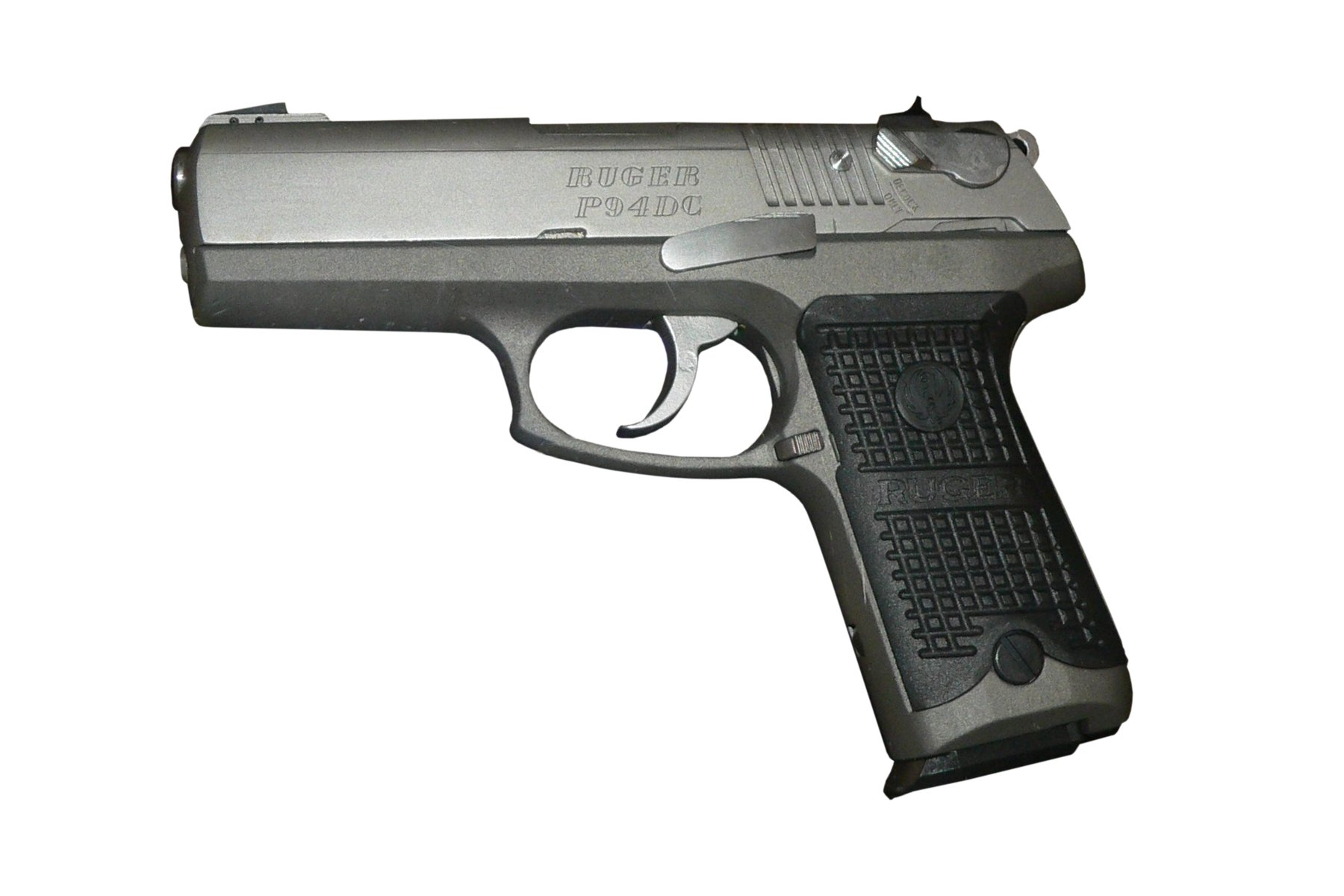
KP94DC, decock-only model

The P94 is a full size. The P94 has a 4.3-inch (109.2 mm) long barrel as opposed to a 3.9-inch (99.1 mm) barrel and still has the investment cast aluminum alloy frame. Like the previous models, the P94 was introduced in 1996. The P94 features different grips with heavier checkering. The P94 has a full-length "streamlined" slide configuration and is chambered in 9mm,and .40 S&W. The P94 was discontinued in 2011 as was the p944.

It can be chambered in either 9mm or .40 S&W, with magazine capacities of 15+1 or 11+1 later on 10+1, respectively.

=== P95 ===
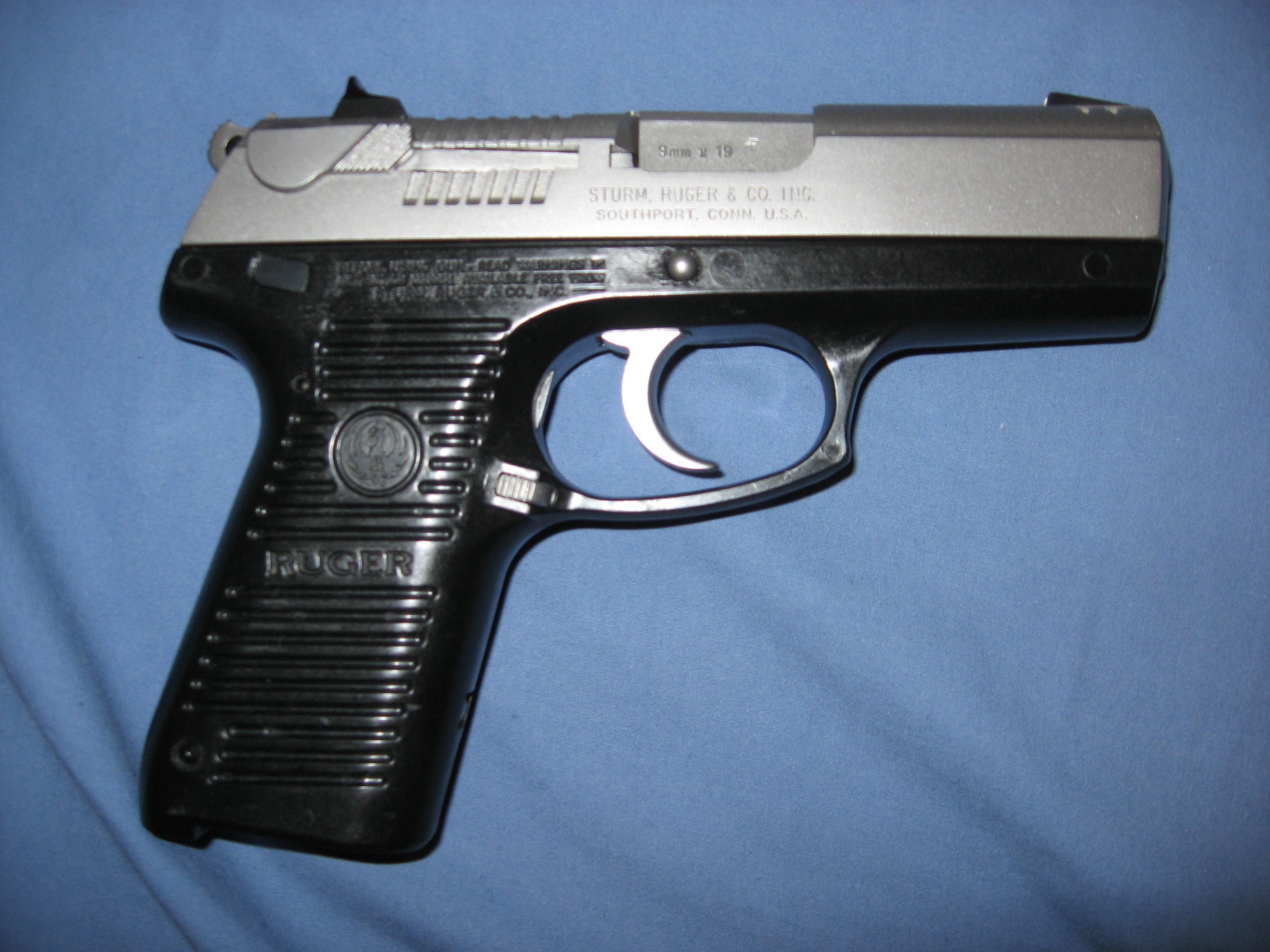
Original model KP95, without the Picatinny rail

Introduced in 1996, the P95 incorporated changes from earlier P-series pistols, including a shorter 3.9-inch (99.1 mm) barrel like the P93. The big change was switching the frame construction from an investment cast aluminum alloy to a new high-impact polymer frame made of fiberglass-reinforced polyurethane, based on Dow Chemical's "Isoplast". The P95 was also the first pistol in the series to omit the dropping link underneath the barrel. The first P95s came with a glossy black polymer frame with a hooked trigger guard and lacking an accessory rail and grip texture.

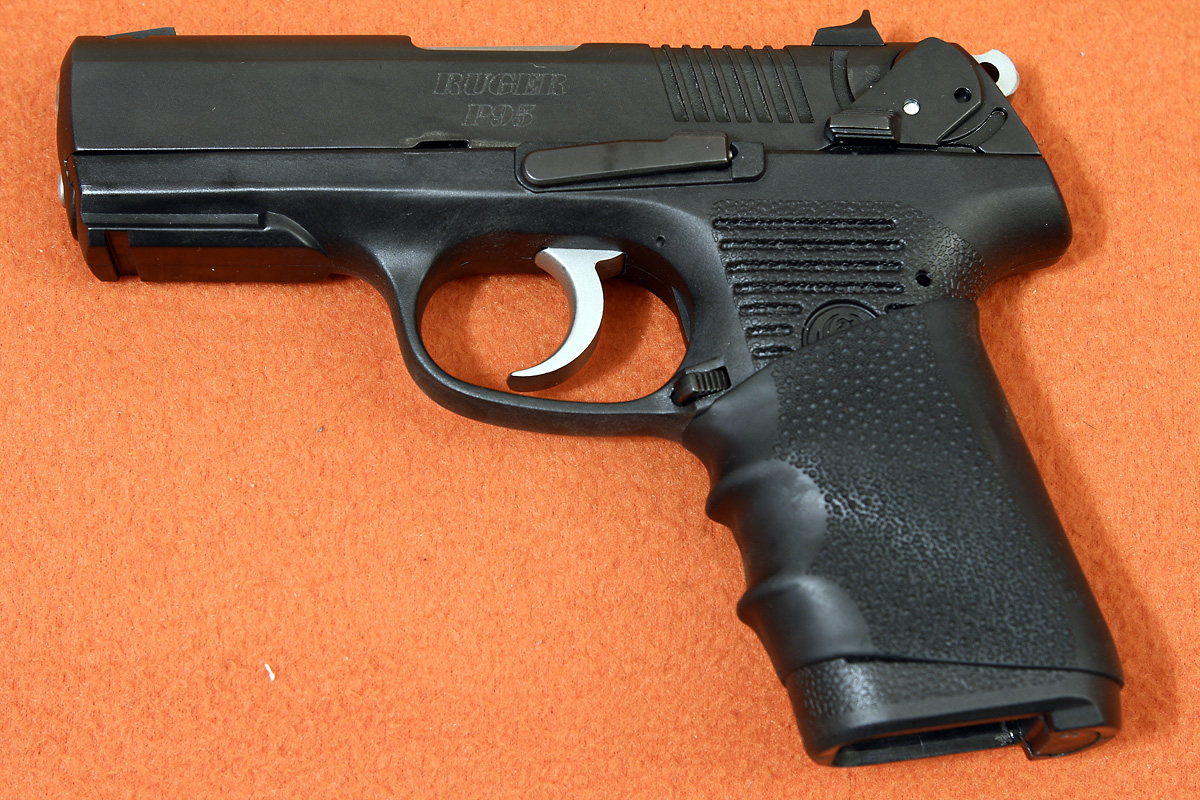
Late model P95PR with Picatinny rail and a Hogue Handall grip installed

Later model P95s featured a matte polymer frame with enhanced grip texturing, an accessory rail and a round trigger guard. The P95 was one of the last in the series to be fully discontinued. Most P95 designs were discontinued in 2004 and 2005, but certain types of the P95 were produced until 2009 and 2013. It is chambered in 9mm with a magazine capacity of 15+1 rounds.

=== P97 ===
The P97 is essentially a P95 chambered in .45 ACP, similar to the P90. The P97 feeds from a single-stack 8+1 .45 ACP magazine, the same magazine used in the P90. It was only available in decocker only and double-action only versions. It featured an adjustable rear sight and retained the same glass-filled polymer frame of the P95. The front sight is pinned in, and the rear held in by a set screw. Unlike the P95, however, the P97 never got the improved frame with added grip texture and an accessory rail and retained the original smooth frame. The P97 was manufactured from 1999 to 2004.

=== P345 ===
The P345, released in 2004, is a transition model between the P series and the SR series. The P345 is chambered in .45 ACP and accepts the same 8+1 single stack magazines as the P90 and the P97. The P345 features a radically different design (as it was intended to usher in Ruger's new pistol designs) and incorporates an integrated keyed lock that locks the safety in the safe position, a loaded chamber indicator, and a magazine disconnect that blocks the firing pin when the magazine is removed. It also has many ergonomic improvements, such as a new polymer frame design (narrower than the double column derived P95 and P97) and low-profile safety levers. It does not feature an ambidextrous slide release or magazine release. Both controls are designed for a right-handed shooter. The model P345PR adds a Picatinny rail to the frame, for mounting lights and other accessories. It was designed to be legal for sale in states that require elaborate safety measures. The P345 was discontinued in 2013 and replaced by the new SR45.

== Users ==
- United States
  - San Diego Police Department: P89
  - Federal Bureau of Prisons: KP89 DAO
  - Wisconsin State Patrol
  - Chicago Police Department: P85 and P89
  - Shelbyville Police Department: P94
- Iraq: Security Forces: P95
- Turkey: Turkish National Police: P85

== Gallery ==
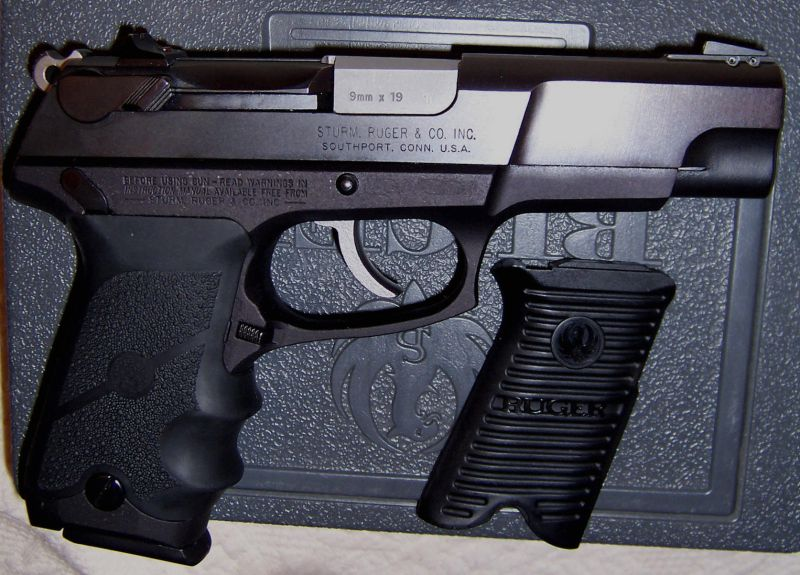
P89 with both the original and Hogue grips installed

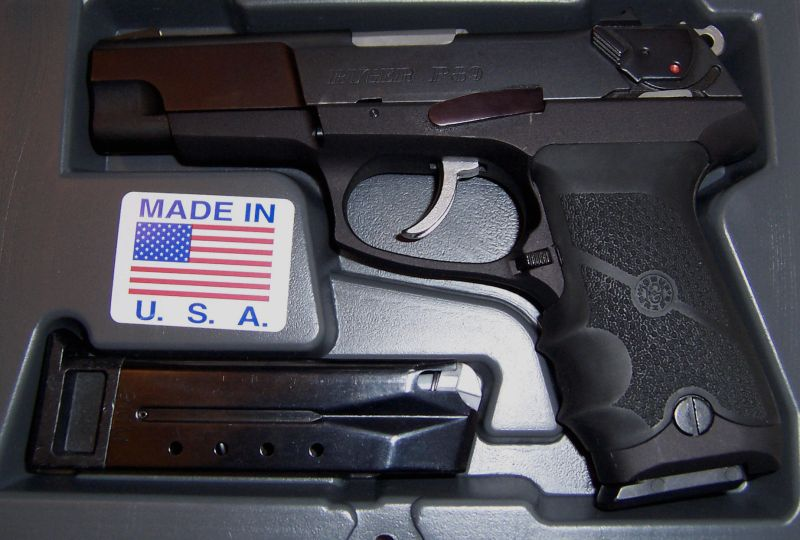
P89 in original case

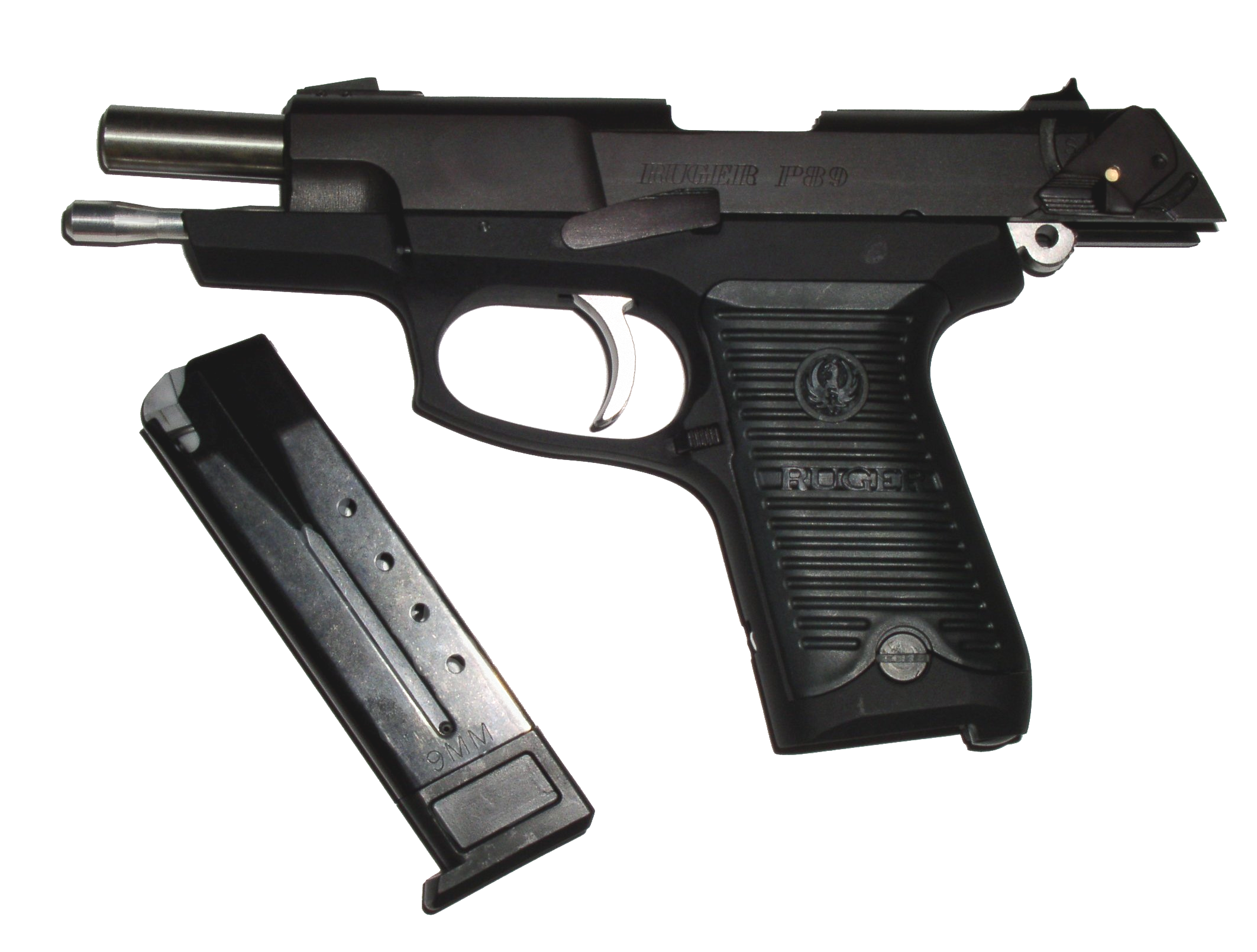
P89 with slide locked back and magazine removed

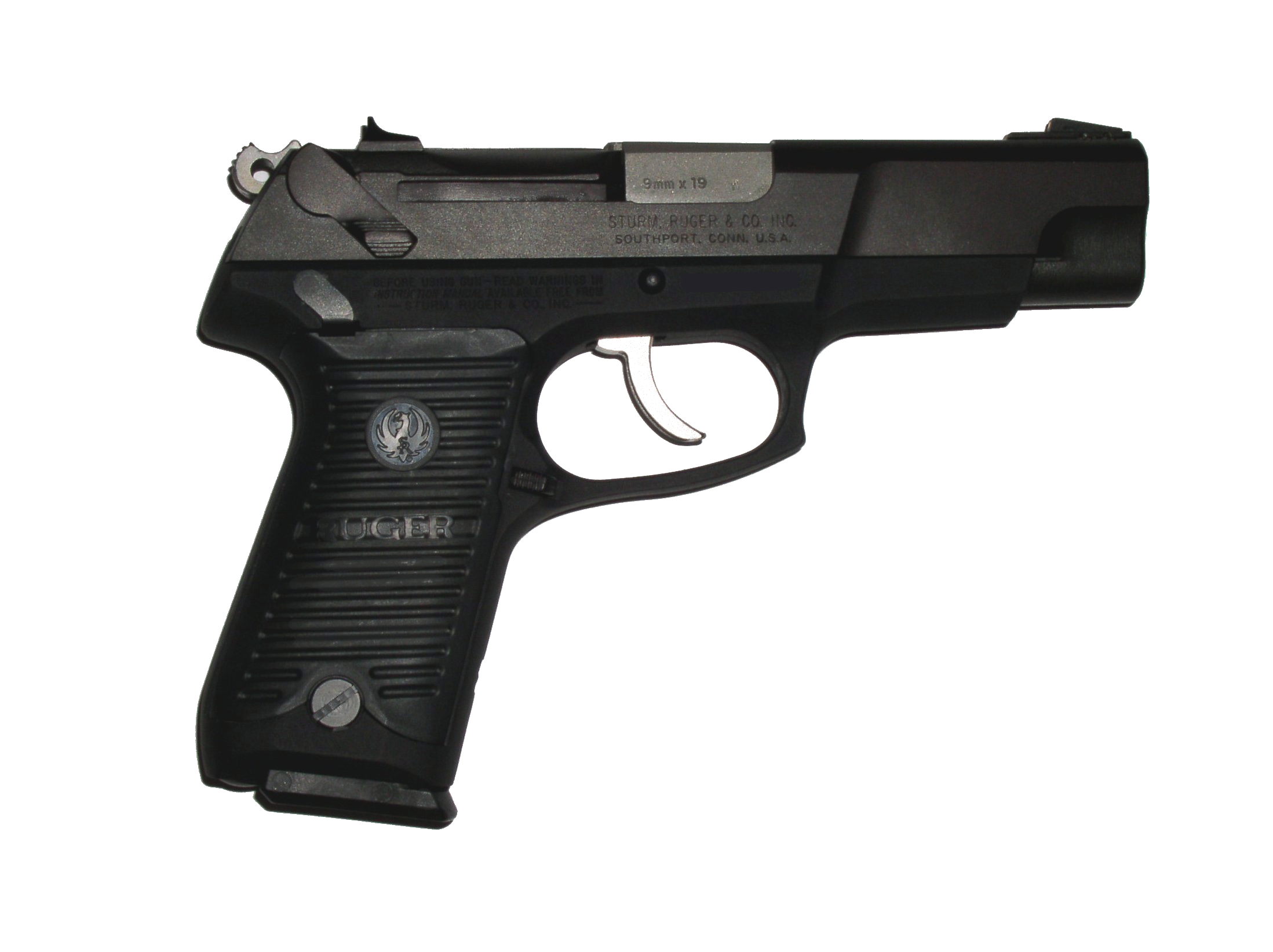
P89 right side view
