= XM17 Modular Handgun System competition =

2015-2017 US Army and US Air Force competition for a new service pistol

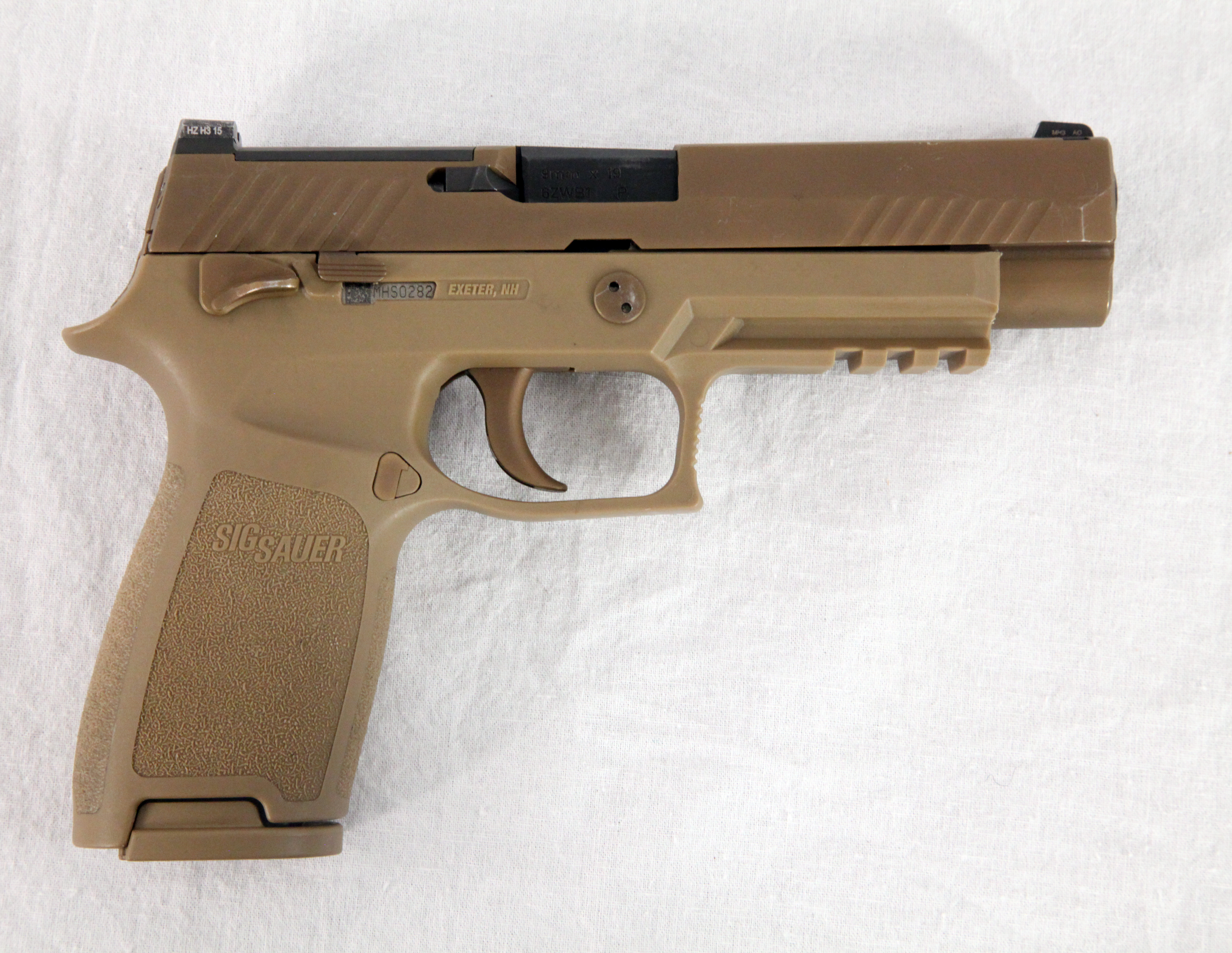
XM17-XM18 Modular Handgun, a pistol built out of SIG Sauer P320.

Glock 19X proposed by Glock Ges.m.b.H.

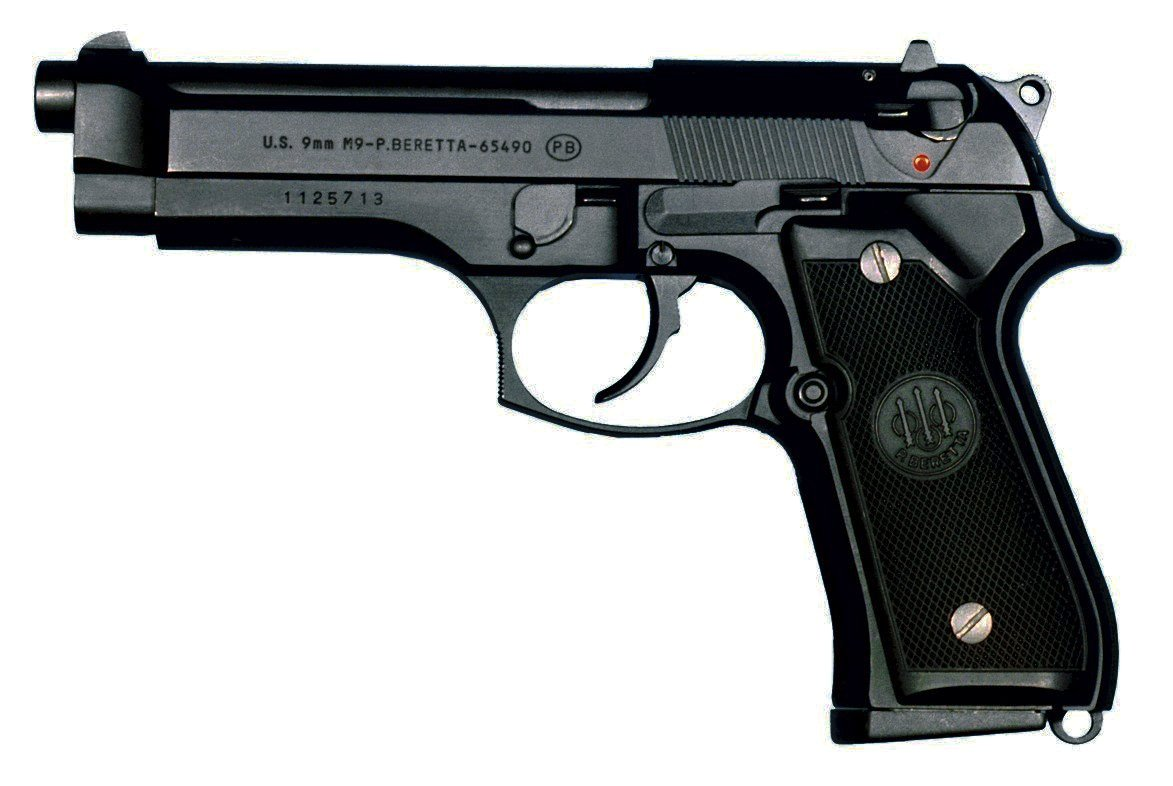
Beretta M9 service pistol, the incumbent model

The XM17 Modular Handgun System (MHS) competition was a United States Army and United States Air Force competition for a new service pistol. The Modular Handgun System was solicited by a Request for Proposals in September 2015 and is anticipated to be the next U.S. military standard side arm replacing the Beretta M9 and the SIG Sauer M11. The U.S. Marine Corps also participated in the program to have input on source selection.

The competition was first announced in 2011, but multiple delays pushed the solicitation deadline to February 2016. SIG Sauer's entry was declared the winner on January 19, 2017, with plans to begin fielding before the end of that year.

The XM17 and XM18 versions of the SIG Sauer P320 were chosen for the full size and compact pistol versions. After acceptance into service, the handguns got the designations M17 and M18, respectively. They are configurable to receive suppressors and even though the 9mm was chosen, they can be adapted to fire .357 SIG or .40 S&W which are supported by the platform. All weapons are planned to be delivered in a period of 10 years.

== Rationale ==
The main reason for the program is the same as the Colt M1911A1 replacement by the Beretta M9 previously: the pistols were at the end of their service life and wearing out. All firearms have a finite life cycle. While parts such as the barrel, grips, springs, pins, and others can be replaced, the frame cannot and eventually becomes unserviceable. The M9, in service since the late 1980s following the Joint Service Small Arms Program, is approaching this limit. Examples in service are showing signs of terminal wear, and rather than replacing them with newly built M9s, the Army decided to opt for a new weapon to address design weaknesses. Special Forces use pistols more often and reach the end of the M9's service life relatively quickly, and regular troops are also reaching their handguns' lifecycle end through sheer age. Special operators have opted for other side arms like the SIG Sauer P226 and P228 (Navy SEALs), the Glock 19 (Army Rangers), or modernized variants of the M1911 (Delta Force and Force Recon). Conventional soldiers have problems with M9 features, or perceived lack thereof, including no accessory rail or suppressor attachment, an ergonomically poor grip, a heavy trigger pull, poor safety selector placement, and an open slide that lets in debris and can cause a malfunction.

== Requirements ==
The U.S. Army initially required the MHS to be more effective, accurate, and reliable than the M9 pistol. The MHS requirement called for a non-caliber specific weapon with modular features to allow for the adaption of different fire control devices, pistol grips, and alternate magazine options. The weapon will fit various hand sizes and will mount targeting enablers using Picatinny rails. The new weapon will incorporate detection avoidance by having a non-reflective neutral color and will be operable with a suppressor in place.

In January 2013, the Army released a Request for Information (RFI) to assess available handgun technologies and U.S. small arms industrial production capacity for the Modular Handgun System. The announcement seeks information "on potential improvements in handgun performance in the areas of accuracy and dispersion out to 50 meters, terminal performance, modularity, reliability, and durability in all environments." The handgun should have a 90 percent or more chance of hitting in a 4-inch circle out to 50 meters consistently throughout the weapon's lifetime. Ergonomic design should minimize recoil energies and control shot dispersion. Features include, but are not limited to, compatibility with accessory items to include tactical lights, lasers, and sound suppressors. Full ambidextrous controls are required and there was interest in ergonomic designs that could be controlled by female shooters.

There was no specific caliber, but terminal ballistics at 50 meters through 35.56 cm (14 inches) of ballistics gel will assess lethality compared to M882 9mm FMJ rounds. Specific interest was given to pistols that can accommodate higher chamber pressures over 20 percent greater than Sporting Arms and Ammunition Manufacturers' Institute (SAAMI) specification for the cartridge without degradation of reliability. The RFI calls for 2,000 mean rounds between stoppages, 10,000 mean rounds between failures, and a 35,000 round service life. Manufacturers are asked to provide production capacity estimates on minimum and maximum monthly rates, as well as the lead times to achieve those rates. Estimated pricing was requested for quantities of 250,000 to 550,000 handguns, in the end the US Army procured 233,429 handguns.

== Development ==
The requirement for the new pistol originated with the MHS program initiated by the Air Force in 2008. It has received Joint Requirements Oversight Council (JROC) validation. The MHS program was to select a Commercial Off-The-Shelf (COTS) handgun in fiscal year (FY) 2011–2012. Testing was to be completed by FY2013 and type classification was expected in FY2014.

Testing and evaluation of replacement pistols were expected to begin in early 2014. The new pistol will also be carried by more soldiers, namely squad and team leaders. A three-year test and evaluation aimed to determine if a COTS contender can replace all 239,000 M9s, as well as the concealable M11. The program was in conjunction with the Air Force. The House Armed Services Committee was pushing to upgrade the M9 rather than pursue a new program. Project officers believed buying a new pistol would be cheaper than improving and maintaining the M9 and offered designs that outperform it. The three-year Engineering, Manufacturing and Development (EMD) phase aimed to test a variety of capabilities including accuracy, dispersion, compatibility, and corrosion resistance. Pistols were to be tested in extreme weather and extreme combat conditions. A Request for Proposals (RFP) was expected to be issued in January 2014. The Army plans to buy 265,000 new pistols.

The Army held an industry day for the MHS on 29 July 2014. The program looked to replace the entire handgun system, which includes the gun, ammo, holster, and some other parts. Owing to the poor reception of the 9mm NATO cartridge in combat zones like Iraq and Afghanistan, the program was an open-caliber competition to evaluate larger rounds like the .40 S&W and .45 ACP or more powerful rounds like the .357 SIG or FN 5.7×28mm. Although the objective was for a round with better terminal ballistics, the argument for adopting a larger bullet has disadvantages.

The Federal Bureau of Investigation and certain police forces have reversed earlier decisions to replace their 9mm pistols with ones chambered for .40 S&W because the heavier bullet and greater recoil caused excessive wear and frame damage. Law enforcement personnel have found that even marginally larger pistol rounds are still too underpowered to stop a person with one shot, and that smaller rounds allow for better shot placement when firing rapidly. Beretta has submitted changes and product improvements to the M9 system, like the M9A1 accepted by the U.S. Marine Corps in 2006, but the Army has maintained that the M9 system does not meet their MHS requirements.

The MHS competition was planned to be launched in January 2015 with the release of a final solicitation. Some 280,000 standard pistols will be ordered, as well as 7,000 compact versions, with deliveries to begin in 2017. Other military services participating in the program may order an additional 212,000 systems. Previously held industry days allowed interested companies to suggest ways and ideas that the Army can improve the plan and process, some of which were adopted into the program. Test firings in simulated combat scenarios will be performed by over 550 military personnel from all services to provide feedback on the performance of each candidate system.

In December 2014, Beretta announced the M9A3, which was submitted via an Engineering Change Proposal (ECP) in accordance with the terms of the current M9 contract. A modified version of the existing M9A1, the new model features a thinner grip, MIL-STD-1913 accessory rail, removable tritium sights, threaded barrel, and a sand-resistant 17-round magazine, produced in a dark earth tone color. Beretta claims likely cost savings over the standard M9 model and meeting almost all of the enhanced handgun requirements. Later that month, the Army decided not to evaluate the M9A3 in favor of pursuing the MHS program, without asking any questions about the upgraded pistol or requesting a sample. Army weapons officials maintain that the M9 design does not meet requirements and a cost-benefit analysis determined the old fleet would cost more to replace and repair than buying a new service pistol. Beretta claims M9A3 upgrade features fix most of the complaints and could be sold for less than the cost of previous M9 versions; the company has suggested a dual-path strategy to evaluate commercially available options while simultaneously evaluating improvements.

=== Request for proposal ===
The Army delayed the MHS RFP until after January 2015 "to allow for improvements to the RFP as a result of feedback received from Industry;" the second draft solicitation for the XM17 was released on 8 June 2015 following the Defense Department's decision to allow use of special purpose ammunition. Testing of three versions was planned to be conducted through 2017. Full-Rate Production would begin in 2018, with 280,000 standard pistols M17 for the Army (replacing the Beretta M9), 212,000 for other services, and 7,000 compact M18 versions for soldiers (replacing the SIG Sauer M11). In a departure from an over one century old battlefield practice, a legal review from the Pentagon has allowed the Army to consider expanding and fragmenting ammunition, such as hollow-point bullets, for the XM17. Though not a signatory to the 1899 Hague Convention that barred bullets with exposed lead tips, or expanding rounds on the battlefield, the U.S. has generally observed the agreement, although it has reserved the right to use the bullet type "where it saw a need," such as United States Army Criminal Investigation Command, Military Police, and Special Forces. The Army claims expanding use to regular troops supports the international law principles of preventing excessive collateral effects, since expanding bullets transfer most of their energy into a target and usually do not pass through a body, and that legal standards have changed since the convention in an era of asymmetric warfare. Some complaints about the M9 involve its 9mm full metal jacket (FMJ) round having insufficient stopping power, so a move to expanding bullets could allow more lethality without switching to a different caliber.

Army Contracting Command released the official MHS RFP on 28 August 2015. The maximum program value of the XM17 contract could be worth up to $580 million. The competition was open caliber to allow submissions chambered in larger rounds; the solicitation does not specifically mention expanding bullet use, but it also does not prohibit it. Each manufacturer can submit two gun/ammunition combinations if they are differing calibers. Interested vendors had until late January 2016 to submit bids, one year after the RFP was originally planned to be released.

=== Competitors ===
Twelve pistols were entered into the competition:

- (Italy) : Beretta APX chambered in 9mm NATO and .40 S&W.
- (Czech Republic) : CZ P-07 MHS and P-09 MHS chambered in 9mm NATO and .40 S&W.
- (Belgium) : FN Herstal FN FNS variant, from which the FN 509 Tactical was developed.
- (Austria) : Glock 17 MHS and 19 MHS chambered in 9mm NATO, and the Glock 22 MHS and 23 MHS chambered in .40 S&W, respectively.
- (United States) : KRISS USA Sphinx SDP variant chambered in 9mm NATO.
- (United States) : SIG Sauer P320 MHS, a variant of the P320.
- (United States) : Smith & Wesson M&P M2.0; in co-operation with General Dynamics Ordnance and Tactical Systems.
- (United States) : STI and Detonics Defense STX.

Sturm, Ruger & Co. designed a pistol series, the Ruger American Pistol, based on the specifications of the MHS, but ultimately declined to formally submit any variant of it for consideration.

A down-selection to three weapon systems was expected to be made in August 2016, leading the way into a nine-month Production Verification Test (PVT) program. Following the successful conclusion of the PVT, a preferred bidder was intended to be selected ahead of low-rate initial production and first deliveries to U.S. armed forces.

=== MHS contract awarded to SIG Sauer ===
The Army Times reported on January 19, 2017, that the contract for the new US handgun had been awarded to SIG Sauer Inc. on January 18, 2017. Several news sources at the 2017 Shooting, Hunting, Outdoor Trade (SHOT) Show, as well as SIG Sauer, stated that the SIG Sauer P320 had been selected as the winner of the $580 million contract, for both full-sized M17 and compact M18 models. The 9 mm version of the pistol was chosen, with the contract allowing the government to purchase XM1152 FMJ and XM1153 Special Purpose (SP) ammunition and training rounds. An Army press release stated, "The Army determined that this MHS (full size handgun, compact handgun, ammunition, and ancillary components) was the best value in terms of its performance capability, the terms and conditions of the vendor's proposal, and price."

=== Introduction into service ===
November 27, 2017 the 101st Airborne Division received the first of the M17 handguns and gear that go along with it. Fielding was completed in FY202.

=== Post-introduction testing ===
In January 2018, the Director, Operational Test and Evaluation published its report on the testing of the XM17, which highlighted some deficiencies. Notably, the weapon initially performed poorly in drop tests, causing a discharge when dropped; this issue was fixed by replacing the trigger group with components lighter in weight. Additionally, the weapon performed poorly with ball ammunition, causing several double ejections (ejecting a live round simultaneously with the spent casing of the round just fired) and stoppages. The analysis of this problem is still ongoing. The weapon performed well in other fields, with the exception of the mean rounds between stoppage failure, which is related to the previously noted issue.

== Controversy and legal issues ==
The outcome of the XM17 competition created controversy within the firearms industry. The entries from Glock and SIG Sauer were down-selected as the two finalists of the competition. Once down-selected, the two finalists are supposed to undergo a second phase of Production Verification Testing (PVT) which includes a 22,500-round endurance test as well as environmental testing. However, the XM17 contract was awarded to SIG Sauer before these tests could be carried out. Explicit reasoning for this is unknown, although it has been attributed in-part to SIG Sauer aggressively underbidding their cost per handgun.

Shortly after, on February 24, 2017, Glock filed a protest of the contract award with the Government Accountability Office (GAO); the GAO denied the bid protest on June 5, 2017.

== See also ==
- Joint Combat Pistol
