= SIG Sauer M17 =

US military service pistol

M17/M18
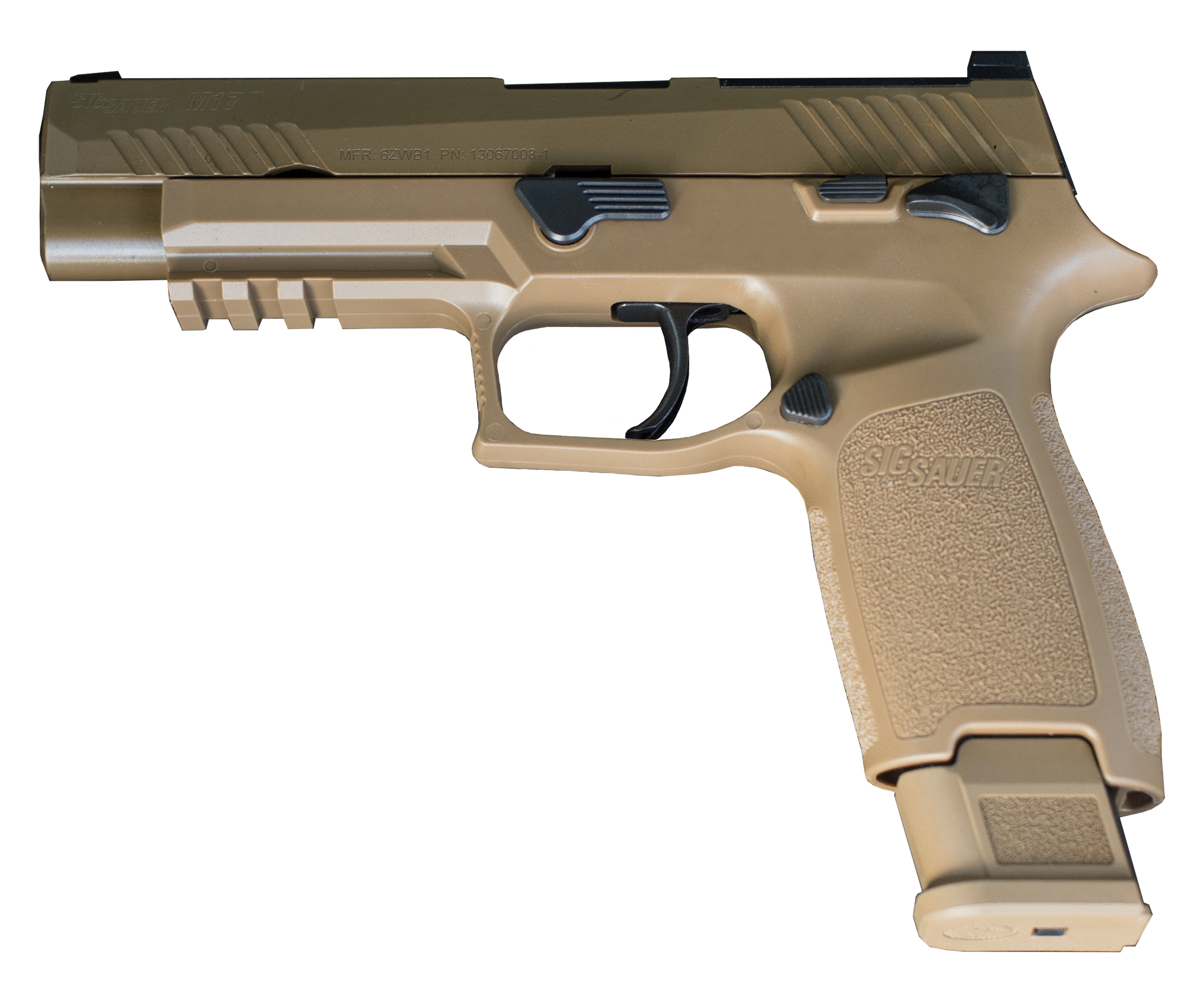
- Standard issue M17 with 21-round magazine inserted
- Type: Semi-automatic pistol
- Place of origin: United States

Service history
- In service: 2017–present
- Used by: See users
- Wars: Global War on Terrorism; War in Afghanistan

Production history
- Designer: Tim Butler
- Designed: 2015–2017
- Manufacturer: SIG Sauer, Inc., Newington, New Hampshire, U.S.
- Produced: 2017–present
- No. built: 200,000
- Variants: M18

Specifications
- Mass: M17 834 g (29.4 oz); M18 737 g (26.0 oz)
- Length: M17 203 mm (8.0 in); M18 183 mm (7.2 in)
- Barrel length: M17 120 mm (4.7 in); M18 98 mm (3.9 in)
- Width: 35.5 mm (1.40 in)
- Height: 140 mm (5.5 in)
- Cartridge: 9mm NATO
- Action: Short recoil-operated
- Effective firing range: 25 m (27 yd)
- Maximum firing range: 50 m (55 yd)
- Feed system: 17 or 21-round box magazine
- Sights: self-illuminating iron sights for low-light conditions

The SIG Sauer M17 and M18 are service pistols derived from the SIG Sauer P320 in use with the United States Armed Forces.

== Design ==
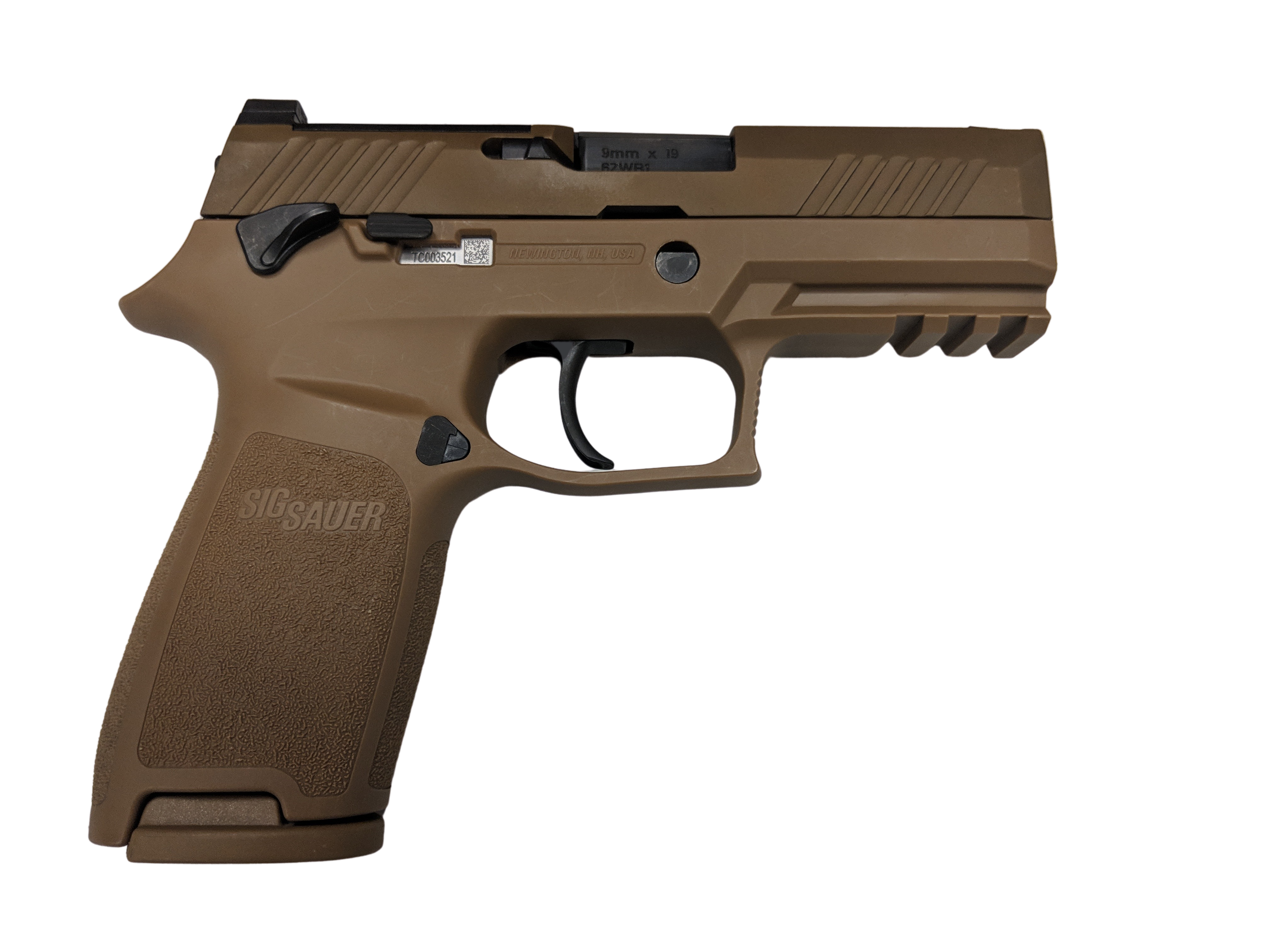
Standard issue M18 with 17-round magazine inserted

When the requirements were formulated for a new handgun for the U.S. Army, one of the tenets of the proposal was to use an existing handgun model to meet the requirements outlined in the Modular Handgun System Request for Proposal, known as the XM17 Procurement.

SIG Sauer submitted a modified P320 for the XM17 Modular Handgun System competition.

=== Modifications ===
- Slide cut out to facilitate the addition of a reflex sight; this is the slide from the RX Series.
- Ambidextrous thumb safety.
- Loaded chamber indicator.
- Improved slide sub-assembly to capture small components when disassembled.
- Improved trigger "mud flap" to prevent foreign debris from entering the pistol action.
- 120 mm (4.7 in) barrel length in full-size M17.
- 98 mm (3.9 in) barrel length in carry-size M18.
- A 17-round standard magazine, with an optional 21-round extended magazine available.
- Steel components are given a physical vapor deposition (PVD) corrosion-resistant finish.
- Using spanner screws instead of normal screws to resist disassembly further than field stripping by non-armorer users.
- Chambered in 9mm NATO; unable to adopt other calibers or frames because of the spanner screw on the frame's chassis.

The Modular Handgun System has self-illuminating tritium sights for low-light conditions, an integrated rail for attaching enablers, and an Army standard suppressor conversion kit for attaching an acoustic/flash suppressor. Every M17/M18 handgun is test fired before leaving the factory with 13 rounds -- three to break in the weapon and ten to test accuracy.

=== Ammunition ===
Though the pistol remained chambered in 9mm NATO rather than a larger caliber, the contract allowed the Army and other services to procure SIG Sauer's proposed XM1152 Full Metal Jacket (FMJ) and XM1153 Special Purpose/Jacketed Hollow Point (JHP) ammunition.

The ammunition is a "Winchester jacketed hollow-point" round; similar in appearance to the Winchester PDX1 round but with some differences to the design of the hollow-point petals.

One round is a standard 115 gr (7.5 g) ball/Full Metal Jacket (FMJ), designated the M1152, the other is a 147 gr (9.5 g) Special Purpose/Jacketed Hollow Point (JHP) round designated the M1153.

Olin Corporation (Winchester Brand) received a contract to produce approximately 1.2 million rounds of the ammunition.

== History ==
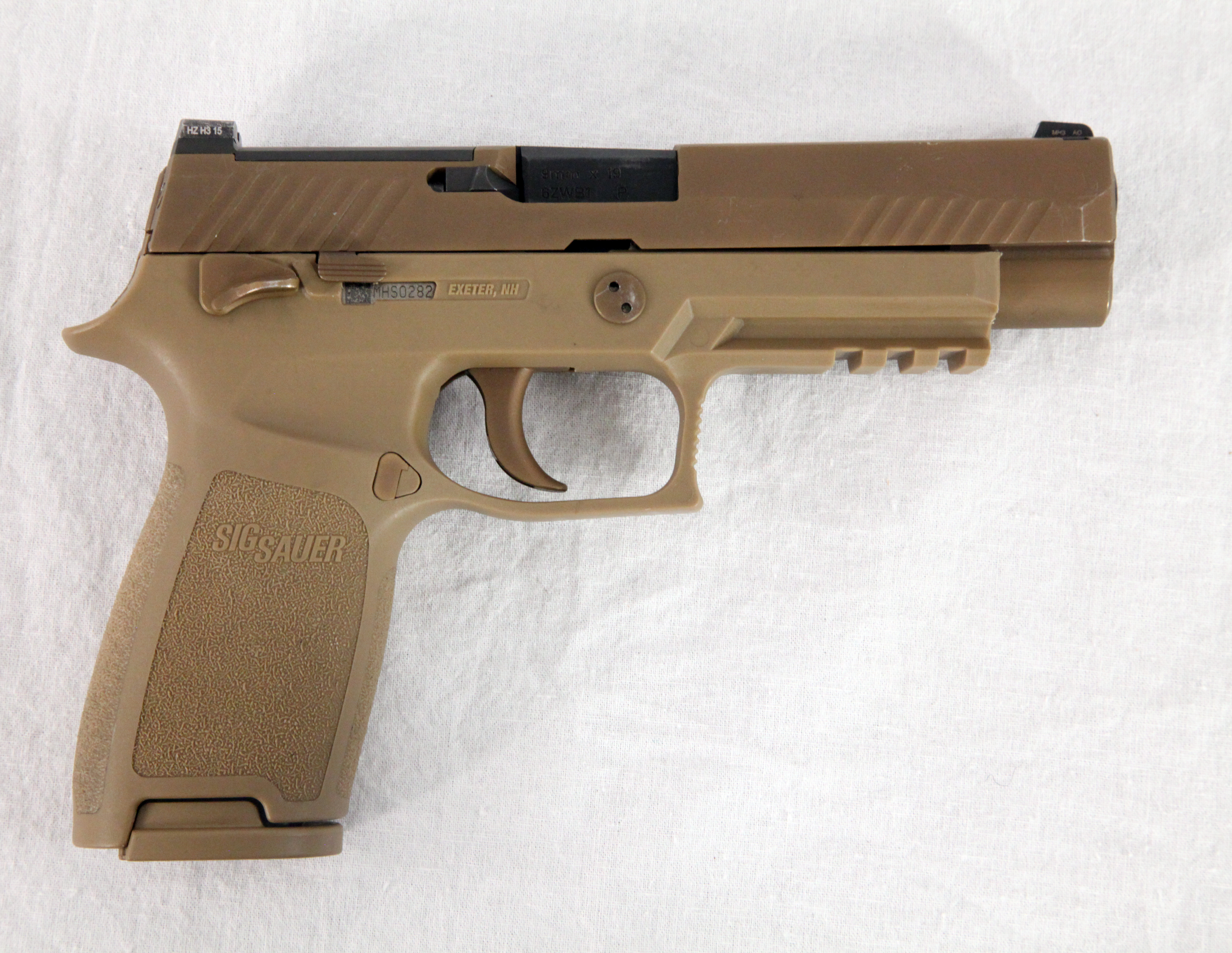
The XM17 prototype with 17-round magazine inserted. Brown triggers, levers, and catches were used only early in production.

On January 19, 2017, the United States Army announced that the SIG Sauer P320 MHS variant had won the military's Modular Handgun System trials.

The modified P320 was subsequently designated the M17 (Full-Size) and M18 (Carry) for U.S. military service.

The M17 has better accuracy, ergonomics, and tighter dispersion than the Beretta M9, and will be fielded more widely, being issued down to squad and fireteam leaders.

=== Assessment recommendations ===
The first annual report for the XM17/XM18 Modular Handgun System (MHS) program assessment recommended that the Army:

1. Upon identification of the root cause of the double ejections and ball ammunition reliability problems, confirm fixes to both the XM17 and XM18 in future testing.
2. Work with the vendor to identify and eliminate the cause of variability in the manufacture of the trigger group mechanism.
3. Consider redesign of the slide catch lever and other operator training changes to prevent engagement by operators while shooting the pistol.

=== 2025 Air Force safety investigation ===
On July 20, 2025, a United States Air Force airman at Francis E. Warren Air Force Base was killed by the apparent unintentional discharge of an M18. The Air Force Global Strike Command ordered use of the M18 to be paused until further notice. An airman was arrested the next month and charged with obstruction of justice and involuntary manslaughter in connection with the death.

The pause began on July 21, 2025, and included 7,970 weapons. 191 pistols were removed from service with issues centered on problems with the safety lever, striker assembly, and sear. The remainder were returned to service on August 25, 2025. The AFGSC has implemented enhanced inspections to include issues found with the removed weapons.

== Tomb of the Unknown Soldier pistols ==
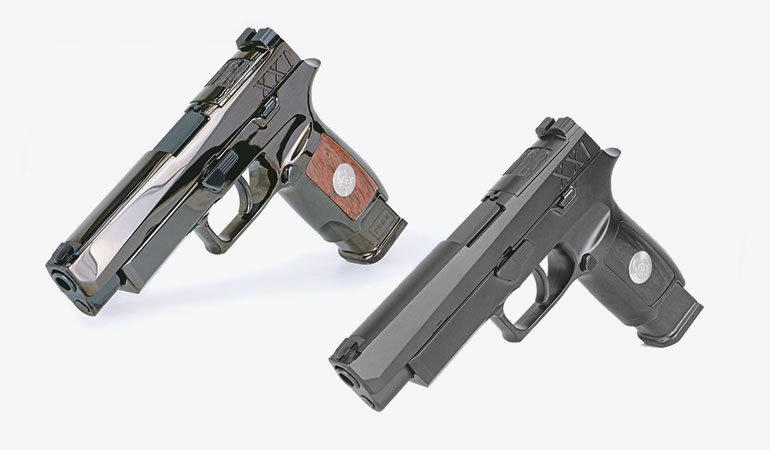
Day and night variants of the ceremonial M17

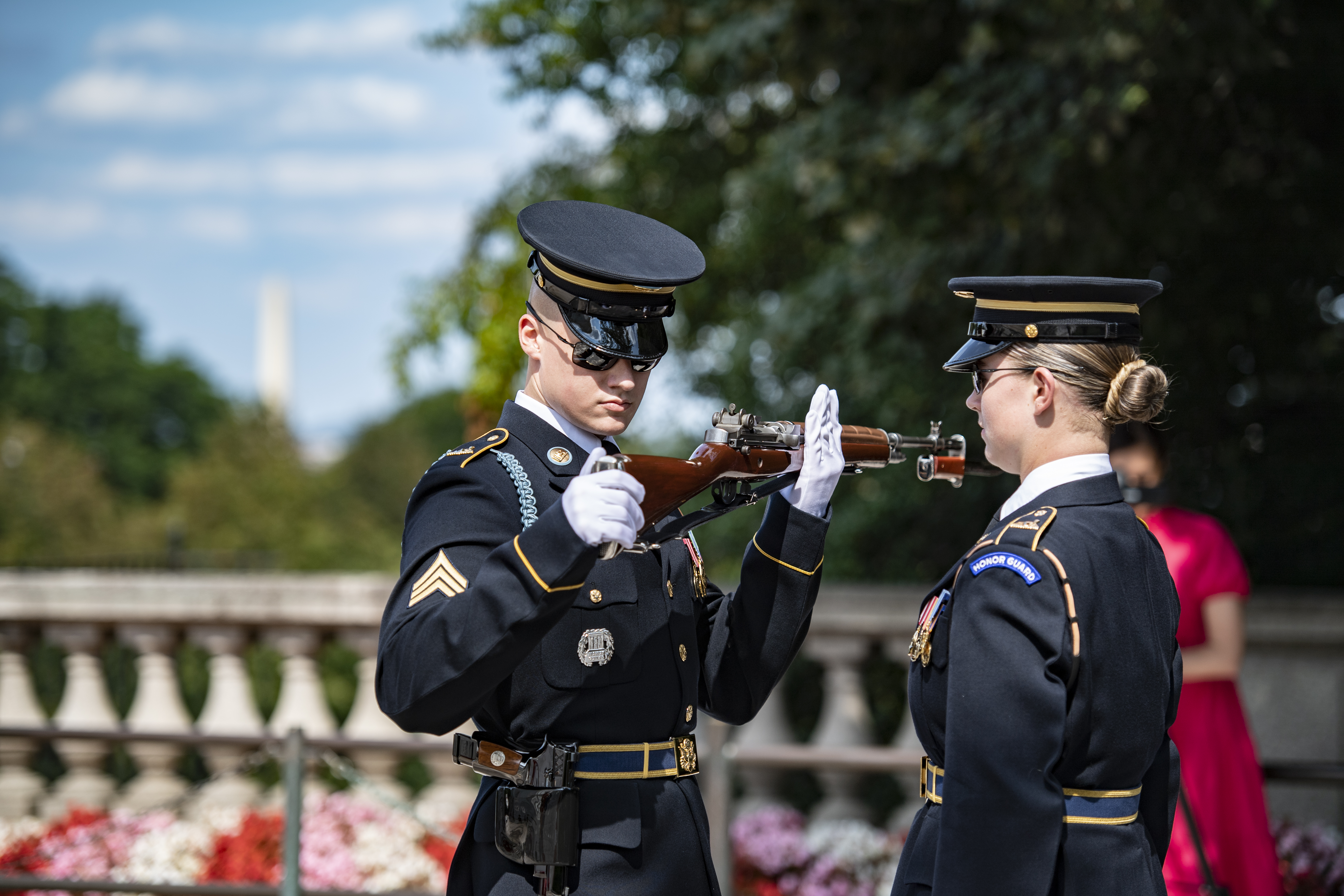
Tomb Guard carrying one of the two polished ceremonial M17s in July 2021

On October 11, 2018, four ceremonial M17s built by Sig Sauer's Custom Shop were presented to The Old Guard for use by the Sentinels who guard the Tomb of the Unknown Soldier at Arlington National Cemetery.

Each of the four pistols bears a specific name and theme engraved on the pistol's dust cover: Silence, Respect, Dignity, and Perseverance. "Silence" and "Respect" are highly polished pistols with brown wood handgrips, which are used for daylight hours, while "Dignity" and "Perseverance" are matte black pistols with black wood handgrips for night duty and bouts of inclement weather.

All four guns were made with an aluminum frame rather than the polymer plastic of the standard M17, while the controls are the standard matte black. The rear slide cocking serrations of the regular M17 are replaced with "XXI", a reference to the twenty-one steps the guards take on their patrol in front of the Tomb, as well as the 21-gun salute. The sight plates were laser-engraved with three Greek figures, Peace, Victory, and Valor, based on a digitized image of the figures as carved into the Tomb.

Various materials of significance were incorporated into the pistols; the wooden grips on the daytime pistols were crafted from deck planks originally fitted on the USS Olympia, the ship which carried the first Unknown Soldier to the United States in 1921, while the front sight posts on all four pistols feature glass vials holding marble dust that was taken when the "Vietnam" crypt had its inscription changed to "Honoring and Keeping Faith with America's Missing Servicemen 1958 – 1975".

=== Serial numbers ===
The pistols are serialized with a unique set of serial numbers that incorporate items of significance to the Old Guard: "LS" represents line six of the Sentinels' Creed, "My standard will remain perfection"; "02JUL37" to signify the first 24-hour guard posted at the Tomb of the Unknown on July 3, 1937; and "21" to signify the 21 steps it takes the Tomb Sentinels to walk by the Tomb of the Unknown and the military honor of a 21 Gun Salute.

=== Magazines ===
Tomb Sentinels carry the pistol with the 21-round magazine inserted.

The magazines are customized, and feature an aluminum base plate engraved with the names of the Greek figures featured on the Tomb of the Unknown – Peace, Victory, and Valor – and include a name plate on the bottom of the magazine engraved with the Tomb Sentinel badge number.

== Commercial variants ==
=== P320-M17 ===
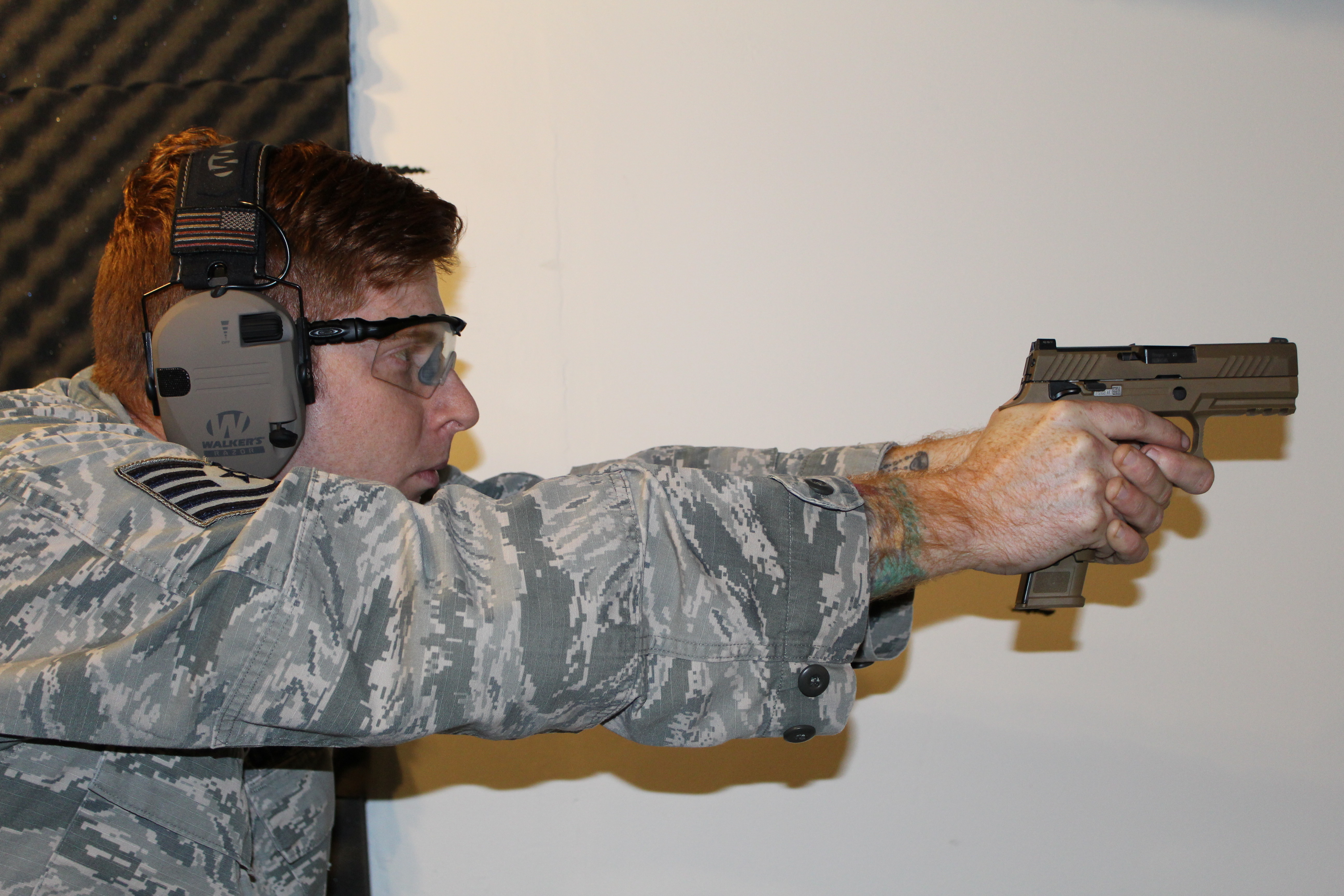
A USAF technical sergeant fires an M18 with 21-round magazine inserted.

In 2018, SIG Sauer released a civilian-market variant of the handgun, the P320-M17.

The firearm is nearly identical, albeit lacking the tamper-resistant takedown screws, and available with or without an external manual safety.

The P320-M17 stainless steel slide is PVD-coated, and the control elements feature a black finish, as found on later military M17 service pistol batches.

According to SIG Sauer, 9mm NATO (a commercial +P overpressure variant) 8.05 g (124 gr) loads released in 2018 out of the SIG P320-M17 have a muzzle velocity of 365 m/s (1,198 ft/s) and muzzle energy of 535 J (395 ft⋅lbf).

=== M17 Commemorative ===
A commemorative edition was also released, called simply the M17 Commemorative, produced in the exact specification of the original gun delivered to the Army.

It includes the brown trigger and controls, as well as the same magazines selected by the military. It is delivered in a plain cardboard box rather than the normal SIG Sauer hard-sided black plastic case, just as military pistols were packaged.

Production of the M17 Commemorative was limited to a run of 5,000 units.

=== P320-M18 ===
In 2020, SIG released the P320-M18 model for civilians, which features the same adaptation of the military configuration, this time with the shorter carry size M18.

== Adoption ==
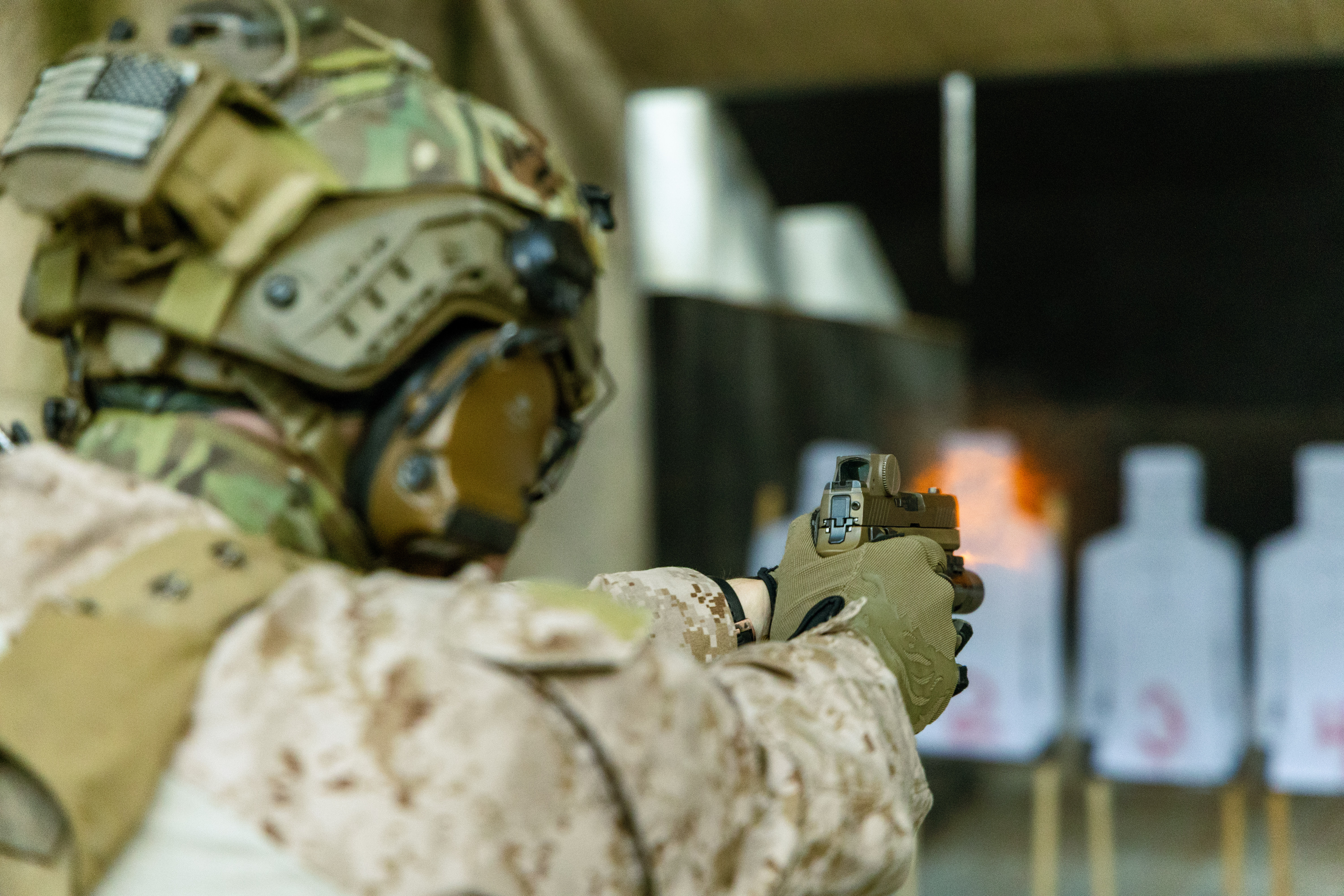
U.S. Marine firing an M18 with a Romeo-M17 red dot sight, November 2025

The M17 and M18 have subsequently been adopted by the Army, Navy, Marine Corps, Air Force, and Space Force, replacing the Beretta M9, as well as several other handguns across five of the six service branches.

The services plan to procure up to 421,000 weapons in total; 195,000 for the Army, 130,000 for the Air Force, 61,000 for the Navy (M18 compact version only), and 35,000 for the Marine Corps.

The Coast Guard is the only military branch that will not be receiving the M17 and M18, they will be replacing their SIG Sauer P229R DAK with the Glock 19 Gen5 MOS.

There are two color variants, coyote brown and black; both are available, though almost all have been produced in coyote brown.

=== Distribution ===
All Army units are planned to have the M9 replaced with the M17 by 2027.

The Army primarily ordered the M17 version, while the Air Force and Navy opted for the M18 version as their standard service pistol.

In 2019, the Marine Corps selected the M18 to replace several pistols, including the M45A1 and Glock 19, and started the process in 2020. In November 2019, SIG Sauer announced the delivery of the 100,000th M17/M18 handgun to the U.S. military.

== Users ==
- Kosovo
  - Kosovo Security Forces
- United States
  - United States Army
  - United States Navy
  - United States Marine Corps
  - United States Air Force
  - United States Space Force
