= List of weapons developed by FN Herstal =

Firearms manufactured by FN Herstal AND FN America

Belgian firearms manufacturer FN Herstal has manufactured many weapons since 1889, which are listed below.

== Weapons ==
=== Handguns ===
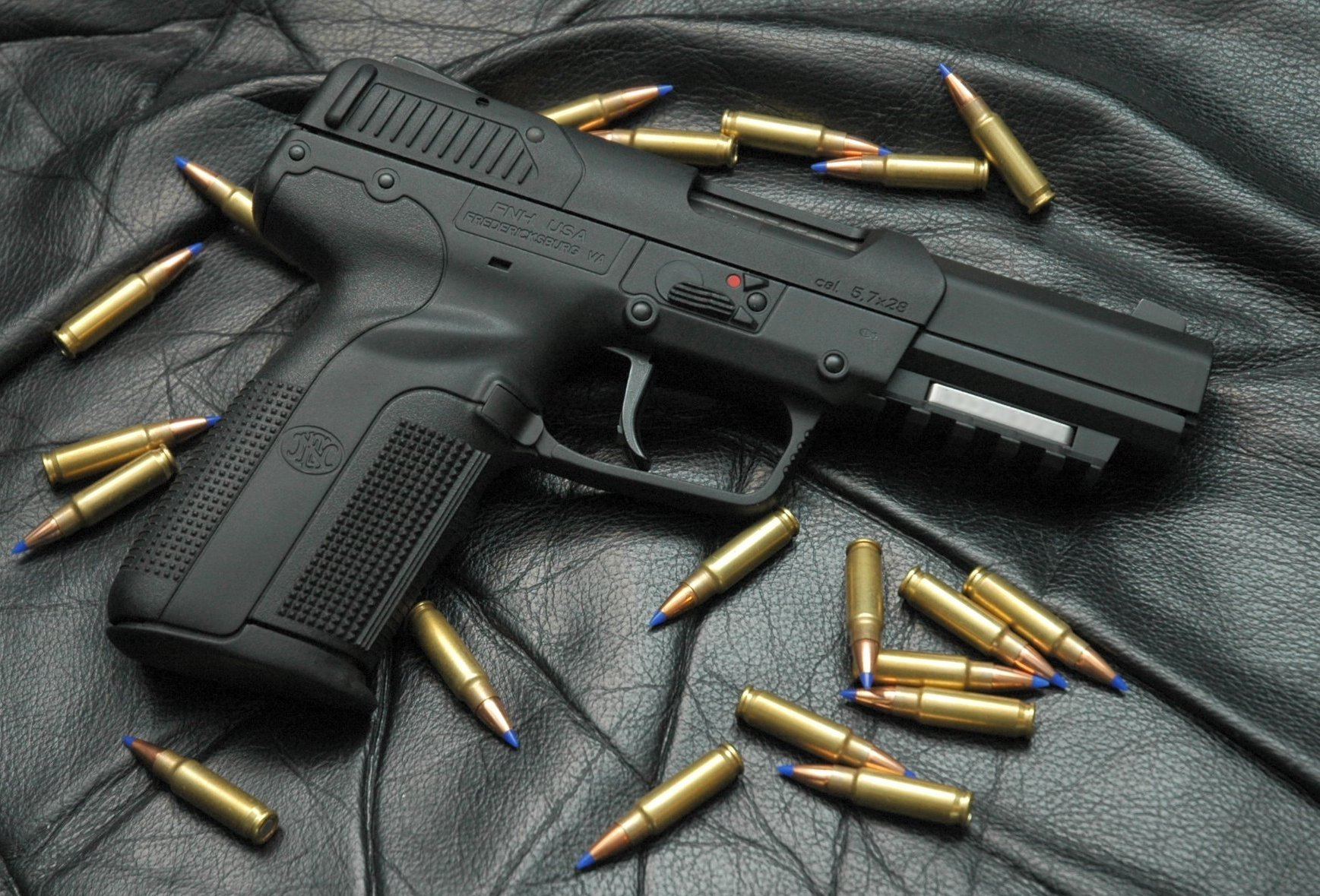
FN Five-seven pistol with 5.7×28mm cartridges

- Barracuda: Double-action multi-caliber revolver that can be switched between three calibers (9×19mm Parabellum, .38 Special and .357 Magnum) by changing parts of the cylinder.
- FN 510: 10mm Auto caliber variant of the FN 509.
- FN 545: .45 ACP caliber variant of the FN 509.
- FN 509: Redesigned version of the FNS pistol, chambered in 9×19mm Parabellum.
- FN Reflex: Subcompact "Micro-9mm" double-stack concealed carry pistol. Internally hammer-fired.
- FN 502: Redesigned hammer-fired version of the FN 509 chambered in .22 Long Rifle.
- FN 503: Subcompact single-stack concealed carry pistol, inspired by the FN 509 series.
- FN Five-seven: Lightweight polymer-framed pistol with a 20-round magazine capacity, and designed to use FN's 5.7×28mm cartridge. In service with military and police forces in over 40 nations throughout the world.
- FN HiPer: The FN HiPer is a semiautomatic striker-fired pistol. The weapon is chambered in 9×19mm NATO and fed from a 15-round magazine.
- FN FNP: Series of polymer-framed pistols offered in 9×19mm Parabellum, .357 SIG, .40 S&W, and .45 ACP.
- FN FNX: Updated and reengineered of the FNP series pistol in 9×19mm Parabellum, .40 S&W and, .45 ACP.
- FN FNS: Polymer striker-fired pistols in 9×19mm Parabellum and .40 S&W.
- FN 49: Pistol chambered for 9×19mm Parabellum and .40 S&W.
- FN/Browning Hi-Power: Single-action pistol chambered for 9×19mm Parabellum and .40 S&W. One of the most widely used military pistols of all time, having been used by the armed forces of over 50 nations.
  - FN High Power: Single-action pistol chambered for 9×19mm Parabellum. Modern Version of the original design.
- FN Grand Browning: M1911 pistol intended for the European market chambered in 9.65×23mm Browning.
- HP-DA: 9×19mm Parabellum pistol, double-action variant of the Browning Hi-Power.
- Model 1900: .32 ACP blowback semi-automatic pistol.
- Model 1903: Blowback semi-automatic pistol chambered for .32 ACP and 9×20mm Long Browning.
- Model 1905: .25 ACP vest pocket blowback semi-automatic pistol.
- Model 1910: Single-action pistol chambered for .32 ACP and .380 ACP.
- Model 1922: Similar to the FN 1910 but with a longer barrel.
- FN Baby Browning: Simplified redesign of the 1905 Vest Pocket, also chambered for .25 ACP

=== Submachine guns ===
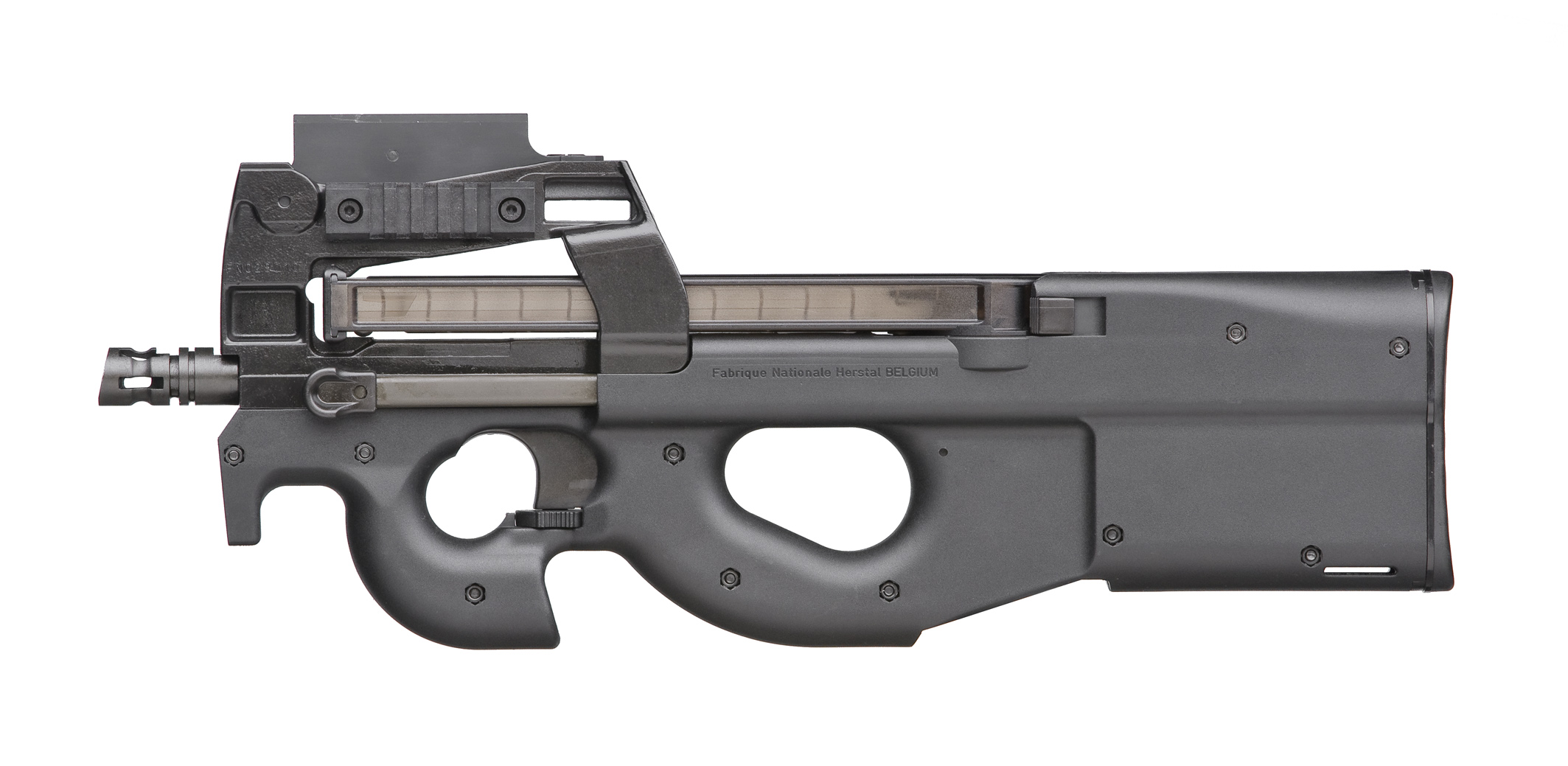
P90 personal defense weapon

- P90: Ambidextrous bullpup personal defense weapon with a top-mounted 50-round magazine and chambered for FN's 5.7×28mm cartridge. In service with military and police forces in over 40 countries.
- Uzi: Built under licence from Israel Military Industries.
- M12: built under licence from Beretta. Chambered in 9×19mm with 30-round magazine capable of firing in semi-auto, 3-round burst and full auto.

=== Rifles ===
- Trombone
- Browning 22 Semi-Auto rifle .22 LR, .22 Short. Takedown rifle. Production began in 1914 and continued through 1974 in Belgium.
- CAL: Carabine Automatique Légère, 5.56×45mm NATO assault rifle.
- FN .30 Carbine:
- F2000: 5.56×45mm NATO bullpup assault rifle, part of a system with a computerized sight and 40mm grenade launcher or 12 gauge shotgun.
  - FS2000: Semi-automatic sporting version of the F2000 rifle.
- FAL: Fusil Automatique Léger, 7.62×51mm NATO battle rifle. One of the most widely used rifles in history, having been used by over 90 nations.
- FN-15
- FNAR: Semi-automatic rifle chambered in 7.62×51mm NATO.
- FNC: Fabrique Nationale Carabine, 5.56×45mm NATO assault rifle.
- IWS: .264 caliber assault rifle.https://soldiersystems.net/2023/01/16/the-fn-america-fna
- AMG: .264 caliber assault machine gun.
- M16: 5.56×45mm NATO rifle (produced under license by Colt Defense via a U.S. Government contract since 1991, by FNH USA).
- M4A1: 5.56×45mm NATO rifle (produced under contract from the U.S. Government since 2013 by FNH USA).
- Mle 1930: Belgian variant of the Browning M1918, chambered in 7.65×53mm Belgian Mauser.
- Model 1949: Semi-automatic rifle / selective fire automatic rifle chambered in .30-06 Springfield, 7.92×57mm Mauser, 7.62×51mm NATO, and 7×57mm Mauser.
- PS90: Semi-automatic sporting carbine version of the P90 submachine gun.
- SCAR: SOF Combat Assault Rifle, modular assault/battle rifle system with dedicated versions in 5.56×45mm NATO and 7.62×51mm NATO.
- ARKA: 5.56×45mm NATO assault rifle unveiled in 2026. The rifle combines the SCAR internal short-stroke gas piston system with the ergonomics of an AR-15 platform.

==== Bolt-action rifles ====
- Mauser Model 1889 and derivatives
- Mauser Model 1893
- Model 1924 / Model 1930: Carbine and rifle based on the Mauser 98 carbine.
- Karabiner 98k: 7.92×57mm Mauser bolt-action rifle produced post-World War II.
- Model 1950: .30-06 Springfield bolt-action rifle; updated version of the Model 1930.
- Model 30-11: 7.62×51mm NATO bolt-action sniper rifle developed from FN-built Mauser Karabiner 98k rifles.
- FN Ballista: Modular .338 Lapua Magnum long range sniper rifle that is convertible to .308 Winchester or .300 Winchester Magnum calibers.
- Patrol Bolt Rifle: 7.62×51mm NATO bolt-action rifle intended for police patrol cruisers.
- Special Police Rifle: Special Police Rifle; bolt-action sniper rifle based on the Winchester Model 70, chambered in 7.62×51mm NATO and .300 Winchester Magnum, intended for FBI and SWAT teams.
- Tactical Sport Rifle: Tactical Sports Rifle based on the SPR.

=== Machine guns ===
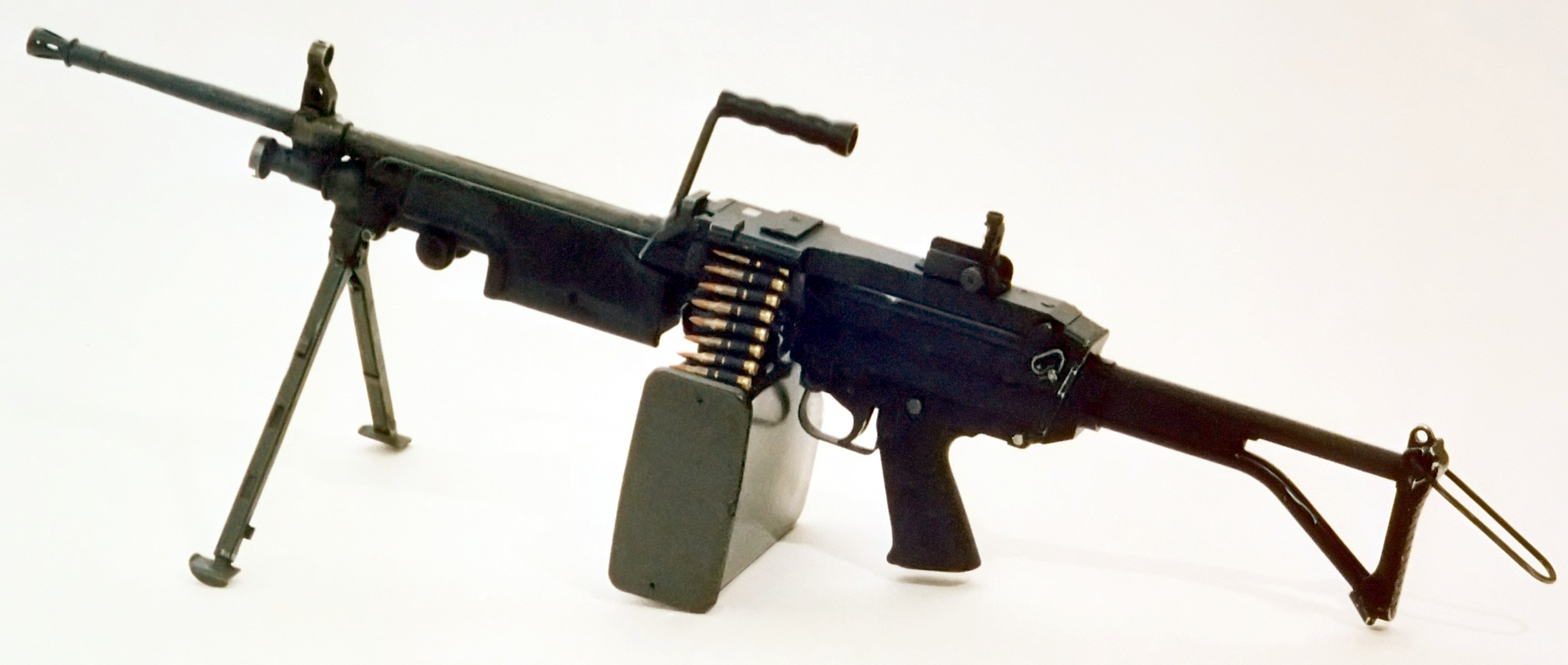
Early M249 manufacture of FN Minimi

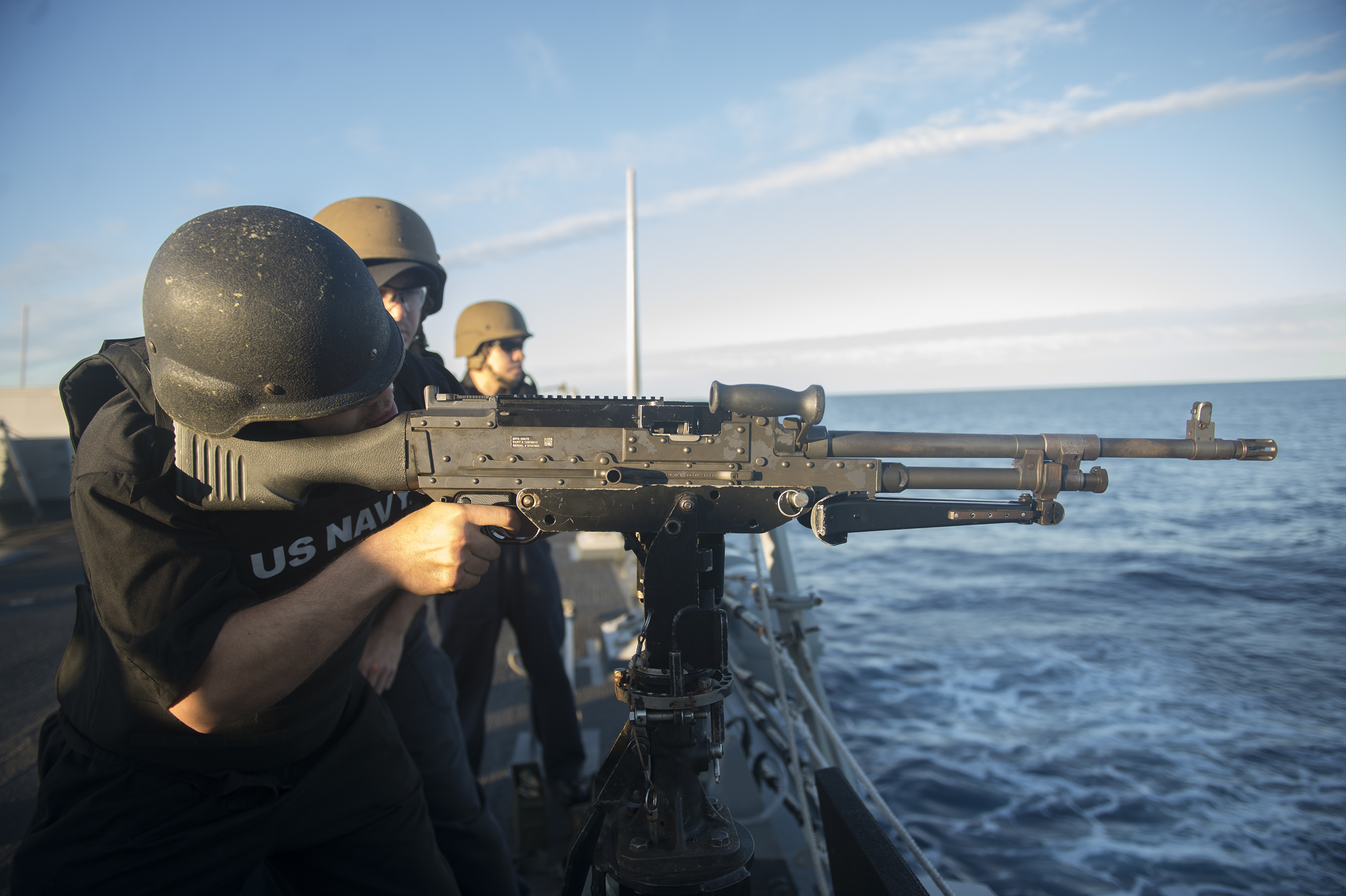
United States sailor fires an M240G, a U.S. version of the FN MAG, adopted for infantry use in the 1990s

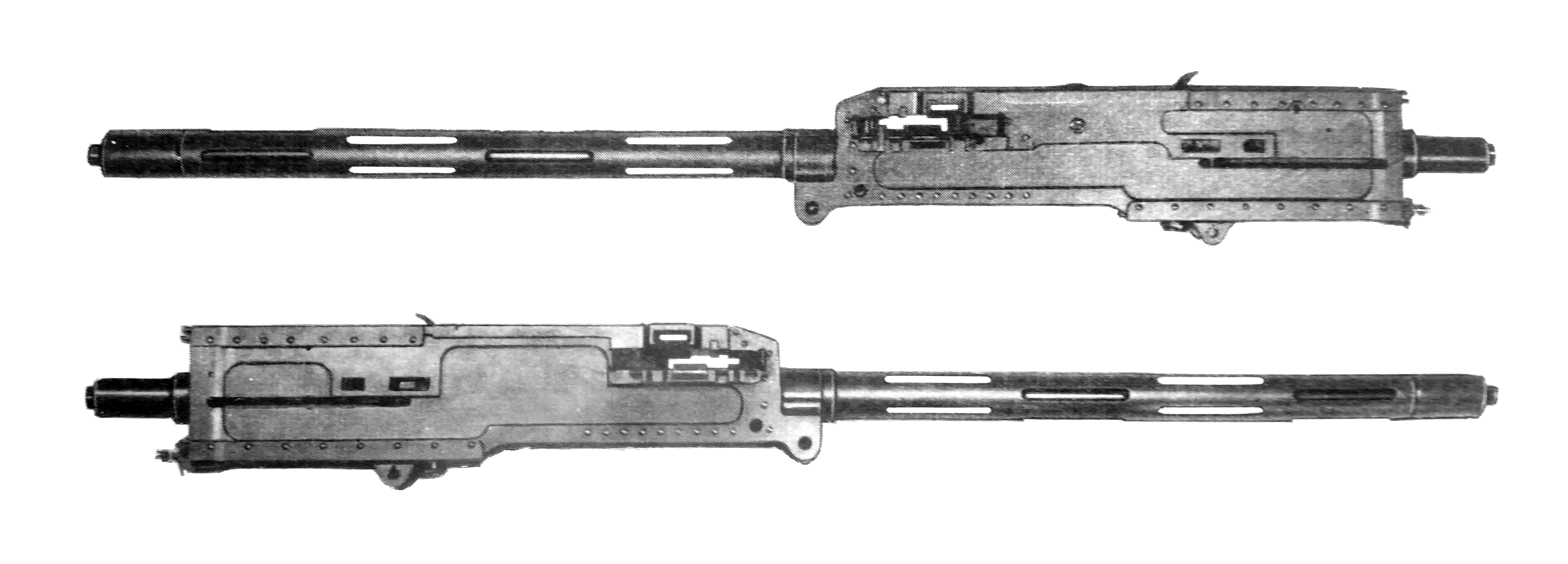
Mitrailleuse d´Avion Browning - F.N. Calibre 13,2 mm airplane machine gun

- FN BRG-15: Experimental heavy machine gun chambered in 15.5×115mm.
- M2 Browning: .50 BMG (12.7×99mm NATO) heavy machine gun produced under licence.
- M3M 50BMG (GAU-21) single barrel rapid fire machine gun for rotary-wing aircraft with a rate of fire between 950-1100 RPM.
- MAG: Mitrailleuse d'Appui Général, 7.62×51mm NATO general-purpose machine gun. Used by more than 80 nations, and made under licence in countries such as Argentina, Egypt, India, Singapore, the United Kingdom and the United States as M240 machine gun.
- Minimi: Mini Mitrailleuse, 5.56×45mm NATO light machine gun. In service in over 75 nations and used in the United States as the M249 SAW.
- Mark 48 machine gun: Variant of the M249 light machine gun. Chambered in 7.62×51mm NATO, and developed to meet a United States special forces requirement.
- FN BAR Model 1930 BAR: Licence-built version of the M1918 BAR, rechambered for the 7.92×57mm Mauser cartridge.
- M3 (FN M3M/GAU-21 and FN M3P): A belt-fed heavy machine gun which is a modernized form of the M2 Browning .50 caliber heavy machine gun. It is intended for vehicle, watercraft and aircraft mounting.
- FN EVOLYS: A machine gun developed in 2021, chambered for 5.56×45mm and 7.62×51mm ammunition

=== Shotguns ===
- FN P-12: 12-gauge pump-action shotgun with 18-inch barrel and 5-round capacity.
- FN Self-loading Police: 12-gauge gas-operated semi-automatic shotgun offered in four different models with various barrel lengths, sight options, and capacities. Introduced in 2008, and named "2009 Shotgun of the Year" by American Rifleman magazine.
- FN Tactical Police Shotgun: 12-gauge pump-action shotgun with 5 or 8-round capacity. It is an upgraded version of the Winchester Repeating Arms Company Winchester 1300.
- Browning Auto-5 recoil-operated semi-automatic shotgun with 5-round capacity, designed by John Browning.

=== Helicopter and aircraft weapon systems ===
- Mitrailleuse d´Avion Browning - F.N. Calibre 13,2 mm: Heavy airplane machine gun. It was an improved M2 Browning for use in aircraft during WWII. The weapon had increased firerate and fired a more powerful 13.2x99 Hotchkiss cartridge. FN also invented a high velocity high explosive variant of the cartridge just for this weapon.
- FN HMP250: Heavy Machine Gun Pod. It is a system featuring a .50 cal FN M3P machine gun, a 275-round ammunition box, and a links and cases collector.
- FN HMP400: Heavy Machine Gun Pod. It is a system featuring a .50 cal FN M3P machine gun, a 400-round ammunition box capacity, and a links or links and cases collector.
- FN RMP: Rocket Machine Gun Pod. It is system comprising a 12.7mm (.50 caliber) FN M3P machine gun, a NATO Standard 2.75inch/70mm 3-tube rocket launcher and a 400-round machine gun ammunition box.

=== Miscellaneous ===
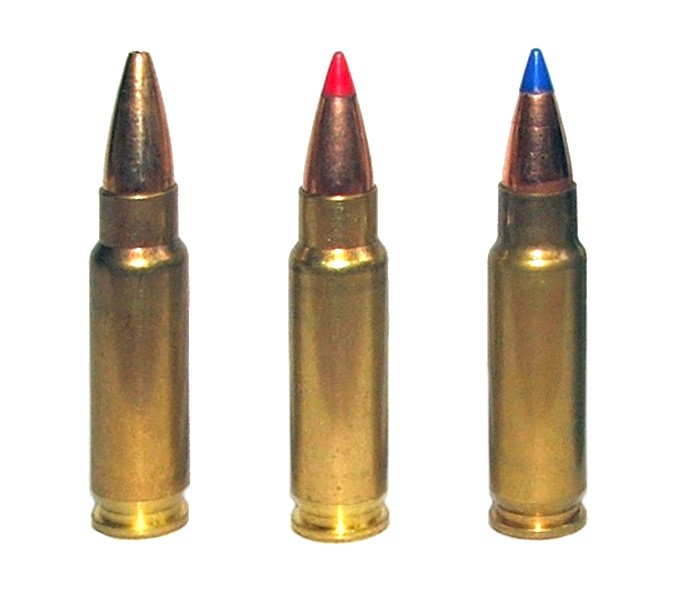
FN 5.7×28mm cartridges as used in P90 personal defense weapon and Five-seven pistol

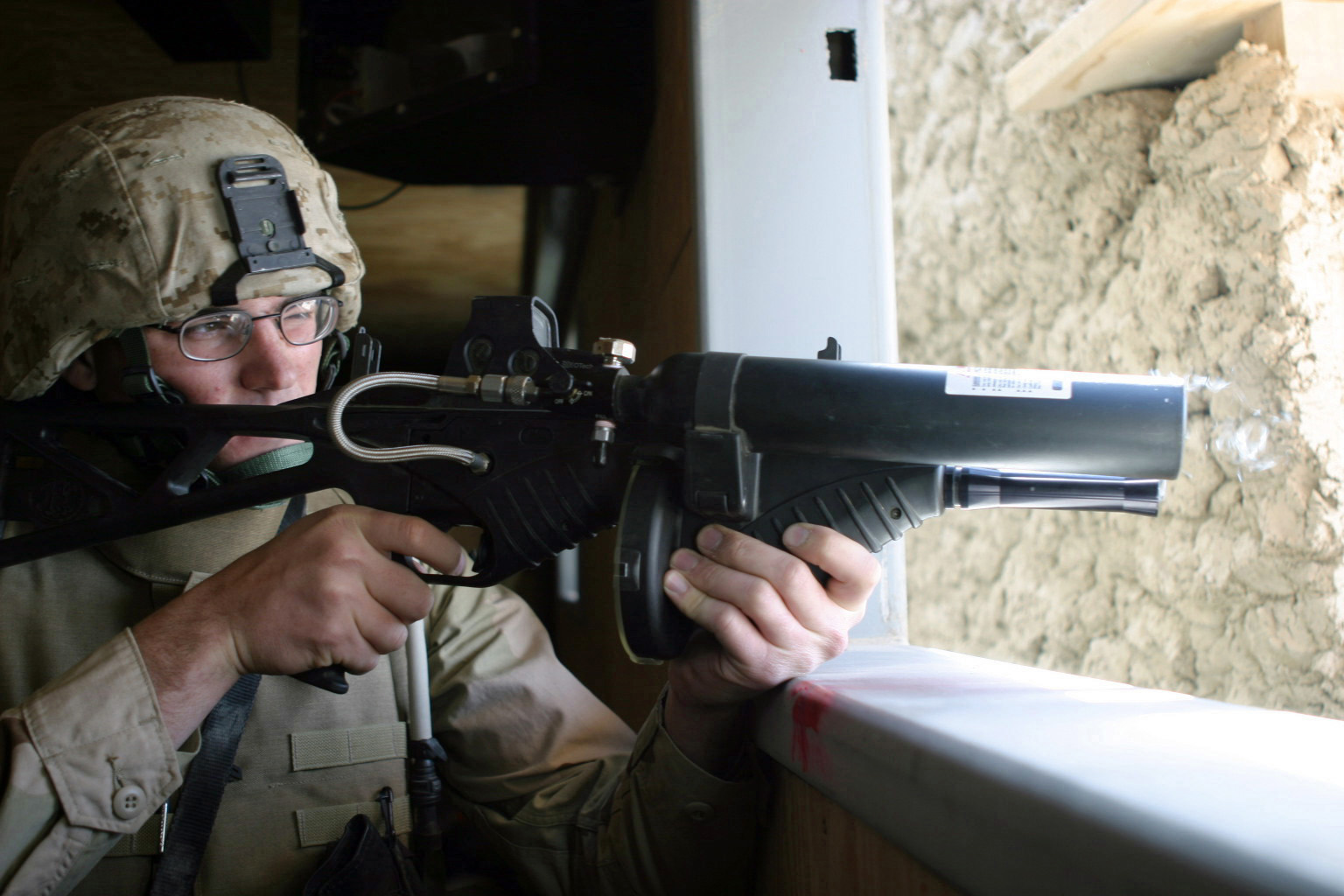
U.S. Marine aiming FN 303 fitted with holographic weapon sight

- 5.56×45mm SS109: NATO standard 5.56×45mm cartridge.
- 5.7×28mm: Small-caliber, high-velocity cartridge designed for use with the FN P90 PDW and FN Five-seven pistol.
- EGLM: 40mm Ergonomic Grenade Launcher Module designed for the FN SCAR.
- 303: Less-lethal 17 mm multi-shot projectile launcher.
- 303 Pistol: Pistol version of the less-lethal FN 303 launcher.
- FN Telgren telescoping shoot-through rifle-grenade.
- In 1938 the FN modified M1919 Browning aircraft guns to accept 7.5mm French rounds (modification known as "FN Mle 38")
- FN SmartCore.
