= FN 510 =

Polymer frame semi-automatic handgun

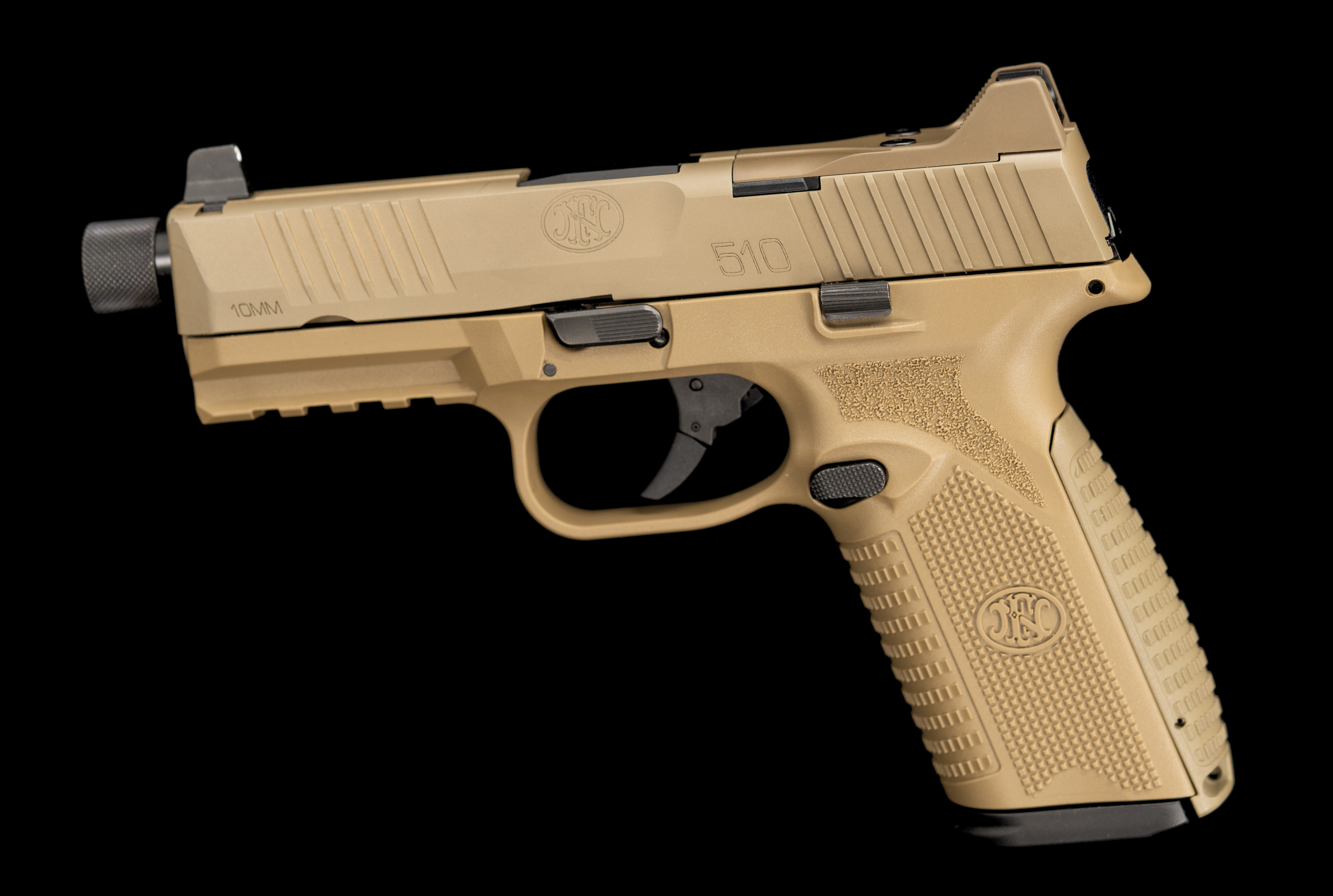
- FN 510 Tactical
- Type: Semi-automatic pistol
- Place of origin: United States

Production history
- Manufacturer: FN America
- Unit cost: $1,139 (MSRP)
- Produced: 2023–present

Specifications
- Mass: 31.0 oz (880 g) (Standard); 32.0 oz (910 g) (Tactical)
- Length: 7.7 in (200 mm) (Standard); 8.3 in (210 mm) (Tactical)
- Barrel length: 4.1 in (100 mm) (Standard); 4.71 in (120 mm) (Tactical)
- Width: 1.45 in (37 mm)
- Height: 6.0 in (150 mm)
- Cartridge: 10mm Auto
- Action: Double action
- Feed system: 10-, 15- or 22-round box magazine
- Sights: Fixed 3-dot; Tactical and MRD (Note: MRD is an abbreviation for miniature red dot)

The FN 510 is a polymer frame striker-fired semi-automatic pistol manufactured by FN America, a division of FN Herstal.

== History ==
The 510 was released in 2023 alongside the FN 545, which is chambered in .45 ACP.

== Design ==
Based on the FN 509, the FN 510 is a striker-fired handgun with a stainless steel slide with ferritic nitrocarburizing finish and a polymer frame.

Black and flat dark earth (FDE) colorings are available.

The FN 510's barrel length is 4.1 inches (100 mm) for the Standard Full Size (MRD) model & 4.71 inches (120 mm) for the Tactical model. The backstrap of the grip accepts interchangeable inserts; one arched and one flat.

The slide has serrations on both front and back, for easy slide manipulation.

=== Operation ===
The FN 510 features double-action operation with magazine releases and slide locks present on both sides of the gun, plus a Picatinny rail located forward of the trigger guard.

Instead of a manual safety, the 510 includes an integrated trigger safety (the articulated trigger type like the FN FNS) as part of its four passive safety systems: a striker block, a drop safety, a trigger disconnect and a trigger safety lever.

=== Magazines ===
The FN 510 primarily uses 15-round magazines; 10-round magazines are available for states with a high-capacity magazine ban.

=== Ammunition ===
The FN 510 is chambered in 10mm Auto.

== Variants ==
Several variants of the FN 510 have been made available:

=== Tactical ===
4.71-inch (120 mm) barrel length, 15- and 22-round magazines, available in black or FDE, threaded barrel, raised sights (to accommodate a suppressor), with low-profile optics mounting system (for a red dot sight).

=== Standard (MRD) ===
4.1-inch (100 mm) barrel length, 15-round magazines, available in black or FDE, with low-profile optics mounting system.

== See also ==
- FN FNS
- FN FNX
- FN FNP
- FN 509
- FN 503
- FN 502
- FN 545
- FN HiPer
- FN Five-seveN
- Browning Hi-Power
