= FN Forty-Nine =

FN 49
- Type: Semi-automatic pistol
- Place of origin: Belgium/United States

Production history
- Manufacturer: FN Herstal
- Unit cost: $470 (MSRP)
- Produced: 2000–c. 2005

Specifications
- Mass: 26 oz (740 g) (.40 S&W); 26.3 oz (750 g) (9mm)
- Length: 7.75 in (197 mm)
- Barrel length: 4.25 in (108 mm)
- Cartridge: .40 S&W, 9×19mm Parabellum
- Action: Locked breech, DAO
- Feed system: Box magazine: 10-round (both), 16-round (9mm), 14-round (.40 S&W)
- Sights: Iron sights

The FN Forty-Nine (also FN 49) is a recoil operated, locked breech semi-automatic pistol developed by the Belgian company FN Herstal, and manufactured in the United States. The name of the pistol reflects its two chamberings, .40 S&W (forty caliber) and 9×19mm Parabellum, while also matching the manufacturer's initials (FN).

== Overview ==
The FN Forty-Nine was designed to be a modern semi-automatic pistol with modern pistol chambering, (Note: i.e by late 1990s/early 2000's standards.) intended for law-enforcement and military markets.

Introduced in 2000, the 49 pistol was apparently discontinued in early 2005, having last appeared on the company's website in late 2004. The Forty Nine did not meet the expected commercial success, and in 2003 gave rise to the more attractive FN FNP.

== Design ==
The 49 is striker-fired and uses FN's "Repeatable Secure Striker" mechanism. This means that unlike many other striker-fired pistols, the Forty-Nine operates on a double-action only (DAO) trigger mechanism, meaning that the hammer is cocked by the trigger pull before every shot. This allows the user to re-strike a misfired cartridge simply by pulling the trigger again. The trigger pull is est. 10lb which, while heavy, is reportedly very consistent.

The double-stacked detachable magazine holds sixteen rounds in 9mm caliber and fourteen in .40 S&W; 10-round magazines are also available for each caliber. There is no external (manual) safety. The frame is constructed of polymer and the slide of stainless steel. An accessory rail under the barrel allows for quick and easy mounting of laser aiming modules and flashlights.

FN Forty-Nine is considered easy to field strip and one of the more user-friendly pistols of its era.
