= FN FNX =

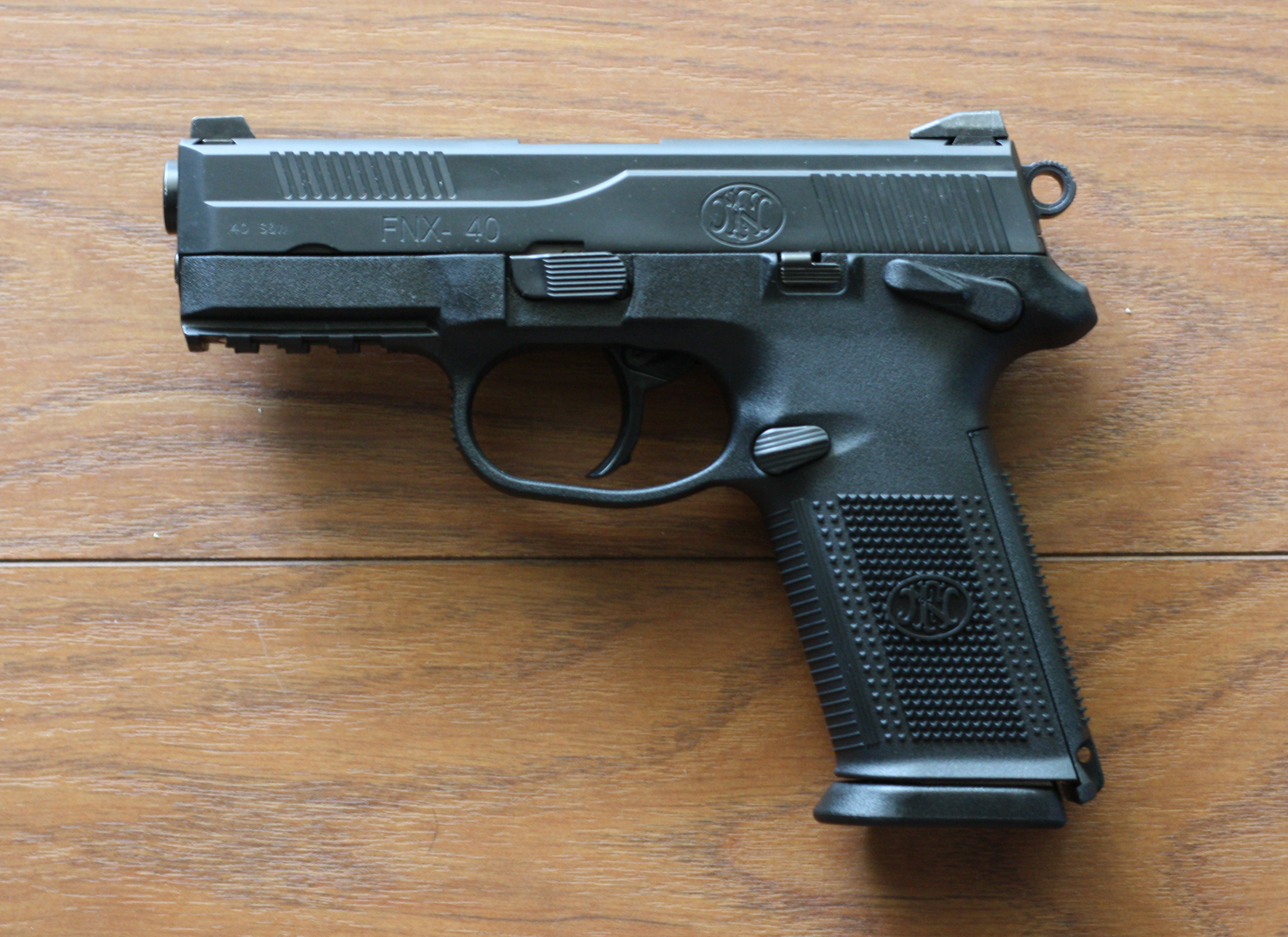
- FNX-40 with matte black slide.
- Type: Semi-automatic pistol
- Place of origin: United States; Belgium

Production history
- Manufacturer: FN America
- Produced: 2009–present
- Variants: See Variants: FNX-9 (9×19mm); FNX-40 (.40 S&W); FNX-45 (.45 ACP); FNX-45 Tactical (.45 ACP)

Specifications
- Mass: Unloaded: 21.9 oz (620 g) (FNX-9); 24.4 oz (690 g) (FNX-40); 33.2 oz (940 g) (FNX-45); 33.3 oz (940 g) (FNX-45 Tac)
- Length: 7.4 inches (190 mm) (FNX-9); 7.4 inches (190 mm) (FNX-40); 7.87 inches (200 mm) (FNX-45); 8.64 inches (219 mm) (FNX-45 Tac)
- Barrel length: 4 inches (100 mm) (FNX-9); 4 inches (100 mm) (FNX-40); 4.5 inches (110 mm) (FNX-45); 5.3 inches (130 mm) (FNX-45 Tac)
- Width: 1.55 inches (39 mm) (FNX-9); 1.55 inches (39 mm) (FNX-40); 1.58 inches (40 mm) (FNX-45); 1.58 inches (40 mm) (FNX-45 Tac)
- Height: 5.45 inches (138 mm) (FNX-9); 5.45 inches (138 mm) (FNX-40); 6.33 inches (161 mm) (FNX-45); 6.7 inches (170 mm) (FNX-45 Tac)
- Cartridge: 9×19mm Parabellum; .40 S&W; .45 ACP
- Action: Mechanically locked, recoil operated (DA/SA)
- Feed system: Detachable box magazine; capacities: 17 rounds (FNX-9); 14 rounds (FNX-40); 15 rounds (FNX-45); 15 rounds (FNX-45 Tac); 10 rounds (all models, for jurisdictions with magazine capacity restrictions)
- Sights: 3-dot white, fixed combat (Standard); Enhanced high-profile combat night sights (FNX-45 Tac)

The FN FNX pistol is a series of semi-automatic, polymer-framed pistols manufactured in Columbia, South Carolina, by FN America (branded FNH USA), a division of Fabrique Nationale d'Herstal.

== History ==
The FNX was introduced in 2009 as the successor to the FN FNP.

== Design ==
=== Operation ===
The FNX is a short recoil operated pistol, much like many other centerfire pistols on the market. Its difference lies in the distance the barrel and the slide travel prior to the barrel dropping and unlocking.

The FNX barrel and slide travel up to twice the distance of some other semiautomatic pistols before separating. This helps to reduce the felt recoil of the pistol by allowing the spring to absorb more momentum from both the barrel and the slide.

The pistol is hammer fired, as opposed to striker fired; this allows the pistol to be fired in either single action or double action mode. Its safety mechanism is based on the safety found on a M1911. It is possible to cock the hammer to the rear and engage the safety simultaneously to carry the weapon "cocked and locked". The safety lever acts as a decocker when pushed downward.

Field stripping is accomplished by locking the slide to the rear, rotating the takedown lever clockwise ninety degrees and releasing the slide stop while carefully allowing the slide to be pushed forward out of the frame. The barrel and recoil spring then separate from the slide to complete the disassembly procedure.

All FNX pistols (save some law enforcement models that are decock only) include ambidextrous safety/decocking levers, magazine releases, and slide stop release levers. All variations also include a Picatinny rail, tritium night sights, and a loaded chamber indicator on the right side.

=== Ammunition ===
The pistol is chambered for the 9×19mm Parabellum, .40 S&W, and .45 ACP cartridges.

=== Accessories ===
New models are sold in a plastic hard case with three magazines, and two interchangeable backstraps.

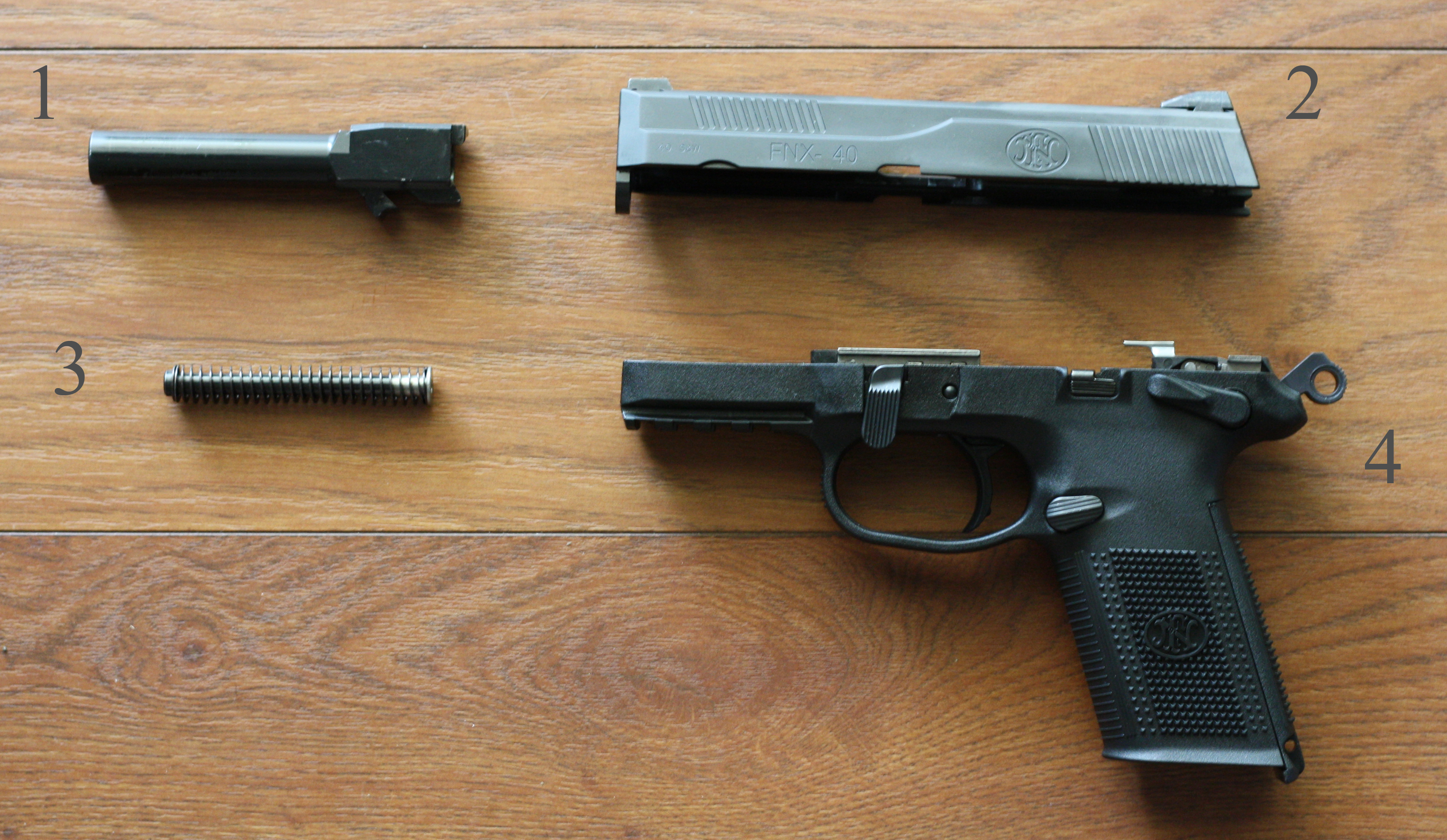
FNX-40 field stripped: 1. barrel; 2. slide; 3. recoil spring; 4. receiver.

As of 2012, new models include 4 interchangeable backstraps rather than two. One is shipped on the handgun and three extra are in the case. The backstraps are two different thicknesses and two different patterns (a cross-hatch pattern similar to the sides of the grip, and horizontal lines similar to the front of the grip).

== Variants ==
As of the beginning of October 2012, the only variants of the FNX 9 and FNX 40 pistol were purely cosmetic: both the FNX-9 and FNX-40 are available with the slide finished in matte black or stainless steel.

=== FNX 45 ===
The FNX 45 was released at the beginning of October 2012. It is currently available in Black, Stainless, and FDE (flat dark earth).

The FNX 45 has magazines that come with 12 witness holes, numbering from 4 to 15, enabling the shooter to more accurately gauge the number of rounds left.

This is in contrast to the original FNX having a hole marked 5, 10, and 14, for the FNX 40, or 5, 10, 15, 17 for the FNX 9.

=== FNX Tactical ===
The FNX Tactical was released in .45 ACP shortly after the initial production runs of the FNX 45. It features a threaded barrel, Suppressor height tritium night sights "rear yellow front green" and a milled slide to install optics like a micro red dot sight. Is available in flat dark earth (FDE) and black color options.

== Users ==
- United States
  - Law enforcement in the United States

== See also ==
- FN 503
- FN 502
- FN 509
- FN 510
- FN 545
- FN FNS
- FN FNP
- FN HiPer
- FN Five-seveN
- Browning Hi-Power
- List of semi-automatic pistols
