= Fnar =

Fnar or FNAR may refer to:

- FNAR, a French terrorist group
- The FN FNAR rifle
