= FN FNS =

- Type: Semi-automatic pistol
- Place of origin: United States

Production history
- Designed: 2011
- Manufacturer: FN America
- Produced: 2011–2018
- Variants: See Variants: FNS-9 (9×19mm); FNS-9 Long Slide (9×19mm); FNS-9 Compact (9×19mm); FNS-40 (.40 S&W); FNS-40 Long Slide (.40 S&W); FNS-40 Compact (.40 S&W)

Specifications
- Mass: 25.2 oz (710 g) (FNS-9); 26.5 oz (750 g) (FNS-9 Long Slide); 23.4 oz (660 g) (FNS-9 Compact); 27.5 oz (780 g) (FNS-40); 29.7 oz (840 g) (FNS-40 Long Slide); 25.8 oz (730 g) (FNS-40 Compact)
- Length: 7.25 in (184 mm) (FNS-9); 6.7 in (170 mm) (FNS-9 Compact); 7.25 in (184 mm) (FNS-40)
- Barrel length: 4 in (102 mm) (FNS-9); 3.6 in (91 mm) (FNS-9 Compact); 4 in (102 mm) (FNS-40)
- Width: 1.55 in (39 mm) (FNS-9); 1.35 in (34 mm) (FNS-9 Compact); 1.55 in (39 mm) (FNS-40)
- Height: 5.5 in (140 mm) (FNS-9); 5.2 in (130 mm) (FNS-9 Compact); 5.5 in (140 mm) (FNS-40)
- Cartridge: 9×19mm Parabellum; .40 S&W
- Barrels: 1 in 10" RH Twist (FNS-9); 1 in 16" RH Twist (FNS-40)
- Action: Short recoil operated, locked breech. tilting barrel
- Feed system: Detachable box magazine; capacities: 17 rounds (FNS-9); 12 rounds (FNS-9 Compact); 14 rounds (FNS-40)
- Sights: Three-dot combat sights (standard or night)

The FN FNS pistol is a series of striker-fired semi-automatic, polymer-framed pistols manufactured in Fredericksburg, Virginia, by FN America, a division of Fabrique Nationale Herstal.

== Design ==
The FNS pistol is based on the FN FNX.

The FNS has similar ergonomics to the FNX but introduces a double-action, striker-fired functionality.

The FNS series of the pistols all include ambidextrous magazine releases, and slide stop release levers.

=== Safety ===
The FNS has four standard safety features:

1. A trigger safety, similar to that seen on a Glock, which prevents the weapon from discharging without pressure on the trigger.
2. A firing pin safety which prevents the striker from hitting the primer without the trigger being pulled.
3. A drop safety which prevents the sear from rotating to release the striker unless the trigger is pulled.
4. An out-of-battery safety which prevents the sear from releasing the striker if the slide is not fully forward.

As a fifth safety feature, the FNS pistols can also have an optional manual safety.

=== Operation ===
Like other FN pistols, the FNS is a short-recoil-operated pistol. It is a pre-set striker fired semi-automatic pistol, meaning the trigger system is of the hammerless short double-action-only type. The trigger pull is between 25 N (5.6 lb_{f}) and 35 N (7.9 lb_{f}).

All variations also include a hammer-forged stainless steel barrel, Picatinny rail, fixed three-dot combat sights (standard or night sights), and a loaded chamber indicator on the right side.

=== Ammunition ===
The pistol is chambered for the 9×19mm Parabellum and .40 S&W cartridges.

== Variants ==
All versions are available in two finishes: a standard black finish featuring a dark colored/nitrided slide and matte black frame or a two-tone finish featuring a silver colored stainless steel slide and matte black frame.

At least one variant, the FNS-9C (compact) is available in solid dark earth coloration.

=== Long slide version ===
Introduced in 2012 designed in partnership with the Baltimore County Police Department specifically for the department.

==== FNS-9LS ====
Long slide version of the FNS-9.

==== FNS-40LS ====
Long slide version of the FNS-40.

=== Compact versions ===
Introduced in 2015. The compact version comes with two short magazines. One has a "pinkie rest" baseplate while the other has a flat baseplate. They can also use full size magazines with the addition of a removable grip sleeve.

==== FNS-9C ====
Compact version of the FNS-9. Equipped with 12-round magazines.

==== FNS-40C ====
Compact version of the FNS-40. Equipped with 12-round magazines.

A compact version, known as the FNS-9C and FNS-40C, was introduced in 2015. Magazine capacity for the 9mm version is 12 rounds and for the .40 S&W version is 10 rounds.

=== FN 509 ===
A full size 9mm pre-loaded striker pistol, known as the FN 509, was introduced in early 2016 with it being part of the XM17 Modular Handgun System competition. It was released for public sale in 2017.

It is fully ambidextrous and comes in two versions, one version having manual safety and another without it. It also comes with a Picatinny rail for various attachments.

== Malfunction issues ==
In 2015, officer Richard Vankeuren, a 20-year veteran of the Arizona Department of Public Safety, bumped his holstered FN FNS-40 into a bag he was carrying and the weapon went off, shooting him in the leg. The investigation concluded that a part of the bag had been tangled in the trigger, causing the firearm to go off.

However, in 2018, the state began testing the weapons further. The tests concluded that the pistols were capable of firing with the slide not fully in battery, and also that they could discharge if tapped.

The pistols were even observed to fire upon the simple impact resulting from re-holstering. This was the result of the trigger not resetting properly and the safeties failing to engage.

That same year, the Baltimore County Police Department claimed that they had encountered their own problems with their own FNS-40-L pistols firing when bumped.

The Baltimore police also claimed that they had encountered three separate incidents of the roll pin in the frame breaking, causing the trigger to completely fall out of the firearm.

The Arizona Department of Public Safety shared their testing results with the Baltimore County Police. On October 30, 2018, Baltimore County Police Chief Terrence Sheridan issued an Emergency Justification for a Replacement Service Weapon.

FN immediately addressed this by replacing the striker with a newer, improved design in each FNS-40 for both the Arizona DPS and the BCPD, at no cost to either agency.

FN also posted a Service Bulletin to the public with an offer of a free striker upgrade for those who wished to send their pistol in. FN also said that the malfunctions had only been observed in a lab environment, and that the malfunctions can only be replicated in FNS pistols manufactured before February 12, 2017.

FN did, however, maintain that the FNS design was thoroughly tested and that the situations that result in the misfires were unique and unlikely, and therefore did not initiate a recall. FN also claimed that the trigger pin is a part that requires periodic maintenance, and that in all three cases, the firearm was quickly reassembled.

When the dust settled, both the Arizona DPS and the BCoPD made the decision to replace their FNS designs. Both the Arizona DPS and the BCoPD went from the .40-caliber FNS-40 to the 9mm Glock 17.

However, according to Arizona DPS spokesman Bart Graves and state trooper Kameron Lee, the decision to switch from the FNS to the Glock was made not because the department was unhappy with the pistols, but because FN had informed them that the company planned to discontinue the FNS that same year. Officer Lee claimed,

"We found an issue, FN fixed it, no guns we are carrying are faulty".

Indeed, in 2019, FN discontinued the FNS in favor of the improved FN 509. However, FN will still honor the FNS striker replacement, regardless of if the owner of the firearm is its original owner.

== Users ==
- United States
  - FNS-40-L
    - Baltimore County Police Department
      - From 2013 to 2019
  - Arizona Department of Public Safety
    - From 2015 until 2019

== See also ==
- FN 503
- FN 502
- FN 509
- FN 510
- FN 545
- FN FNX
- FN FNP
- FN HiPer
- FN Five-seveN
- Browning Hi-Power
- List of semi-automatic pistols
