= FN 503 =

Polymer frame semi-automatic handgun

- Type: Semi-automatic pistol
- Place of origin: United States

Production history
- Designed: c. 2019
- Manufacturer: FN America
- Unit cost: $549 (MSRP)
- Produced: 2020–2023

Specifications
- Mass: 21 oz (600 g)
- Length: 5.9 in (150 mm)
- Barrel length: 3.1 in (79 mm)
- Width: 1.1 in (28 mm)
- Height: 4.6 in (120 mm)
- Cartridge: 9×19mm Parabellum
- Action: Striker-fired
- Rate of fire: Semi-automatic
- Feed system: Box magazine
- Sights: Fixed 3-dot iron sights

The FN 503 is a polymer frame striker-fired subcompact semi-automatic pistol manufactured in Columbia, South Carolina, by FN America, a division of FN Herstal.

== History ==
Introduced in March 2020, the FN 503 is chambered in 9×19mm Parabellum and is intended for concealed carry.

As of August 2023, the FN 503 was discontinued.

== Features ==
The FN 503 is a striker-fired handgun with a stainless steel slide with the "design, performance and reliability standards" of the FN 509.

Subcompact in size, its overall length is 5.9 inches (150 mm) with a barrel length of 3.1 inches (79 mm) and a width of 1.1 inches (28 mm).

The three-dot iron sights are low-profile, while trigger pull averages 5 pounds-force (22 N).

Magazines are either 6-round with a pinky extension or 8-round with a grip sleeve.

== See also ==
- FN FNS
- FN FNX
- FN FNP
- FN 509
- FN 502
- FN 510
- FN 545
- FN HiPer
- FN Five-seveN
- Browning Hi-Power
