= FN Barracuda =

Barracuda
- Type: Revolver
- Place of origin: Belgium/Spain

Production history
- Designer: Astra-Unceta y Cia SA
- Designed: 1970s
- Manufacturer: Astra-Unceta y Cia SA for Fabrique Nationale
- Produced: 1974–c. 1989

Specifications
- Mass: 1,050 g (37.0 oz) (unloaded)
- Length: 211 mm (8.3 in)
- Barrel length: 76 mm (3.0 in)
- Cartridge: 9×19mm Parabellum; .357 Magnum; .38 Special
- Action: Double Action Revolver
- Feed system: 6-round cylinder
- Sights: Fixed iron sights

The FN Barracuda is a double-action multi-caliber revolver designed by and built by Astra-Unceta y Cia SA to Fabrique Nationale's specifications. It can be switched between three calibers (9×19mm Parabellum, .38 Special and .357 Magnum) by changing cylinder parts. FN decided to enter the revolver market, aiming to satisfy law enforcement customers on both sides of the Atlantic, and this gun represented their only attempt at doing so, in collaboration with Astra. Production stopped around 1989 after poor sales. The revolver is generally thought to be well-made, but it targeted a diminishing revolver market for law enforcement.

== Design details ==
Fairly standard in design, with respect to other double action / single action (DA/SA) heavy frame revolvers, the fundamental design difference between the FN Barracuda and other brands is the rapidly interchangeable cylinder, allowing the user to easily switch between 9×19mm Parabellum, .38 Special, and .357 Magnum calibers. The gun has a pinned barrel, five-screwed frame assembly, and an internal coil hammer spring that can be adjusted for trigger pull weight, among other details. In factory settings, the trigger pull for double action configuration, is 11 pounds-force (49 N), and is 4.84 pounds-force (21.5 N) in single action configuration. Barrel length is 3 inches (76 mm), which is shorter than the typical revolvers of the era, which were typically 4 inches (100 mm), but longer than a snub-nosed revolver.

== Collectability ==
Prices vary strongly based on the availability of the various cylinders and the condition of the revolver. It has been imported to the US, and previous sellers have sold imported guns at $275, but auction prices for a complete set in good condition will reach close to $600.
