= FN 502 =

Polymer frame semi-automatic handgun

- Type: Semi-automatic pistol
- Place of origin: United States

Production history
- Designed: 2021
- Manufacturer: FN America
- Unit cost: $559 (MSRP)
- Produced: 2021-Present

Specifications
- Mass: 23.7 oz (670 g)
- Length: 7.6 in (190 mm)
- Barrel length: 4.6 in (120 mm)
- Width: 1.4 in (36 mm)
- Height: 5.8 in (150 mm)
- Cartridge: .22 Long Rifle
- Action: Single-action, Hammer-fired
- Rate of fire: Semi-automatic
- Feed system: 10- or 15-round Box magazine
- Sights: Fixed 3-dot iron sights

The FN 502 is a polymer frame single-action hammer-fired semi-automatic pistol manufactured in Columbia, South Carolina, by FN America, a division of FN Herstal.

== History ==
Introduced in September 2021, the FN 502 is chambered in .22 Long Rifle and is intended for target shooting.

== Design ==
The FN 502 is based on the FN 509 design.

The FN 502 is FN‘s first semi-automatic rimfire pistol as well as the first rimfire pistol with a slide-mounted tactical red dot.

== See also ==
- FN FNS
- FN FNX
- FN FNP
- FN 509
- FN 503
- FN 510
- FN 545
- FN HiPer
- FN Five-seveN
- Browning Hi-Power
