= FN HiPer =

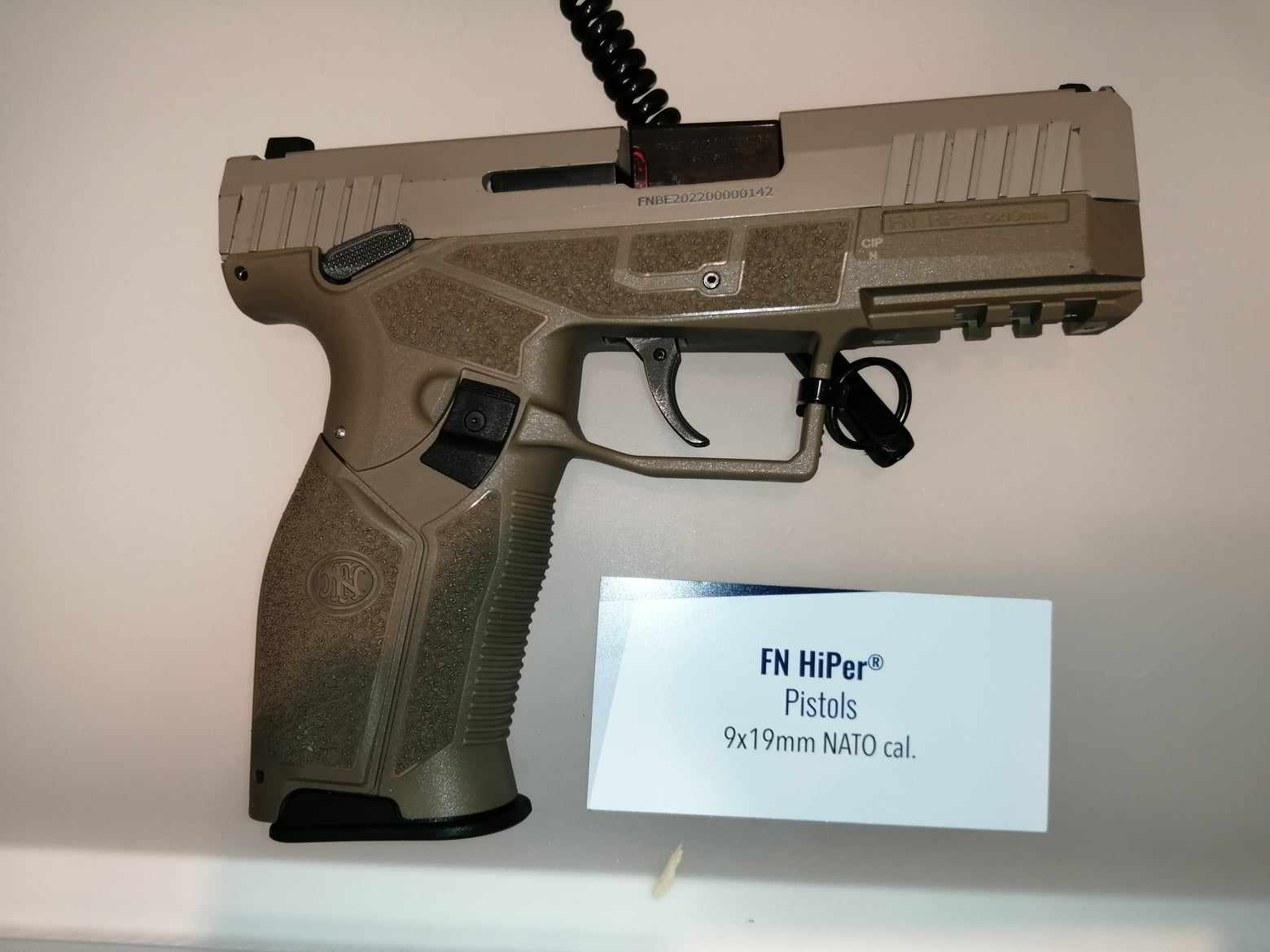
- Type: Semi-automatic pistol
- Place of origin: Belgium

Production history
- Designed: 2022
- Manufacturer: Fabrique Nationale

Specifications
- Mass: 730g
- Length: 180mm
- Barrel length: 100mm
- Cartridge: 9×19mm Parabellum
- Caliber: 9mm
- Action: Short recoil operated tilting barrel
- Rate of fire: Semi-automatic
- Feed system: Detachable 15 round box magazine

The FN HiPer is a semi-automatic pistol manufactured by FN Herstal exclusively for Armed Forces/Paramilitary/LE sales.

== Overview ==
The FN HiPer is a semi-automatic striker fired pistol.

The weapon is chambered in 9×19mm NATO and fed from a 15-round magazine.

The FN HiPer has improved ergonomics for ambidextrous handling and accuracy.

== See also ==
- FN 503
- FN 502
- FN 509
- FN 510
- FN 545
- FN FNS
- FN FNP
- FN FNX
- FN Five-seveN
- Browning Hi-Power
- List of semi-automatic pistols
- List of pistols
