= FN 303 P =

- Type: Less-lethal pistol
- Place of origin: Belgium

Production history
- Manufacturer: FN Herstal
- Produced: 2011 - present

Specifications
- Mass: 1.57 kg (3.46 lb)
- Length: 288 mm (11.3 in)
- Barrel length: 190.5 mm (7.5 in)
- Width: 50.8 mm (2.0 in)
- Height: 203.2 mm (8.0 in)
- Caliber: 17.3 mm (0.68 in)
- Action: Compressed gas
- Effective firing range: 25 m (27 yd)
- Feed system: 7-round detachable box magazine
- Sights: Fixed, open, three white dot

The FN 303 P is a semi-automatic less-lethal pistol designed and manufactured by Fabrique Nationale de Herstal. It uses the same .68 Less-lethal cartridge as the FN 303, the less-lethal riot gun by FN Herstal.

== Overview ==
The FN 303 P is the pistol version of the FN 303, and is intended for use by police and military forces for riot control. It uses the 8.5 gram, .68 caliber less-lethal cartridges by FN. The projectiles utilize a fin-stabilized polystyrene body and a non-toxic bismuth forward payload to provide more accuracy and greater effective range. There are currently five different factory standard types of the projectile: Clear impact (training), washable paint, indelible paint, PAVA/OC Powder and Inert powder.

== History ==
The FN 303 P is based on the FN 303 riot gun, and was first shown at the 2010 SHOT Show.
