= FN FNP =

Fabrique Nationale Herstal FNP
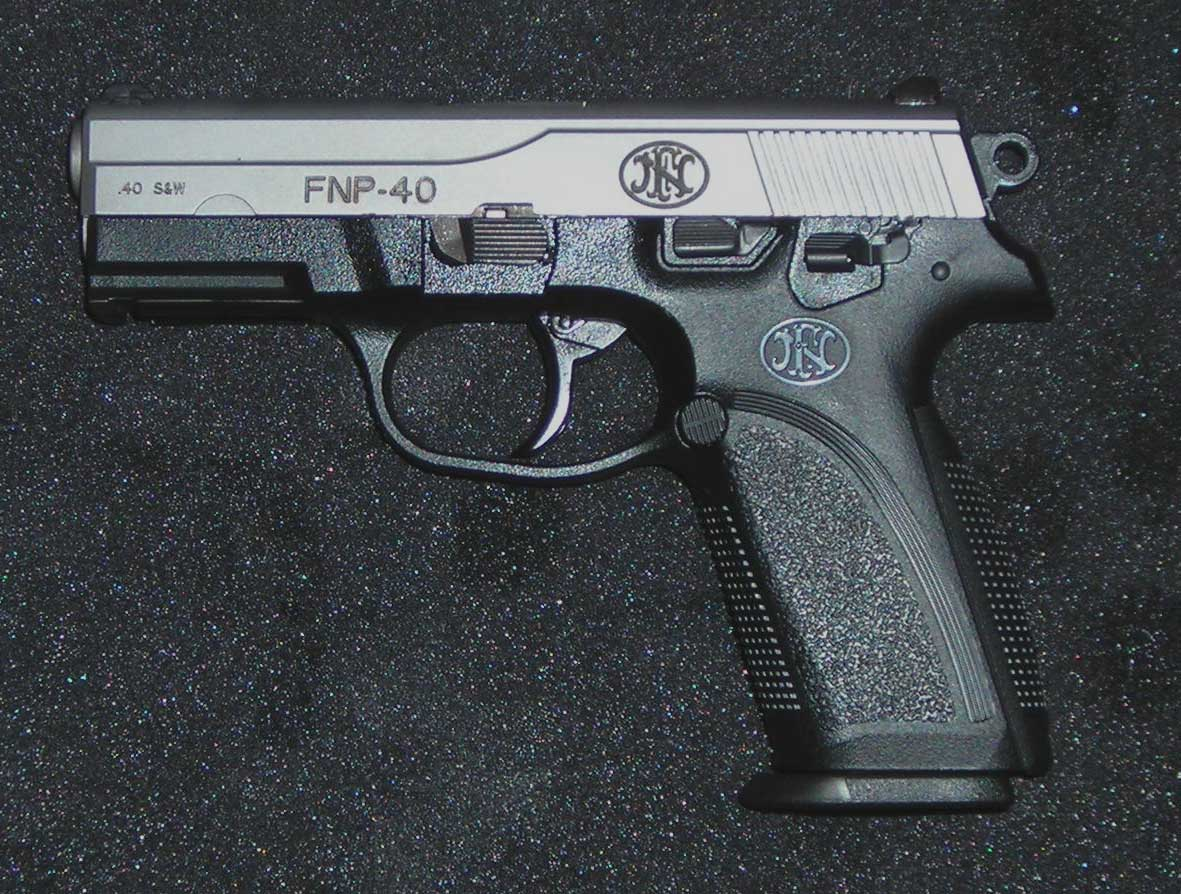
- FNP-40 with stainless steel slide
- Type: Semi-automatic pistol
- Place of origin: United States; Belgium

Service history
- Used by: See Users

Production history
- Designer: FN Herstal
- Manufacturer: FNH USA
- Produced: 2006–2011
- Variants: See Variants: FNP-9 (9×19mm Parabellum); FNP-9M (9×19mm Parabellum); FNP-40 (.40 S&W); FNP-45 (.45 ACP); FNP-357 (.357 SIG)

Specifications
- Mass: Unloaded: 24.7 oz (700 g) (FNP-9); 24.8 oz (703 g) (FNP-9M); 24.7 oz (700 g) (FNP-357); 26.7 oz (757 g) (FNP-40); 32.4 oz (919 g) (FNP-45)
- Length: 7.4 in (188 mm) (FNP-9); 7.06 in (179 mm) (FNP-9M); 7.4 in (188 mm) (FNP-357); 7.4 in (188 mm) (FNP-40); 7.85 in (199 mm) (FNP-45)
- Barrel length: 4 in (102 mm) (FNP-9); 3.791 in (96 mm) (FNP-9M); 4 in (102 mm) (FNP-357); 4 in (102 mm) (FNP-40); 4.5 in (114 mm) (FNP-45)
- Width: 1.55 in (39 mm) (FNP-9); 1.55 in (39 mm) (FNP-40); 1.58 in (40 mm) (FNP-45)
- Height: 5.4 in (137 mm) (FNP-9); 5.4 in (137 mm) (FNP-40); 6.33 in (161 mm) (FNP-45)
- Cartridge: 9×19mm Parabellum; .357 SIG; .40 S&W; .45 ACP
- Effective firing range: 55 yd (50 m)
- Feed system: Detachable box magazine; capacities: 16 rounds (FNP-9); 15 rounds (FNP-9M); 14 rounds (FNP-40); 15 rounds (FNP-45); 15 rounds (FNP-357); 10 rounds (all models, for jurisdictions with magazine capacity restrictions)
- Sights: 3-dot white or Tritium night sights

The FN FNP pistol is a series of semi-automatic, polymer-framed pistols manufactured in Columbia, South Carolina, by FNH USA, a division of Fabrique Nationale de Herstal.

== Design ==
=== Operation ===
The pistols of the FNP series are hammer-fired firearms utilizing a Browning cam system with an external extractor.

The trigger module is housed inside the polymer frame as an individual unit connected to the hammer.

The magazine release button is held in place by a retention pin which can be removed to allow the magazine release button to be reversed.

The trigger pull for the FNP-9 variant is generally 8 pounds-force (36 N) while in double action, and 3 to 4 pounds-force (13 to 18 N) while in single action.

All variations of the pistol include ambidextrous decocking levers and a reversible magazine release, as well as an integrated tactical accessory rail.

In addition, the FNP-45 offers an ambidextrous slide release.

Disassembly and reassembly of the handgun is relatively simple.

To disassemble the weapon, the slide is locked to the rear and the magazine is released from the weapon. The takedown lever located to the front of the frame is rotated downwards and the slide is released to allow it to slip off the frame rails. Once removed, the recoil spring is removed from its position in the barrel and the barrel is removed.

To reassemble the weapon the process is reversed with the slide being slid onto the frame rails and the takedown lever rotated up while the slide is locked to the rear.

=== Ammunition ===
The handgun is variously chambered for the 9×19mm, .40 S&W, .357 SIG and .45 ACP cartridges.

=== Construction ===
According to FNH USA, the FNP line of pistols is the only polymer-framed autoloading pistol on the market (as of its introduction) with fully replaceable frame rails; this allows the pistol to be rebuilt after extensive firing, thereby extending service life. However, Steyr M Series pistols also have this feature, and were released in 1999.

The lower frame is made of high-strength polymer, the slide is made of stainless steel.

== Variants ==
The FNP Series pistol is produced in five basic models with several different variations on each model.

Each of the five models, the FNP-45, the FNP-40, the FNP-357, the FNP-9 and the compact FNP-9M (cancelled), are offered with the following features:

- Double/single action, Double-action only, or Single-action only (cancelled)
- Stainless steel slide (matte black finish) or Stainless steel slide (matte natural finish)
- Black or Dark Earth Frame
- Standard sights or Night sights

The FNP-9 and FNP-40 have also been marketed as the Browning Pro-9 and Pro-40.

The FNP series has been replaced by the FNX pistol series.

=== FNP-45 Tactical ===
The FNP-45 Tactical was developed to be entered into the Joint Combat Pistol from late 2005 to early 2006 for a new military sidearm to replace the M9 Pistol.

The program was started in 2005 and run by USSOCOM which was a merger of two earlier programs, the army's Future Handgun System (FHS) and the Special Operations Forces Combat Pistol.

The requirements for the JCP included being chambered for caliber .45 ACP, having an integrated Picatinny rail, including day/night sights, and being capable of accepting a suppressor.

The FNP™-45 Tactical was offered with a 15-round magazine for the required .45 ACP caliber.

== Users ==
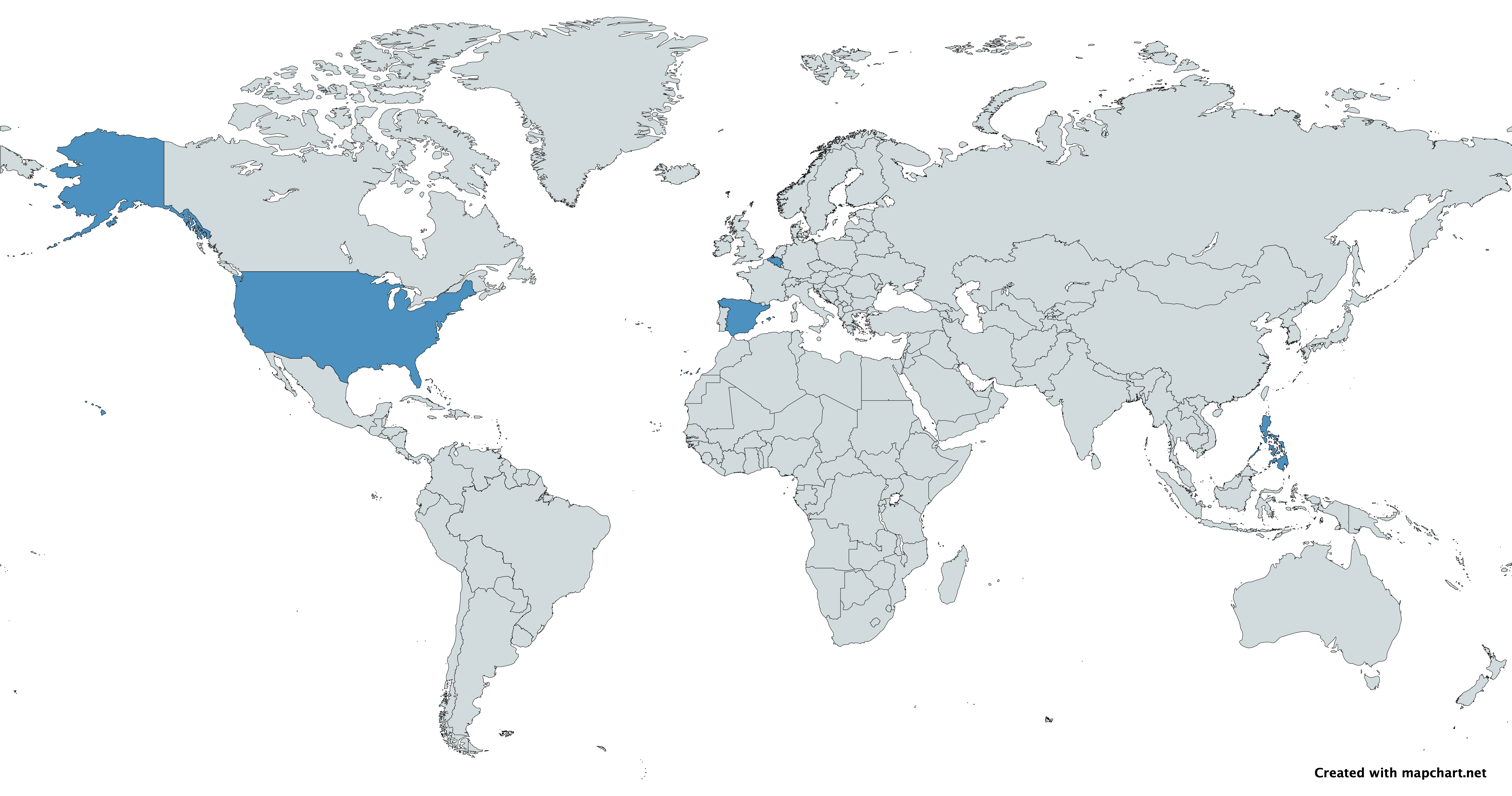
Map with FN FNP users in blue

=== Current users ===
- Belgium: The Genk police force purchased 190 FNP-9 and FNP-9M pistols in April 2005.
- Spain: Spanish Navy Marines have begun to replace old Llama M82s with FNP-9s.
- United States: A quantity of 27 FNP pistols was donated to New Roads, Louisiana Police Department in October 2009 to replace damaged guns, due to budgetary constraints.

=== Failed bids ===
- United Kingdom: 19 FNP-9s evaluated as a replacement for the Browning L9A1 pistol, lost to the Glock 17

== See also ==
- FN 503
- FN 502
- FN 509
- FN 510
- FN 545
- FN FNS
- FN FNX
- FN HiPer
- FN Five-seveN
- Browning Hi-Power
- List of semi-automatic pistols
