= FNAR =

FNAR (also known as Front National Anti Radar, Antiradar National Front or Fraction Nationaliste Armée Révolutionnaire, Armed Nationalist Revolutionary Faction) is a group that has blown up several radar speed traps in France. They have demanded from the government lower taxes, more motorist-friendly policies, an end to immigration, and 4 million euros.

On Wednesday 28 May 2008, a TATP-based homemade bomb detonated in an apartment situated in the Paris suburb of Clichy-la-Garenne, very seriously injuring the man who was assembling it. Before falling into a coma, the suspect told the firemen who were evacuating him that he was a member of the FNAR.
