= FN FNAR =

- Type: Designated marksman rifle
- Place of origin: United States

Production history
- Manufacturer: FN Herstal
- Produced: 2008–present
- Variants: FN FNAR-H (Heavy Barrel); FN FNAR-L (Light Barrel)

Specifications
- Mass: 9 lb (4.1 kg) (FNAR-L); 10 lb (4.5 kg) (FNAR-H)
- Length: 41.5 in (105 cm)
- Barrel length: 20 in (51 cm)
- Cartridge: 7.62×51mm NATO
- Action: Short-stroke gas piston
- Muzzle velocity: 2,500 ft/s (760 m/s)
- Effective firing range: 800 m (870 yd) (FNAR-L); 1,100 m (1,200 yd) (FNAR-H)
- Feed system: 5, 10, or 20 round detachable box

The FNAR is a semi-automatic designated marksman rifle first introduced to the shooting public in 2008. It is a product of the US-based subsidiary of Belgian company FN Herstal, the FN Manufacturing Co. Despite the name, the FNAR is not an "AR" type rifle. Rather, the FNAR rifle is based on the proven and quite popular Browning BAR hunting rifle (which is unrelated to the original Browning BAR M1918 rifle of World War II fame).

== Overview ==
short-stroke gas piston

The FN FNAR is a gas-operated semi-automatic rifle. The short-stroke gas piston is located below the (internally chromed) barrel, within the stock. The barrel is locked using a rotary bolt with multiple lugs. The receiver is machined from aircraft-grade 7075 T6 aluminum alloy. The polymer stock has an adjustable buttstock and pistol grip. Ammunition is fed from a detachable box magazine, with a standard capacity of 20 rounds of 7.62 mm ammunition, although 5 and 10 round magazines are available if required by local legislation. There are no iron sights installed by default; each FNAR rifle is fitted with a Picatinny rail on the top of the receiver, and three more short rails are installed at the front of the rifle stock.

The FNAR uses a two-stage non-adjustable trigger specified at between 3.25 and 5.5 pounds.

== Variants ==
The standard FN FNAR has a light fluted barrel. The heavy barreled FN FNAR-H variant weighs about a pound more. Both are out-of-the-box guaranteed to be capable of Minute of Angle accuracy. A Winchester-branded version is called the Winchester SX-AR. The standard model retains the pistol grip and comes with a heavy profile 20" match grade chrome lined barrel. Rails are a reduced length top rail for optics mounting and one short bottom rail section for sling or bi-pod mounting. It is finished in a Cerakote type Mossy Oak camo pattern. The standard 10 round SX-AR detachable box magazines are interchangeable with the 20 round FNAR magazines.
