= FN 509 =

Polymer frame semi-automatic handgun

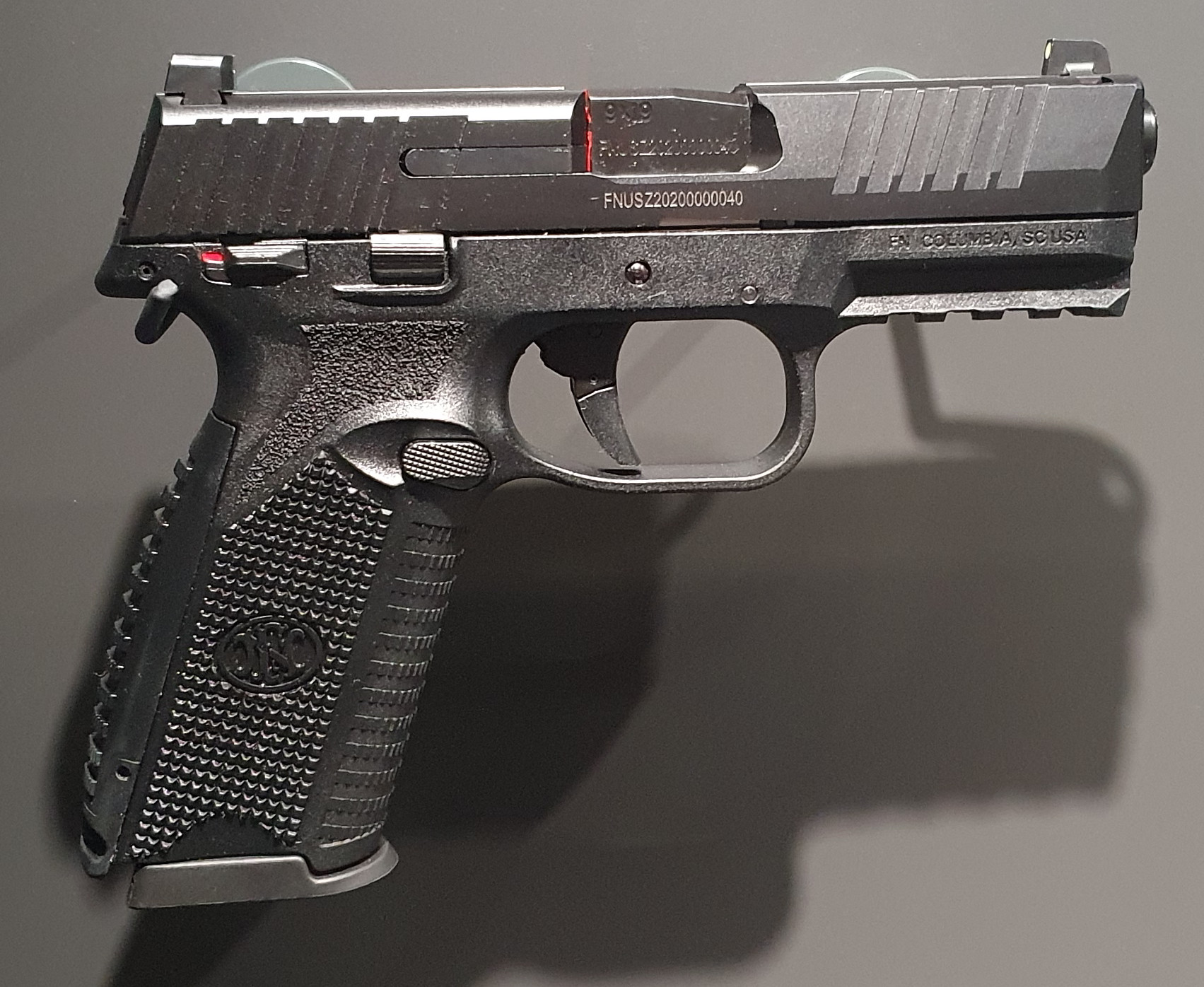
- FN 509 midsize
- Type: Semi-automatic pistol
- Place of origin: United States

Production history
- Designed: 2015
- Manufacturer: FN America
- Unit cost: $649 (MSRP)
- Produced: 2017–present
- Variants: See Variants

Specifications
- Mass: 26.9 oz (760 g)
- Length: 7.4 in (190 mm)
- Barrel length: 4.0 in (100 mm)
- Width: 1.35 in (34 mm)
- Height: 5.56 in (141 mm)
- Cartridge: 9×19mm Parabellum (509); 10mm Auto (510); .45 ACP (545)
- Action: Double action
- Feed system: Box magazine
- Sights: Fixed 3-dot (standard); Tactical and MRD (Note: MRD is an abbreviation for miniature red dot) variants accept red dot sights

The FN 509 is a polymer frame striker-fired semi-automatic pistol manufactured by FN America, a division of FN Herstal.

== History ==
As part of the XM17 Modular Handgun System competition (MHS) initiated in September 2015, FN Herstal entered a polymer-framed, striker-fired pistol, derived from the FN FNS.

After SIG Sauer won the competition in January 2017 with a modified version of the P320, FN America brought a version of their entry, now known as the FN 509, to the commercial market.

FN sought consultation from retired Delta Force operator Larry Vickers during early development of the FN 509.

FN America stated that during development and testing of the MHS entry and the FN 509, over a million rounds of ammunition were used.

== Design ==
The FN 509 is a striker-fired handgun with a stainless steel slide with a ferritic nitrocarburizing finish and a polymer frame.

Black and flat dark earth (FDE) colorings are available.

The FN 509's barrel length is 4.0 inches (100 mm) while employing a full-sized grip. The slide has serrations on both front and back, for easy slide manipulation

The FN 509 features a Picatinny rail located forward of the trigger guard. The backstrap of the grip accepts interchangeable inserts; one arched and one flat.

=== Operation ===
The FN 509 features double-action operation with magazine releases and slide locks present on both side of the gun.

Instead of a manual safety, the 509 includes an integrated trigger safety (the articulated trigger type like the FN FNS) as part of its four passive safety systems: a striker block, a drop safety, a trigger disconnect and a trigger safety lever.

=== Magazines ===
The FN 509 primarily uses 17-round magazines; 10-round magazines are available for states with a high-capacity magazine ban.

=== Ammunition ===
While the FN 509 is primarily chambered in 9×19mm Parabellum, FN Herstal also offers the model in other calibres.

=== Specifications ===
Specification	FN 509	FN 509 Tactical	FN 509 Midsize	FN 509 Midsize MRD	FN 509 Compact MRD
Barrel length	4.0 in (100 mm)	4.5 in (110 mm)	4.0 in (100 mm)		3.7 in (94 mm)
Overall length	7.4 in (190 mm)	7.9 in (200 mm)	7.4 in (190 mm)		6.8 in (170 mm)
Overall width	1.35 in (34 mm)				
Height	5.56 in (141 mm)	5.75 in (146 mm)	5.2 in (130 mm)		4.8 in (120 mm)
Weight	26.9 oz (760 g)	27.9 oz (790 g)	26.5 oz (750 g)		25.5 oz (720 g)
Magazine capacity	17-round	17-round†	15-round		12-round‡
Optics mount	No	Yes	No	Yes	Yes
Color	Black or FDE	Black or FDE	Black		Black or FDE
Reference					

For all variants, 10-round magazines are available for states that restrict capacity.
† For the Tactical variant, 24-round extended magazines also available.
‡ For the Compact MRD variant, 15-round extended magazines also available, which increase height to 5.2 in (130 mm).

== Variants ==
=== 509 ===
Aside from inert training pistol and Simunition variants, several offerings of the FN 509 have been made available:

==== Tactical ====
4.5-inch (110 mm) barrel length, 17- and 24-round magazines, available in black or FDE, threaded barrel, raised sights (to accommodate a suppressor), with low-profile optics mounting system (for a red dot sight).

==== Midsize ====
4.0-inch (100 mm) barrel length, 15-round magazines, available in black, with a midsize frame intended for concealed carry.

==== Midsize MRD ====
As above, with low-profile optics mounting system.

==== Compact MRD ====
3.7-inch (94 mm) barrel length, 12- and 15-round magazines, available in black or FDE, with low-profile optics mounting system.

=== Other variants ===
==== FN 503 ====
Introduced in March 2020, the FN 503 is the subcompact model of the FN 509.

==== FN 502 ====
Introduced in September 2021, the FN 502 is the .22 variant of the FN 509.

==== FN 510 ====
Introduced in 2023, the FN 510 is the 10mm Auto variant of the FN 509.

==== FN 545 ====
Introduced in 2023, the FN 545 is the .45 ACP variant of the FN 509.

== Users ==
- United States
  - Standard-issue sidearm (MRD-LE variant) of the Los Angeles Police Department as of 2021.
  - Standard-issue sidearm (MRD-LE variant) of the Waterbury Police Department of Waterbury, Connecticut as of 2024.

== See also ==
- FN FNS
- FN FNX
- FN FNP
- FN HiPer
- FN Five-seveN
- Browning Hi-Power
