= Coyote brown =

Earthy shade of brown

Common connotations
- military camouflage

Color coordinates
- Hex triplet: #81613C
- sRGB^{B} (r, g, b): (129, 97, 60)
- HSV (h, s, v): (32°, 53%, 51%)
- CIELCh_{uv} (L, C, h): (44, 37, 49°)
- Source: Color Codes
- ISCC–NBS descriptor: Moderate yellowish brown
- B: Normalized to [0–255] (byte)

Some shades of Coyote brown

Coyote brown, also known as nutria brown, is a color often used in military camouflage. It is a dull yellowish brown.

== See also ==
- List of colors
- MARPAT
- MultiCam
