= Double action =

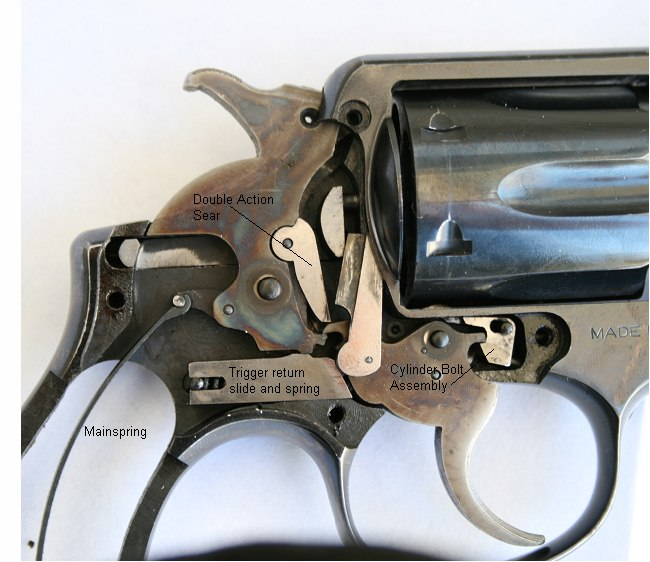
A M&P 1905 forth change lockwork with annotations

Double action (or double-action) refers to one of two systems in firearms where the trigger both cocks and releases the hammer.

- Double-action only (DAO) firearms trigger: The trigger both cocks and releases the hammer. There is no single-action function and the hammer will return to its decocked position after each shot.
  - Double Action Kellerman (DAK): A variant of traditional double-action used on certain SIG Sauer semi-automatic pistols. DAK triggers have a long stroke with 29 N (6.5 lb_{f}) pull. However, if a user shooting under stress short-strokes the trigger by only releasing it halfway, the trigger will reset, but with a 38 N (8.5 lb_{f}) pull. This temporary increased trigger pull is intended to prevent negligent discharges.
- Double-action – firearms trigger: Pressing the trigger 1) cocks, and 2) drops the hammer. The hammer can also be cocked to fire in single-action (SA) mode.
  - With a DA revolver, the hammer can be cocked first (single action), or the trigger can be pulled and it will cock and release the hammer (double action). Once the gun has fired, the hammer stays in the decocked position until the hammer is re-cocked (single action), or the trigger is pulled again (double action).
  - With a DA semi-automatic pistol, the initial trigger pull will cock and release the hammer (double action). The blowback from the firing mechanism automatically re-cocks the hammer after the gun is fired, such that each subsequent shot only requires the hammer to be released (single action). A decocker, if present on the pistol, can be used to return the hammer to its decocked position to prevent negligent discharges.
