= Safety (firearms) =

Feature on firearms to prevent accidental discharge

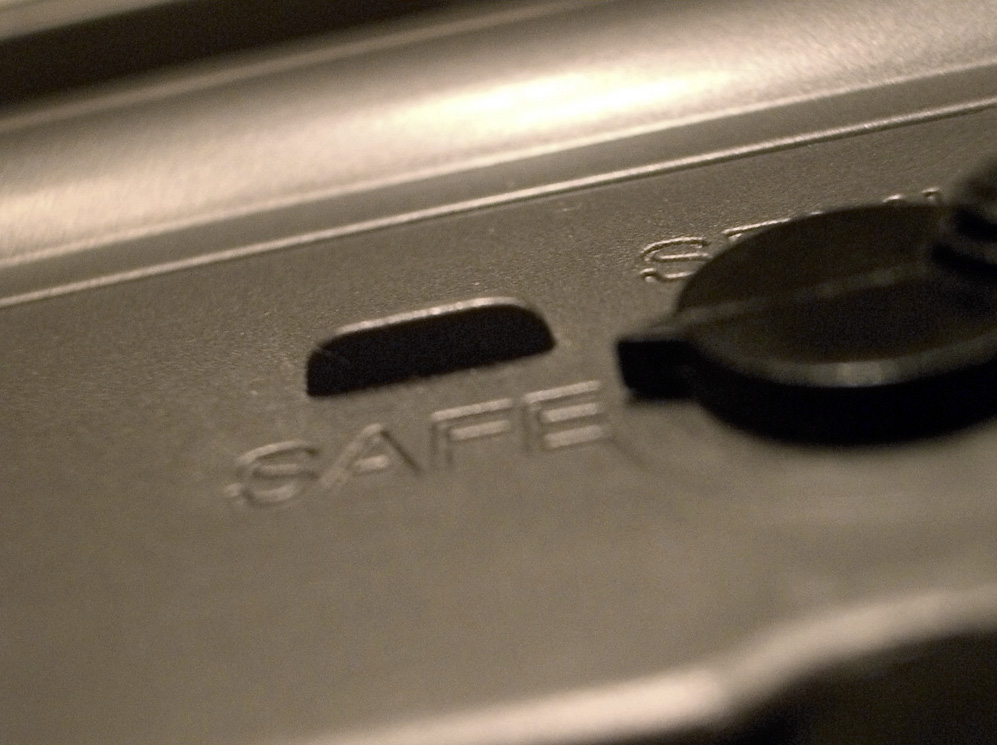
Close-up shot of a safety of an M16A2 rifle

In firearms, a safety or safety catch is a mechanism used to help prevent the accidental discharge of a firearm, helping to ensure safer handling.

Safeties can generally be categorized as either internal safeties (which typically do not receive input from the user) and external safeties (which the user may manipulate manually, for example, switching a lever from "safe" to "fire"). Sometimes these are called "passive" and "active" safeties (or "automatic" and "manual"), respectively. External safeties typically work by preventing the trigger from being pulled or preventing the firing pin from striking the cartridge.

Firearms which allow the user to select various fire modes may have separate controls for safety and for mode selection (e.g. Thompson submachine gun) or may have the safety integrated with the mode selector as a fire selector with positions for safe, semi-automatic, and fully automatic fire (e.g. M16 rifle).

Some firearms manufactured after the late 1990s and early 2000s include a mandatory integral locking mechanisms that must be deactivated by a unique key before the gun can be fired. These integral locking mechanisms are intended as child-safety devices during unattended storage of the firearm—not as safety mechanisms while carrying. Other devices in this category are trigger locks, bore locks, and gun safes.

== Typical safeties ==
=== Manual safety ===
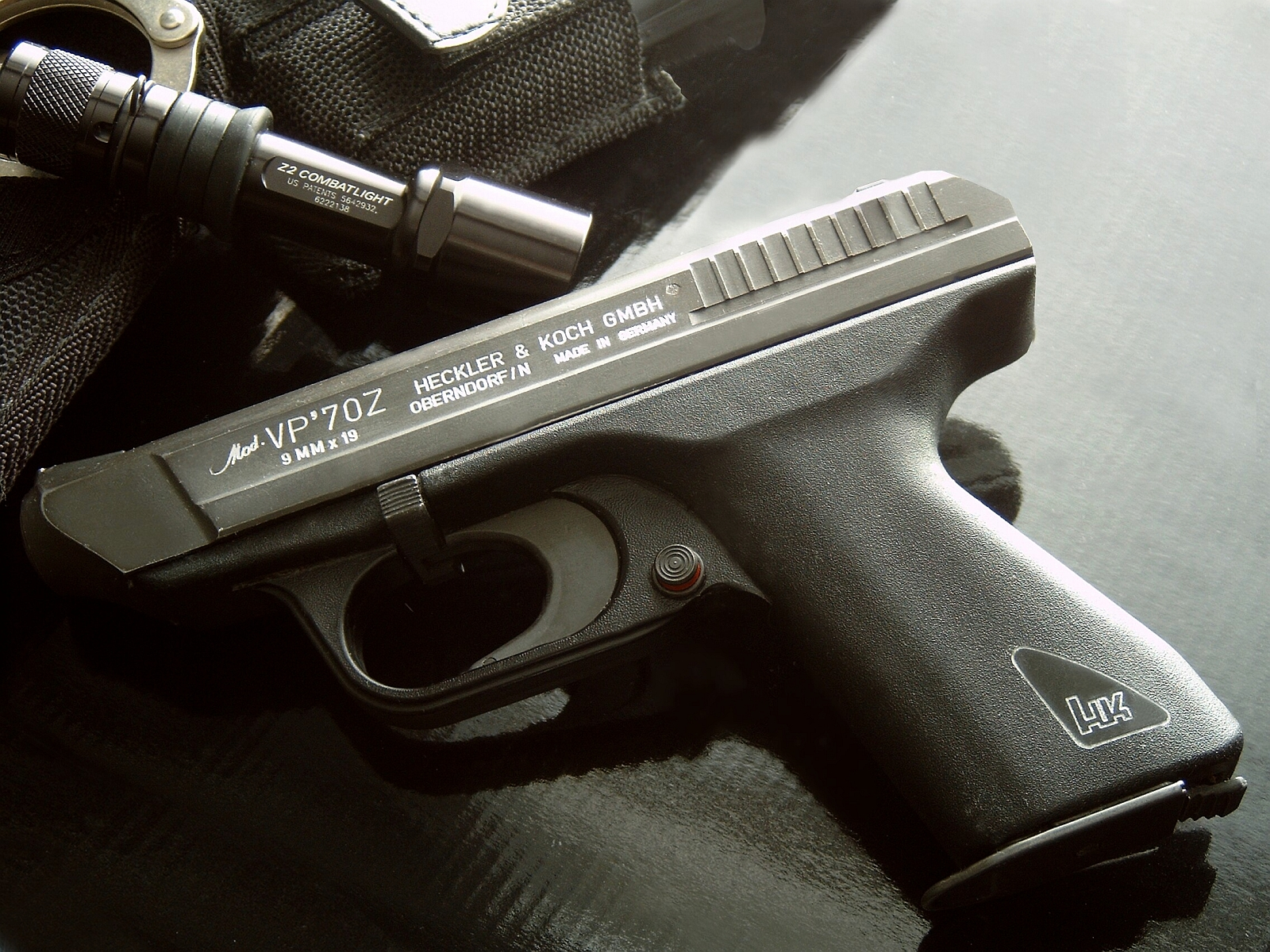
Heckler & Koch VP70 pistol with a push-button safety (cross bolt trigger block) at the back of the trigger guard

The most common form of safety mechanism is a switch, button or lever that when set to the "safe" position, prevents the firing of a firearm. Manual safeties are as varied as the designs of firearms themselves, but the two most common mechanisms are a block or latch that prevents the trigger and/or firing mechanism from moving, and a device that disconnects the trigger from the firing mechanism of the firearm. Other designs may block the hammer or striker from forward movement or act as a block to prevent them from contacting the firing pin. In addition some manual safeties such as the Ruger SR9 pictured lock the pistol's slide closed when in Safe position whereas, for example, S&W M&P manual safeties do not lock the slide closed. The benefit of these design variances have not been clearly stated or pointed out by manufacturers, however, in the Ruger SR example, a chambered round cannot be ejected to empty the gun with the manual safety in the safe position. The safety must be OFF to clear the weapon. In the M&P design, the slide can be manually actuated and a chambered round ejected with the manual safety in safe position. One possible benefit of the slide-safety lock may be that, upon holstering, the slide cannot be snagged and hung up out of battery. Manual Safeties are the oldest forms of "active" safety mechanism and are widely used; however, many "double-action" firearms such as revolvers do not have manual safeties as the longer, harder trigger pull to cock and fire double-action provides adequate trigger safety, while keeping the firearm in a more ready state.

=== Grip safety ===
A grip safety is a lever or other device situated on the grip of a firearm which must be actuated by the operator's hand, as a natural consequence of holding the firearm in a firing position, in order for the firearm to fire. It is usually similar to a manual safety in its function, but is momentary; the safety is deactivated only while the shooter maintains their hold on the grip, and is reactivated immediately once the shooter releases it. The M1911 design is a popular example of a handgun with a grip safety, while the Uzi submachine gun and the HS2000 (marketed in the US as the Springfield Armory XD) and its descendants are other notable examples of this type of safety.

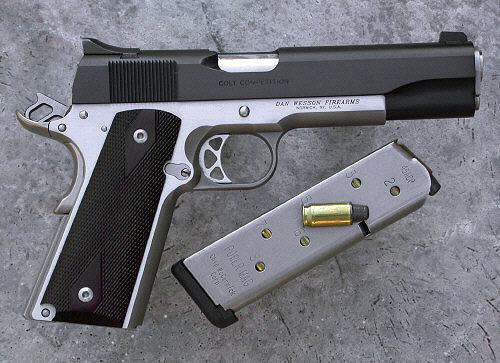
Dan Wesson 1911-style Patriot pistol with a grip safety lever protruding at the back of the grip

A related grip-type safety is the decocking grip found on some H&K pistols like the P7 Series. The firearm is cocked and ready to fire only when the front of the grip is squeezed by the operator. When the grip is released, the firearm is decocked, and the single-action trigger will not cock the firearm, therefore it will not fire unless the grip is squeezed and the trigger pulled. Alternatively, the trigger can first be pulled and then it will fire when the grip is subsequently squeezed. Finally, if both the grip is squeezed and the trigger pulled simultaneously, the pistol will fire.

Another, unusual variant was found in the Ortgies semi-automatic pistols. To disengage the safety, a user would squeeze a lever until flush with the rear of the grip. The lever then would latch in the disengaged position until the user released it again by pressing a button under the slide, whereupon tension from the striker spring would push it back to the engaged position. Thus engaging the safety also relieved some tension in the striker spring. As the Ortgies is a pocket pistol meant for personal defense, this feature eliminates the problem of failing to disengage the safety when one needs to shoot. Gripping the pistol tightly is all it takes to disengage the safety.

=== Decocker ===
Most traditional semi-automatic double-action/single action (DA/SA) pistols are designed to be carried with the hammer down (uncocked) on a chambered round, with or without a manual safety engaged. The pistol is considered safe in this state as the "double-action" pull that both cocks and fires the firearm is both longer and heavier than the "single-action" pull that simply releases the cocked hammer, and thus an inadvertent trigger pull is less likely.

However, the act of cycling the action on such a firearm (as a natural consequence of discharging the firearm, or to chamber the first round) will leave the hammer cocked in single-action mode. To return the pistol to its safe state, it is necessary to uncock (decock) the hammer, usually by holding the hammer spur, carefully pulling the trigger, and then slowly lowering the hammer on the firing pin.

Hammer-fired semi-auto pistols have a beaver tail to protect the shooter's hand from the slide, which makes it more difficult to securely and firmly grasp the hammer with the thumb than a double action/single action revolver, thus making an accidental discharge more likely. Striker-fired pistols, on the other hand, do not have a hammer, so the only way to return the trigger to its longer pull (safer) state is by means of a decocking or detensioning lever which actually releases the tension in the striker's spring without allowing firing pin full travel and internal safeties disengagement (such as the firing pin block which these types of firearms are generally fitted with).

When a handgun is fitted with a "decocking" lever, there is no need to pull the trigger while holding the lever like in a revolver. The actual process of "decocking" the gun is done by simply flipping the decocking lever to its "decocked" position with the fingers away from the trigger.

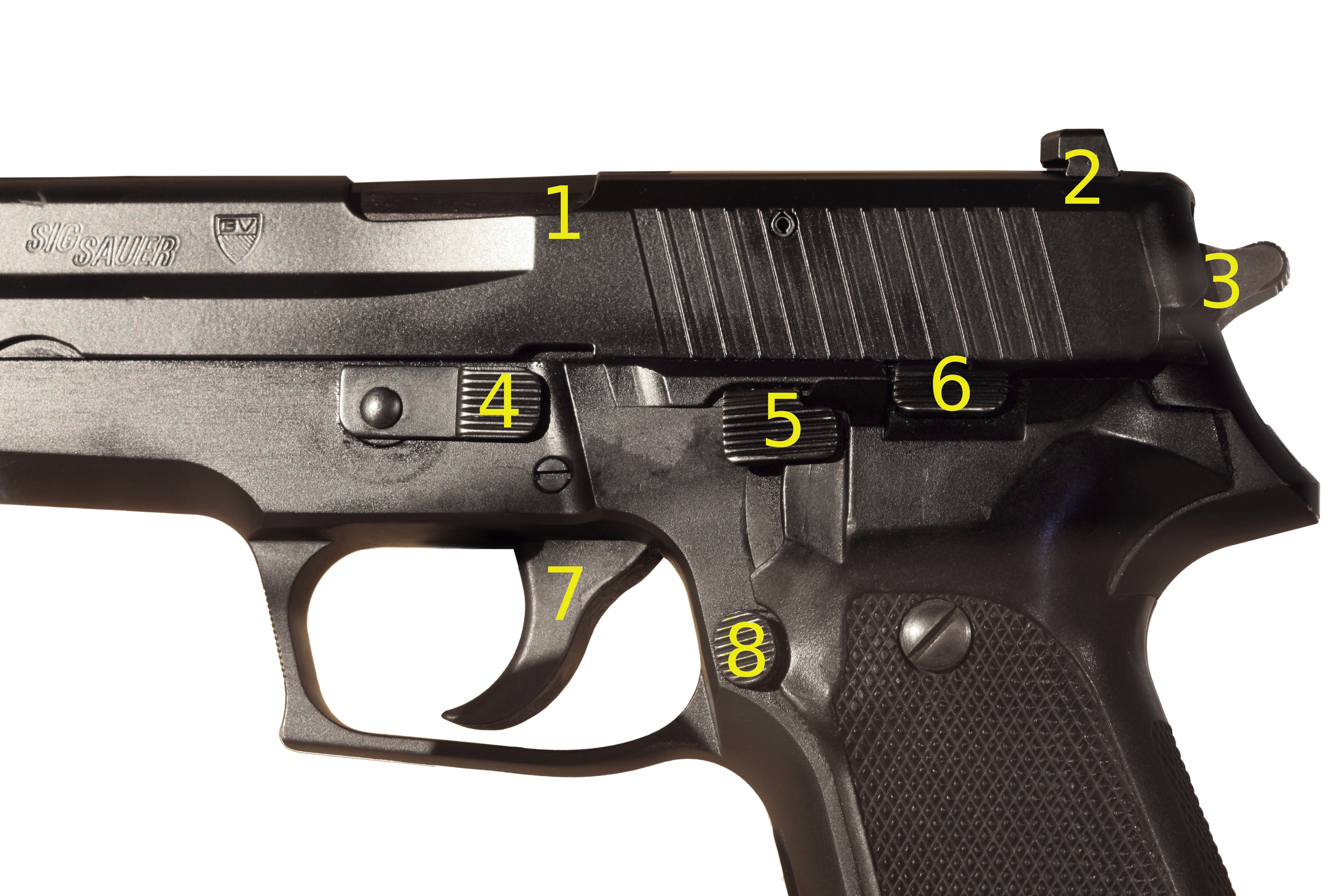
SIG Sauer P226 controls and parts: 1. Ejection port 2. Rear sight 3. Hammer, 4. Takedown lever 5. Decocker 6. Slide stop 7. Trigger 8. Magazine release

A decocker or manual decocking lever allows the hammer to be dropped on a live cartridge without risk of discharging it, usually by blocking the hammer or retracting or covering the firing pin before releasing the sear. That eliminates the need to pull the trigger or to control the fall of the hammer; however, since all mechanisms can fail, it is still necessary to keep the muzzle of the gun pointed in a safe direction while decocking.

A decock/safety is a combination manual safety switch and decocking lever. Two popular variants exist. In the "three-way" system, made popular by Heckler & Koch pistols, the handler may decock the firearm by pushing down on the safety lever from the "Fire" setting, or engage the safety (even on a cocked firearm) by pushing the lever upwards. A simpler "two-way" system was popularized by the Walther PP and is also commonly seen on the Beretta 92: engaging the safety also decocks the firearm.

The SIG Sauer line of pistols, such as the SIG P226, frequently feature decocking levers. The earliest use of a single-action decocker was the Vis wz. 35 "Radom" redesign in 1932 to enable horsemen to safely holster their firearm with one hand. The earliest use of a cocking/decocking lever is the Sauer 38H from 1938. Ruger until 2007 manufactured "decock-only" variants of its P-series pistols, and the "two-way" decocking safety has been available on these pistols since their introduction.

=== Hammer/striker cocker ===
A device on handguns with single-action triggers such as the H&K P7 and the Shevchenko PSh used as an alternative to double-action triggers to cock the hammer/striker has been used as a safety grip.

=== Drop safety ===
Many jurisdictions such as the state of California require some form of "drop safety" on all new firearms, which are usually passive safeties designed to reduce the chance of a firearm accidentally discharging when dropped or roughly handled. Such safeties generally provide an obstacle to operation of the firing mechanism that is only removed when the trigger is pulled, so that the firearm cannot otherwise discharge. Drop tests were introduced with the federal Gun Control Act of 1968 for imported guns.

==== Safety notch ====
A safety notch is one of the oldest forms of drop safety, used on older single-action revolvers manufactured before the invention of the hammer block, some lever-action rifles, 1911-pattern guns, and hammer-fired semi-automatics that were designed before the invention of the firing pin block. The safety notch is a relief cut made in the tumbler at the base of the hammer, that allows the sear to catch and hold the hammer a short distance from the pin or cartridge primer, in a "half-cocked" position. The safety notch works first by allowing the handler to retract the hammer a short distance from the firing pin or primer, such that dropping the firearm on its hammer will not result in an energy transfer to the pin or spur, which could then discharge a chambered cartridge. A second purpose is to allow the sear to "catch" a hammer that is falling when the trigger has not been pulled, such as in cases where a drop jarred the sear loose or when the hammer was not fully cocked before being released. However, a safety notch used to "half-cock" a firearm is an active feature that must be engaged, and does not positively prevent accidental discharges in all cases. A certain amount of manual dexterity and familiarity with a firearm is also required to "half-cock" a firearm; unfamiliarity with how to engage the "half-cock" position can result in accidental discharges. Moreover, safety notch and "half-cock" style safeties are prone to breakage which can result in unintentional discharges leading to severe personal injuries or death.

==== Firing pin block ====
A firing pin block is a mechanical block used in semi-automatic firearms and some revolvers that, when at rest, obstructs forward travel of the firing pin, but is linked to the trigger mechanism and clears the obstruction to the pin just before the hammer or striker is released. This prevents the firing pin from striking a chambered cartridge unless the trigger is pulled, even if the hammer is released due to a faulty sear or the gun is dropped or struck by another object.

==== Hammer block ====
A hammer block is similar to a firing pin block. It is a latch, block or other obstruction built into the action and normally positioned to prevent the hammer contacting the cartridge primer or firing pin when at rest. Similar to the firing pin block, the obstruction to the hammer's travel is removed as a consequence of pulling the trigger. This allows the hammer to contact the primer or firing pin only when the trigger is pulled.

==== Transfer bar ====
A transfer bar is also used in revolvers and some exposed hammer rifles, but works the opposite way from a hammer block. The transfer bar has the spur that would otherwise be on the hammer, or encloses a firing pin similar to autoloading designs. The hammer itself cannot contact a loaded cartridge, but must instead strike the transfer bar, which then contacts the cartridge primer with the spur or pin. The transfer bar is normally positioned out of line with the hammer's travel, but is moved into place by the normal action of the trigger, providing similar "drop safety" to a firing pin block.

=== Bolt interlocks and trigger disconnects ===
Popular on bolt, pump and lever-action firearms such as shotguns and rifles, a bolt interlock disengages or blocks the trigger if, for any reason, the bolt/breech is not in its fully closed, ready position. A variation is the trigger disconnect which prevents the gun from firing until the gun has not only been fully and completely cycled, but the trigger is released and squeezed again. This defines the behavior of semi-automatic firearms which require a separate trigger pull to fire each successive cartridge and ready the next, and this is the preferred mechanism of disengaging the trigger on repeating-action firearms. Older pump-action shotguns such as the Winchester Model 1912 did not have such a feature, and as a result if the trigger was held the newly chambered round would be fired as soon as the breech had been closed.

Such disconnects or interlocks are generally simple to incorporate, and in fact are a by-product of many firearms' actions; pulling the trigger while the breech is unlocked or open does nothing as the mechanism is not fully reset until cycling is complete. As such these features are often not considered "true" safeties, although the interlock helps prevent misfires due to a cartridge not being fully in battery when its primer is struck by the pin (known as firing "out of battery"). Passing handguns or rifles to another person with the action open (known as "show clear") is recommended by elementary gun safety.

=== Magazine disconnects ===
A magazine disconnect feature does not allow a user to fire the gun when the magazine is withdrawn (even partially) by means of a mechanism that engages an internal safety such as a firing-pin block or trigger disconnect. An early example of its use was in the Browning Hi-Power pistol. As with any firearm feature, there is debate regarding the necessity of a magazine disconnect. Historically, most magazine-fed firearm designs had no magazine disconnector. There are exceptions, notably Ruger rimfire rifles and some of their newer handgun designs, and the U.S. State of California passed legislation in 2006 requiring magazine disconnects on all new handgun designs sold in the state starting January 1, 2007, which has resulted in their widespread availability in other jurisdictions as well.

The arguments in favor of a magazine disconnect are that if the gun cannot fire without a magazine, then an accidental discharge can be prevented if someone removes the magazine but forgets that a round has been chambered. Also, if losing possession of the firearm is imminent, the operator can render the firearm useless by removing the magazine. Firearms expert Massad Ayoob found instances where during a struggle, police officers carrying a pistol with a magazine disconnect were able to prevent being shot with their own guns by ejecting the magazine.

One disadvantage of the magazine disconnect is that it may add tension to components of the trigger mechanism, making the trigger pull uneven or heavy. A safety argument against a magazine disconnect is that if a round is left in a chamber due to extractor failure or other reason the firearm will revert to being live unexpectedly when an empty magazine is reinserted. This is a danger because the user may dry fire the gun during or after the unloading process. With a magazine disconnect depressing the trigger into a bullet trap or other safe direction, such as downrange, will not clear the round in the chamber because the trigger is disabled. When an empty magazine is inserted the firing system becomes reactivated, even though the trigger has been previously depressed. The Sporting Arms and Ammunition Manufacturers' Institute stated that an "obvious concern with magazine disconnect features is that determining whether the gun is safe becomes linked to the presence of the magazine as opposed to actually checking the gun, opening the action, and making sure it is unloaded."

Another concern is that if fatigue, debris or rust cause the disconnect mechanism to fail, it will most likely do so in the "fire" condition.

Further arguments are that functionally without a magazine the firearm is useless except as a club. Without the disconnect feature, a gun owner or police officer who accidentally releases the magazine in a gunfight would still be able to fire the bullet in the chamber; if a magazine was lost or otherwise not available, then at least the gun could be chambered with a single round to be used as a single-shot firearm. A Pro variant of the Ruger LC9s was introduced in December 2014, without a magazine disconnect, as a backup gun for law enforcement officers. "The absence of a magazine disconnect safety also is a benefit for tactical reloads that allow the user to engage a target with one round remaining in the chamber and the magazine out of the gun for reloading," Ruger said. A tactical reload is the tactic of replacing a partially empty magazine with a fully loaded magazine in a situation where increased capacity might be needed.

=== Integrated trigger safeties ===
These safeties, similar to grip safeties, are de-activated as a natural consequence of the shooter firing the firearm, but are engaged in most other circumstances. The trigger is composed of two interdependent parts, and the shooter in firing the firearm manipulates both parts of the trigger. Conversely, unintentional pressure or a strike against the trigger is unlikely to do so, and such an action will not fire the firearm. Such a design, made popular by Glock pistols but originally used in the 1897 Iver Johnson Second Model Safety Hammerless revolver, incorporates a trigger with a spring-loaded lever in its lower half. This lever which protrudes from the trigger face must be fully depressed in order to disengage a lock that allows the main trigger body to move. Unintentional pressure against the top of the trigger without pressing the lever does not disengage the lock and the trigger will not move. Other designs include a spring-loaded pad that forms the upper portion of the trigger face and manipulates a similar lock. This design has more moving parts, but is advantageous in that accidental pressure on the lock release has reduced leverage thus requiring more force to pull the main trigger, where force against the lower portion does not release the lock and will not move the trigger.

=== Loaded chamber indicator ===
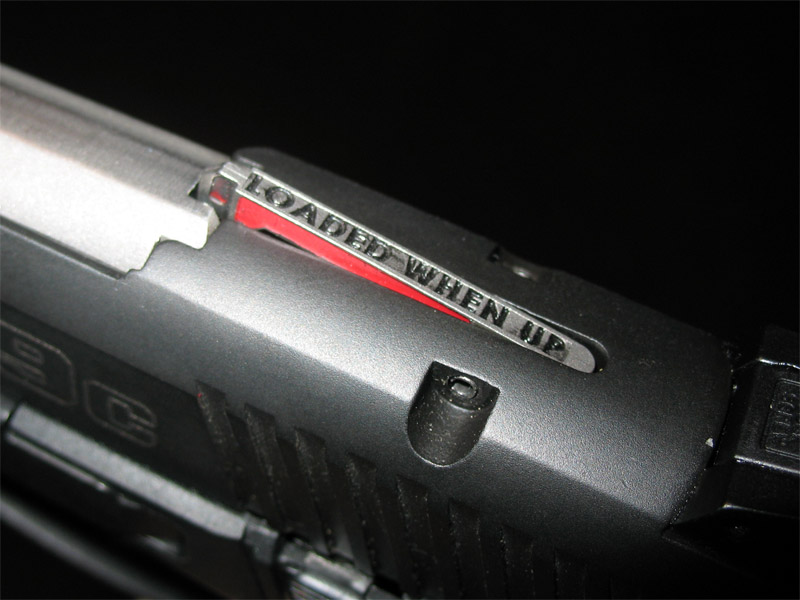
Loaded chamber indicators offer a tactile and visual warning to the shooter. The words "Loaded When Up" are present and the color red stands out against the gun's finish on this Ruger SR9.

The loaded chamber indicator is a device present on many semi-automatic handguns intended to alert an operator that there is a round in the chamber. It is typically a small button or pivoting lever (though sometimes a rod, such as on the Ruger series of .22 LR handguns, which are not slide pistols), generally located just behind the ejection port on the slide of the handgun that pops up to indicate the presence of a round in the chamber. Such devices have been in existence for decades; strictly speaking, loaded chamber indicators are not safeties, nor are they efficacious with an untrained user.

Another form of warning is an indicator behind the ejector port that does not rise enough to disrupt a shooter's sight picture, but enough to be easily seen or felt to alert a user that there is a round in the chamber.

The opposite of a loaded chamber indicator is an empty chamber flag.

=== Trigger disconnector ===
A trigger disconnector captures the hammer in the cocked position after a shot has been fired, even if the trigger is held to the rear as the gun cycles. This ensures the gun can only fire in the semi-automatic mode, as the trigger needs to be released to 'reset' and have the disconnector release the hammer back to the trigger sear. It also prevents out-of-battery "slamfire" malfunctions that occur when a hammer follows the bolt carrier group forward as it closes.

=== Other safeties ===
Examples of the variety of typical semi-auto mechanisms are a stiff double-action trigger pull with the safety off (Beretta 92F/FS), a double-action with no external safety (SIG Sauer P-series, or Kel-Tec P-32), or a crisp single-action trigger pull with a manual safety engaged (M1911, FN Five-seven and certain configurations of the HK USP). An alternative are striker-fired or "safe action" type firearms which have a consistent trigger pull requiring force greater than required by a single-action design, but lighter than needed for a double-action trigger. Many such firearms do not have an external safety or external hammer (Glock pistols and the Walther P99 and variants). In both cases a trigger pull always sends a discharge, with internal safeties preventing non-trigger-pull discharges (e.g., dropping the gun).

== Firearms ==
=== Pistols ===
Almost all modern semi-automatic handguns, except some exact replicas of antique models, have some form of safety mechanism including a "drop safety" that requires a trigger pull to discharge a cartridge. Single-action designs such as the Colt 1911 virtually always incorporate a manual safety, while traditional double-action pistols incorporate a decocker, manual safety, or both. However, the exact configuration depends on handgun type, year, make, and model. Double-action only (DAO) pistols, which usually use designs similar to traditional double-action but without the ability to remain cocked, do not usually have external safeties.

==== Single-action revolvers ====
Most single-action revolvers have no external safeties. The original designs, which dated to back before the US Civil War, had no internal safety to render them drop-safe, and were usually carried with an empty chamber under the hammer. Many original single-action revolvers have a half-cock "safety" notch on the hammer, but these are not drop-proof. Modern single-action revolvers, those made after the early 1970s, almost always have an internal safety, such as a hammer block or transfer bar. It is safe to carry such firearms with a loaded chamber under the hammer.

Some single-action revolvers have relief cuts in between cylinder bores that allow the hammer to be rested directly upon the cylinder with no chance of interacting with loaded cartridges or primers. These are also known colloquially as "safety notches." They are usually found on black-powder revolvers, but there are also metallic cartridge-firing revolvers with safety notches.

==== Double-action revolvers ====
Most double-action revolvers have no external safety devices; a sufficiently firm trigger pull will always result in firing. The heavy trigger pull required to cock and then fire the firearm usually prevents accidental discharges due to dropping or mishandling the gun. Most modern double-action revolvers have an internal safety, either a hammer block or a transfer bar, that positively prevents firing without the trigger being pulled.

The only modern double-action revolvers with external safeties are unusual cases available only on special order or modified through aftermarket conversions.

==== Glock semi-automatic pistols ====
Pistols made and imported by Glock Ges.m.b.H., such as the Glock 17, incorporate a design with three levels of integrated safety, known as safe action; there are no external safety switches on these handguns. First, an integrated trigger latch prevents the trigger body from moving unless the trigger is positively squeezed. Second, the gun's striker-firing mechanism is locked in place by an extension bar linked to the trigger; the striker cannot move unless the trigger is depressed. Third, as with most pistols, a firing pin block actuated by the same extension bar prevents the pin coming into contact with the primer unless the trigger is pulled to clear the block. Although not generally considered a safety feature, the resting state of the gun (excluding a dry/misfire) has the striker in a "half-cocked" state; pulling the trigger will fully cock the weapon before releasing the striker, and the mechanism is designed to have insufficient force to ignite the primer of an active cartridge from this state even if the sear lock and firing pin block both fail.

=== Rifles ===
Rifles come with various safeties. Some use a cross-bolt safety button, others a wing safety at the rear, or even a "half-cock" notch (such as found on older lever-action rifles). The Winchester Model 94 originally utilized a "half-cock" notch safety but the design was revised in 1983 due to numerous inadvertent discharges. The M1 Garand created a safety with a metal rocking lever at the front of the trigger guard that is now called the Garand-style safety, used in the Ruger Mini-14 rifle and Marlin Camp carbine.

Some bolt-action rifle safeties have three positions: "fire" which allows the gun to fire, "safe" which does not allow the gun to fire or the action to open, and an intermediate third position which cannot fire but allows the action to be opened to unload the rifle.

=== Shotguns ===
Common manual safeties for shotguns include button safeties located near or in front of the trigger guard and located at the top rear (or "tang") of the receiver. Button safeties are either left- or right-handed, but safeties on tang are ambidextrous.

== Aftermarket modifications ==
Certain handguns manufactured with no external safety lever (on-off/armed-safe), such as single-action revolvers, double-action revolvers, and Glock pistols can have one added by aftermarket companies.

== See also ==
The dictionary definition of molly-guard at Wiktionary

- Firearm – Gun for an individual
- Gun safety – Study and practice of safe operation of firearms
