= FN Herstal =

Belgian firearms manufacturer

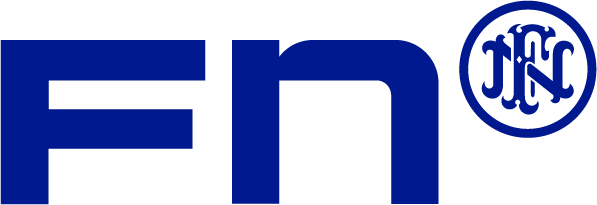
- Type: S.A.
- Industry: Arms industry
- Founded: 3 July 1889; 137 years ago
- Founder: Henri Pieper
- Headquarters: Herstal, Wallonia, Belgium
- Area served: Worldwide
- Key people: John Browning; Alexandre Galopin; Dieudonné Saive
- Products: Firearms, ammunition
- Number of employees: 3,000
- Parent: FN Browning Group
- Website: fnherstal.com

Fabrique Nationale Herstal (French for 'National Factory Herstal'), trading as FN Herstal and often referred to as Fabrique Nationale, or simply FN, is a firearms manufacturer based in Herstal, Belgium, and former vehicle manufacturer. It was the largest exporter of military small arms in Europe as of 2012.

FN Herstal is owned by FN Browning Group (formerly known as Herstal Group), which is in turn owned by the regional government of Wallonia. The Herstal Group also owns the Browning Arms Company and the U.S. Repeating Arms Company (Winchester).

FN America is the U.S. subsidiary of FN Herstal, which was formed by the merger of FN's previous two American subsidiaries – FN Manufacturing and FNH USA. A manufacturing facility in the United Kingdom, FN UK, is also in operation.

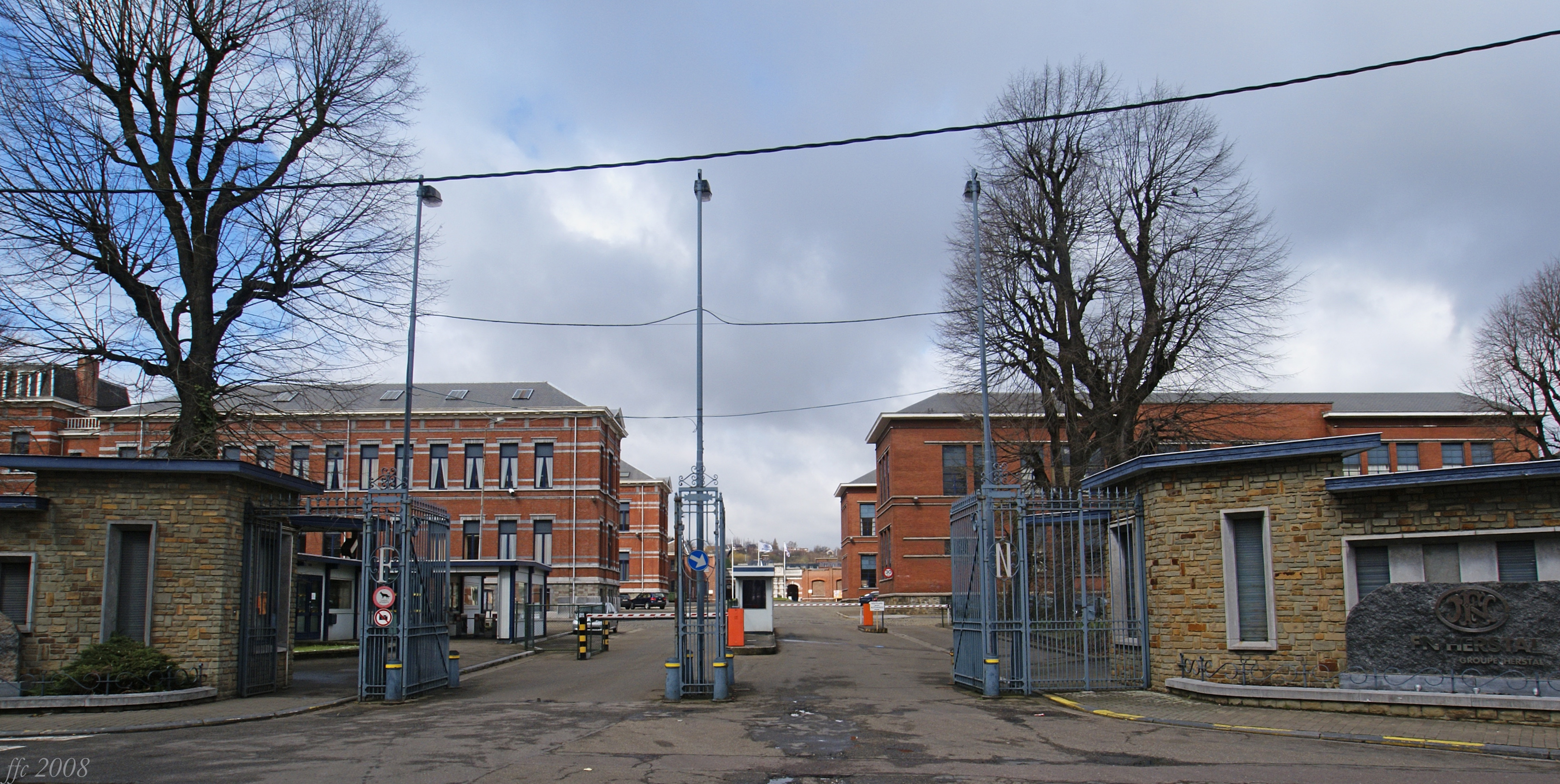
View of the factory site

Firearms designed and/or manufactured by FN include the FN Minimi, Browning Hi-Power and Five-seven pistols, the FAL, FNC, F2000 and SCAR rifles, the P90 submachine gun, the M2 Browning, MAG general purpose machine gun, and the FN Evolys light machine; all have been commercially successful. FN Herstal's firearms are used by the armed forces of over 100 countries.

== History ==
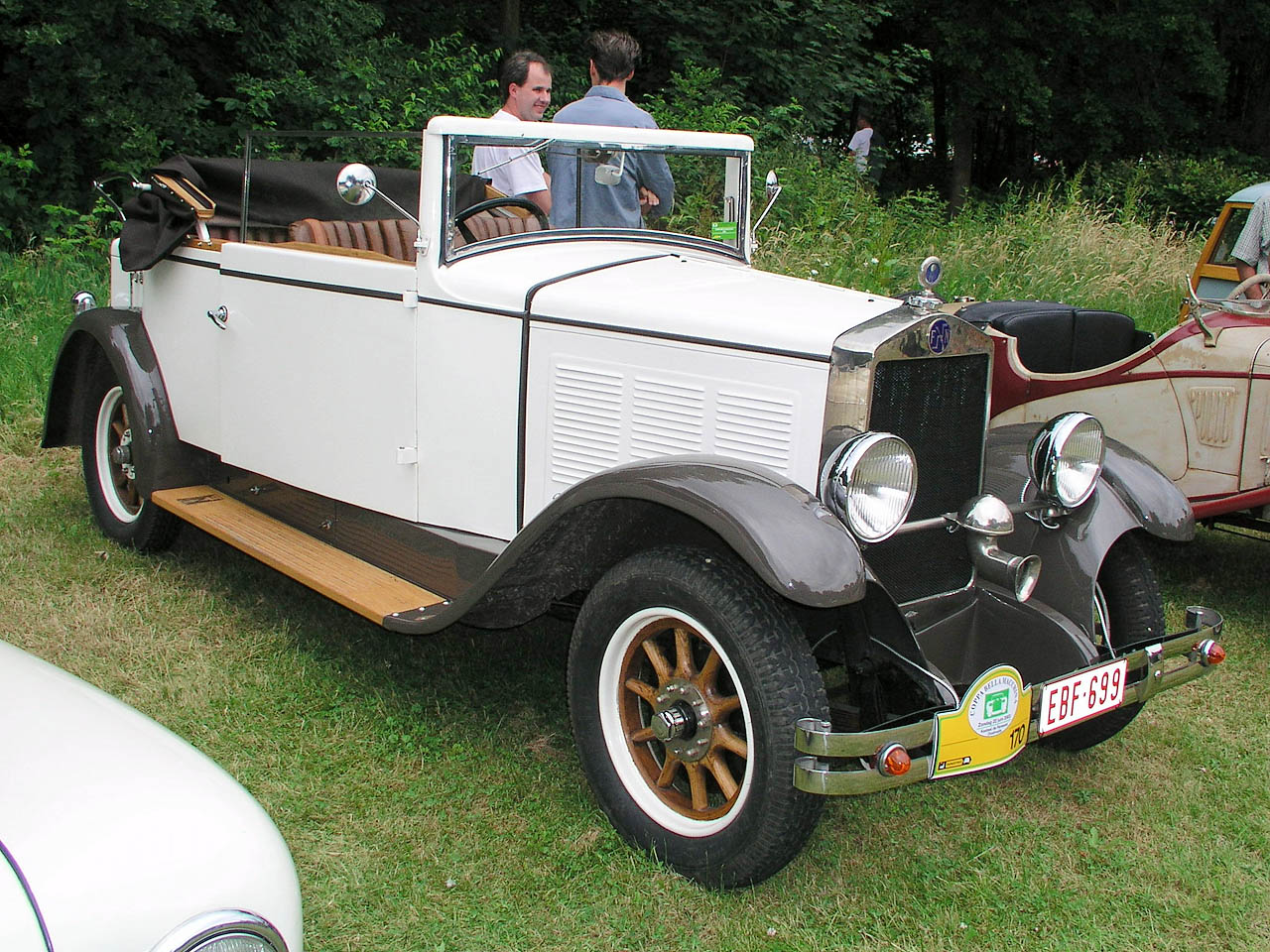
1931 FN cabriolet

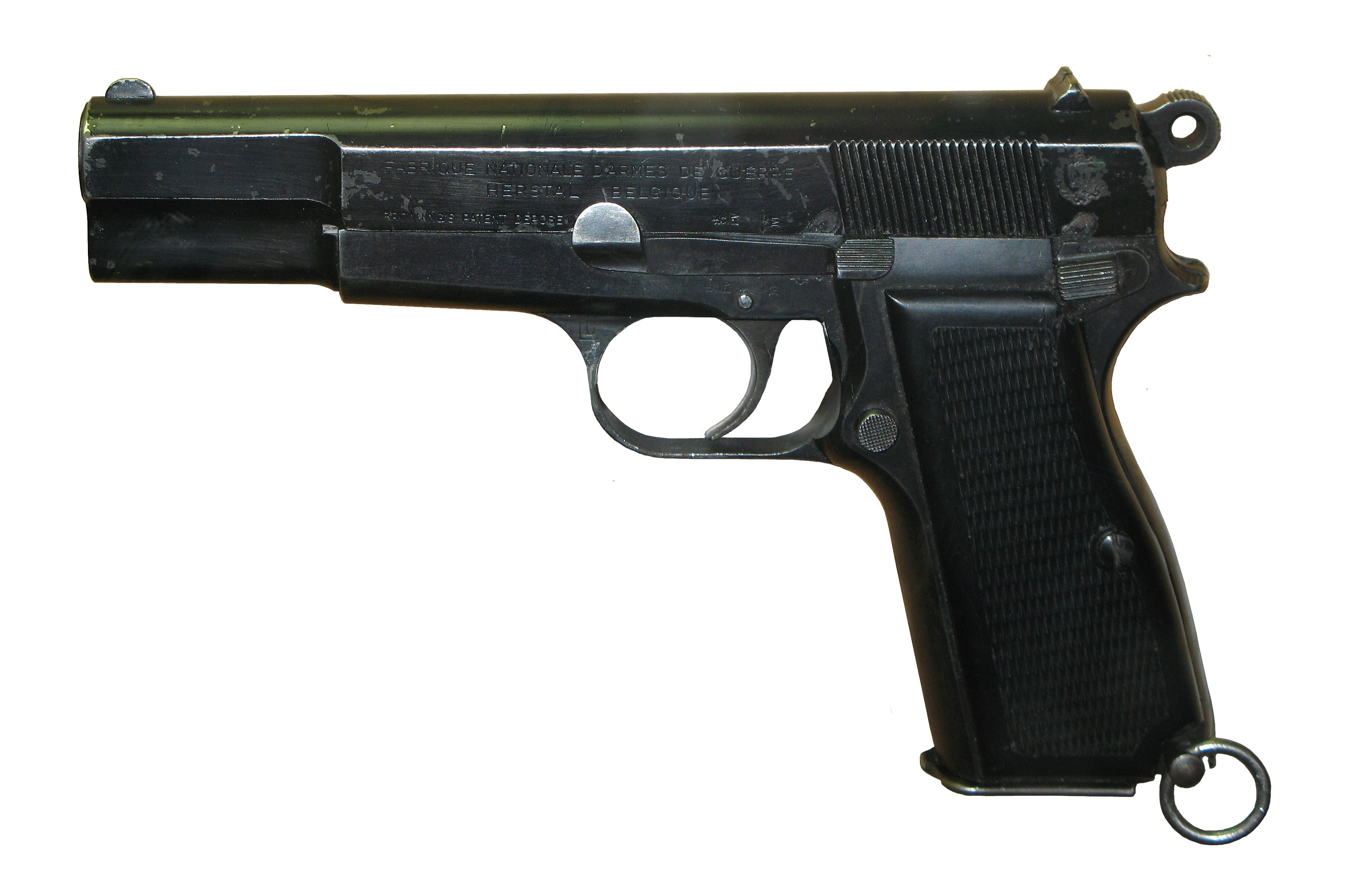
FN Browning Hi-Power pistol

FN Herstal originated in the small city of Herstal, near Liège. The Fabrique Nationale d'Armes de Guerre (French for 'National Factory of Weapons of War') was established in 1889 to manufacture 150,000 Mauser Model 89 rifles ordered by the Belgian government. FN was co-founded by the major arms makers of the Liège region, with Henri Pieper of Anciens Etablissements Pieper being the driving force and the primary shareholder of the new company. In 1897, the company entered into a long-lasting relationship with John Browning, a well-known American firearms designer.

The company was an important manufacturer of motor vehicles in Belgium, a development championed by Alexandre Galopin as managing director. FN cars were produced in Herstal from the early 1900s until 1935. Production of FN motorcycles continued until 1965, and production of trucks until 1970. In 1973, FN changed its name to reflect a diversified product line far beyond just military Small Arms and Firearms manufacturing, adopting the current name of Fabrique Nationale d'Herstal.

One of Fabrique Nationale's handguns, a Model 1910 semi-automatic pistol in 9×17mm (.380 ACP) (serial number 19074), was one of four weapons that were taken from the assassins of Archduke Franz Ferdinand of Austria, although it is unknown which of the four weapons fired the fatal round.

Browning began the development of the GP35 "High Power" pistol, the GP standing for Grande Puissance (French for "high power"). The weapon was finalized by FN's Dieudonné Saive and did not appear until 1935, nearly a decade after Browning's death; it remained in production until 2017.

FN Herstal also had an aerospace engines division and became the only aircraft engine manufacturer in Benelux. Established 1949 in Liers, it manufactured parts, and made and assembled complete engines under licence from British, French and US companies. When four European countries, including Belgium, adopted the F-16 fighter in 1977, FN Herstal built an entirely new plant that made parts, assembled and tested the engines for these aircraft. The FN Division Moteurs also supplied parts for the Ariane space programme. However, by 1987, FN Herstal had divested itself of these activities, which today are part of the Safran Group.

In 2023 the company posted a profit of 75 million euros on its second-highest ever revenue, of 908 million euros.

On 17 February 2024 FN Herstal launched a venture capital group named FNX with 20 million euro capital.

FN Browning Group commemorated its 135th anniversary with an exhibition in Liège's La Boverie museum from 25 April to 26 July 2025.

== FN America ==
The FN Manufacturing LLC plant in Columbia, South Carolina, is part of the military division of FN. It is primarily responsible for the production of U.S. military weapons, such as M16 rifles, SCARs, M249 light machine guns, M240 machine guns, and M2 machine guns.

== See also ==
- List of weapons developed by FN Herstal
