= Adcor Defense =

American firearms manufacturer

- Type: Private
- Industry: Defense
- Headquarters: Baltimore, Maryland
- Products: Firearms
- Website: www.adcordefense.com

Adcor Defense is a firearms manufacturer located in Baltimore, Maryland. Adcor Defense is the manufacturer of the ADCOR A-556 ELITE rifles. Adcor Defense advertises that all their weapons and accessories are made in the United States.

The Adcor Defense Company was one of the contenders in the US Army Individual Carbine Competition to replace the M4 Carbine. The Individual Carbine competition was cancelled before a winner was chosen. On July 17, 2013, Adcor Defense announced it would not protest the Army's decision to terminate the program. The company will instead focus on providing the ADCOR A-556 ELITE to commercial customers for sporting and hunting. Adcor also emphasized that it is willing to support weapon improvement programs in the U.S. military, including the M4 Product Improvement Program (PIP) and any future calls for designs for new rifles.
