= Adcor A-556 =

Assault rifle manufactured by Adcor Defense

ADCOR A-556
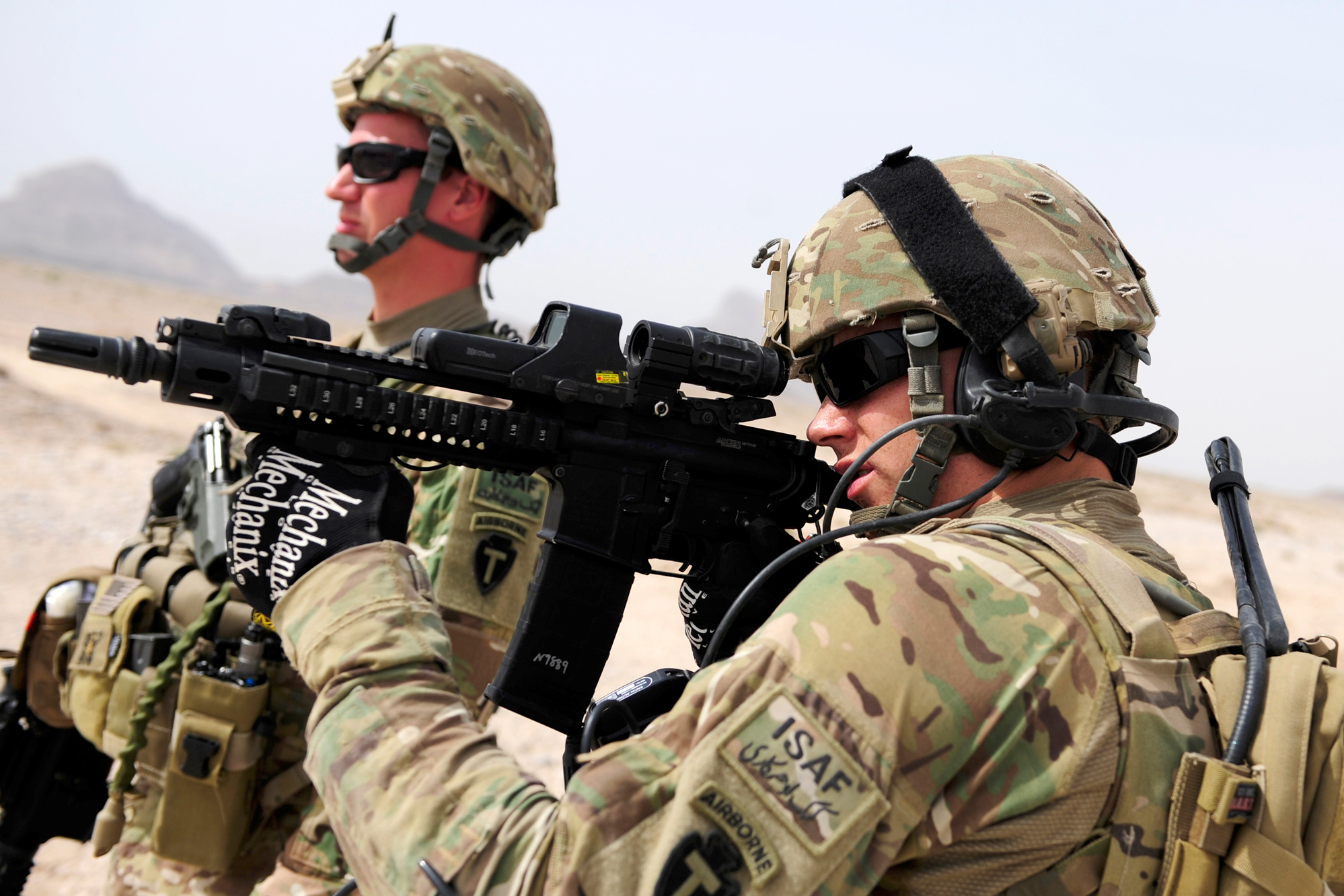
- Type: Assault rifle/carbine
- Place of origin: United States

Production history
- Designer: Adcor Defense
- Manufacturer: Adcor Defense
- Produced: 2010–2020
- Variants: ADCOR A-556 Elite

Specifications
- Cartridge: 5.56×45mm NATO
- Action: Rotating bolt, selective fire
- Muzzle velocity: 2,800 ft/s (850 m/s) (5.56 mm from a 14.5 in barrel)
- Feed system: STANAG-compliant magazine

The ADCOR A-556 is an assault rifle based on the M16/M4 series. It is produced by the Adcor Defense Company and was one of the contenders in the US Army Individual Carbine Competition to replace the M4 Carbine.

== History ==
In 2005, Adcor Defense was contracted by Colt to produce upper receivers for the M4 Carbine. Adcor was able to produce 1,000 uppers per day, compared to 450 uppers per day that Colt was able to manufacture. After years of production, Adcor Defense decided to improve upon the weapon. They claimed it was not a "new and improved" AR, but a patented revolutionary gas piston system with other key features that set it apart from all other M4-type rifles.

=== Testing ===
In early 2010, Adcor sent the ADCOR A-556 rifle to H.P. White Laboratory, known for small arms and ammunition research, development, and testing, to test the reliability of the design. Testing took place from March to April. 6,000 rounds were fired in 120 round cycles, and the guns were lubricated and allowed to cool after 600-round intervals. During the tests, no parts had to be replaced and there were no jams, stoppages, or malfunctions of any kind. Following this, the A-556 was able to shoot a .88 MOA group at 100 yards with 69-grain match ammo.

=== Production ===
On December 8, 2010, Adcor announced production of the A-556 rifle to the civilian market. On June 27, 2011, it was announced that the improved A-556 Elite variant would be available for sale to the public. In June 2012, a soldier was seen in Afghanistan with a A-556 upper receiver with a 10.5-inch (270 mm) barrel on an M4 lower receiver.

=== Individual Carbine Competition ===
On May 12, 2011, Adcor announced that its A-556 rifle had been entered in the U.S. Army's Individual Carbine competition. They say their design increases the reliability, accuracy, and lethality of the existing soldier weapon, stating "The A-556 combines a new piston system with an exclusive ejection port dust wiper with cover, an ambidextrous forward placing charging handle, and a new key-locked, highly rigid rail system." On May 4, 2012, the A-556 Elite version was selected into phase II of the competition. The Individual Carbine competition was cancelled before a winning weapon was chosen. On 17 July 2013, Adcor announced it would not protest the Army's decision to terminate the program, and would focus on delivering A-556 rifles to commercial customers.

== Design details ==
The cornerstone of the A-556 rifle design is the piston operating system. A gas-driven piston is incorporated into the upper half of the forward rail system and never touches the barrel. This makes the barrel free-floating, which increases accuracy. The operating rod is connected to the bolt carrier group and rides through a machined boss in the receiver rail system interface, keeping the bolt carrier in a linear plane as it operates; this eliminates carrier tilt. A spring-loaded dust shield mounted on the bolt carrier allows the bolt carrier to return to ready position. The port dust wiper moves into the ejection port opening flush of the upper receiver.

A forward placed, foldable, non-reciprocating charging handle is mounted on the handguard, allowing the weapon to be charged or cleared while keeping it pointed toward a target. It is ambidextrous, being able to be removed without tools to either side of the gun. The A-556 has integrated picatinny rails for mounting accessories. The handguard has an M4 profile, so the charging handle is placed directly above the rail. Therefore, it needs a completely unobstructed space on the rail to charge the rifle, negating the usefulness of the rail on the side it is on. By contrast, on weapons like the Adaptive Combat Rifle and the FN SCAR, the charging handle is raised off the side rails, allowing things to be mounted.

== Variants ==
ADCOR A-556 rifles come in barrel lengths of 10.5 in (270 mm), 14.5 in (370 mm), 16 in (410 mm), 18 in (460 mm), and 20 in (510 mm).
