= Colt Advanced Piston Carbine =

5.56mm, Advanced Piston Carbine
- Type: Assault rifle
- Place of origin: United States

Service history
- In service: 2010s–present
- Used by: See Users

Production history
- Manufacturer: Colt's Manufacturing Company

Specifications
- Mass: 7 lb (3.2 kg) empty 7.5 lb (3.4 kg) with 30 rounds
- Length: 33 in (840 mm) (stock extended); 29.8 in (760 mm) (stock retracted)
- length: 14.5 in (370 mm)

The Colt Advanced Piston Carbine or Colt APC (internal product number P0923) is a lightweight modular 5.56mm caliber piston-operated, magazine fed carbine with a one-piece upper receiver which is capable of firing in automatic and semi-automatic modes. The design incorporates an articulating link piston that reduces the stresses in the piston stroke by allowing for deflection and thermal expansion.

Colt submitted the APC as the “Enhanced M4” for the U.S. Army's Individual Carbine competition to replace the M4 carbine in 2012. However, the competition was canceled in 2013 before a winning weapon was chosen. The APC was adopted in limited quantities by several military and law enforcement agencies.

== Design ==
The weapon has a suppression-ready fluted barrel, which is lighter and cools better than previous M4 barrels. It is claimed to have "markedly better" accuracy. To improve reliability, Colt used an articulating link piston (ALP) which "reduces the inherent stress in the piston stroke by allowing for deflection and thermal expansion". In traditional gas piston operating systems, the force of the piston striking the bolt carrier can push the bolt carrier downwards and into the wall of the buffer tube, leading to accelerated wear and even chipped metal. This is known as carrier tilt. The ALP (articulating link piston) allows the operating rod to wiggle to correct for the downward pressure on the bolt and transfers the force straight backwards in line with the bore and buffer assembly, eliminating the carrier tilt. This relieves stress on parts and helps to increase accuracy.

== Users ==
- Malaysia: Malaysian Special Operations Force units, the UTK and the VAT69
- Singapore: Singapore Police Force, Used by the Special Task Squadron and Emergency Response Team of the Police Coast Guard.
