= Individual Carbine =

2011–2013 US Army assault rifle procurement plan

Carbine Competition logo

The Individual Carbine was a competition to select the planned successor to the M4 carbine in the United States Army.

The U.S. Army conducted an open competition for a carbine to replace the M4. This competition was for the Army only—the United States Marine Corps and other branches chose to stay with current weapons in service. The proposal was passed before the Joint Requirements Oversight Council in August 2010, and the Army was to solicit submissions from the small arms industry by the end of that year. The competition was open to all manufacturers. However, Phase II testing reduced the field down to six rifles. The competition was intended to provide an evaluation of the full range of weapons available. Presolicitation notice W15QKN-11-R-F003 was posted January 31, 2011.

Complete results of the competition and selection of a new carbine were expected before FY 2013. However, the competition was cancelled in June 2013.

== Design requirements ==
The Individual Carbine was to provide accurate and reliable firepower. It had to be capable of semi-automatic and full-automatic fire. Integrated rails were to accept MIL-STD-1913 Picatinny rail-mounted accessories. It had to be fully ambidextrous. While the caliber for any new weapon was open for the competition, any contributions not of 5.56×45mm NATO and/or 7.62×51mm NATO had the burden of test ammunition and extra costs placed on the competitor. The draft asked for a non-developmental weapon. Rather than working with the Army to develop a new weapon, competitors were to bring forward designs they already had available.

== Testing ==
Weapons submitted included the XCR by Robinson Armament Co., an off-the-shelf or derivative of the M6A4 by LWRC, the ACR by Remington, the SR-16 by Knight's Armament Company, the FN SCAR by FN Herstal, the CM901 by Colt's Manufacturing Company, and the HK416 by Heckler & Koch. A draft request for proposal (RFP) was issued in late 2010 followed by an industry day. The finalized RfP was issued in second quarter FY 2011 to which industry had a month to respond. A 12- to 18-month testing phase commenced and over 1 million rounds were to be fired. Testers looked at the consistency in accuracy of the carbines as they aged. Costs were also to be considered. The Office of the Secretary of Defense monitored tests and the evaluation and there was congressional oversight to ensure the competition was full and open. US$30 million was spent on testing. The winner of the competition had to be a "measurable improvement" over the M4 carbine to replace it; otherwise, the program would instead convert all M4 carbines to the enhanced version. The winner of the competition would sell the rights to their weapon to the military and choose two other competing suppliers to help manufacture it.

As for fielding a possible winner, the Army had over 1.1 million armed personnel at the time. Approximately half were front-line combat brigades. If a new carbine were selected, the Army would see 500,000 purchased for infantry brigade combat teams (IBCT), and the existing and improved M4s given to support troops to replace their M16s. If the improved M4 turned out to be the winner and the new carbine program scrapped, then the IBCTs would likely be fitted with the improved M4s, and the existing M4s would again be given to support troops to replace their M16s. On November 17, 2011, the US Marine Corps announced they will not participate or adopt any new weapon which may or may not come out of the competition. The USMC said they will continue to use standard M4s and M16A4s. They did mention considering upgrading the M16A4. General Jim Amos said on April 16, 2013, that the Marines were watching the Army program and whether or not they would join was "yet to be seen."

=== M855A1 Familiarization Shoot and Compatibility Check ===
The first round of tests were carried out from January to May 2011. Rifles chambered in 5.56×45mm NATO participated in a "familiarization shoot" at ranges of 25 and 300 yards firing the M855A1 Enhanced Performance Round. Rifle contenders were also allowed to participate in the "compatibility check" which consisted of the firing of the M320 grenade launcher and M26 Modular Accessory Shotgun System underbarrel attachment systems.

=== Phase I ===
Phase I of the competition commenced following the familiarization shoot. It included the weapon's ability to mount accessories, such as optics and suppressors, the company's ability to produce 2,000–4,200 carbines per month, and production costs. In November 2011, Colt pulled its CM901 rifle from the competition. This was because the winner is required to turn over technical data rights to the Army, who would distribute the blueprints to two other companies that would each produce one-third of the weapons purchased, and Colt did not want to reveal its trade secrets. Other companies backed out for similar financial reasons, including Smith & Wesson with their M&P 4, Stag Arms, LWRC, and Knight's Armament Company. Stag Arms then bid for the contract to produce one-third of the winning weapon order quantity, while Knight's Armament submitted components for the upgraded M4A1.

=== Phase II ===
In May 2012, the Army selected the companies and rifles that passed phase I of the competition and moved on to phase II. While phase I eliminated companies that would not have had the production capacity to manufacture sufficient numbers of their rifle, phase II included actual test firings of the weapons to assess accuracy, reliability, and durability. The phase II contenders were the FN FNAC, the Heckler & Koch HK416A5, a modified variant of the Remington ACR, the Adcor Defense BEAR Elite, the Beretta ARX160, and the Colt Enhanced M4.

Phase II test scoring, in order of priority, depended upon:

- Development Tests: A detailed evaluation of accuracy and dispersion at distances of 100, 300, and 600 meters using 90 rounds at each range. Another 21,600 rounds were used to test reliability, durability, and barrel life to determine performance over the weapon's entire life cycle.
- Secondary Development Tests: Weapons must score hits with as few shots as possible. Sustained rates of fire and cook-off were tested, along with the weapon's ability to operate in extreme temperatures and environments. "Weapons will be beat up, dropped, submerged in water and fired while lacking lubrication and covered by ice and mud."
- Cost: The Army will not purchase an overpriced carbine, but the RfP stated, "when all evaluation factors other than price are combined, they are significantly more important than price."
- Government Purpose Rights: The Army will contract three manufacturers to produce a maximum of 178,890 carbines each to keep costs down and ensure delivery even if one cannot meet production goals.
- Limited User Evaluation: Tests were to use co-ed teams of 16 soldiers to determine each weapon's probability and quality of hit, time of first trigger pull, and mobility and portability in an operational environment. They were to engage targets at short and long range, as well as in close-quarters. Targets were to be stationary, mobile, and exposed for various times.

Phase II was to last 12–18 months and narrow the field of contenders down to three.

== Cancellation ==
On March 19, 2013, the Defense Department released a testimony as part of their efforts to improve spending efficiency and reduce overall waste. Part of the testimony was the Pentagon Inspector General's reconsideration of the Individual Carbine program to replace the M4. An audit of the acquisition process was launched to re-evaluate the $1.8 billion program. Program experts and Army officials asserted that the testimony misunderstood the carbine replacement initiative. The Individual Carbine competition was to find a commercially available rifle design superior to the M4A1, while the M4 Product Improvement Program worked on improving the current M4 design if the competition didn't yield major improvements. The Inspector General questioned why the Army was pursuing a new rifle when the structure of their total force will be reduced. In the next two months a draft report was to be released elaborating concerns and giving recommendations to the Defense Department.

On May 2, 2013, the Army announced it was considering cancelling the Individual Carbine competition. Phase II of testing had been completed, but not soldier evaluation or contract awards as part of Phase III. With M4A1 Carbines being purchased through 2018, the Army was rethinking carbine acquisition. PEO Soldier (Program Executive Office Soldier), a group responsible for rapid prototyping, procurement, and fielding of equipment for soldiers, had scheduled a roundtable for reporters on May 23 which would include project managers and officials. The PEO Soldier press conference was postponed to an unknown date because senior leaders had not made any decisions on the competition or other equipment programs.

On June 6, 2013, the House Armed Services Committee passed an amendment to the 2014 budget that would prevent the Army from cancelling the IC program before user evaluations. Committee members voted unanimously for the amendment that would require user evaluations, a business case analysis, and reports back to congressional defense committees before a final decision is made. If passed into law, it would not take effect until October 1, 2013, which gave the Army four months to decide the fate of the program without violating a congressional directive.

On June 13, 2013, the U.S. Army formally cancelled the Individual Carbine competition. The Army said none of the carbines evaluated during testing met the minimum scoring requirement needed to continue to the next phase of the evaluation. Letters were sent to gunmakers involved to inform them that no future contract awards would be made for the soldier evaluation phase. PEO Soldier reported that no competitor demonstrated a significant improvement in weapon reliability to justify buying a new carbine. Weapons tested also had low reliability performance using M855A1 Enhanced Performance Rounds (EPR). Ultimately, the Army decided not to pursue a new carbine because of consideration of operational requirements in the context of available small arms technology, the constrained fiscal environment, and the capability of their current carbines. One reliability requirement that was not reached by the vendors was firing 3,592 mean rounds without malfunctioning. In 1990, the M4 was required to fire 600 mean rounds between stoppages, while the current M4A1 fires 1,691 mean rounds between stoppages using M855A1 ammunition. PEO Soldier said that the new carbine had to be a superior improvement, not a small improvement. The Army has not released how close the competitors came to reaching the mean rounds between stoppages requirement, or how they performed compared to the M4A1. That information is seen as proprietary, and may be up to the manufacturers to release data. Analysis has not yet been done to determine if any exact event cause per vendor led to performance failures.

=== Responses ===
The Army clarified that it was not cancelling the IC competition, but that it was in a position to conclude it. Industry participants said the competition was plagued by miscommunication from the Army. Gabriele de Plano, vice president of military marketing and sales for Beretta, said he knew nothing of what the Army was planning just weeks before cancellation. Other companies expressed concern that they had learned the program may be cancelled through media reports rather than being informed directly. Army officials said they were surprised that none of the rifles submitted passed muster and maintained that there was transparency throughout the three-year competition. Brigadier General Paul A. Ostrowski, head of PEO Soldier, said the Army simply did not find the capability it was after with the rifles submitted. None of the weapons met minimum requirements. The competition was a binary pass-or-fail venue, rather than a test-fix-test venue to improve the weapons following test results. Mark Westrom, owner of ArmaLite which designed the original M16 rifle, said the competition was "destined to fail" because the requirements did not represent a significant advance in fighting ability. The Army admitted each entrant offered marginal improvements over the M4 Carbine, but that none would substantially increase a soldier's battlefield capability. Westrom said the carbines offered incremental improvements, not any that offered a tactically superior advance to justify replacing the entire inventory. There were also complaints about the ammunition used in testing. The competition began while the M855 round was in use. In June 2010, the M855A1 Enhanced Performance Round was fielded, and the competition began using the EPR in August. Army analysis found that the M855A1 may have contributed to lower than expected reliability performance. Even so, the Army insists they made industry aware of the ammo change, giving them time to adjust their designs and arranging for each vendor to fire 10,000 M855A1s at a private range. Westrom said ammunition and caliber conflicts had little to do with it, as neither those factors nor the rifle designs would fundamentally change the battlefield capabilities of a soldier or small unit, while previous weapon transitions advanced combat shooting doctrines and shooting tactics. ArmaLite did not participate in the competition because Westrom determined their designs weren't a revolutionary improvement over the M4 weapon system, and because the published Army requirements "set the bar so low" that the outcome that no one would win a contract was "predetermined."

On June 17, 2013, Senator Tom Coburn sent a letter to Secretary of the Army John M. McHugh expressing his disappointment in the decision to cancel the program without giving soldiers an opportunity to field test the weapons to determine if they were improvements over the current M4. Senator Coburn's efforts in 2008 led the Army to look if industry had anything to offer that was better than the M4, which lead to the IC competition. Coburn wanted to know where money from the cancelled program would go and why near-term small arms strategies did not include an assessment of a medium-caliber round for increased battlefield capability.

On July 17, 2013, Adcor Defense announced it would not protest the Army's decision to terminate the program, and would focus on delivering BEAR rifles to commercial customers. Adcor Chairman and CEO Jimmy Stavrakis said though they were "disappointed that the Army chose to discontinue a competition that could have provided soldiers with significant improvements in accuracy and reliability," they accepted the decision. Test results made available to the company said the Army found the B.E.A.R. provided “outstanding” accuracy, even after firing thousands of rounds.

The Pentagon Inspector General audit of the Individual Carbine competition continued despite the program's termination. On September 16, 2013, the Inspector General published a report on the audit's findings. The analysis said the Army wasted $14 million to find new rifles it did not need. The report reads, "The Army Deputy Chief of Staff … inappropriately approved and validated the requirements document used to support the establishment of the individual carbine program. As a result, the Army wasted about $14 million on a competition to identify a source to supply new carbines it does not need." It would have cost $2.52 billion for the 501,289 carbines the Army planned to buy over a 20-year cycle. The Army's own analysis suggested the procurement could be delayed for another 10 years with no impact on readiness. The Army will recoup $382 million it can “put to better use,” of which $375 million was programmed procurement funding. The other $7 million was set aside for research, development, testing, and evaluation. Another $2.14 billion in expenditures will be avoided through 2018 as a result of the termination. Research and development funding set aside in the FY 2013 budget was put into operation and maintenance accounts, while procurement funding allocated in fiscal years 2015 to 2018 are under review to be funneled to other Army priorities. The review of the Individual Carbine competition was part of an overall ongoing small arms weapons strategy development, to include assessment and analysis of current individual weapons, optics, and training to determine if additional capabilities in range and lethality will be needed against future adversaries.

== See also ==
- Special Purpose Individual Weapon—United States
- XM8 rifle—Germany, United States
- Advanced Combat Rifle—United States
- Objective Individual Combat Weapon program—United States
- Advanced Individual Combat Weapon Program—Australia
- Project Abakan—Russia
- XM17 Modular Handgun System competition—United States

== Bibliography ==
- This article incorporates public domain material from websites or documents of the United States Army.
- Feickert, Andrew (June 8, 2010). "The Army's M-4 Carbine: Background and Issues for Congress" (PDF). Congressional Research Service.
