= Adaptive Combat Rifle =

American modular assault rifle

ACR (Adaptive Combat Rifle)
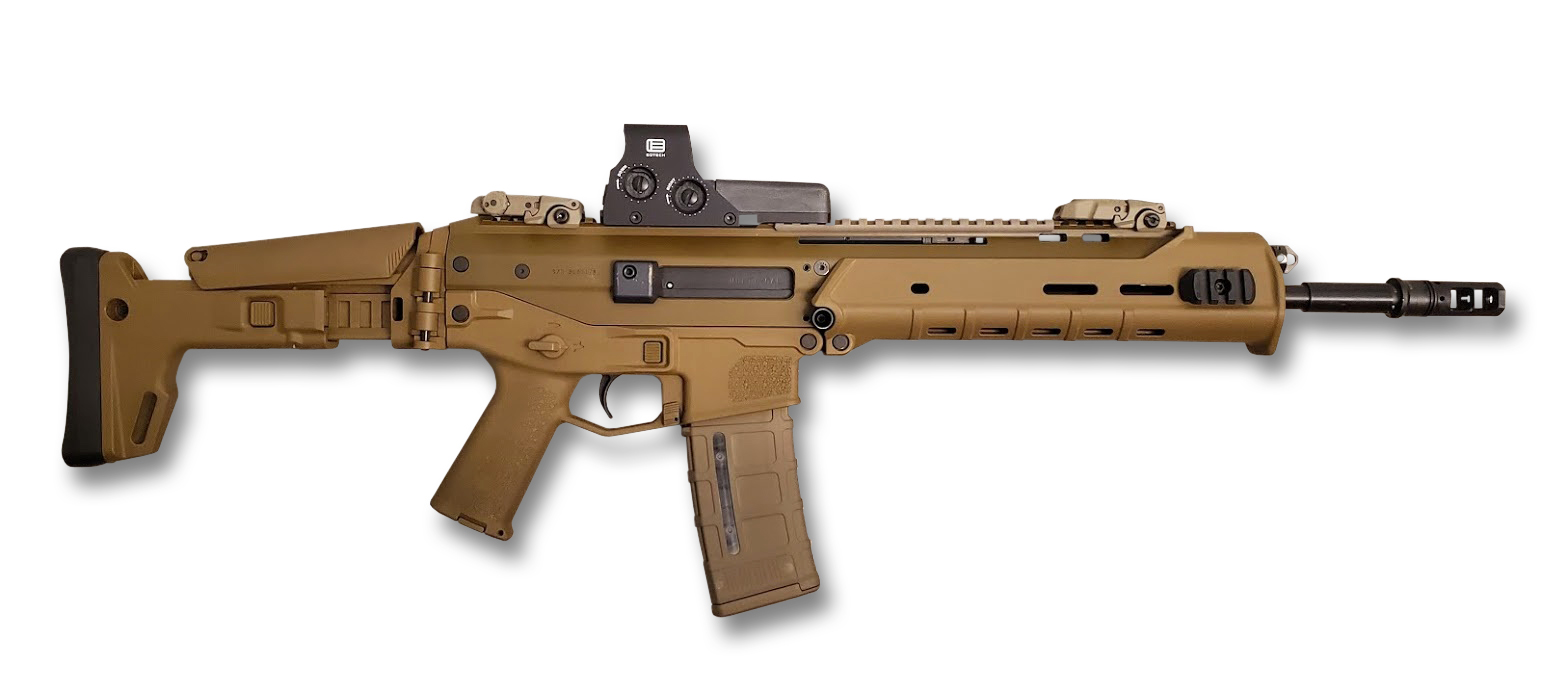
- Bushmaster ACR in Coyote finish with an EOTech holographic sight
- Type: Assault rifle (Remington ACR); Semi-automatic rifle (Bushmaster ACR)
- Place of origin: United States

Service history
- Used by: See Users
- Wars: War in Afghanistan (2001–2021); Russo-Ukrainian War

Production history
- Designer: Magpul Industries
- Designed: 2006
- Manufacturer: Remington Arms (military); Bushmaster Firearms International (civilian)
- Produced: 2010–2020
- Variants: See Variants

Specifications
- Mass: 7.9–9.8 lb (3.6–4.4 kg)
- Length: 25.8 in (660 mm) (stock folded); 32.6 in (830 mm) (stock deployed); 35.5 in (900 mm) (stock extended)
- Barrel length: 8.25 in (210 mm) (Remington ACR); 10.5 in (270 mm); 14.5 in (370 mm) (Remington ACR); 16.5 in (420 mm); 18.5 in (470 mm)
- Cartridge: 5.56×45mm NATO; 6.8mm Remington SPC (Bushmaster/Remington ACR); 6.5mm Grendel (Remington ACR); 7.62×39mm (Bushmaster ACR); .450 Bushmaster (Bushmaster ACR)
- Action: Gas-operated short-stroke piston, rotating bolt
- Rate of fire: 700 rounds/min
- Muzzle velocity: 5.56×45mm NATO: 2,630–3,050 ft/s (800–930 m/s); .450 Bushmaster: 1,625–2,105 ft/s (495–642 m/s)
- Effective firing range: 500 m (550 yd) for point target; 600 m (660 yd) for area target
- Feed system: 30-round detachable STANAG magazines
- Sights: Magpul MBUS and integrated Picatinny rail provided for various optical sights

The Adaptive Combat Rifle (ACR), known initially as the Masada is a modular assault rifle designed by Magpul Industries of Austin, Texas.

In late January 2008, Bushmaster Firearms International entered into a licensing agreement with Magpul whereby Bushmaster would take over production, future development, and sales of the Masada. The Magpul Masada was then known as the Bushmaster ACR. However, Remington Arms is contracted to manufacture the rifle for the U.S. military and law enforcement agencies, in which it is known as the Remington ACR. Hence, Remington Arms is responsible for the selective-fire variant of the ACR, while Bushmaster Firearms International is responsible for the semi-automatic only variant.

The Remington ACR was one of the carbines displayed to United States Army officials during an invitation-only Industry Day on November 13, 2008. The goal of the Industry Day was to review current carbine technology prior to writing formal requirements for a future replacement for the M4 carbine. The Remington ACR was also part of the Individual Carbine competition to replace the M4.

== History ==
=== Origin of the Magpul Masada ===
The original Magpul Masada's design represented a combination of several recent assault rifle designs, incorporating what was considered by its designers to be the best features of each in a single, lightweight, modular rifle. Design features from the Armalite AR-18 (short-stroke gas system), the FN SCAR (upper receiver, charging handle location), the Heckler & Koch G36 and XM8 (wide use of polymer components), and the M16/AR-15 (trigger pack, barrel, fire control group) were present. The rifle also included several features developed by Magpul, such as a quick-change barrel/trunnion system, adjustable gas regulator, non-reciprocating charging handle, and storage compartments located in the stock and grip. Just prior to the deal with Bushmaster, Magpul made additional changes to their design, the most obvious of these was the relocation of the ambidextrous operating handle to a forward position (somewhat similar to the Heckler & Koch G3 and Heckler & Koch MP5). The rifle's caliber could easily be changed by replacing the bolt head, magazine, and barrel.

The ACR was originally named after the Siege of Masada. Magpul company literature about the rifle states that "Magpul Industries is neither Jewish-owned nor Israeli-backed; however, Magpul has always found the story of Masada as a bold example of defiance". When production rights were signed with Bushmaster, the Masada name was dropped from the product.

=== Bushmaster and Remington acquisition ===
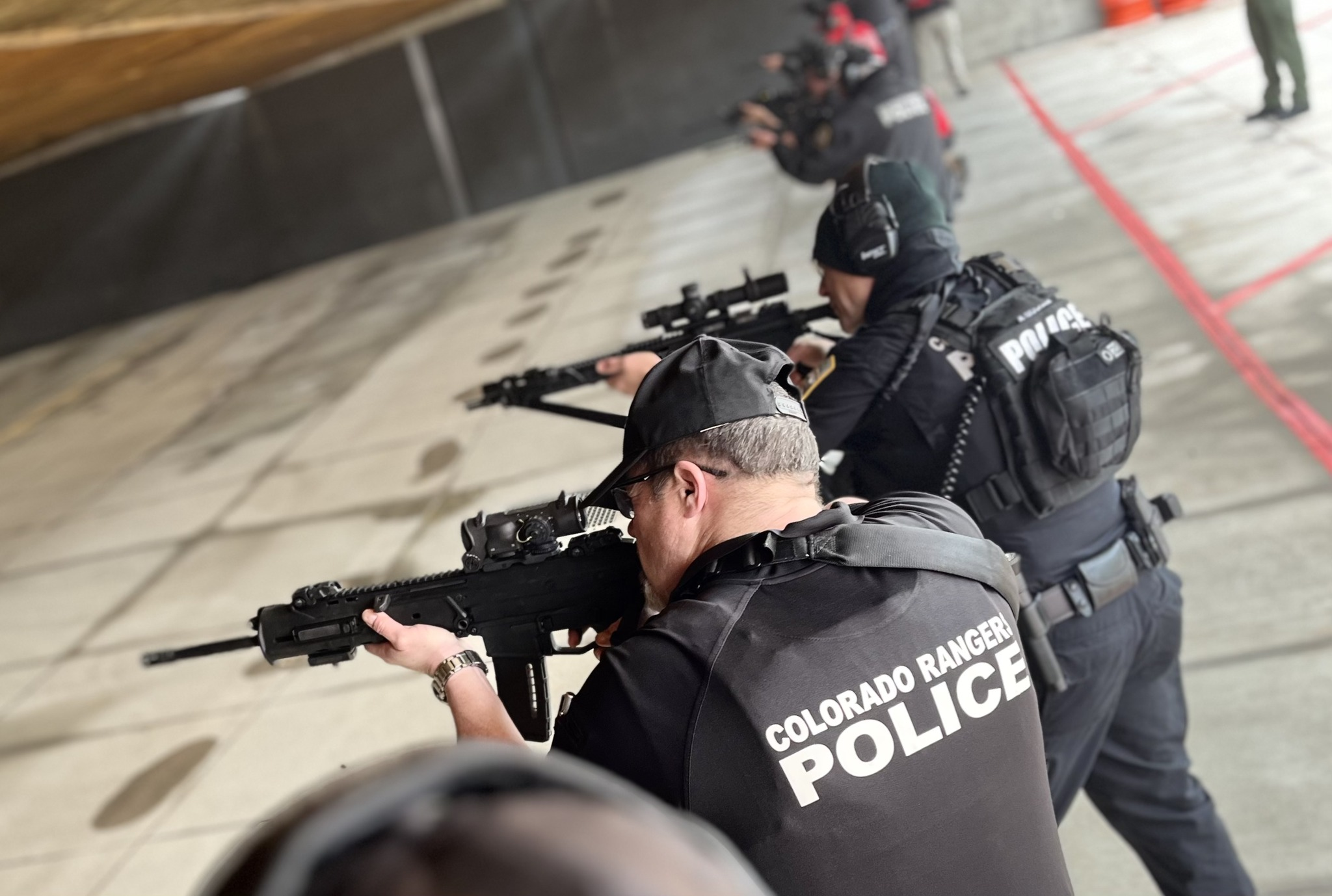
A Colorado Ranger practices firing the ACR

In January 2008, the design of the Magpul Masada was licensed to Bushmaster Firearms International and the production version of the Masada became known as the Bushmaster ACR.

The ACR was initially developed over a period of five months and was planned to replace the M16 completely independent of government funding. Prototypes were displayed at the 2007 SHOT Show in Orlando, Florida. Originally scheduled for release in the second quarter of 2008, Bushmaster announced on May 16, 2008, that the consumer release would be delayed until the first quarter of 2009, owing to a focus on military projects. On November 18, 2008, Bushmaster released a statement saying, "The ACR is being redesigned to be a superior offering to compete for the next generation U.S. Army infantry carbine and subcompact weapon requirement and will be available to select customers in 2009".

Bushmaster Firearms, with the help of Remington Arms, (a sister company in the Freedom Group, Inc. portfolio that includes Bushmaster, Remington, Marlin, and DPMS Panther Arms brands) have also made extensive design changes based on extensive environmental and functional testing specifically to meet the emerging requirements of the U.S. military in both the carbine and subcompact rifle versions of the ACR family. They made sure that the ACR will be capable to endure certain conditions such as exposure to sand, dirt, mud, and water.

The initial design of the ACR was offered in the Army's Individual Carbine competition. In late 2011, Remington unveiled an improved version specifically for the competition. Improvements included a magnesium lower receiver, A2-style pistol grip, collapsible but non-foldable stock, carbine length gas system, a new barrel nut (which eliminates the quick change barrel), and a folding charging handle. These changes made the weapon 1.8lbs (.8kg) lighter. The Individual Carbine competition was cancelled before a winning weapon was chosen.

Remington also unveiled a sub-compact variant called the ACR-C Personal Defense Weapon (PDW). This version retains the features of the Individual Carbine variant, except that the folding stock was kept and the barrel was shortened to 9.5 inches. With the stock folded, it is only 19.5 inches long. Remington has replaced this variant with the ACR-PDW.

In January 2014, Bushmaster unveiled a designated marksman rifle version of the ACR. It includes the Magpul PRS adjustable stock, a longer 18.5 in (470 mm) full profile 416 stainless steel melonite coated barrel (that retains the carbine-length gas system) with 1:7 inch rifling twist, and a Geissele enhanced trigger. The DMR ACR weighs 8.75 lb (3.97 kg) and has an MSRP of $2,799.

=== Availability and recall ===
The ACR was stated to be available in the second quarter of 2010 for military, government, and commercial customers. It was available in greater quantity (tens of thousands) in the commercial marketplace in 2010. According to an official press release from Bushmaster, the rifle had a suggested retail price between $2,685–$3,061.00, twice as much as early price quotes of "around $1500". The revelation caused public outcry and dismay of the rifle from a large portion of the firearms community and potential civilian end-users. Semi-automatic versions are available to the commercial market from Bushmaster, and selective fire versions are available for military and law enforcement under the Remington name. As of April 2010, civilian market rifles were available for sale.

On October 15, 2010, Bushmaster issued a recall of all ACR rifles, instructing users to "Please immediately discontinue the use of your ACR rifle" along with instructions to contact customer support for an RMA. Bushmaster stated that the recall was issued due to "a possible firearms performance issue that may develop with a small number of ACR rifles" and goes on to state that "Bushmaster discovered a design flaw which could result in multiple rounds firing continuously when the trigger is pulled". Bushmaster has stated that it will cover all of the costs associated with repairs to recalled rifles.

=== Difficulties ===
In 2020, Freedom Group declared bankruptcy, forcing it to close both Bushmaster and Remington. The closures also ended plans to market the ACRs by both companies.

=== Emergence ===
In 2021, Bushmaster announced that they are open in Carson City and are working on reintroducing the ACR.

=== Operational Use ===
The Bushmaster ACR was known to be used in 2012 by Polish soldiers under the Służba Wywiadu Wojskowego (Military Intelligence Service).

=== Marketing ===
In October 2023, it was reported that Remington signed a previously undisclosed deal with Activision to have the Remington ACR promoted in Call of Duty: Modern Warfare 2 in 2009. According to the Wall Street Journal, no money was exchanged as part of the agreement.

== Design details ==
=== Remington ACR ===
The Remington ACR is a gas operated, selective fire rifle only available for the military and law enforcement market that features a modular design. It has several features of other recent designs, such as the M16 and FN SCAR. The ACR's modularity allows the user to change the bolt head, barrel, and magazine in order to switch calibers. Remington released the ACR in 5.56×45mm NATO, then later produced a 6.8mm Remington SPC conversion kit, and a 6.5mm Grendel conversion was planned but was never produced.

All of the ACR's parts can be easily stripped for cleaning and all of its controls are fully ambidextrous. A three position (safe, semi-auto and full auto) fire selector lever is located over the pistol grip. A charging handle can be installed on either side of the receiver and does not reciprocate when the weapon is fired. Magazine release button is also ambidextrous. Spent case ejection port is located on the right side of the receiver, however it has a case deflector, which propels the cases away from left-handed shooters.

The ACR can also be configured for different handguards, stocks and trigger groups. Stock options include a fixed adjustable (in terms of length of pull and cheek weld), folding adjustable (folding and six-position telescoping), and sniper stock based on the Magpul PRS stock. The Remington's handguard model has a five-sided aluminium handguard that can be user configured with MIL-STD-1913 rail elements, while the Bushmaster's model is polymer with heat guards and attachable aluminium tri-rail.

The magazine designed for the 5.56×45mm NATO version of the rifle is called the Magpul PMag, a high-impact, 30-round, polymer magazine claimed by Magpul to be significantly more resistant to wear, shock, and harsh environments than other counterparts on the market. The PMag is STANAG 4179-compatible, as it will readily fit any STANAG magazine firearm, including the M16 rifle family.

The rifle is available with four barrel lengths and can be easily converted from a standard rifle (with a 16.5 inch barrel) into a carbine (with a 14.5 inch barrel), into a compact rifle (with a 10.5 inch barrel), or into a designated marksman rifle (with an 18-inch barrel) without any tools. Barrel lengths of the two calibres are exactly the same. The Barrels are hammer-forged and hardened with a nitriding process rather than having chrome plated bores as some other rifles.

=== Bushmaster ACR ===
The Bushmaster ACR is a gas operated, semi-automatic rifle of modular design. It utilises an aluminium alloy upper receiver, with polymer pistol grip, trigger, and magazine housing (lower receiver) unit which is attached to the upper receiver using cross-pins. It is available for the civilian market in 5.56×45mm NATO, 6.8mm Remington SPC and .450 Bushmaster via conversion kits. A 7.62×39mm conversion kit was done by Templar Precision.

The trigger/manual safety unit is made as a single removable item, and mostly utilises AR-15 compatible parts. The rifle features a quick-detachable barrel, with its own short-stroke gas piston attached. To remove the barrel (for change, inspection, or maintenance), the operator has to remove the polymer handguards, then swing down the wire lever which is located below the barrel, and then turning the barrel to unlock and pull it forward and out of the receiver. All barrels are free-floated within the handguard to achieve consistent accuracy. The barrel is like an AR-15 barrel with a resized gas port and a thin profile for the piston support. The bolt group also is made as a single unit, with captive return spring and rotary multi-lug bolt which locks directly to the barrel breech.

The standard magazine housing, which is suited to accept AR-15 type magazines, has ambidextrous magazine release buttons. The ambidextrous bolt stop release button is located at the front of the trigger guard. Safety lever is also ambidextrous, and charging handle can be installed on either side of the rifle. It can be equipped with various Magpul-made buttstocks, fixed or side-folding, and adjustable for length of pull (some also with adjustable cheek rest). It can be fitted with removable iron sights and/or with any optical- or night vision- sights, all depending on the user's preference or with the configuration of the rifle. It also has an integral Picatinny rail on the top of the receiver and additional accessory rails can be installed on the forend according to user preferences.

The Bushmaster's handguard model is polymer with heat guards and attachable aluminum tri-rail, while Remington's model has a five-sided aluminum handguard that can be user-configured with MIL-STD-1913 rail elements.

== Variants ==
=== Remington ACR ===
The Remington ACR is a selective-fire modular rifle that is only available for the military and law enforcement market in 5.56×45mm NATO, and a conversion kit available in 6.8mm Remington SPC.

ACR – 14.5 in (368mm) barrel, 16.5 in (419mm) barrel.

ACR-PDW – 8.25 in (210mm) barrel, 10.5 in (267mm) barrel.

=== Bushmaster ACR ===
The Bushmaster ACR is a modular semi-automatic rifle that is available for the civilian market in 5.56×45mm NATO, 6.8mm Remington SPC, .450 Bushmaster and .300 AAC Blackout.

ACR BASIC – 16.5 in (419mm) barrel.

ACR ENHANCED – 16.5 in (419mm) barrel.

ACR DMR – 18.5 in (470mm) barrel.

ACR SBR – 10.5 in (267mm) barrel.

== Users ==
- Poland: Bushmaster ACRs are used by the SWW (Military Intelligence Service). The ACRs are equipped with 266 mm or 368 mm barrels, EoTech XPS3 holographic sights, Laser Devices DBAL-A2 laser sights and Magpul P-Mag magazines.
- Ukraine: Remington ACRs are used by Armed Forces of Ukraine during Russo-Ukrainian War.

== See also ==
- CZ 805 BREN
- FB MSBS Grot
- Robinson Armament XCR
