= M4 carbine =

American assault rifle

Carbine, Caliber 5.56 mm, M4
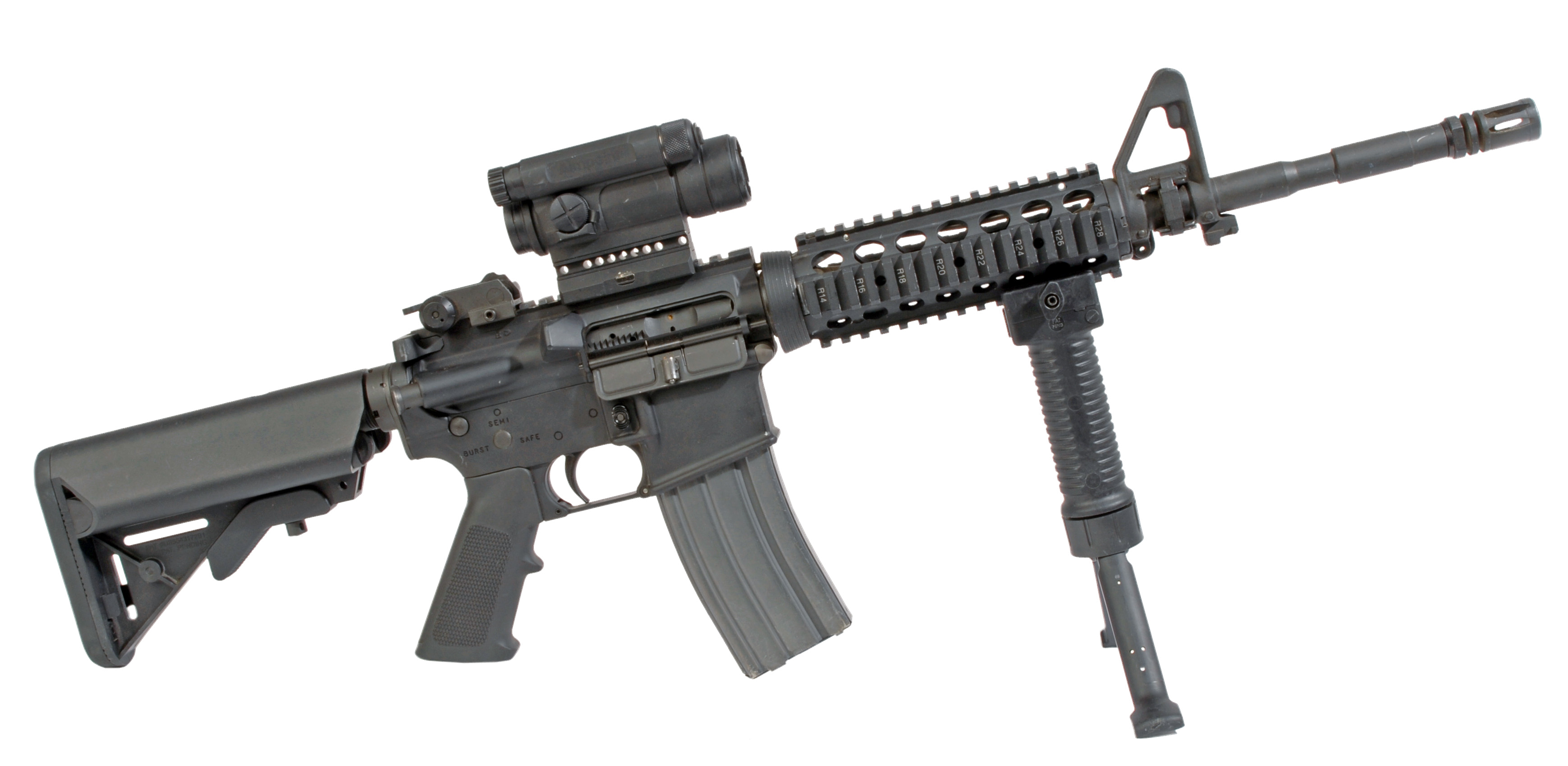
- Colt M4 carbine with RAS, M68 CCO
- Type: Assault rifle; Carbine
- Place of origin: United States

Service history
- In service: 1994–present
- Used by: See Users
- Wars: See Conflicts

Production history
- Designed: 1982–1993
- Manufacturer: Colt's Manufacturing Company; FN Herstal
- Unit cost: $700 (avg. cost) in 2012 $647 per unit in 2015
- Produced: 1987–present
- No. built: 500,000 (as of 2021)
- Variants: See Variants

Specifications
- Mass: 6.43 lb (2.92 kg) empty; 7.75 lb (3.52 kg) with 30 rounds loaded magazine and sling
- Length: 33 in (838 mm) (stock extended); 29.75 in (756 mm) (stock retracted)
- Barrel length: 14.5 in (368 mm)
- Cartridge: 5.56×45mm NATO
- Action: Gas-operated, closed rotating bolt, Stoner bolt and carrier piston
- Rate of fire: 700–970 rounds/min cyclic
- Muzzle velocity: 2,970 ft/s (910 m/s) (M855A1 round); 2,887 ft/s (880 m/s) (M855 round); 2,986 ft/s (910 m/s) (M193 round)
- Effective firing range: 500 m (550 yd) (individual/point targets); 600 m (660 yd) (area targets)
- Maximum firing range: 3,600 m (3,900 yd)
- Feed system: 30-round detachable STANAG magazine (Note: Magazines with different capacities also available)
- Sights: Iron sights or various optics

The M4 carbine (officially Carbine, Caliber 5.56 mm, M4) is an assault rifle developed in the United States during the 1980s. It is a shortened version of the M16A2 assault rifle. The M4 is extensively used by the U.S. military, which decided to largely replace the M16 rifle in U.S. Army (starting 2010) and U.S. Marine Corps (starting 2016) combat units as the primary infantry service rifle. The M4 has been adopted by over 60 countries, and has been described as "one of the defining firearms of the 21st century".

Since its adoption in 1994, the M4 has undergone over 90 modifications to improve the weapon's adaptability, ergonomics and modularity, including the M4A1 variant, which possesses a thicker barrel and a replacement of the burst-fire control group with a fully automatic one; the SOPMOD, an accessory kit containing optical attachments; and the underbarrel weapons such as M203 and M320 grenade launchers to the Masterkey and M26-MASS shotguns.

In April 2022, the U.S. Army selected the M7 rifle, a variant of the SIG MCX Spear, as the winner of the Next Generation Squad Weapon Program to replace the M16/M4.

== History ==
=== Development of the M4 ===
Following the military adoption of the Armalite AR-15 as the M16 rifle, carbine variants were also adopted for CQC operations, the first of which was the CAR-15 family of weapons, which was used in the Vietnam War. However, these rifles had design issues, as the barrel length was halved to 10 inches (25 cm), which upset the ballistics, reducing its range and accuracy and leading to considerable muzzle flash and blast, meaning that a large flash suppressor had to be fitted.

In 1982, the U.S. government requested Colt to make a carbine version of the M16A2. At the time, the Colt M16A2 was also known as the Colt 645, also referred to as the M16A1E1. Later that year, the U.S. Army Armament Munitions Chemical Command helped Colt develop a new variant of the XM177E2, and the U.S. Army redesignated the XM177E2 to the XM4 Carbine, giving the name as the successor to the M3 carbine. The carbine used the same upper and lower receiver as the M16A1, and fires the M855 cartridge along with the older M193 cartridges. In 1983, the 9th Infantry Division requested a Quick Reaction Program (QRP) for a 5.56mm carbine to replace the M1 carbine and M3 submachine gun in service. The XM4 was tested by the Army's Armament Research and Development Center (ARDC) in June 1983. Later, the gun was updated with improved furniture and a barrel with rifling of 1 turn in 7 inches (180 mm). The ARDC recommended additional commonality with the M16A2 rifle, as well as lengthening the barrel to 14.5 inches (370 mm). In January 1984, the U.S. Army revised the QRP, and a month later, it formally approved development of the new carbine.

In June 1985, the Picatinny Arsenal was given a contract to produce 40 prototypes of the XM4. Initially a joint program between the Army and Marines, the Army withdrew its funding in 1986. The XM4 was finished in 1987, and the Marines adopted 892 for that fiscal year, with the designation "carbine, 5.56mm, M4". Owing to experience from the 1991 Gulf War, the Army gave Colt its first production contracts for M4 carbines in May and July 1993, and M4A1 carbines for United States Special Operations Command (SOCOM) operators in February 1994.

Interest in the M4 carbine was accelerated after the Battle of Mogadishu (1993), in which Rangers complained that their M16 rifles were "unwieldy", whereas members of Delta Force in the same battle, equipped with the CAR-15, had no such complaints. The M4 carbine first saw action in the hands of U.S. troops deployed to Kosovo in 1999 in support of the NATO-led Kosovo Force. It was subsequently used heavily by U.S. forces during the war on terror, including in Operation Enduring Freedom and the Iraq War. In the Army, the M4 had largely replaced M16A2s as the primary weapon of forward-deployed personnel by 2005. The M4 carbine also replaced most submachine guns and selected handguns in U.S. military service, as it fires more effective rifle ammunition that offers superior stopping power and is better able to penetrate modern body armor.

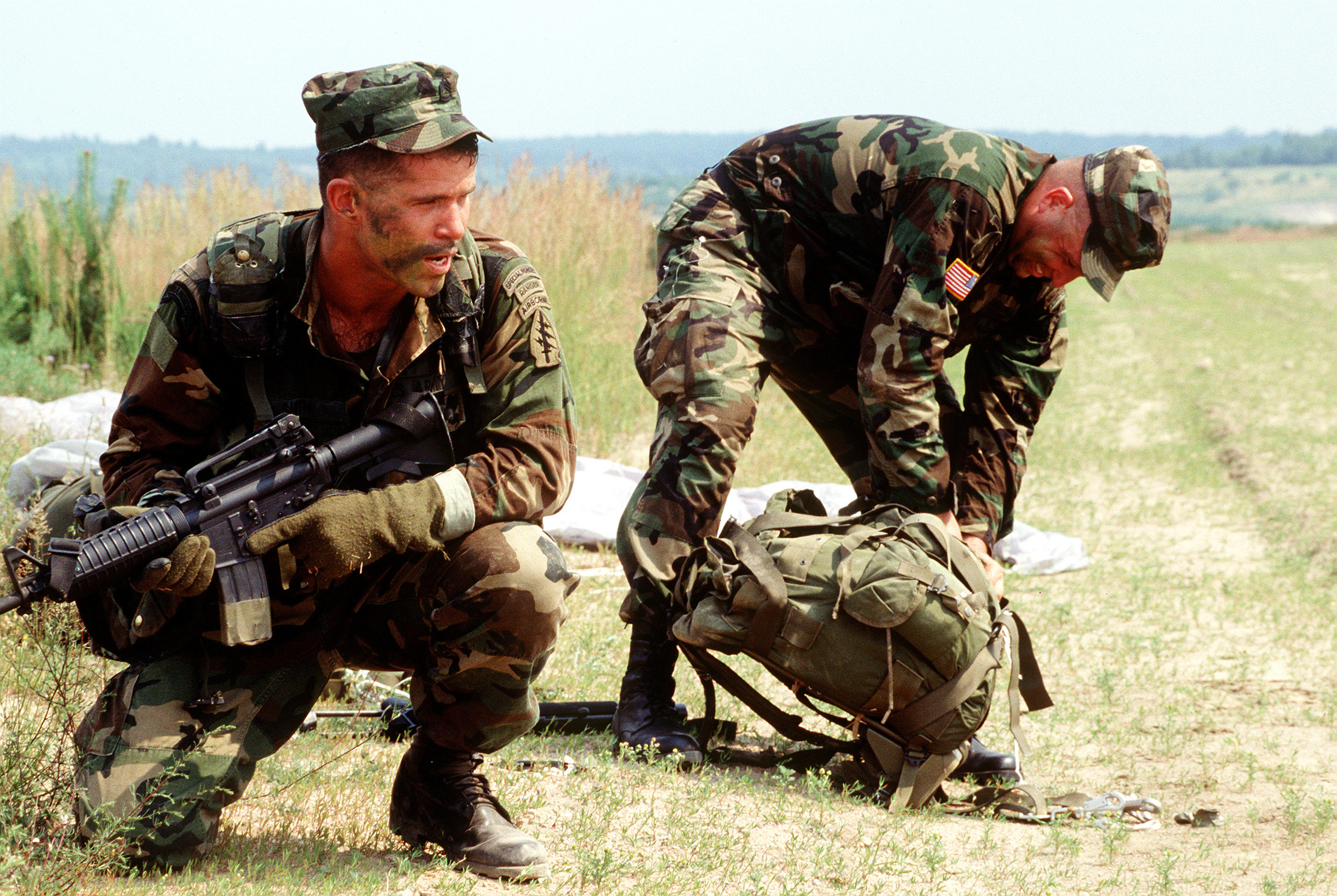
A 10th Special Forces Group soldier with an M4 carbine during an exercise in July 1995

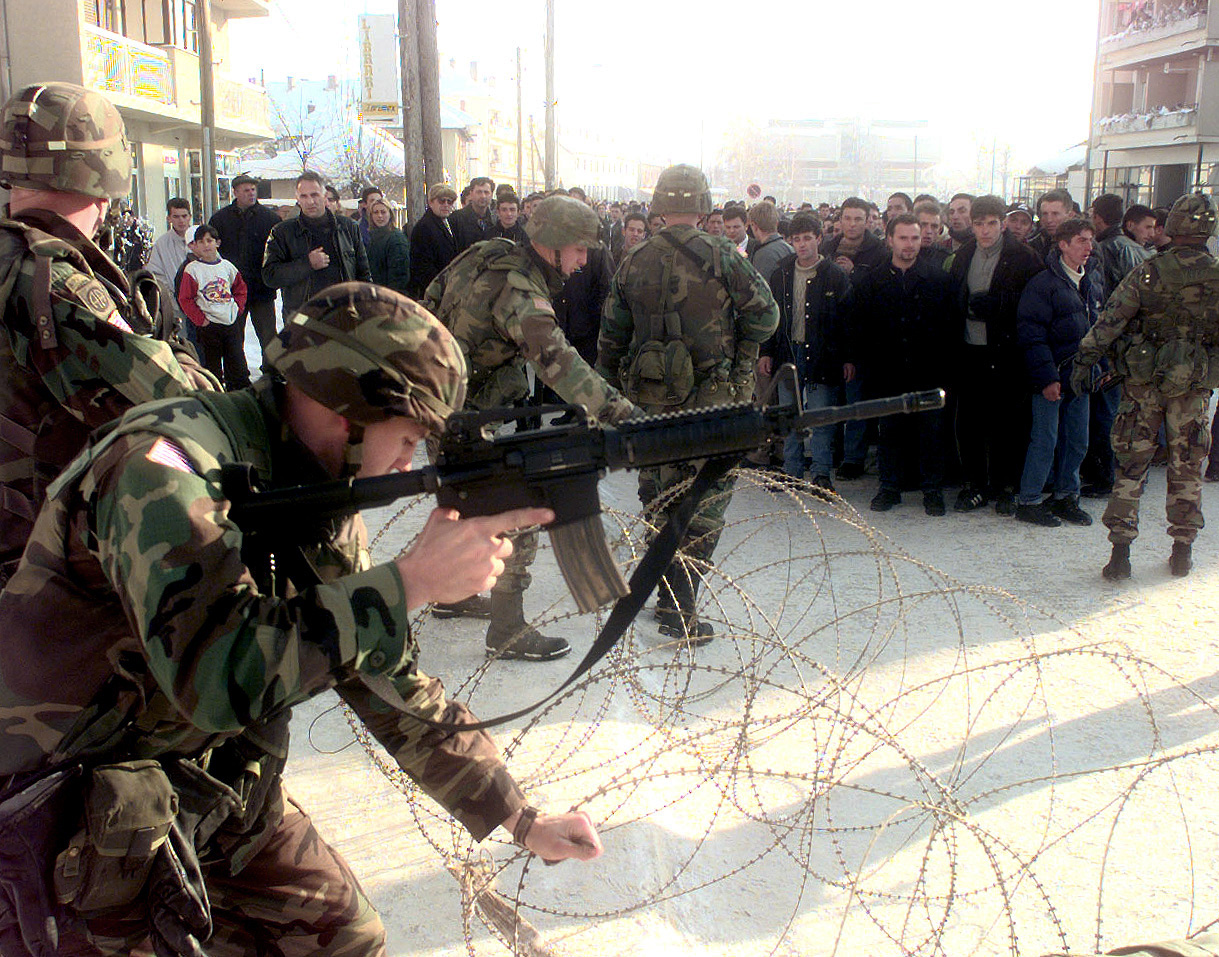
A U.S. Army 82nd Airborne soldier holds an M4 carbine in Vitina, Kosovo, in January 2000 during the NATO-led KFOR mission, the first operational use of the M4 by U.S. troops

In 2007, the USMC ordered its officers (up to the rank of lieutenant colonel) and staff non-commissioned officers to carry the M4 carbine instead of the M9 handgun. This is in keeping with the Marine Corps doctrine, "Every Marine a rifleman." The Marine Corps, however, chose the full-sized M16A4 over the M4 as its standard infantry rifle. United States Navy corpsmen E5 and below are also issued M4s instead of the M9. While ordinary riflemen in the Marine Corps were armed with M16A4s, M4s were fielded by troops in positions where a full-length rifle would be too bulky, including vehicle operators, fireteam and squad leaders. As of 2013, the U.S. Marine Corps had 80,000 M4 carbines in their inventory.

By July 2015, major Marine Corps commands were endorsing switching to the M4 over the M16A4 as the standard infantry rifle, just as the Army had done. This is because of the carbine's lighter weight, compact length, and ability to address modern combat situations that happen mostly within close quarters; if a squad needs to engage at longer ranges, the M27 Infantry Automatic Rifle can be used as a designated marksman rifle. Approval of the change would move the M16 to support personnel, while armories already had the 17,000 M4s in the inventory needed to outfit all infantrymen who needed one. In October 2015, Commandant Robert Neller formally approved of making the M4 carbine the primary weapon for all infantry battalions, security forces, and supporting schools in the USMC. The switch was to be completed by September 2016. In December 2017, the Marine Corps revealed a decision to equip every Marine in an infantry squad with the M27, while the M4 would be retained for leadership billets at the platoon level and above. MARSOC also retains the M4, as its shorter barrel is more suited to how they operate in confined spaces.

=== Improved M4 ===
In 2009, the U.S. Army took complete ownership of the M4 design. This allowed companies other than Colt to compete with their own M4 designs. The Army planned on fielding the last of its M4 requirement in 2010. In October 2009, Army weapons officials proposed a series of changes to the M4 to Congress. Requested changes included an electronic round counter that records the number of shots fired, a heavier "SOCOM barrel", and possibly replacing the Stoner expanding gas system with a gas piston system. The heavier "SOCOM barrel" was first issued to special forces operators in the early 2000s to enable greater sustained automatic fire in certain immediate-action drills, although SOCOM itself would eventually return to the standard "government profile" barrel in its subsequent M4 improvement programs.

The benefits of these changes, however, have come under scrutiny from both the military and civilian firearms community. According to a PDF detailing the M4 Carbine improvement plans released by PEO Soldier, the direct impingement gas system would be replaced only after reviews were done comparing the direct impingement system to commercial gas piston operating system to find out and use the best available operating system in the U.S. Army's improved M4A1.

In September 2010, the Army announced it would buy 12,000 M4A1s from Colt Firearms by the end of 2010, and would order 25,000 more M4A1s by early 2011. Additionally, the service branch planned to buy 12,000 M4A1 conversion kits in early 2011 and bought 65,000 more later that year. Eventually, the Army would upgrade all of its M4s to M4A1s, although the Marine Corps would largely abstain from the effort. Conversion of M4s to the M4A1 in the Army began in 2011, as part of the Product Improvement Program, which included the conversion of 300,000 M4 carbines to the M4A1. The 101st Airborne Division began fielding newly built M4A1s in 2012, and the U.S. 1st Infantry Division became the first unit to convert their M4s to M4A1 standard in May 2014. Upgrades included the heavier SOCOM barrel to better dissipate heat from sustained automatic firing, the full-auto trigger group with a more consistent trigger pull than the burst group's to enable better semi-automatic accuracy, and the ambidextrous selector lever for easier use with left-handed shooters. The M4–M4A1 conversion increases weapon weight from 7.46 lb (3.38 kg) to 7.74 lb (3.51 kg), counting a backup iron sight, forward pistol grip, empty magazine, and sling. Each carbine upgrade costs $240 per rifle, for a total cost of $120 million for half a million conversions. Three hundred conversions can be done per day to equip a brigade combat team per week, with all M4A1 conversions to be completed by 2019.

In addition to upgrade kits, in April 2012, the U.S. Army announced it would begin purchasing over 120,000 M4A1 carbines to start reequipping frontline units from the original M4 to the new M4A1 version. The first 24,000 were to be made by Remington Arms Company. Remington was to produce the M4A1s from mid-2013 to mid-2014. After completion of that contract, it was to be between Colt and Remington to produce over 100,000 more M4A1s for the U.S. Army. Because of efforts from Colt to sue the Army to force them not to use Remington to produce M4s, the Army reworked the original solicitation for new M4A1s to avoid legal issues from Colt. On 16 November 2012, Colt's protest of Remington receiving the M4A1 production contract was dismissed. Instead of the contract being re-awarded to Remington, the Army awarded the contract for 120,000 M4A1 carbines worth $77 million to FN Herstal on 22 February 2013. The order was expected to be completed by 2018.

=== Replacement efforts ===
Replacements for the M4 have mostly focused on two factors: improving its reliability, and its penetration. The first attempt to find a replacement for the M4 came in 1986, with the Advanced Combat Rifle program, in which the caseless Heckler & Koch G11 and various flechette rifles were tested, but this was quickly dropped as these designs were mostly prototypes, which demonstrated a lack of reliability. In the 1990s, the Objective Individual Combat Weapon competition was put forth to find a replacement for the M4. Two designs were produced, both by Heckler & Koch: the XM29 OICW, which incorporated a smart grenade launcher, but was canceled in 2004 as it was too heavy, and the XM8, which was canceled in 2005 as it did not offer significant enough improvements over the M4.

The Heckler & Koch HK416 was introduced in 2005, incorporating the same lower receiver as the M4A1, but replacing its direct impingement system with a gas-operated rotating bolt, more comparable to that of the G36. The HK416 was adopted by the Navy SEALs, Delta Force, and other special forces. In 2010, it was adopted by the Marines as the M27 Infantry Automatic Rifle. The same year, the Rangers and Navy SEALs adopted the FN SCAR, but later withdrew their purchase, as it was not a significant enough improvement over the M4A1.

==== Individual Carbine ====
The U.S. Army briefly had a tender in 2011 called the Individual Carbine, which solicited proposals for a potential M4 carbine replacement, but this was canceled in 2013 after determining that none of the entrants offered an adequate improvement over the M4.

For the Individual Carbine competition, Colt submitted their Enhanced M4 design, also known as the Colt Advanced Piston Carbine (APC). The weapon has a suppression-ready fluted barrel, which is lighter and cools better than previous M4 barrels. It is claimed to have "markedly better" accuracy. To improve reliability, Colt used an articulating link piston (ALP), which "reduces the inherent stress in the piston stroke by allowing for deflection and thermal expansion". In traditional short-stroke gas piston operating systems designed for the AR platform, the force of the piston striking the bolt carrier can push the bolt carrier downwards and into the wall of the buffer tube, leading to accelerated wear and even chipped metal. This is known as carrier tilt. The ALP allows the operating rod to wiggle to correct for the downward pressure on the bolt and transfers the force straight backwards in line with the bore and buffer assembly, eliminating the carrier tilt. This relieves stress on parts and helps to increase accuracy. The Individual Carbine competition was canceled before a winning weapon was chosen.

==== Next Generation Squad Weapon ====
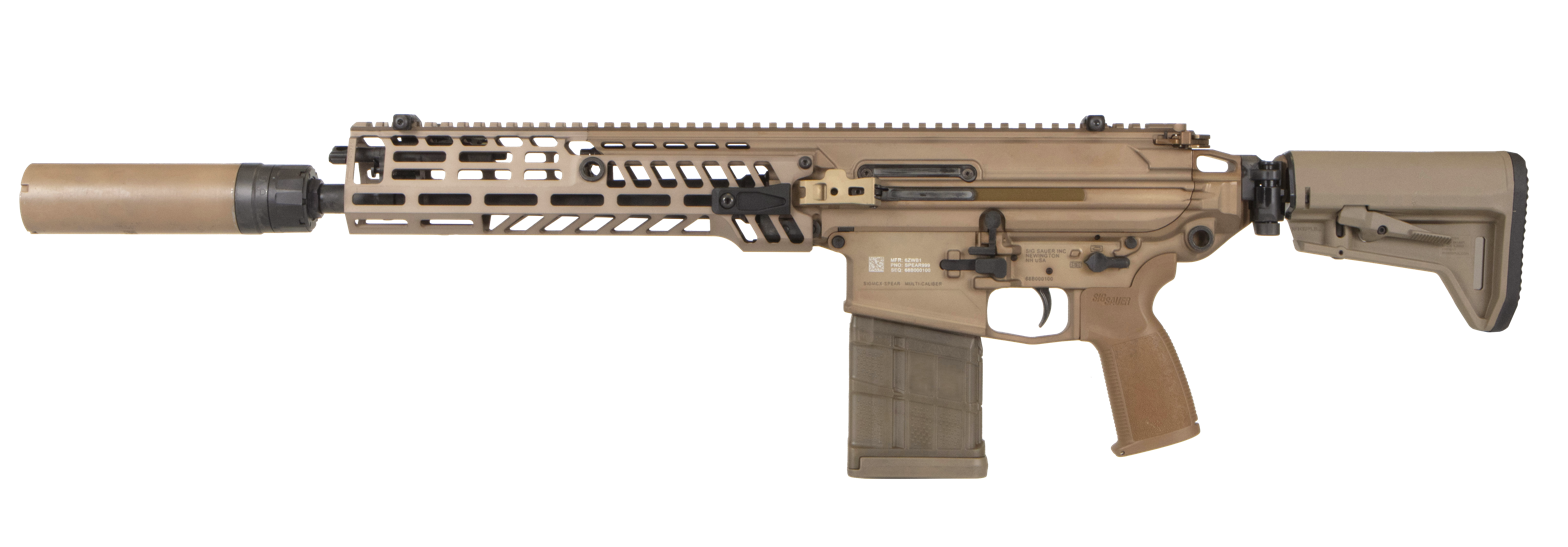
SIG Sauer XM7, caliber 6.8×51mm (.277 in)

After the failure of the Individual Carbine program, the Next Generation Squad Weapon (NGSW) was started in 2017. The program aimed to replace the M4 Carbine and the M249 SAW with weapons that would compensate for their perceived deficiencies when fighting at longer ranges, as well as addressing concerns about the effectiveness of traditional 5.56×45mm ammunition against troops wearing body armor in a future peer or near-peer conflict. In order to achieve these goals, all weapon submissions were to be chambered in a new 6.8x51mm caliber. SIG Sauer, Textron Systems, FN Herstal, True Velocity (previously Lonestar Future Weapons and General Dynamics), and PCP Tactical took part in the program. Textron submitted a cased-telescoped (CT) ammunition-firing rifle for the program; FN Herstal submitted their HAMR IAR re-chambered in 6.8mm caliber; PCP Tactical submitted a modified Desert Tech MDRx; SIG Sauer submitted a redesigned MCX variant known as the MCX-SPEAR. In early 2022, the program concluded, with SIG Sauer being declared the winner. Their rifle entry was designated the XM5 (later changed to XM7 to avoid confusion with the Colt M5), and the XM250 Squad Automatic Weapon. Operational testing and fielding were scheduled for 2024.

== Design ==
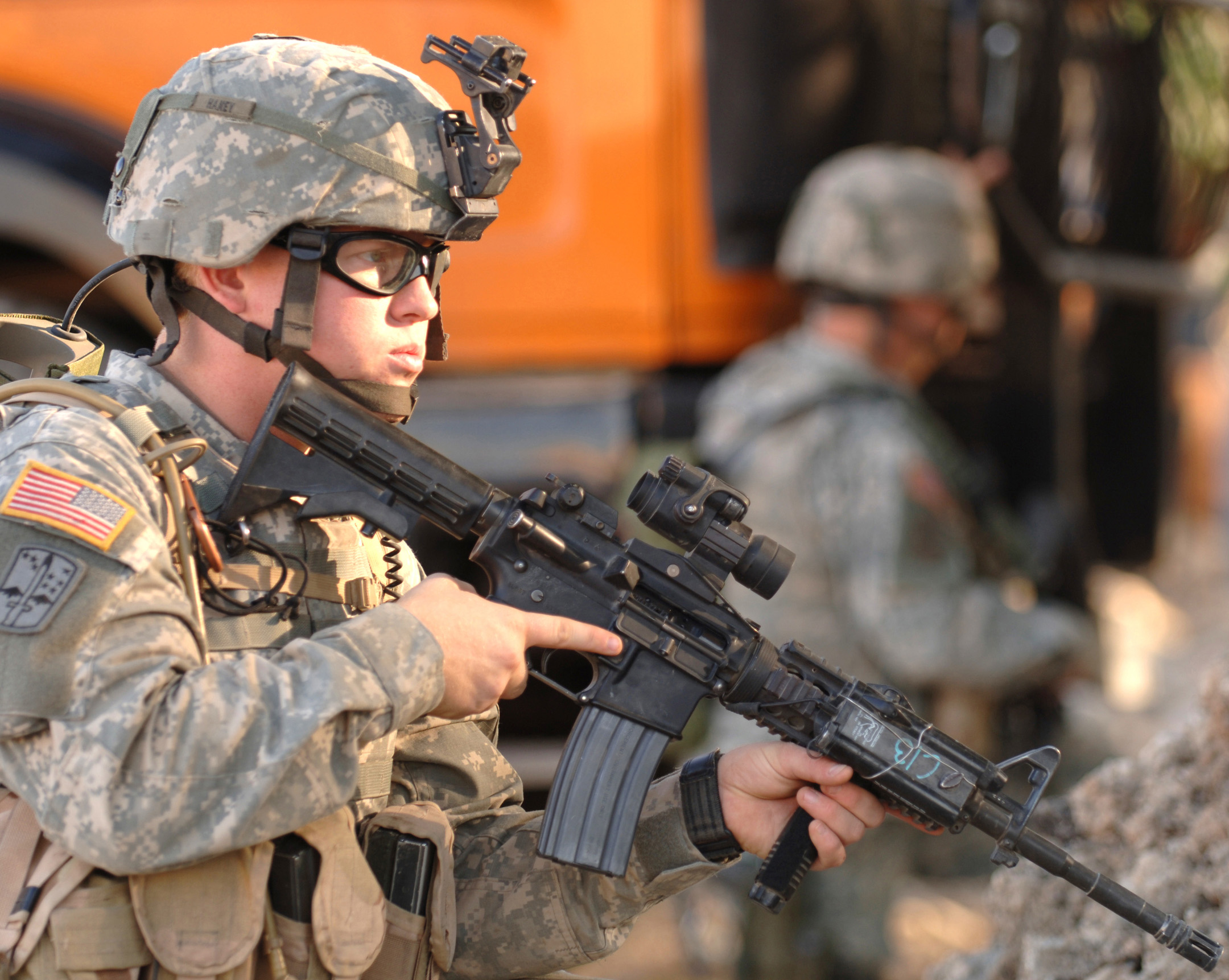
M4 with M68 Close Combat Optic and AN/PAQ-4

The M4, and its variants, is a lightweight 5.56×45mm NATO (and .223 Remington) caliber, gas-operated, magazine-fed, air-cooled selective fire AR-15-pattern firearm. Its direct impingement gas operation consists of a rotating bolt, and bolt carrier that reciprocates into a receiver extension that is inline with the barrel. The gas system, bolt carrier, and bolt-locking design is ammunition specific, since it does not have an adjustable gas port or valve to adjust the weapon to various propellant and projectile or barrel length specific pressure behavior. The receiver is made of forged 7075-T6 aluminum, while the 14.5 in (368 mm) barrel, bolt, bolt carrier, and fire control group are made of steel; these components can be easily serviced and replaced by unit armories, enabling the addition of enhanced components and thus making the platform readily upgradable. The flattop upper receiver's Picatinny rail enables the replacement of the removable carrying handle with various optics. The furniture, including the buttstock, grip, and handguard are made of reinforced plastic, although the modular nature of the weapon means that these can be swapped by the end user. The receiver extension can accommodate either a multi-position telescoping stock or a fixed A2 or LE tactical stock. (Note: The first stock fitted onto the M4 in 1985 was made entirely of plastic, which only had two positions; fully closed or fully extended. Later models have greater adjustability, and are commonly known as the "six position stock", "M4 stock", or, because of its recesses, "waffle stock".) The M4 is a shorter and lighter variant of the M16A2 rifle, sharing much of the same operation mechanisms and has 80% parts commonality; the chief differences are a shorter barrel of 14.5 inches rather than 20 inches as well as a shortened receiver extension and buffer.

Two fire control groups exist for the M4 family, the three-round burst for the baseline model and fully automatic for the M4A1. Some M4A1 may also have a heavier-profile barrel initially developed for SOCOM for prolonged automatic fire; models with this heavier "SOCOM profile" barrel use the same M4A1 designation, and existing weapons can swap to the heavier-profile barrel at the unit armory level. Despite being its namesake, SOCOM itself has reverted to the original lighter "government profile" barrel while adopting a longer "mid-length" gas system with its newer Upper Receiver Group-Improved (URG-I) modifications. As the modifications only affect the upper receiver assembly, rifles with the URG-I still retain the M4A1 designation.

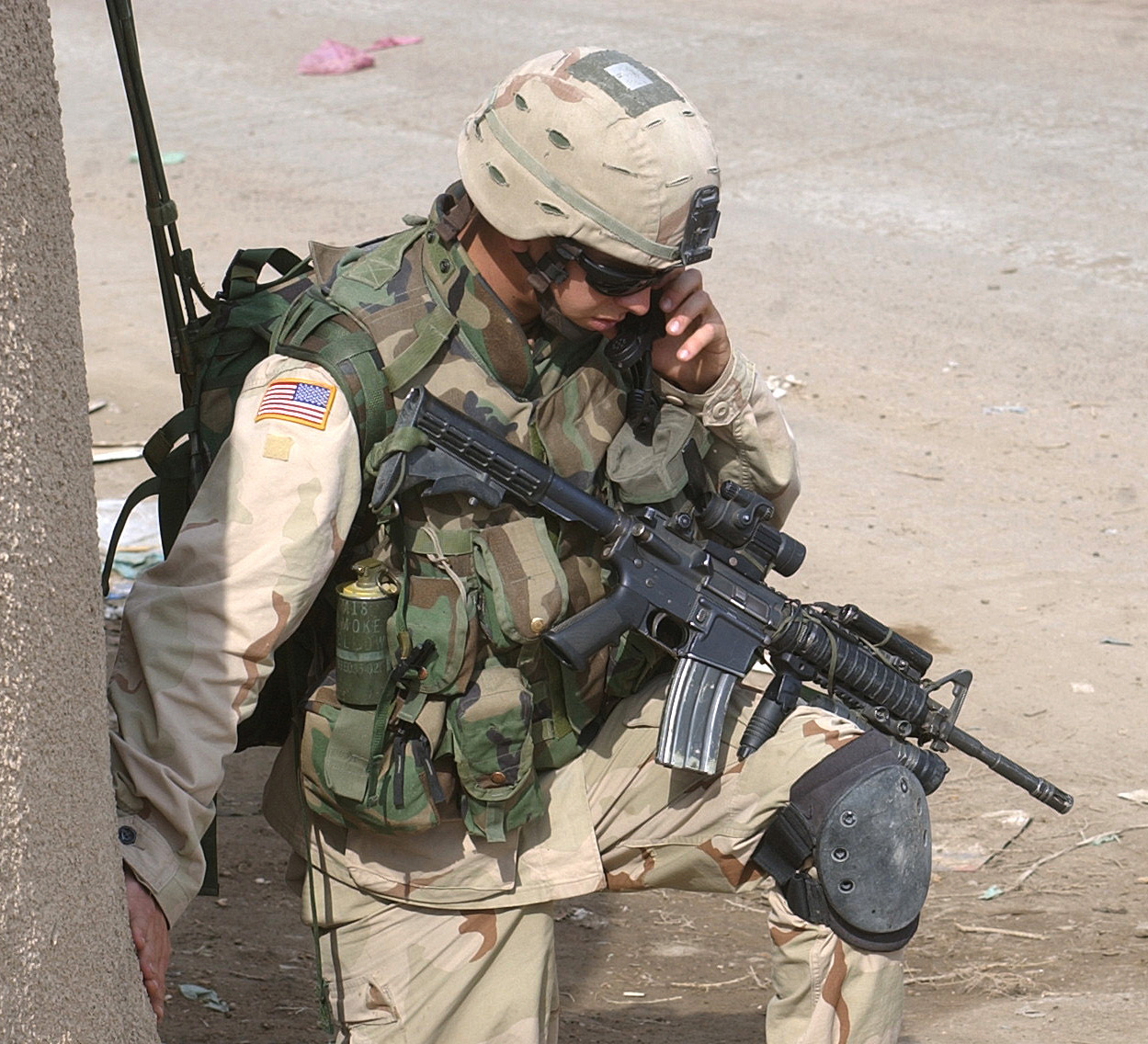
M4 with the newer, redesigned telescoping stock

The M4's maneuverability makes it beneficial for non-infantry troops (vehicle crews, clerks and staff officers), as well as for close-quarters battle. The M4, along with the M16A4, has mostly replaced the M16A2 in the Army and Marines. The U.S. Air Force, for example, has transitioned completely to the M4 for Security Forces squadrons, while other armed personnel retain the M16A2. The U.S. Navy uses M4A1s for Special Operations and vehicle crews. However, the M4's shorter barrel reduces its range, with its rear iron sights integrated in the (removable) carry handle only adjustable from 300 m (328 yd) up to 600 m (656 yd), compared to the M16A2 rear iron sights integrated in the fixed carry handle, which can reach up to 800 m (875 yd).

=== Accessories ===
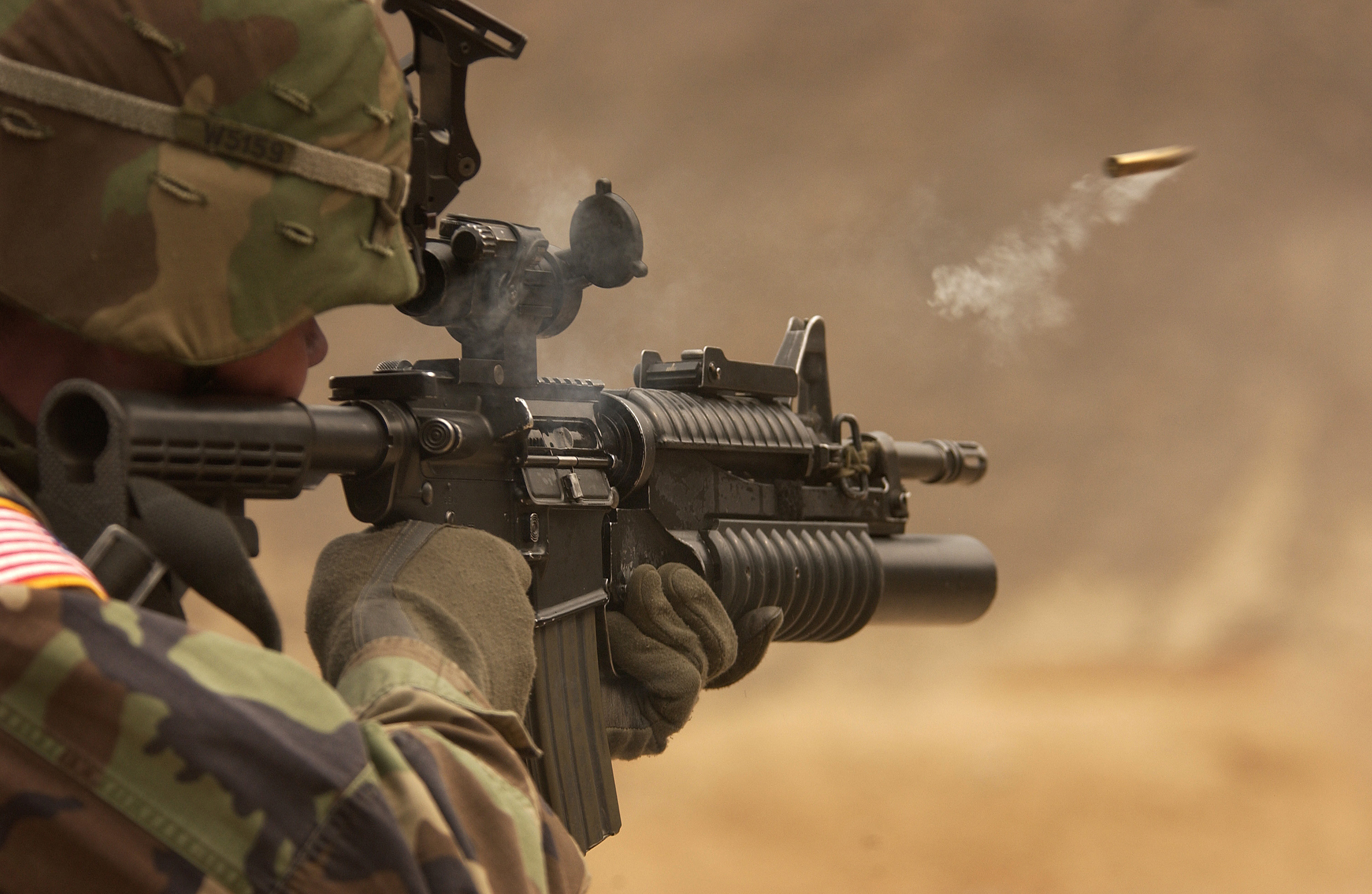
M4A1 just after firing, with an ejected case in mid-air; the M203 and M68 CCO are attached

Like all the variants of the M16, the M4 and the M4A1 can be fitted with many accessories, such as slings, night-vision devices, flash suppressors, suppressors, laser sights, telescopic sights, bipods, M9 bayonet, either M203 or M320 grenade launcher, M26-MASS shotgun, forward hand grips, a detachable rail-mounted carrying handle, or anything else compatible with a MIL-STD-1913 picatinny rail.

Other common accessories include the AN/PEQ-2, AN/PEQ-15 multi-mode laser, AN/PEQ-16 Mini Integrated Pointing Illumination Module (MIPIM), Trijicon TA01 and TA31 Advanced Combat Optical Gunsights (ACOG), EOTech 550 series holographic sights, and Aimpoint M68 Close Combat Optic. Visible and infrared lights of various manufacturers are commonly attached using various mounting methods. As with all versions of the M16, the M4 accepts a blank-firing attachment (BFA) for training purposes.

The M4 and the M4A1 feed from 30-round STANAG magazines. Other types of STANAG compatible magazines with different capacities may also be used. In January 2017, a USMC unit deployed with suppressors mounted to every infantry M4 service weapon. Exercises showed that having all weapons suppressed improved squad communication and surprise during engagements; disadvantages included additional heat and weight, increased maintenance, and the greater cost of equipping so many troops with the attachment. In July 2020, the Marine Corps announced it would be ordering suppressors for use by all M4 carbines used by close-combat units. The Marines began to roll out suppressors for all M4/M4A1 carbines in infantry, reconnaissance and special operations units in December 2020.

==== Special Operations Peculiar Modification ====
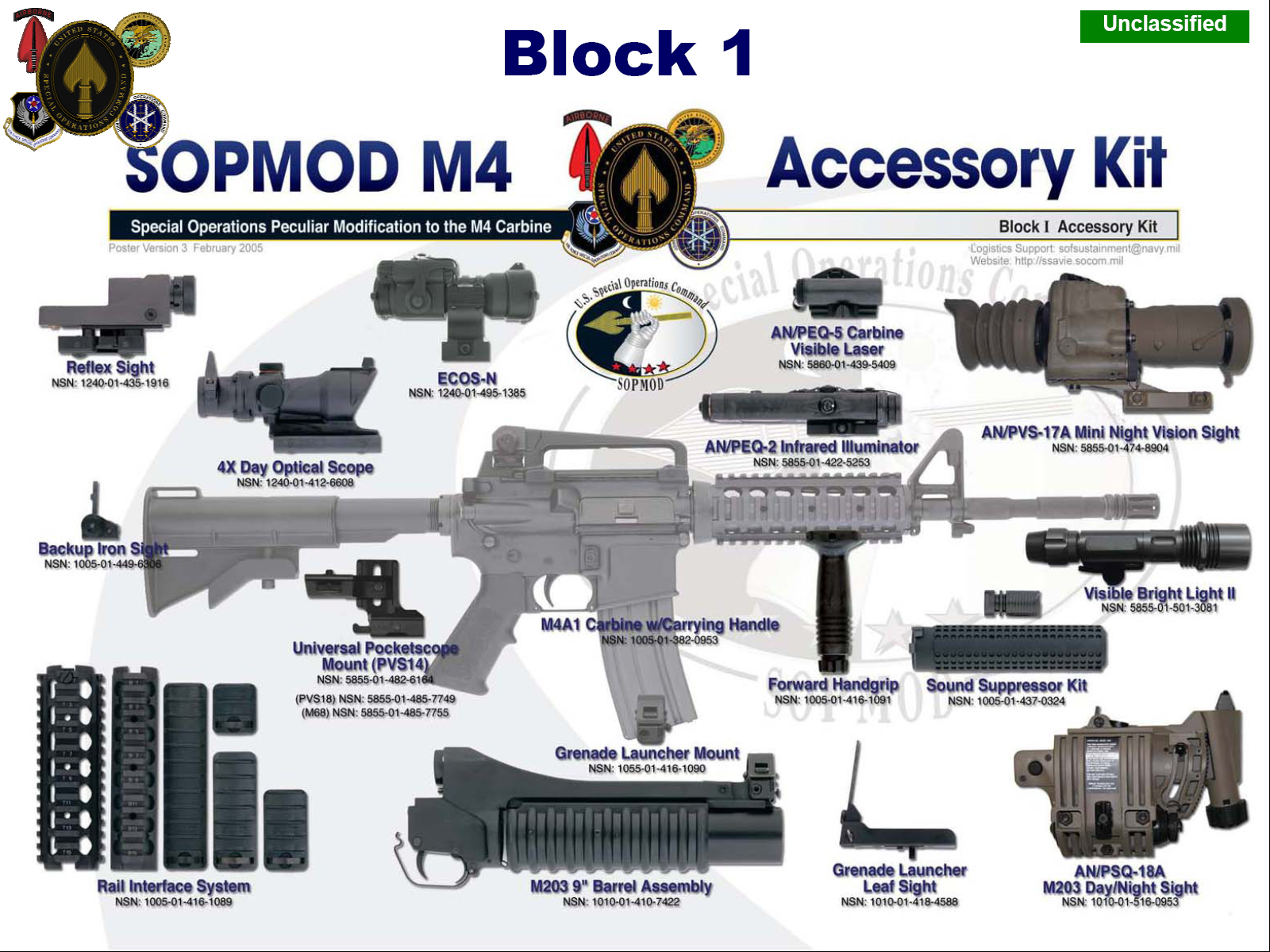
SOPMOD (Special Operations Peculiar Modification) Block I

In 1992, U.S. Special Operations Command (USSOCOM) developed the Special Operations Peculiar Modification (SOPMOD) Block I kit for the carbines used by U.S. Special Operations Forces units operating under its command. The kit features an M4A1, a Rail Interface System (RIS) handguard developed by Knight's Armament Company (KAC), a shortened quick-detachable M203 grenade launcher and leaf sight, a KAC sound suppressor, a KAC backup rear sight, an Insight Technologies AN/PEQ-2A visible laser/infrared designator, along with Trijicon's ACOG TA-01NSN model and Reflex sights, and a night vision sight, among many other accessories. This kit was designed to be configurable (modular) for various missions, and the kit is currently in service with special operations units.

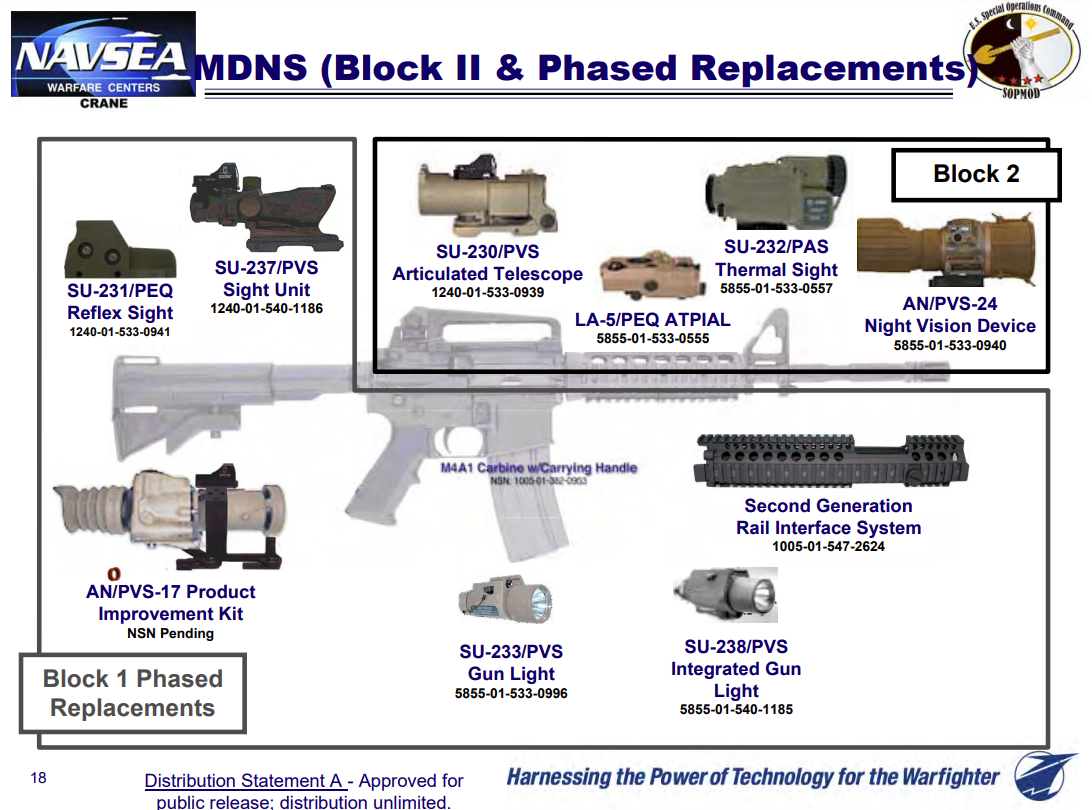
SOPMOD Block II and Phased Replacements

In 2002, the Block II modification kit was adopted featuring two new upper receivers: the Special Purpose Receiver (SPR) with a 16 or 18 in (406 or 457 mm) barrel and Close Quarter Battle Receiver (CQBR) with a 10.3 in (262 mm) barrel. M4A1s fitted with the SPR were designated by the Navy as the Mk 12 Special Purpose Rifle, a type of designated marksman rifle. M4A1s with the CQBR were designated the Mk 18 Mod 0. The Block II program then focused on component improvements to the M4A1, with the adoption of the heavier "SOCOM profile" barrel in 2004 and free-float Rail Interface System II (RIS-II) handguard from Daniel Defense in 2008. Owing to the modularity of the AR-15/M4 platform, some operators have replaced issued optics, handguards, and buttstocks with aftermarket ones.

In 2018, the Upper Receiver Group-Improved (URG-I) modification kit (unofficially the Block III) was approved for the conversion of Block I and Block II carbine's upper receiver "to an improved barrel and rail assembly" which includes a lighter free-float handguard from Geissele Automatics that incorporates the Magpul Industries M-LOK rail interface system. The URG-I also replaces the Block II's heavier barrel with a standard "government profile" cold hammer forged barrel with a longer gas system.

== Variants ==
The initial order of M4 carbines had a fixed carrying handle and rear sight similar to the M16A2. The flattop upper receiver with the Picatinny rail was introduced with the M4A1 variant in 1994, and all subsequent orders for all M4 variants would have a flattop upper receiver. Variants of the carbine built by different manufacturers are also in service with many other foreign special forces units, such as the Australian Special Air Service Regiment (SASR). While the SASR uses weapons of essentially the same pattern built by Colt for export (Colt uses different models to separate weapons for the U.S. military and those for commercial/export purposes), the British Special Air Service uses a variant on the basic theme, the Colt Canada C8SFW.

=== M4 MWS (Modular Weapon System) ===
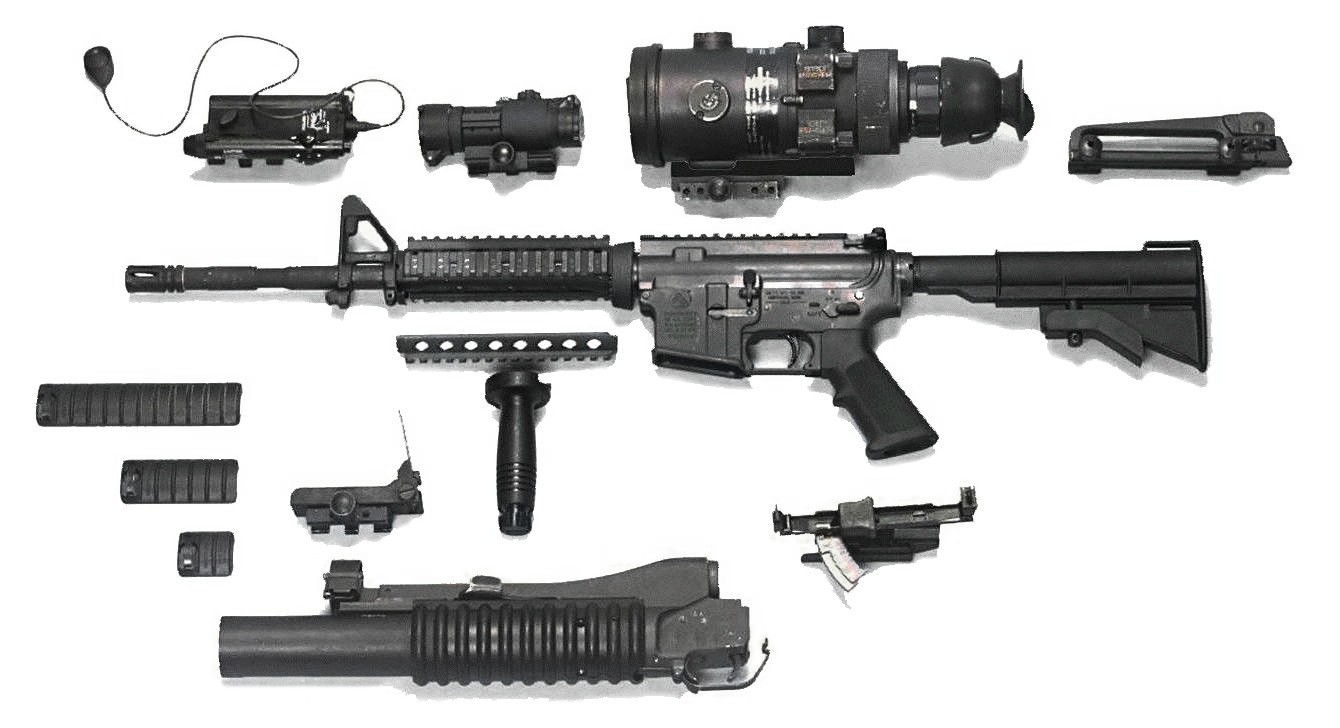
M4 MWS (Modular Weapon System) shown with various accessories including M203 grenade launcher, RIS foregrip, removable carry handle/rear sight assembly, AN/PAQ-4 laser system, M68 CCO reflex sight, and the AN/PVS-4 night vision optics

Colt Model 925 carbines were tested and fitted with the KAC M4 RAS under the designation M4E2, but this designation appears to have been scrapped in favor of mounting this system to existing carbines without changing the designation. The U.S. Army Field Manual specifies for the Army that adding the Rail Adapter System (RAS) turns the weapon into the M4 MWS or modular weapon system.

=== M4A1 ===
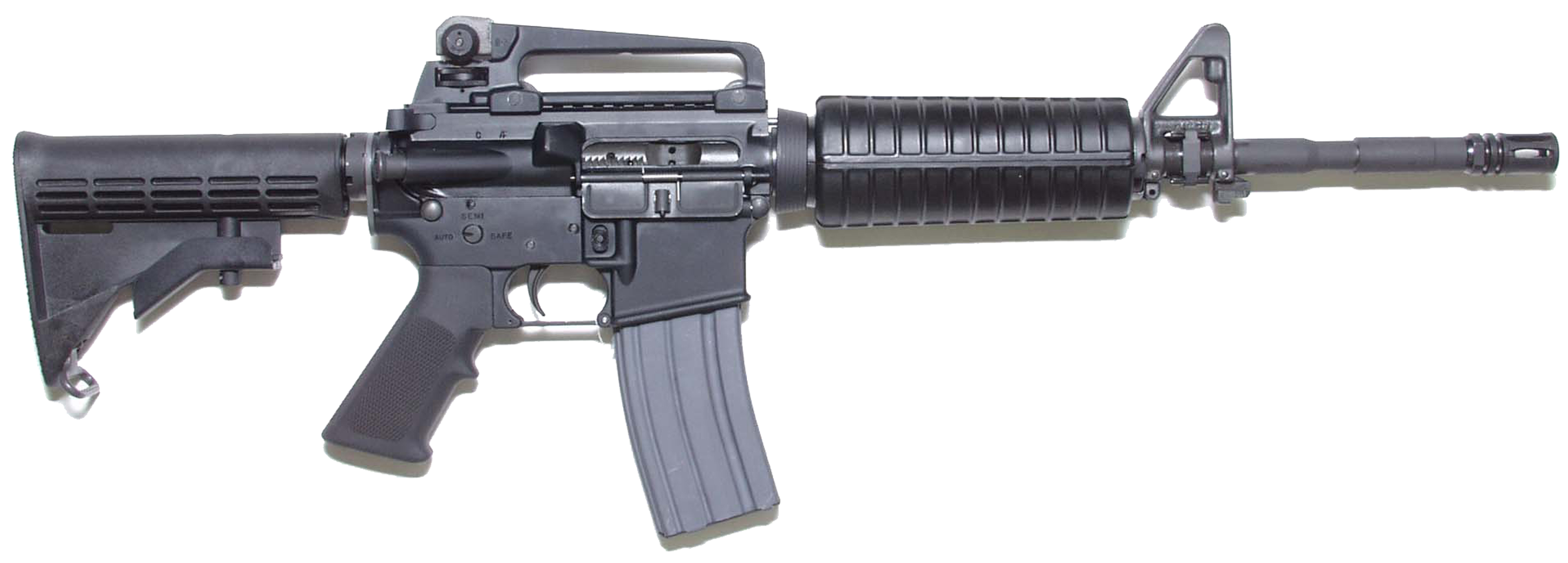
M4A1 with a carry handle

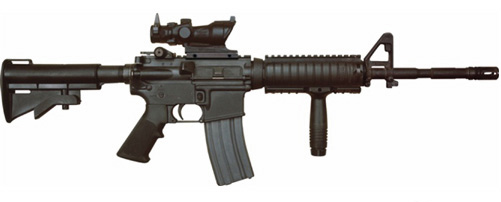
M4A1 with TA01NSN ACOG 4×32 optical sight

The M4A1 carbine is a fully automatic variant of the basic M4 carbine. The M4A1 was developed in May 1991 and entered service in 1994; starting in 2014 the U.S. Army began upgrading all of its existing M4s to the M4A1 standard. The M4A1 was the first M4 model with the removable carry handle. The M4A1 has a "S-1-F" (safe/semi-automatic/fully automatic) trigger group, while the M4 has a "S-1-3" (safe/semi-automatic/3-round burst) trigger group. The M4A1 is used by almost all U.S. special operation units and is the standard service rifle across the U.S. Army (including conventional forces). It has a maximum effective range of 500 to 600 meters (550–660 yd). The fully automatic trigger gives a more consistent trigger pull, which leads to better accuracy. According to Mark Westrom, owner of ArmaLite, Inc., automatic fire is better for clearing rooms than burst fire.

A subvariant of the M4A1 uses a heavier barrel than the standard M4, as the regular M4 barrel, which can fire 6,000 rounds before requiring inspection for possible replacement, was not sufficient for the higher consumption of ammunition by SOCOM operators. The redesigned barrel, colloquially referred to as the "SOCOM barrel", has an increased diameter in the area between the receiver and front sight. Despite the different barrel profile, this subvariant did not receive a new designation, and was still referred to as the M4A1. Ironically, SOCOM itself would dispense with its namesake heavier barrel and return to the original "government profile" with its Upper Receiver Group-Improved (URG-I) program's mid-length gassed, cold hammer forged barrels.

=== Mk 18 CQBR ===
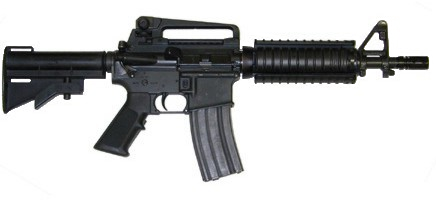
M4A1 lower receiver with a Mk 18 Close Quarter Battle Receiver upper. The barrel length is 10.3 in (260 mm)

The Close Quarters Battle Receiver (CQBR) was originally a Special Operations Peculiar Modification (SOPMOD) program item that would increase the close quarters maneuverability of the M4A1 by mating the lower receiver with a 10.3-inch (262 mm) barreled upper receiver; with the CQBR installed, the weapon would then be classified as the Mk. 18 CQBR. The Mk. 18 CQBR may be issued as a standalone complete weapon system to SOCOM personnel, or as a separate upper receiver for their M4A1 to enable greater mission flexibility.

=== Mk 12 SPR ===
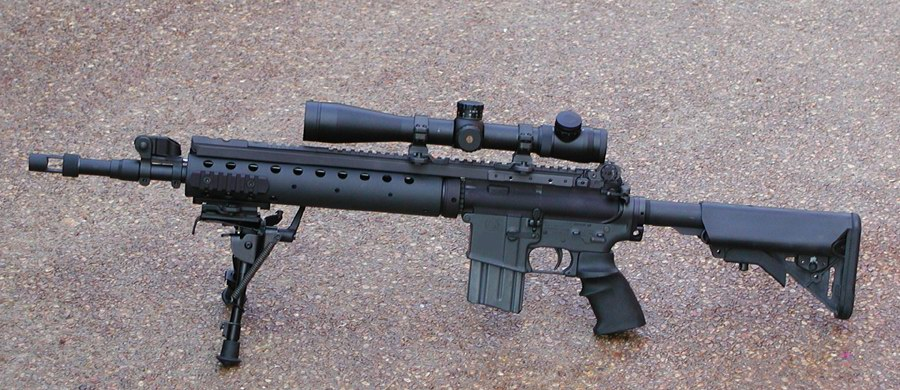
A Special Purpose Receiver built by NWSC Crane Division, mounted on an M4A1 lower receiver

The SOPMOD program also introduced the Special Purpose Receiver (SPR), a 16-or-18 in (406-or-457 mm) barreled upper receiver that would be mated to an M4A1 lower receiver to allow the weapon to serve as a designated marksman rifle (DMR). Although originally intended as an upper receiver kit for the M4A1 like the CQBR, the SPR would eventually be issued as a standalone complete rifle designated the Mk. 12 Special Purpose Rifle, with some assembled from M4A1 lower receivers.

=== SOPMOD Block II ===
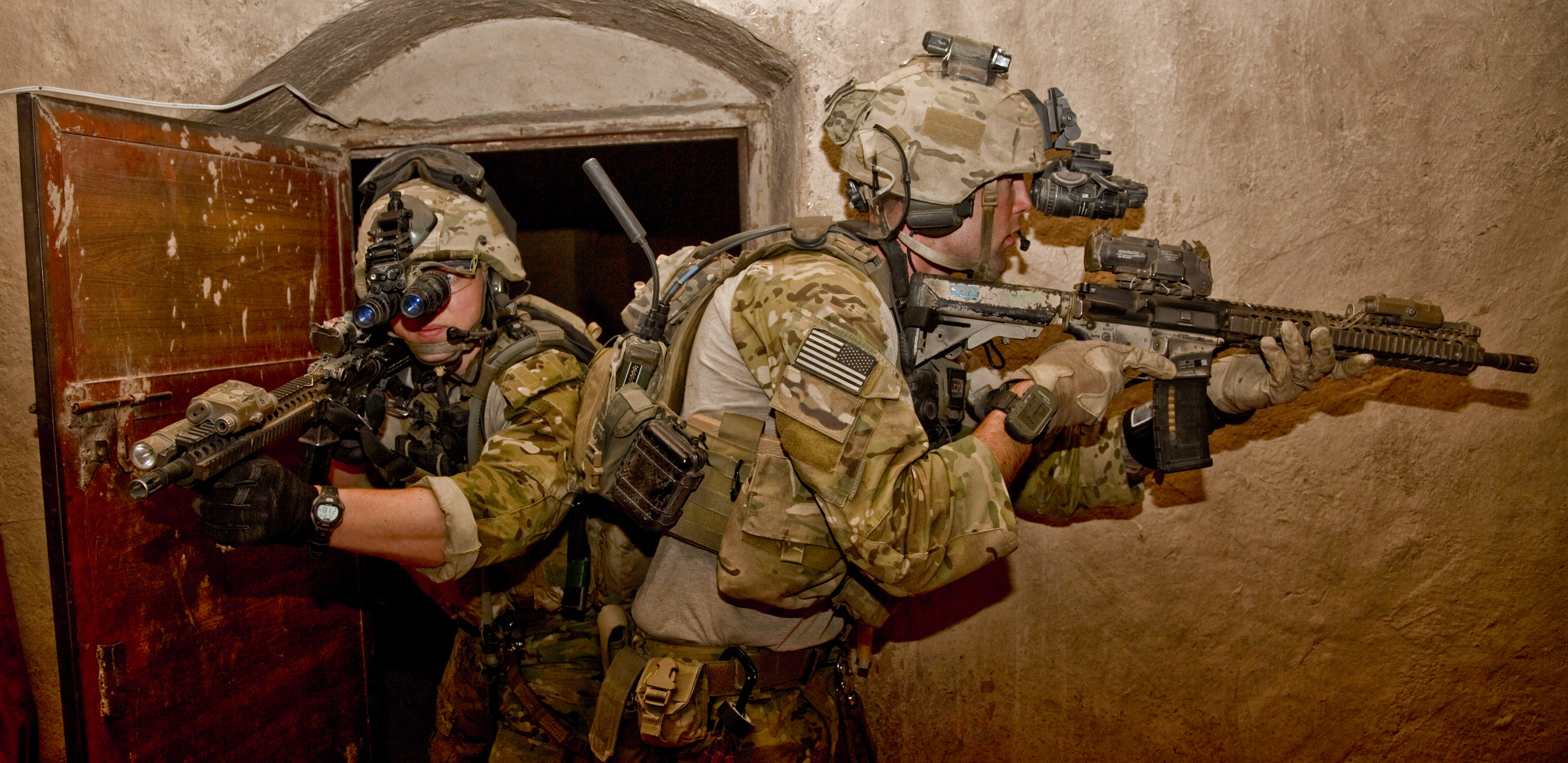
M4A1s in SOPMOD Block II used by 2 75th Ranger Regiment operators clearing a room during a night raid in Helmand Province, Afghanistan, 2012

The SOPMOD Block II is a more radical modification kit for the baseline M4A1 that can be fitted at first-echelon unit maintenance level. Components of the Block II were phased in gradually, but the most distinctive feature is the free-floated Daniel Defense Rail Interface System II (RIS II), first issued in 2008. The RIS II is available in 9.5 inches for the Mk 18 Mod 1 or 12.5 inches for the M4A1. Other components of the Block II include the L3 Advanced Target Pointer Illuminator Aiming Laser (ATPIAL), or the AN/PEQ-15 as well as the LA5 high-power variants, and the ELCAN SpecterDR 1-4 optic.

=== Upper Receiver Group-Improved (URG-I) ===
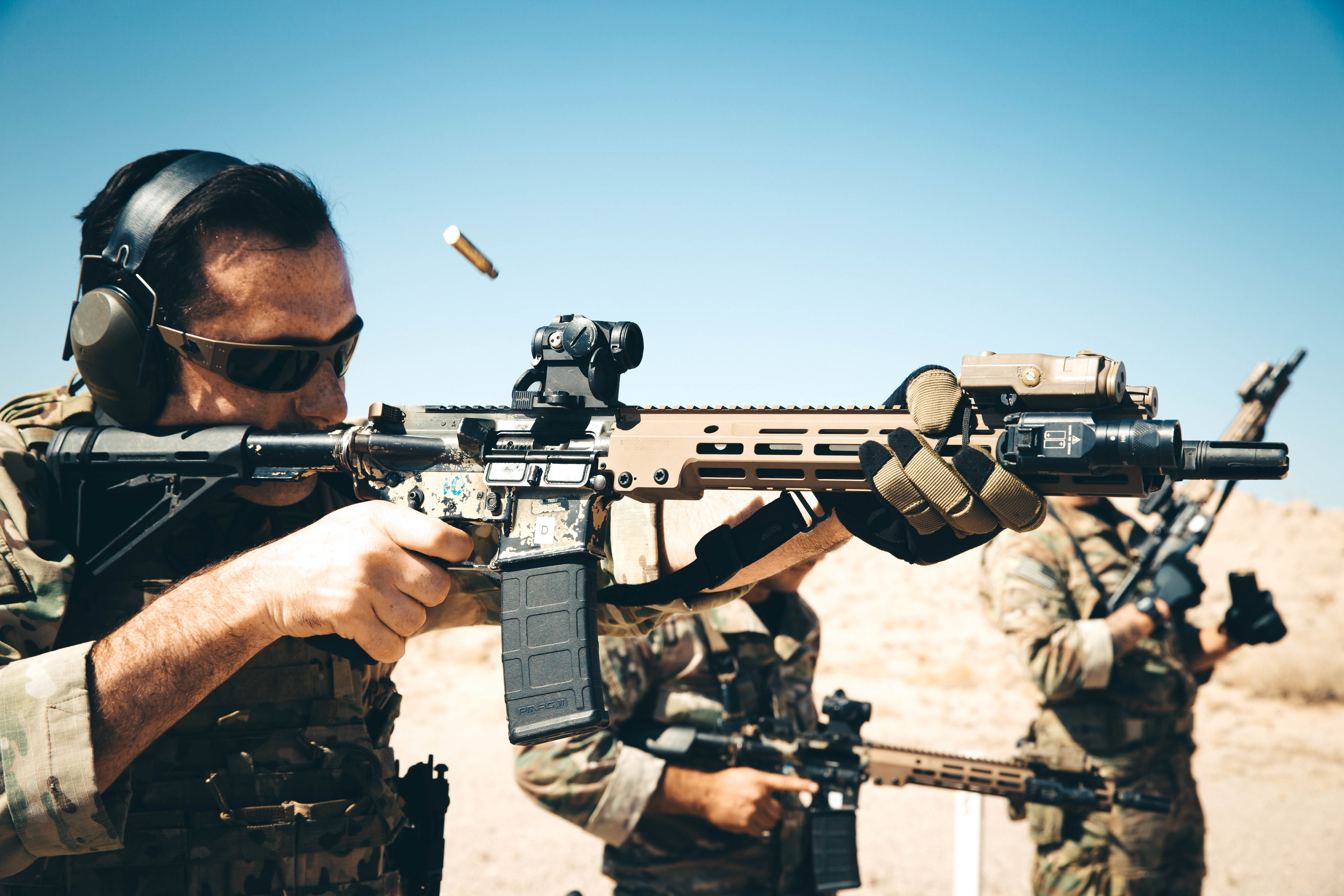
The URG-I used by one of the Green Berets from 3rd SFG (A) with a black Magpul PMAG during training at Marine Corps Air Ground Combat Center, Twentynine Palms, California in 2019

The Upper Receiver Group-Improved (URG-I) is a U.S. Army Special Operations Command (USASOC) program to further improve the durability and reliability of the SOPMOD Block II by introducing additional component improvements. First fielded in 2018, the main improvements are the lighter Geissele Mark 16 free-float rail that incorporates M-LOK as the mounting method and a Daniel Defense cold hammer-forged barrel that returns to the lighter "government" profile contour as well as a mid-length gas system. Although initially an Army program, the URG-I has seen use by other components of SOCOM as well.

=== GAU-5/A ===
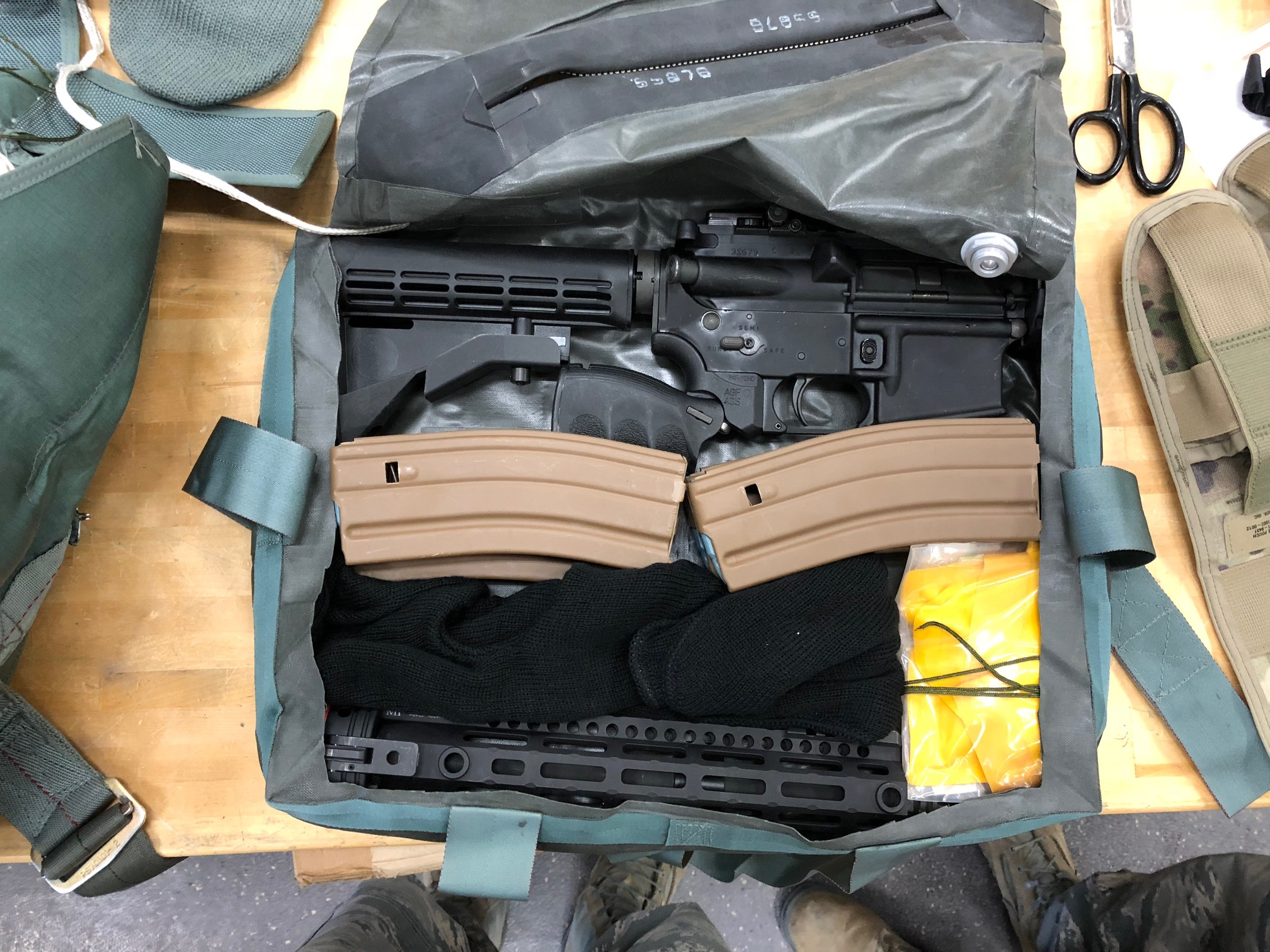
The U.S. Air Force's GAU-5A packed in the ACES II ejection seat's survival kit

The GAU-5/A Aircrew Self Defense Weapon (ASDW) is an Air Force modified M4 with a detachable barrel and handguard assembly, folding pistol grip, and fold-down iron sights to enable compact packaging. This weapon is stowed in ejection seats of tactical aircraft and is intended to allow aircrew who egress in hostile environments to better defend themselves until rescue than existing handguns. The weapons entered service in 2018. Confusingly, this weapon shares the same designation as the Air Force CAR-15 variant in service since 1966.

== Performance ==
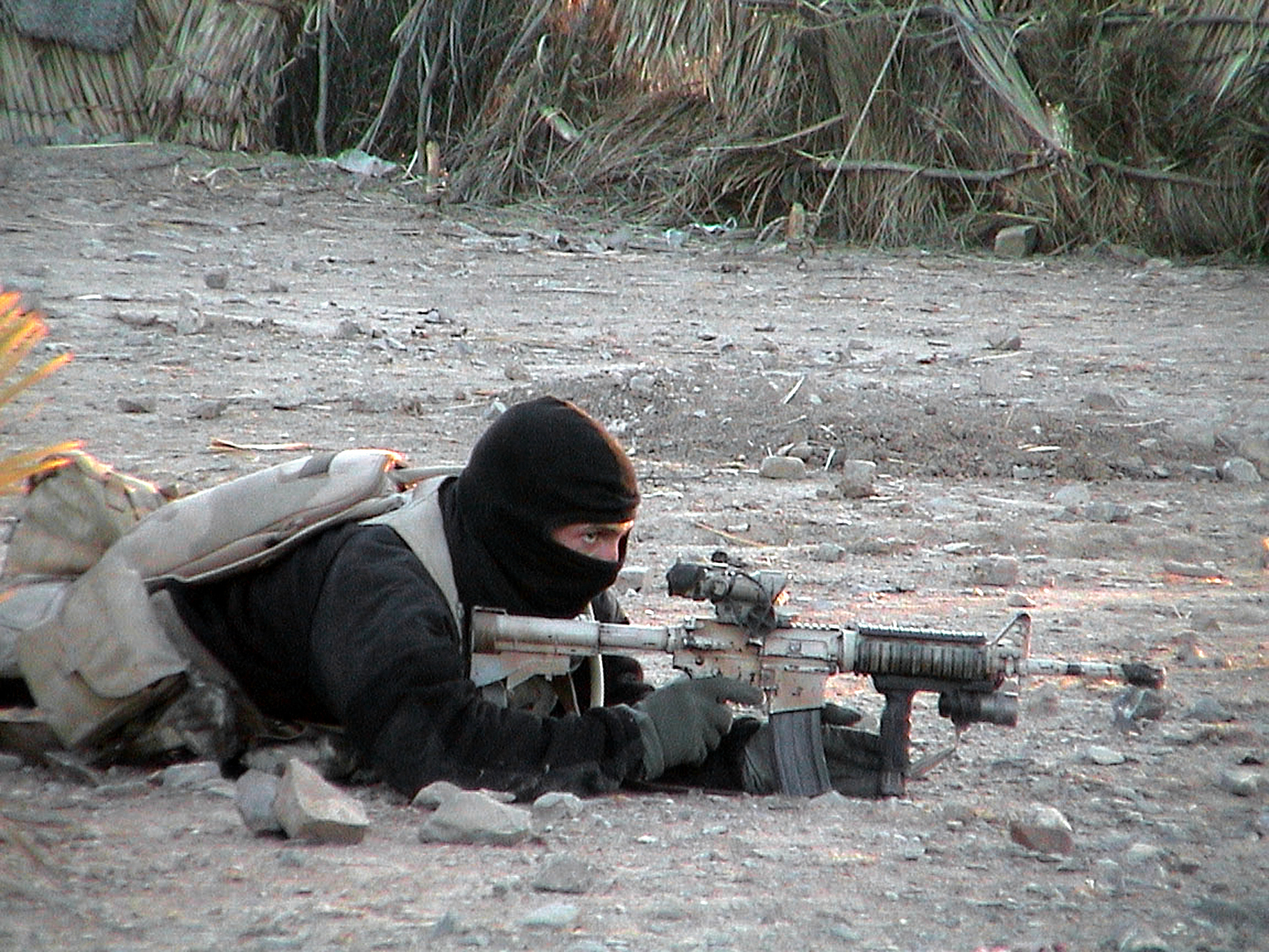
A U.S. Navy SEAL with an M4 during counterterrorism operations in Afghanistan, January 2002

The M4 carbine has been used for close-quarters operations where the M16 would be too long and bulky to use effectively. It has been a compact, light, customizable, and accurate weapon. Like other firearms, failure to properly maintain the M4 can result in malfunctions. This became apparent as it saw continued use in the sandy environments of Iraq and Afghanistan. Despite this, in post-combat surveys, 94% of soldiers rated the M4 as an effective weapons system.

=== 2006 CNA report ===
In December 2006, the Center for Naval Analyses (CNA) released a report on U.S. small arms in combat. The CNA conducted surveys on 2,608 troops returning from combat in Iraq and Afghanistan over the previous 12 months. Only troops who fired their weapons at enemy targets were allowed to participate. 917 troops were armed with M4 Carbines, making up 35% of the survey. 89% of M4 users reported they were satisfied with the weapon. 90% were satisfied with handling qualities such as handguards, size, and weight. M4 users had the highest levels of satisfaction with weapon performance, including 94% with accuracy, 92% with range, and 93% with rate of fire. Only 19% of M4 users reported a stoppage, and 82% of those that experienced a stoppage said it had little impact on their ability to clear the stoppage and re-engage their target. The lowest rated weapon was the M9, and the M249 had the highest rate of stoppages. 53% of the M4 users never experienced failures of their magazines to feed. 81% did not need their rifles repaired while in theater. 80% were confident in the M4's reliability, defined as confidence their weapon will fire without malfunction, and 83% were confident in its durability, defined as confidence their weapon will not break or need repair. Both factors were attributed to high levels of soldiers performing their own maintenance. 54% of M4 users offered recommendations for improvements. 20% of requests were for greater bullet lethality, and 10% were for better quality magazines, as well as other minor recommendations. Only 75% of M16 users were satisfied with it, and some expressed their desire to be issued the M4. Some issues from this report have been addressed with the issuing of the improved STANAG magazine in March 2009, and the M855A1 Enhanced Performance Round in June 2010.

=== 2007 dust test ===
In summer and fall 2007, the Army tested the M4 against three other carbines in "sandstorm conditions" at Aberdeen Proving Ground, Maryland: the Heckler & Koch XM8, Fabrique Nationale de Herstal SOF Combat Assault Rifle (SCAR) and the Heckler & Koch HK416. Ten of each type of rifle were used to fire 6,000 rounds each, for a total of 60,000 rounds per rifle type. The M4 suffered far more stoppages than its competitors: 882 stoppages, 19 requiring an armorer to fix. The XM8 had the fewest stoppages, 116 minor stoppages and 11 major ones, followed by the FN SCAR with 226 stoppages and the HK416 with 233.

Despite 863 minor stoppages—termed "class one" stoppages, which require 10 seconds or less to clear, or "class two" stoppages, which require more than ten seconds to clear—the M4 functioned well, with over 98% of the 60,000 total rounds firing without a problem. The Army said it planned to improve the M4 with a new cold-hammer-forged barrel to give longer life and more reliable magazines to reduce the stoppages. Magazine failures caused 239 of the M4's failures. Army officials said the new magazines could be combat-ready by spring if testing went well. The Army began issuing an improved STANAG magazine in March 2009.

According to the Army, the M4 only suffered 296 stoppages and said that the high number reported could be attributed to discrepancies in the scoring process. The Army testing command stated that, if the number of stoppages caused by a broken part met some threshold, they would be eliminated from the final report pending redesign of the part. The methodology of the test has been debated, as many of the M4s in the test had already seen use, whereas the other rifles were brand new, and that the wide variance in results between summer and fall showed that the test was not accurate, as it was not repeatable with consistent results. Furthermore, the trial M4s had burst-mode fire groups, which are more complicated and prone to failure than the fully automatic fire groups the other manufacturers presented for testing.

There were three extreme dust tests performed in 2007. The second test results showed a large difference from the last test with the M4 having 148 class 1 stoppages caused by rifle malfunctions and 148 class 1 stoppages caused by magazine stoppages. The full-size M16 rifle had 61 stoppages during the same extreme dust test.

=== Reliability ===
In early 2010, two journalists from the New York Times spent three months with soldiers and Marines in Afghanistan. While there, they questioned around 100 infantrymen about the reliability of their M4 carbines, as well as the M16 rifle. Troops did not report reliability problems with their rifles. While only 100 troops were asked, they fought at least a dozen intense engagements in Helmand Province, where the ground is covered in fine powdered sand (called "moon dust" by troops) that can stick to firearms. Weapons were often dusty, wet, and covered in mud. Intense firefights lasted hours with several magazines being expended. Only one soldier reported a jam when his M16 was covered in mud after climbing out of a canal. The weapon was cleared and resumed firing with the next chambered round. Furthermore, a Marine chief warrant officer reported that there were no issues with his battalion's 700 M4s and 350 M16s.

The reliability of the M4 has increased as the design was upgraded. In 1990, the M4 was required to fire 600 mean rounds between stoppages using M855 ammunition. In 2013, the current M4A1 version can fire 1,691 mean rounds between stoppages using M855A1 ammunition. During the 2009 Marine Corps Infantry Automatic Rifle testing, the Colt IAR displayed a MRBS of CLASS I/II Stoppages of 952 rounds, with a MRBEFF (Mean Rounds Between Essential Function Failure) of Class III Stoppages of 60,000 rounds.

=== Gas piston ===
An array of firearms accessory makers have offered gas piston conversion kits for the M4. The claimed benefits include less needed lubrication for the bolt carrier group to run reliably and reduced fouling. The argument against it is increased weight and reduced accuracy. The Enhanced M4 uses an articulating link piston operating system. Complicating the Army search for higher reliability in the M4 is a number of observations of M4 gas piston alternatives that suffer unintended design problems. The first is that many of the gas piston modifications for the M4 isolate the piston so that piston jams or related malfunction require the entire weapon be disassembled, such disassembly cannot be performed by the end-user and requires a qualified armorer to perform out of field, whereas almost any malfunction with the direct-impingement system can be fixed by the end-user in field. The second is that gas piston alternatives use an off-axis operation of the piston that can introduce carrier tilt, whereby the bolt carrier fails to enter the buffer tube at a straight angle, resulting in part wearing. This can also tilt the bolt during extraction, leading to increased bolt lug failures. The third is that the use of a sound suppressor results in hot gases entering the chamber, regardless of a direct-gas impingement or gas piston design choice. The gas piston system may also cause the firearm to become proprietary to the manufacturer, making modifications and changes with parts from other manufacturers difficult.

=== Accuracy ===
In a study conducted by the Army Marksmanship Unit, they found that at a distance of 300 yd (270 m), the M16 achieved a 24 in (610 mm) grouping, and the M4 achieved a 32 in (810 mm) grouping, which dropped to 12 in (300 mm) and 18 in (460 mm) respectively when using match grade ammunition. As the average male torso is 18–19 in (460–480 mm) wide, author Chris McNab concluded that this meant the M4 can be consistently accurate up to 300 yards, and noted that the frequent usage of optical attachments meant it could be accurate to higher ranges.

=== ArmWest, LLC modified M4 ===
In 2014, American firearms designer Jim Sullivan provided a video interview regarding his contributions to the M16 and M4 family of rifles while working for Armalite. A noted critic of the M4, he illustrates the deficiencies found in the rifle in its current configuration. In the video, he demonstrates his "ArmWest, LLC modified M4", with enhancements he believes necessary to rectify the issues with the weapon. Proprietary issues aside, the weapon is said to borrow features in his prior development, the Ultimax. Sullivan has stated (without exact details as to how) the weapon can fire from the closed bolt in semi-automatic and switch to open bolt when firing in fully automatic, improving accuracy. The weight of the cyclic components of the gun has been doubled (while retaining the weapon's weight at less than 8 pounds). Compared to the standard M4, which in automatic fires 700–950 rounds a minute, the rate of fire of the ArmWest, LLC M4 is heavily reduced both to save ammunition and reduce barrel wear. The reduced rate also renders the weapon more controllable and accurate in automatic firing.

== Manufacturers ==
- Colt's Manufacturing Company, US
- Remington Arms Company, US
- FN Herstal, Belgium and US (FNH America)
- SME Ordnance, Malaysia
- Sarsılmaz, Turkey
- United Defense Manufacturing Corporation, Philippines

== Trademark issues ==
The M4 was developed and produced for the United States government by Colt Firearms, which had an exclusive contract to produce the M4 family of weapons through 2011. However, a number of other manufacturers offer M4-like firearms. Colt previously held a U.S. trademark on the term "M4". Many manufacturers offer production firearms that are essentially identical to a military M4, but with a 16-inch (41 cm) barrel. The Bushmaster M4 Type Carbine is a popular example. Civilian models are sometimes colloquially referred to as "M4gery" (/ɛmˈfɔːrdʒəri/ em-FOR-jə-ree, a portmanteau of "M4" and "forgery.") Colt had maintained that it retained sole rights to the M4 name and design, while other manufacturers had long maintained that Colt had been overstating its rights, and that "M4" had now become a generic term for a shortened AR-15.

In April 2004, Colt filed a lawsuit against Heckler & Koch and Bushmaster Firearms, claiming acts of trademark infringement, trade dress infringement, trademark dilution, false designation of origin, false advertising, patent infringement, unfair competition, and deceptive trade practices. Heckler & Koch later settled out of court, changing one product's name from "HK M4" to "HK416". However, on December 8, 2005, a district court judge in Maine granted a summary judgment in favor of Bushmaster Firearms, dismissing all of Colt's claims except for false advertising. On the latter claim, Colt could not recover monetary damages. The court also ruled that "M4" was now a generic name and that Colt's trademark should be revoked.

== Users ==
- Afghanistan: Former Afghan National Army commando stocks in use by the Taliban.
- Albania: Used by Albanian Land Force 2015.
- Antigua and Barbuda: M4/M4A1s announced to be sold via FMS program in 2017.
- Argentina: Used by Argentine Army, Argentine Navy and Argentine National Gendarmerie
- Australia: M4A1 (designated M4A5), used by Special Operations Command, Clearance Divers, and Police Tactical Groups.
- Azerbaijan: M4 carbine used by the special military units and State Border Service (DSX).
- Bahamas: M4 carbine used by Royal Bahamas Defence Force and seen in hands of RBDF soldiers during joint-exercise with Americans.
- Bahrain: M4A1s sold as a 2008 Foreign Military Sales package. More M4/M4A1s announced to be sold via FMS program in 2017.
- Belize: M4s/M4A1s sold as part of a 2006 Foreign Military Sales package. More M4/M4A1s announced to be sold via FMS program in 2017.
- Bosnia & Herzegovina: M4A1s used by the military and air guard units.
- Bolivia: M4s used by UMOPAR and GTIDE units of the Policia Nacional. M4A1 in use with rangers.
- Brazil: Used by Civil Police, Military Police of Espirito Santo State, Military Police of Rio de Janeiro State, the Brazilian Federal Police and Special Forces of the Brazilian Army, Brazilian Navy.
- Croatia: User since 2003, several hundred purchased for Croatian ISF contingent as well as Special Forces.
- Czech Republic: Bushmaster M4A3 B.M.A.S., Daniel Defense M4A1 and MK18 is used by (601st Special forces group, Military police, 43rd Airborne mechanized battalion) of Czech Army.
- China: A variant is made by Norinco as the Norinco CQ. CQ-A carbine variant used by the Sichuan Police Department, Chongqing SWAT teams, and the Snow Leopard Commando Unit.
- Colombia: M4A1s as part of a 2008 Foreign Military Sales. More M4/M4A1s announced to be sold via FMS program in 2017.
- Costa Rica
- Dominican Republic
- East Timor
- Ecuador: M4s sold as a 2008 Foreign Military Sales package.
- Egypt
- El Salvador: M4s sold as part of a 2007 Foreign Military Sales package. Additional M4s sold as a 2008 Foreign Military Sales package.
- France: Used by the 1er RPIMa
- Georgia: Bushmaster M4s being replaced by Colt M4s for the military. More M4/M4A1s announced to be sold via FMS program in 2017. Joint Georgian-Israeli production M4 based "GI-4" launched in 2021.
- Ghana
- Greece: M16A2s and M4s are used by the "Special Forces" branch as well as by the airborne battalions of the Hellenic Army.
- Guatemala: Took deliveries of 2000 M4A1 carbines as 48 years old arms freeze finally lifted.
- Hungary: M4A1 SOPMOD by Hungarian MH 34th Bercsényi László special operation battalion More M4/M4A1s announced to be sold via FMS program in 2017.
- India: M4A1s as part of a 2008 Foreign Military Sales. M4A1 is used by the Mizoram Armed Police, PARA SF and Force One of the Mumbai Police.
- Indonesia: Used by Detachment 88 Counter-terrorism Police Squad operators. Also used by Komando Pasukan Katak (Kopaska) tactical diver group and Komando Pasukan Khusus (Kopassus) special forces group.
- Iraq: Used by the Iraqi Army. Main weapon of the Iraqi National Counter-Terrorism Force. More M4/M4A1s announced to be sold via FMS program in 2017.
  - Kurdistan Region: Used by Peshmerga.
- Israel: Sold as part of a January 2001 Foreign Military Sales package to Israel. Standard issue in the Israel Defense Forces, but it has been gradually replaced with the IWI Tavor since 2001.
- Italy: Used by the Special Forces
- Jamaica: M4s sold as part of a 2007 Foreign Military Sales package.
- Japan: M4A1s as part of a 2008 Foreign Military Sales package. M4A1 SOPMOD rifles are in use by the Japanese Special Forces Group, but is supposedly denied by the JGSDF after Ishiba was arrested for violating American export laws.
- Jordan: M4s sold as part of a 2007 Foreign Military Sales package. Additional M4s sold as a 2008 Foreign Military Sales package. More M4/M4A1s announced to be sold via FMS program in 2017.
- Kenya: Used by Kenyan troops Kenya Defence Forces in AMISOM ops.
- Kosovo
- Kuwait
- Lebanon: M4 components being sold to Lebanese special forces. M4/M4A1s sold as a 2008 Foreign Military Sales package. More M4/M4A1s announced to be sold via FMS program in 2017.
- Malaysia: Made under license by SME Ordnance Sdn Bhd. Used by military and police special forces.
- Morocco
- Nepal: 1,070 M4s, sold as part of a 2005 Foreign Military Sales package.
- New Zealand: Used by NZSAS operators and standard issue to New Zealand Police including Special Tactics Group and Armed Offenders Squad units.
- North Macedonia: Used by the Army of North Macedonia
- Oman: M4/M4A1s announced to be sold via FMS program in 2017.
- Pakistan: M4A1 variant used by the Special Forces of the Pakistani military besides the POF G3P4 standard rifle for the Pakistani military— also used by the Special Security Unit (SSU) of the Sindh Police. More M4/M4A1s announced to be sold via FMS program in 2017.
- Palau: Used by the Palau Police.
- Palestine
  - Palestinian Authority: Used by Palestinian security forces.
  - Hamas: Used by Hamas militants both in the Gaza Strip and in areas that are under control of the Palestinian Authority.
- Panama: M4A1s sold as a 2008 Foreign Military Sales package. More M4/M4A1s announced to be sold via FMS program in 2017.
- Peru: Airforce Special Group and anti-narcotics units
- Philippines: Colt M4/M4A1s sold as a 2008 Foreign Military Sales package. 63,000 R4A3 rifles from Remington Arms for the Philippine Army and the Philippine Marine Corps. Several units also used by the Defense Intelligence and Security Group.
- Poland: Used by Wojska Specjalne military unit JW Grom.
- Romania: M4/M4A1s announced to be sold via FMS program in 2017.
- Russia: Used in limited quantities by FSB Alpha and spotted in hands of RuAF in a training exercise.
- Senegal: M4/M4A1s announced to be sold via FMS program in 2017. 2,200 M4s sold through FMS program in 2019.
- Serbia: Used by Gendarmery and Special Anti-Terrorist Unit.
- Singapore: Used by the Commandos and the Police Coast Guard (only the Port Squadron and the Coastal Patrol Squadron) of the Singapore Police Force.
- Slovakia: M4/M4A1s announced to be procured via FMS program in 2017.
- Sweden: 15,000 M4A1s purchased directly from US Army stocks in 2024 to act as interim service weapons while awaiting full delivery of the new Automatkarbin 24
- Taiwan: Used by Republic of China Army, Republic of China Marine Corps and National Police Agency The First Security Battalion, Air Defense and Base Guard Group are equipped with M4A1 carbines.
- Thailand: M4A1s sold as part of a 2006 Foreign Military Sales package.
- Tonga: M4/M4A1s sold as a 2008 Foreign Military Sales package.
- Tunisia: Used by the Tunisian Army's Special Forces Group (GFS), 51st Infantry Navy Commandos Regiment, Presidential Guard and various National Guard and Police special forces units. Used by the Unité Spéciale – Garde Nationale.
- Turkey: Produced under license by Sarsılmaz Firearms. M4A1 carbines used by Underwater Offence.
- Uganda: Used by Ugandan troops in AMISOM ops.
- Ukraine: Used by special forces and many other ground units.
- United Arab Emirates: Purchased 2,500 M4 carbines in 1993.
- United States
- Uruguay: Colt M4 and Bushmaster M4 carbines for Special Operation Group (Metropolitan Police)
- Yemen: M4s sold as part of a 2006 Foreign Military Sales package.

=== Former users ===
- Islamic Republic of Afghanistan: Used by Afghan National Army commandos during the Taliban insurgency. M4s sold as part of a 2006 Foreign Military Sales package. Additional M4s sold as a 2008 Foreign Military Sales package. Captured stocks currently in use with the Islamic Emirate of Afghanistan.

== Conflicts ==
=== 1990s ===
- Kosovo War (1998–1999), first US military usage of the M4 carbine

=== 2000s ===
- War in Afghanistan (2001–2021)
- Internal conflict in Peru
- Iraq War (2003–2011)
- South Thailand insurgency (2004–present)
- 2006 Lebanon War (2006)
- Mexican drug war (2006–present)
- Russo-Georgian War (2008)
- Gaza War (2008–2009)
- Insurgency in Paraguay

=== 2010s ===
- Syrian civil war (2011–2024)
- Lahad Datu standoff (2013)
- War in Iraq (2013–2017)
- Battle of Arsal (2014)
- Yemeni civil war (2014–present)
- Battle of Marawi (2017)

=== 2020s ===
- 2021 Beirut clashes (2021)
- Russian invasion of Ukraine (2022–present)
- Gaza war (2023–present)
- 2024 Enga Clashes (2024)

== See also ==
- AK-105 – Russian short barrel assault rifle
- Barrett M468 – Assault rifle manufactured by Barrett Firearms Manufacturing
- Brown Enhanced Automatic Rifle – Assault rifle manufactured by Adcor Defense
- Comparison of the AK-47 and M16 – Comparison of the two most common assault rifles
- LVOA – Semi-automatic rifle designed by War Sport Industries
- LWRC M6 – Series of US military carbines based on the M4 carbine
- M231 Firing Port Weapon – American assault rifle
- SIG Sauer SIG516 – Family of rifles manufactured by SIG Sauer
- SIG Sauer SIGM400 – Family of firearms manufactured by SIG Sauer
