= Carrier tilt =

Carrier tilt is a wear issue that can arise in some gas piston-based firearm operating systems. High pressure gas pushes the gas piston back hitting the bolt carrier. This force pushes the bolt carrier down into the buffer tube wall. This can lead to increased wear, shaved and/or chipped metal. This in turn can lead to a loss of accuracy.

== Solutions ==
Colt says that by allowing the operating rod to wiggle the downward force is alleviated and shifted rearward instead. Conversely, Adams Arms cites loose or sloppy tolerances inside the receiver as root source of the problem and thus utilizes a single-piece carrier to solve the problem. Other companies solve this issue modifying the carrier length. Black Rifle Arms utilizing a shorted carrier to accommodate a polymer based buffer and Patriot Ordnance Factory using a lengthened carrier, sporting an extended lower lip. Blecher LLC says that they have eliminated carrier tilt by designing Upper Receivers with dual carrier paths for both the piston and the bolt carrier group, and by rigid attachment of the piston to the rear of the bolt carrier group. This is said to push the carrier back in a uniform fashion and restrict any off-axis movement.
