= Winchester Model 70 =

Bolt action rifle made by Winchester

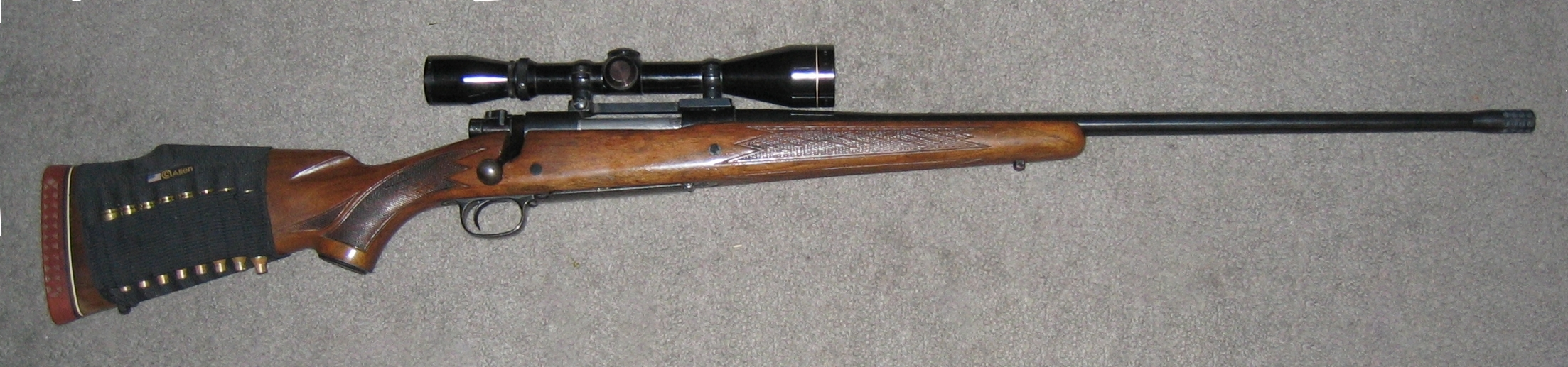
- Winchester Model 70 with rifle scope, 24-inch (61 cm) barrel, and one-piece scope mount
- Type: Bolt-action rifle
- Place of origin: United States

Service history
- Used by: United States Marine Corps
- Wars: World War II; Korean War; Vietnam War

Production history
- Manufacturer: Winchester Repeating Arms Company, U.S. Repeating Arms, Fabrique Nationale de Herstal
- Produced: 1936–1963 (pre-1964, controlled feed) (Original); 1964–2006 (post-1964 push feed) (Classic); 2006–present (controlled feed)
- Variants: see article

Specifications
- Mass: 6–8 lb (2.7–3.6 kg)
- Barrel length: 20–28 in (51–71 cm)
- Cartridge: Multiple: 6.5mm Creedmoor; 6.5x55mm; 7mm-08 Remington; 7mm Remington Magnum; 7mm Winchester Short Magnum; 6.8 Western; .204 Ruger; .22-250 Remington; .223 Remington; .223 Winchester Super Short Magnum; .243 Winchester; .243 Winchester Super Short Magnum; .25-06 Remington; .25 Winchester Super Short Magnum; .264 Winchester Magnum; .270 Winchester; .270 Winchester Short Magnum; .280 Remington; .30-06 Springfield; .300 Winchester Magnum; .300 Winchester Short Magnum; .308 Winchester; .325 Winchester Short Magnum; .338 Winchester Magnum; .375 H&H Magnum; .416 Remington Magnum; .458 Winchester Magnum
- Action: Bolt action
- Feed system: Internal spring-fed magwell with floorplate; capacity varies by caliber: 3-round capacity (magnum calibers); 4-round capacity (large calibers); 5-round capacity (standard calibers)
- Sights: Iron Sights Variant: Iron front, open adjustable iron rear, and tapped for scope mounts; Scoped Sights Variant: Tapped for scope mounts (no iron sights) (Note: There are two variants of scope mounts, long action (magnum rounds) or short action. If using a one-piece scope mount, this matters. If using a two-piece scope mount, this matters less.)

The Winchester Model 70 is a bolt-action rifle. It has an iconic place in American sporting culture and has been held in high regard by shooters since it was introduced in 1936, earning the moniker the "Rifleman's Rifle". The action has some design similarities to Mauser designs, and it is a development of the earlier Winchester Model 54, itself being based on a Mauser 98–type action.

The Model 70 was originally manufactured by the Winchester Repeating Arms Company between 1936 and 1980. From the early 1980s until 2006, Winchester rifles were manufactured by U.S. Repeating Arms (USRA) under an agreement with Olin Corporation, allowing USRA to use the Winchester name and logo. Model 70s were built in New Haven, Connecticut, from 1936 to 2006, when production ceased. In the fall of 2007, the Belgian company FN Herstal announced that Model 70 production would resume. As of 2012, new Winchester Model 70 rifles were being made by FN Herstal in Columbia, South Carolina. In 2013, assembly was moved to Portugal.

== The Model 70 ==
In 1936, Winchester introduced the Model 70 bolt-action rifle to the American market. The Model 70 was largely based on the Model 54 and is today still highly regarded by shooters and is often called the "Rifleman's Rifle". In 1999, Shooting Times magazine named the Model 70 the "Bolt-action Rifle of the Century".

Throughout its life, the Model 70 has been offered in many grades and styles.

== 1936 through 1963 Model 70 ==
The pre-1964 Model 70s were manufactured from 1936 through 1963, and gained popularity along with the .270 Winchester with the help of gun writer Jack O'Connor, after which time significant changes in the design and manufacture of the rifles were made. Pre-1964 Model 70s bring a substantial price premium due to a public perception that they were better, as they had several desirable features (Mauser-type controlled round feed, cut checkering) that the post-1964 version did not. The best way to identify a pre-1964 model is the serial number and the fore-end screw to secure the barrel to the stock. Model 70 rifles with serial numbers below 700,000 are the pre-1964 variety. The receivers of these Model 70s were machined from bar-stock steel.

=== Pre-1964 Model 70 action (controlled round feed) ===
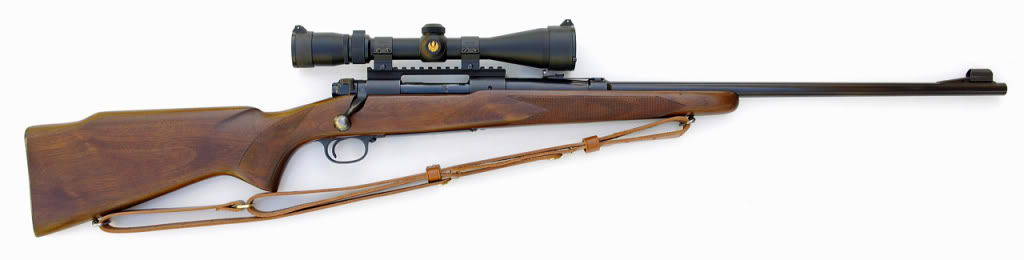
Winchester Model 70 Pre-1964

The original Model 70 quickly established an excellent reputation with American sportsmen. It was a high-quality action of considerable strength, with two forward locking lugs and a Mauser-type nonrotating claw extractor. The key benefit of the Mauser-type extractor compared to later versions is that it more positively extracts the spent casing. This feature is often referred to as "controlled round feeding" (CRF) because the extractor captures the rim of a cartridge as it is fed upwards from the magazine and controls its journey forward into the rifle's chamber. Later designs, referred to as push feed, only capture the cartridge by the magazine lips and the chamber, and the cartridge is not held to the bolt face until a spring-loaded extractor is pushed over the cartridge's extractor groove. The smaller extractor of the push-feed action may slip or break off a spent casing stuck in the chamber under adverse conditions. Therefore, the more positive extraction of the CRF action is favored by some shooters, especially those who pursue dangerous game, so require rifles to extract reliably. This function is necessary to allow subsequent cartridges to be fed and fired in a bolt-action rifle with only a single barrel. The ejector on the original Model 70 was of the blade type similar to that of the Mauser M 98, but considered superior, as it did not require a Mauser-type slot through the left locking lug; instead, a slot was in the bolt face below the locking lug, leaving both forward lugs solid and hence stronger. The main benefit of the blade-type ejector is it is simpler and perhaps more reliable (being considered less susceptible to ingress of foreign matter) when compared to the later, post-1964 plunger ejector in the bolt face controlled by a coil spring.

Other significant features of this action include a three-position wing-type safety (retained throughout Model 70 production), a cone breeching system that helps prevent bullet-nose damage while loading a cartridge from the magazine, machined steel trigger guard and floor plate, one-piece bolt construction, a relatively short lock time, and a trigger adjustable for pull weight and over-travel.

The pre-1964 Model 70 rifle was officially declared as a state firearm of Alaska in 2014.

== 1964 through 1992 Model 70 ==
Competing as it did with the Remington Model 700, Winchester decided that changes needed to be made in the face of rising labor costs. Accordingly, in 1964, Winchester made a number of design changes to the Model 70. Few to none of these changes were popular with the rifle-buying public or the US military. The changes included dropping the CRF feature, a change to the basic stock shape, and the use of impressed rather than cut checkering.

Jack O'Connor, long a proponent of the Model 70, wrote of the post-1964 version, "I was informed by Winchester brass that the Model 70 was being redesigned. I told them that I was glad to get the information so I could lay in four or five more before they loused the rifle up. Then I saw the pilot model of 'New Model 70'. At the first glimpse I like to fell into a swoon. The action was simplified, the trigger guard and floor plate made of a flimsy looking one-piece stamping." Despite this initial reaction, O'Connor grudgingly went on to say, "Actually, the post-1964 Model 70 is not a bad rifle in spite of the fact that rifle aficionados have never taken it to their bosoms the way they did its predecessor. It is a stronger action than the pre-1964. The head of the bolt encloses the head of the case. It has a small, neat hook extractor, which is adequate. With this extractor, the cartridge is not as surely controlled as it is with the Mauser-type extractor. However, the new model seldom gives feeding problems.

=== Post-1964 Model 70 action (push feed) ===
To reduce manufacturing costs in the face of higher labor rates, rifles manufactured from 1964 to 1992 differed from early Model 70s in these ways:

- The receiver, for the first time, and from then on out, was forged into shape, then machined. Heat treatment of the receiver was localized to the areas where necessary, namely the cams and locking lugs, to prevent warping caused by overall heat treatment. Forging the receiver increased its strength and reduced the machining labor and time needed to achieve the final shape.
- The bolt was changed significantly. The bolt face was enclosed so that it fully surrounded the cartridge rim, in a similar way to the Remington 700 bolt. While cheaper to manufacture than the undercut bolt face needed for controlled feed actions, it is also stronger, providing more support to the cartridge case head, and better contains escaping gases in the event of a case rupture. The new bolt also differed from the old in that it was manufactured in two pieces (bolt-handle/collar and the bolt body) and then brazed together.
- The Mauser-inspired, nonrotating claw extractor (incompatible with a fully enclosed bolt head) was eliminated, and replaced with a small, wedge-shaped extractor located within a lug of the bolt head. This type of extractor does not engage the cartridge rim as it rises from the magazine into the action, but rather clips over the cartridge rim after the cartridge has been pushed into the chamber and the bolt handle is turned down. This system is more vulnerable than the old system to jamming or being inadvertently closed on an empty breech (i.e., failing to load a new round) if operated under duress, especially if the rifle is held upside-down or on its side. In addition, the old extractor design served to stabilize the bolt while the action was open; without it, the new bolt did not have any such stabilization, and wobbled while fully open. This has since been fixed in later rifles, but it was nevertheless an obvious departure and certainly less elegant in function than the earlier models, which allowed the rifle to chamber cartridges smoothly from any position.
- Barrels were now rifled by hammer forging, rather than the more costly process of being cut by hand.
- The machined steel trigger guard and floor plate were replaced with parts stamped from an aluminum alloy to reduce weight using the assembly from the pre-1964 Featherweight version.
- Some earlier models featured walnut stocks with checkering that was impressed onto the wood rather than cut into it as on the early Model 70s, further reducing manufacturing costs at the expense of a less positive grip on the rifle, particularly if the shooter is wearing gloves.

Any Model 70 rifle made since that. not designated as a "Classic" model, is likely to have this post-1964 action. In design terms (enclosed bolt face, plunger ejector, brazed bolt construction) the new action itself was comparable in design to the competing Remington Model 700, which has a worldwide following and is considered to be very reliable. When coupled with the other cost-cutting changes and compared with the previously produced and very familiar Model 70, however, it was immediately declared to be lacking. The new design of the rifle was swiftly and severely criticized by both gun writers and riflemen alike for its perceived lesser amount of control and feed issues, making the original action much more prized.

The post-1964 action has been further improved over the years. Thanks to a refined bolt head design, the bolt is now less wobbly when open, and the action is now generally considered on par with the CRF action. Under normal conditions, the action's new design is no less reliable, and although the simplified construction is certainly less elegant, some of the changes could be considered improvements, having made the action stronger. Also, the pressed checkering, one of the most reviled changes, was likewise done away with as soon as machine-cut checkering became available. All things considered, in normal situations, not much to choose between the two versions remains at present, apart from personal preference.

== 1968 Model 70 ==
In 1968, further revisions were made to the Model 70 in part to address consumer concerns. An "antibind" feature was introduced to make operation of the action smoother, which comprised a groove in an extended right locking lug operating on a rib on the right side of the receiver. This made the action noticeably smoother to operate and has been retained to the present day. A steel floorplate and stainless magazine follower were introduced, partially revoking changes introduced in the 1964 model. The alloy trigger guard was retained.

== 1992 to 2006 Model 70 ==
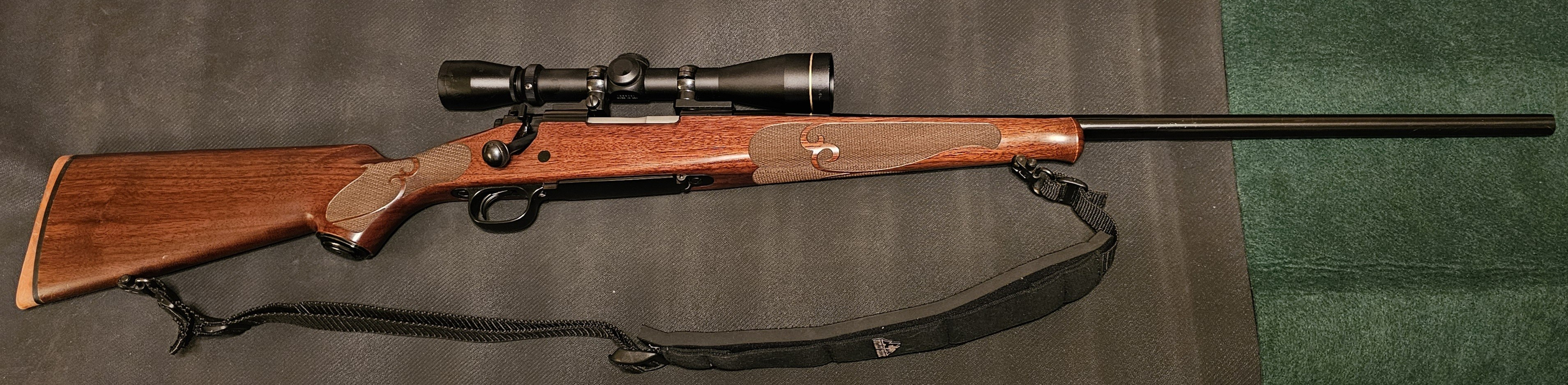
Winchester Model 70 Classic Featherweight 2003 model chambered in .300 WSM

Starting in 1992, Winchester reintroduced many features of the pre-1964 rifles, while also continuing to manufacture less-expensive variants. The post-1992 Model 70 is an extensive rifle line that boasts nearly all of the features of the original line, but with some updated equipment, such as the controlled round push feed action and synthetic stocks. The popular Shadow variants feature black resin stocks, which reduce the price of the firearm significantly, and hold up better than wooden stocks over time. Some of the modern rifles also use high performance McMillan, H. S. Precision or Bell and Carlson fiberglass stocks, though these rifles tend to be expensive. Particular models feature a one-piece aluminum pillar block bedding for greater accuracy, and some models have fluting of the barrel to reduce weight and vent the barrel for additional cooling. Carbon fiber barrels are also found on select models to reduce weight and dissipate heat faster. Walnut stocks are still found across the line in satin finishes, and laminated walnut stocks are added to the mix for structural stability in extreme dry or wet conditions. The Model 70 is offered in all of the previous chamberings as the original and is now supplemented with newer rounds, including the Winchester Short Magnum and Winchester Super Short Magnum cartridges, which are magnum-loaded rounds, but are shorter in length and wider in diameter, so spent cartridges take less time to eject and use less powder. However, these short magnum cartridges reduce magazine capacity and feeding reliability, due to their extra width and rebated rim.

=== Model 70 Classic ===
In 1992, Winchester began producing a CRF Model 70 that was marketed as the "Classic" model. This version reintroduced the CRF feature, while retaining the "antibind" locking lug groove bolt guide of the 1968 push feed model. The use of modern CNC manufacturing techniques allowed Winchester to reintroduce the CRF feature at a competitive price.

Around this time, Browning, which is owned by the same parent company as USRAC, Giat Corp, of France, introduced the BOSS accuracy system. The term BOSS is an acronym for ballistic-optimizing shooting system. The device attaches to the muzzle end of the barrel and allows the natural harmonics, commonly known as barrel whip, caused during the bullet's passage down the bore, to be reduced and controlled. By adjusting the device for optimum performance with a specific ammunition load in the individual rifle, accuracy is brought to peak level. Winchester Model 70s equipped with the BOSS provide a significant improvement in accuracy for a production rifle. Currently, only Browning rifles are available with the BOSS.

Later, Winchester expanded the Classic line, putting the Classic action on all their modern stocks, giving a wide range of choice in rifle types. This basically lets the buyer choose an action, then choose a stock to one's liking. Both pre- and post-1964 versions of the Model 70 actions have their strengths and weaknesses.

==== 1992 Classic Model (Controlled Round Feed and Controlled Round Push Feed) ====
At the same time as the CRF feature was reintroduced, a recent innovation allowed the short extractor used on the post-1964 models to ride over the extraction groove on a cartridge, giving controlled feeding without the expense of the long Mauser-type extractor. This was called controlled round push feed. This is achieved by the use of the pre-1964 ejector, combined with a modified post-1964 extractor and bolt face relieved at the bottom allowing the round to engage the bolt face from underneath.

== 2006–present Model 70 ==
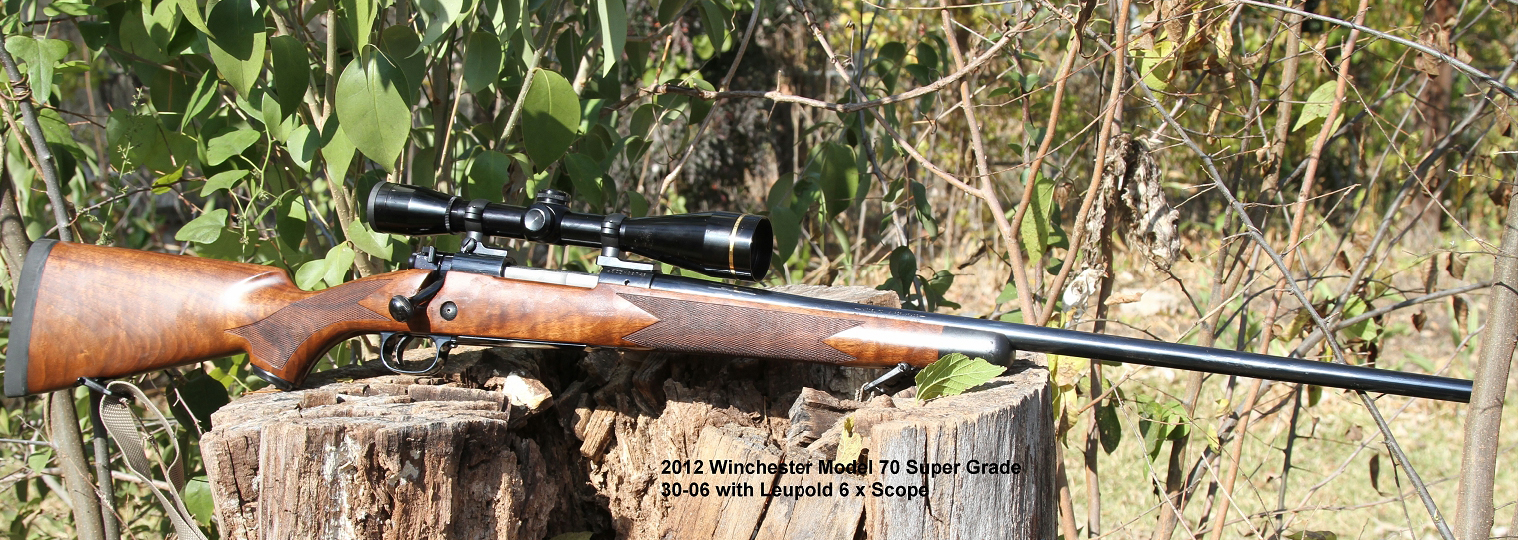
Winchester Model 70 Super Grade 2012 model chambered for .30-06 Springfield

On March 31, 2006, U.S. Repeating Arms closed the New Haven, Connecticut, plant where Winchester rifles and shotguns were produced for 140 years. This resulted in hiatus of the production of the Winchester Model 70 rifle and Winchester Model 1300 pump-action shotgun and the end of the Model 94 lever-action rifle. Other Winchester models however, are still produced in other regions such as Asia and Europe.

On August 15, 2006, Olin Corporation, owner of the Winchester trademarks, announced that it had entered into a new license agreement with Browning to make Winchester-brand rifles and shotguns, though not at the closed Winchester plant in New Haven. Browning, based in Morgan, Utah, and the former licensee, U.S. Repeating Arms Company, are both subsidiaries of FN Herstal.

In October 2007, FN Herstal announced that it would produce CRF Winchester Model 70 rifles at its facility in Columbia, South Carolina, where it currently manufactures the M240, M249, and M16 for the United States military, as well as its Special Police Rifle and Patrol Bolt Rifle lines, which are, in fact, variants of the modern Model 70 CRF rifles.

In 2013, FN/Browning relocated Model 70 assembly to Portugal.

As of 2015, Model 70 rifles are stamped, "Imported by BACO, Inc., Morgan, Utah – Made in Portugal by Browning Viana".

== FN Herstal derivatives ==
The modern Winchester Model 70 CRF action was used under the Fabrique Nationale banner as the basis for the FN Tactical Sport Rifle model line.

=== Law-enforcement derivatives ===
Winchester Model 70 series-based rifles are marketed as sniper and duty rifles for military forces and law-enforcement agencies under the Fabrique Nationale banner as the FN Special Police Rifle and the FN Patrol Bolt Rifle.

The FN Special Police Rifle is intended for use by police snipers, has the modern Winchester Model 70 CRF action, receiver, and magazine system, but the rifle is fitted with a heavier free-floating barrel and with the McMillan series tactical rifle stocks. It was approved in 2004 by the Federal Bureau of Investigation for use of by their Hostage Rescue Team. The FBI variant has the model name FNH SPR-USG (USG – US Government).

The FN Patrol Bolt Rifle is intended for tactical use by police officers and is based on the modern Winchester Model 70 CRF action, receiver, and magazine. The rifle is fitted with an aluminum pillar bedding system embedded in its Hogue Overmolded stock. The patrol rifles often have a relatively short barrel to enable faster target engagement and maneuverability in close-quarters scenarios, while still giving the ability to engage midrange targets, and allow for easy storage and removal from a police car.

== Military use ==
The United States Marine Corps (USMC) purchased 373 Model 70 rifles in May 1942. Although the USMC officially used only the M1 Garand and M1903 Springfield as sniper rifles during World War II, "many Winchester Model 70s showed up at training camps and in actual field use during the Pacific campaign." These rifles had shorter, 24-inch barrels chambered for .30-06 Springfield. They were serial numbered in the 41,000 to 50,000 range and were fitted with leaf sights and checkered stocks with steel butt plates, one-inch sling swivels, and leather slings. Some of these rifles were reported to be equipped with 8-power (8x) Unertl telescopic sights for limited unofficial use as sniper weapons on Guadalcanal and during the Korean War. Many of the surviving rifles, after reconditioning with heavier Douglas barrels and new stocks between 1956 and 1963 at the USMC match rebuild shop in Albany, Georgia, were fitted with 8x Unertl sights from M1903 sniper rifles. The reconditioned rifles were used in competitive shooting matches, and the United States Army purchased around 200 new Model 70 National Match Rifles with medium-heavy barrels for match use between 1954 and 1957. Many of the reconditioned Marine Corps match rifles were used by USMC snipers during the early years of the Vietnam War with M72 match ammunition loaded with 173-grain, boat-tailed bullets. A smaller number of the Army's Model 70 rifles also saw combat use by Army snipers, and some were equipped with suppressors for covert operations in Southeast Asia. These Model 70 rifles never achieved the status of a standard military weapon, but were used until replaced by the Remington Model 700 series bolt-action rifles, which became the basis for the M40 series sniper rifle.

One of the reasons the USMC replaced their Winchester Model 70s was that the post-1964 variants of the Model 70 did not meet USMC standards. Despite the introduction of the Remington Model 700 rifle, the pre-1964 Winchester Model 70 was still used by the USMC's scout/sniper teams during the Vietnam War alongside Remington Model 700s. The original wood stocks were found to be warping in both rifles after a few years of service, and both rifles were given fiberglass stocks to remedy the problem. Existing Model 70s still in service have had their stocks replaced with a McMillan fiberglass stock, such as that found on the Custom Extreme Weather variant.

One of the best known USMC snipers who used the Winchester Model 70 during the Vietnam War was Gunnery Sergeant Carlos Hathcock, who used one chambered in .30-06. This rifle, equipped with a standard 8×43 Unertl scope, was used by Hathcock to kill a North Vietnamese enemy sniper by shooting him in the eye, through the scope of his Mosin–Nagant rifle. While Hathcock's Model 70 has been lost to time, a few of his other rifles are on display at the Quantico, Virginia, Marine Corps Sniper Museum, including a Stevens .22-caliber, bolt-action rifle he used to hunt varmints.

== Users ==
- Indonesia
- United States

== See also ==
- Table of handgun and rifle cartridges – Small arms cartridge data
- Winchester rifle – Series of lever action repeating rifles
