= FN Tactical Sport Rifle =

- Type: Sniper rifle
- Place of origin: Belgium; United States

Production history
- Designed: 2009
- Manufacturer: FN Herstal
- Produced: 2009–present
- Variants: FN TSR XP; FN TSR XP USA

Specifications
- Mass: 8.8 lb (4.0 kg) (20" barrel); 9.6 lb (4.4 kg) (24", .308 Win); 10.1 lb (4.6 kg) (24", .300 WSM)
- Length: 40.5 in (103 cm) (20" barrel); 44.5 in (113 cm) (24" barrel)
- Barrel length: 20 in (51 cm); 24 in (61 cm)
- Cartridge: 7.62×51mm (.308 Winchester); .300 Winchester Short Magnum; .223 Remington (XP USA only)
- Action: Bolt-action
- Feed system: 6 rounds (.223 Rem); 4 rounds (7.62×51mm/.308 Winchester); 3 rounds (.300 WSM)
- Sights: Telescopic sight

The FN Tactical Sport Rifle (TSR) is a bolt-action sniper rifle produced by FN Herstal. It is based on the FN SPR. The XP present in the model names signifies the rifles having extreme precision.

== Design details ==
The Winchester Model 70 action was used as the basis for the TSR model line. The TSR uses the same forge receiver containing a flat bottomed profile and integral recoil lug that is used on the SPR. The rifle also features a hammer forged, free-floating barrel.

== Variants ==
The TSR XP USA (ultra short action) features a shorter action length. Unlike the standard XP, it is only offered in .223 Remington with a 20 in (51 cm) barrel.
