= FN Patrol Bolt Rifle =

- Type: Sniper rifle
- Place of origin: United States

Production history
- Manufacturer: FN Herstal
- Unit cost: $1,275.59 approx

Specifications
- Mass: 9 lb (4.08 kg)
- Length: 38 in (97 cm) (18" barrel)
- Barrel length: 18 in (46 cm); 20 in (51 cm); 22 in (56 cm); 24 in (61 cm)
- Cartridge: 7.62×51mm NATO/.308 Winchester
- Barrels: 1:12" right-hand twist
- Action: Bolt action, controlled feed
- Feed system: 4-round removable magazine
- Sights: Stock with M1913 rail for optical scope mount

The FNH Patrol Bolt Rifle is a bolt-action tactical rifle produced by Fabrique Nationale de Herstal. All models are chambered with the standard 7.62×51mm NATO (.308 Winchester) cartridge.

== Manufacturer ==
The FN Herstal PBR (Patrol Bolt Rifle) is manufactured and distributed by FN Herstal USA, the United States division of the armament company. The design is based on the Winchester Model 70 and is available in 18", 20", 22" or 24" barrel lengths. Additionally, a 16" and 18" barrel is available with a recoil reducer. It features a Picatinny rail for mounting aiming optics. A specially designed FN/Hogue stock with a full-length aluminum bedding block, featuring a cold rotary forged free floating medium heavy barrel with recessed crown and a four groove, right hand, 1 in 12 twist rate. It utilizes a removable magazine with four round capacity.
