= Undercarriage =

Undercarriage is the part of a moving vehicle that is underneath the main body of the vehicle. The term originally applied to this part of a horse-drawn carriage, and usage has since broadened to include:

- The landing gear of an aircraft.
- The chassis of an automobile.
- The tractor treads of a tractor or tank.
- The underframe of a locomotive
- The undercarriage assembly of a train car or locomotive, known as a bogie, incorporating the train wheel sets, suspension, brakes and, in powered units, the traction motors

== See also ==
- Bicycle frame
- Container chassis
- Locomotive bed
- Locomotive frame
- Motorcycle frame
