= Accurizing =

Process of improving the accuracy and precision of a gun

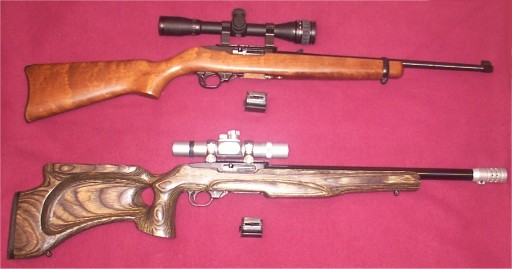
Ruger 10/22 carbines, before accurizing (top) and after (below). Externally visible changes are the target-style stock, the more vertical thumbhole grip, the free-floated bull barrel, and a muzzle brake.

Accurizing is the process of improving the accuracy and precision of a gun (firearm or airgun).

For shooting sport, accuracy is the gun's ability to hit exactly what the shooter is aiming at, and precision is the ability to hit the same place over and over again in a repeatable fashion. Both are the goals of accurizing, which generally concentrates on four different areas:

- Usability: Enhancements that give the shooter a firmer and more controlled hold on the firearm, as well as a more consistent trigger pull. Better design ergonomics is often employed, such as adjustable buttstocks and grips with more vertical angles that are natural to the human hand and wrist (e.g. pistol grip). Spirit levels are often mounted to prevent canting, which can vary the points of impact. Weapon mounts such as bipods, monopods, benchrests, shooting sticks or simply sandbags can provide a more stable and relaxed platform for the shooter, and devices such as muzzle brakes or compensators can also be used to help counter the muzzle rise from recoil and re-establish aim faster and more precisely for repeated firing. The use of suitable slings can also help shooters to stabilize their aim when shooting off-hand while standing or squatting.
- Tolerances: Parts that better fit together will shift less, or shift more consistently, under recoil. Rifle bedding is one of the most common practices of such accurizing procedure. Adequate screw torque setting between the action and the stock is also important for the overall rigidity of the system. Some companies, such as Savage Arms, have even introduced features like floating bolt head to provide better bolt-breech engagement for more adequate breech seal and headspacing.
- Harmonics: The act of firing a gun generates a rapid pressure increase within the barrel bore, causing the barrel to resonate and vibrate in a rope-like fashion. The resultant harmonic oscillations of the barrel affect the terminal phase of the projectile's internal ballistics and in turn the initial status of its external ballistics, and therefore need to be minimized or tuned to limit their effects on accuracy. Generally, the harmonic effects are proportional to the square of the barrel length, and so are generally only of concern in long guns such as rifles but not handguns. Some external accessories, called tuners or de-resonators, can also be mounted onto the barrel to alter the harmonic wave pattern so that the node is shifted as near to the muzzle as possible. Airguns have significantly lower barrel pressure and are far less affected by barrel harmonics than firearms.
- Projectile propulsion consistency: In airguns, the inbuilt powerplants themselves provide the propulsive force to the projectile, so tuning the gun alone is usually sufficient for accurizing as long as the projectiles' weights and shapes are uniform. Firearms, however, rely purely on oxidative chemical reaction of the powder within a cartridge to provide propulsive force, and any slight variations in powder load and combustion efficiency will affect the internal ballistics of the gun, even if the projectile weights and shape are the same. This means that in addition to the gun itself, consistent ammunition performance is also extremely critical for accuracy with firearms. While some manufacturers produce match-grade ammunition with smaller tolerances, it is common for shooters of high-precision disciplines to handload and fine-tune their own ammunition. Furthermore, the rapid gas expansion that occurs when the projectile leaves the muzzle also barometrically affects flight behaviour, so muzzle devices such as flash hider and suppressor can also be used to modulate the escaping gas and improve the consistency of shots.

The key to an accurate firearm is consistency. Getting everything to happen the same way for every shot is key to producing small groupings, and there are a large number of issues to be addressed in achieving an accurate firearm. The keys to firing an accurate shot are a firm but not overtight grip, the ability to get a good sight picture and a controlled squeeze of the trigger. The ability to manage recoil is also important in heavily recoiling calibers, both to aid in possible additional shots, and to prevent the user from developing a fear of the recoil.

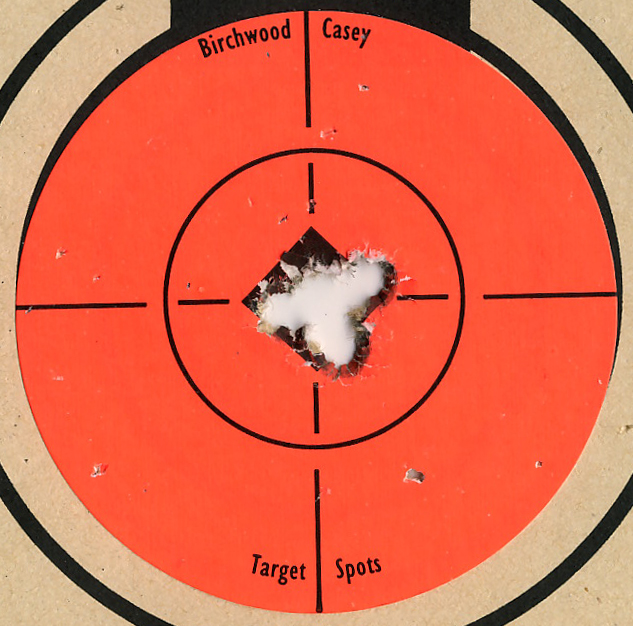
Sample 5-shot group measuring about 7 mm (0.28 in) at 91 m (100 yd), which corresponds to an angular size of about 0.08 mrad (0.26 moa).

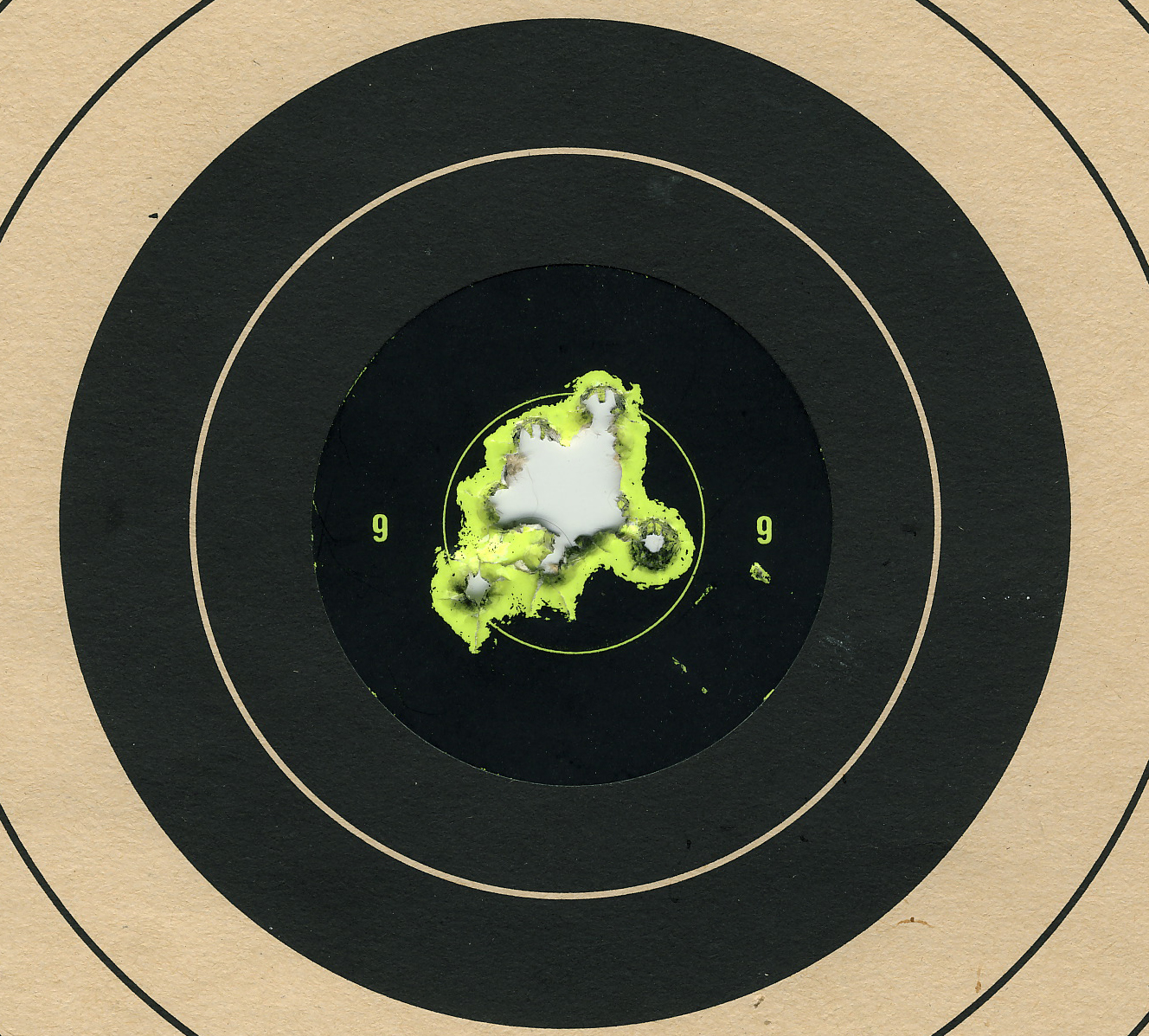
Same rifle and load, 25 shots at 91 m (100 yd). Note that the group size is about double, measuring about 15 mm (0.59 in) at 91 m (100 yd), which corresponds to an angular size of about 0.15 mrad (0.51 moa).

== Determining accuracy ==
Determining accuracy is not always a straightforward task, as it depends on a large number of variables.

=== Factors affecting accuracy ===
The accuracy of a shot relies on many different factors, which can be broken down into three broad categories: the firearm, the cartridge, and the shooter. Accurizing generally refers to the processes that are applied to the firearm. Techniques relating to producing accurate ammunition are covered in internal and external ballistics, and handloading, and just like accurizing a firearm, the goal is to produce the most consistent possible results. The shooter must also be consistent, and this means that the fundamentals of marksmanship have to be followed rigorously; any failure on the part of the shooter to remain focused and consistent can result in a bad shot. It's common to use a benchrest or a vise when evaluating ammunition or a weapon for accuracy to eliminate human error.

=== Measurements ===
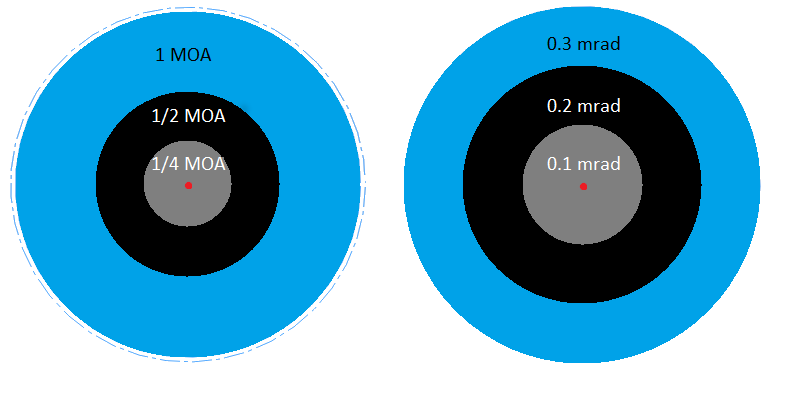
Comparison of minute of arc (moa) and milliradian (mil) .

Since adjusting the point of impact to match the point of aim is relatively simple with any type of adjustable sights, the primary goal of accurizing is to increase the precision of the firearm, which is generally measured by looking at the dispersion of a number of shots fired at the same point of aim. An ideal group would be one where all shots land in a hole no larger than the diameter of a single bullet; this would indicate zero dispersion. The most common way of measuring groups then is to measure the edge to edge distance of the farthest holes, and subtract the bullet diameter, which gives the center to center or c-c measurement of the group. This can be expressed in linear measures (a 30 mm group at 100 m, or a one inch group at 100 yards) or in angular measures (a milliradian or MOA group). Groups for rifles are traditionally shot at either 100 meters or 100 yards (91 m). At 100 yd a minute of arc equals 1.047 inches (26.6 mm), and the one MOA group (approximately 1/3 or 0.3 mil) is a traditional benchmark of accuracy. Handguns are generally used at closer ranges, and are tested for accuracy at their intended range of use. Also of importance is the number of shots fired. Statistical likelihood says the fewer shots that are fired, the smaller the dispersion will be. 3 or 5-shot groups are acceptable for zeroing the sights and rough accuracy estimates, but most shooters consider 10-shot groups to be the minimum for accuracy comparisons.

=== Defining accuracy ===
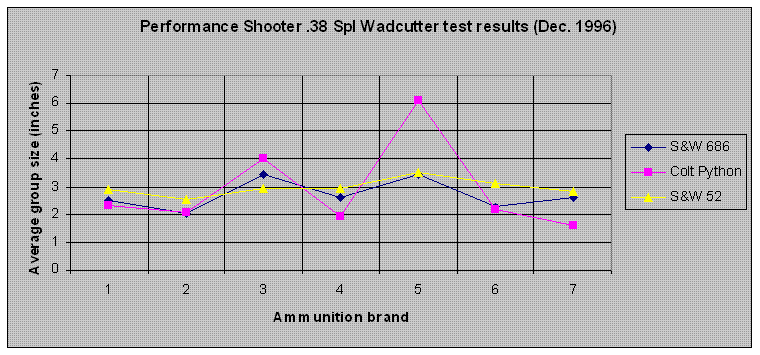
Graph showing the results of an accuracy test using 3 different revolvers and 7 different brands of ammunition.

Even defining accuracy can be problematic. An example of this can be shown by the following tests, run by Performance Shooter magazine in December, 1996. The magazine was testing seven brands of .38 Special wadcutter rounds in a semi-automatic pistol and two different revolvers: a Smith & Wesson Model 52, Smith & Wesson Model 686, and a Colt Python Target model, with five, six and eight inch long barrels, respectively. Ten groups of five shots were fired and measured from each revolver with each ammunition. Click on the image at right to see a larger view of the graph of average group sizes for each type of ammunition and each revolver. The average group size for the overall test was 72 millimetres (2.85 in).

Based on average group size, the winner was the Model 686, which shot an average group of 68 millimetres (2.69 in) across the brands of ammunition, with a standard deviation between ammunition types of 14 millimetres (0.54 in). However, the Model 52, while shooting slightly larger groups at 73 millimetres (2.88 in), was far more consistent across the brands, with a standard deviation of only 7.6 millimetres (0.30 in), and was the most consistent performer of the test. However, if the ammunition was tuned to the gun, the clear winner was the Python, which averaged just 43 millimetres (1.69 in) with its favored brand of ammunition. The Python was also by far the pickiest, however, turning in the largest groups at 154 and 102 millimetres (6.08 and 4.0 in) averages with its least favorite brands, for a standard deviation of 41 millimetres (1.6 in).

Based on this test, answering the question "Which is the most accurate?" becomes a matter of opinion. The 686 shot the best average groups. However, as the Python showed the best performance with one brand of ammunition, it might be the best choice if that brand of ammunition were acceptable for the application in question. If a consistent supply of ammunition were a problem, then the 52 might be the best choice, since it showed the least sensitivity to differences in ammunition.

=== Testing methodology ===
As the goal of accurizing a firearm is to improve its accuracy, the way accuracy is measured becomes important. A firearm used primarily as a hunting weapon will need to be accurate on the first shot from a cold, clean barrel, while one used for target shooting may be allowed fouling shots before the first shot for record is fired. Issues of portability or restrictions of certain competitions may limit the alterations that can be made. In addition, every firearm is different, and processes that yield good results on one may not affect another.

Another issue in measuring accuracy is the method by which the gun is secured for the test. The most accurate shooting position is a supported position, such as firing from a benchrest with the firearm well-supported by a shooting rest or sandbags; this eliminates much of the shooter's potential for error and will generally result in much smaller groups than firing from an unsupported position. Even for a firearm that is going to be shot offhand, accuracy testing from a machine rest will provide an idea of the ultimate attainable accuracy.

== Usability ==
No matter what the potential laboratory accuracy of a firearm is, it doesn't really matter if a human shooter can't fire it well under a set of real conditions. A firearm that fits the user well is an advantage over a poorly fit one.

=== Trigger ===
The dynamics of the trigger are one of the most important aspects of usability, since any movement of the firearm caused by pulling the trigger can affect the placement of the shot. Trigger pulls are relative, however. Compare a sport like action shooting, which emphasizes speed and uses relatively close targets with large scoring zones on the targets, to bullseye shooting, which uses distant targets with tiny scoring zones. While both types of trigger need a predictable pull, bullseye shooters demand a much higher degree of precision.

==== Analysis of the trigger pull ====
The trigger pull consists of three stages:

1. Takeup or pretravel, which is the movement of the trigger which happens before the sear moves.
2. Break, the movement during which the trigger moves the sear past the point of release.
3. Overtravel, which is the distance a trigger moves after the sear releases.

The takeup is the least critical stage of the trigger pull, and individual preferences vary widely. Two-stage triggers, for example, consist of a noticeable takeup, followed by a distinct increase in the force required to pull the trigger, followed by the break. A single-stage trigger, on the other hand, has no discernible movement before the break. Fully adjustable triggers will provide a two-stage pull, and the option of reducing the first stage travel to zero, essentially making the trigger a single-stage trigger.

The break is a far more critical stage of the pull, as it happens just prior to the shot being fired. Here again, individual preferences vary; some shooters prefer a soft break, where there is a smooth but discernible amount of trigger travel during firing, while others prefer a crisp break, with a heavier weight and little or no discernible movement.

The overtravel can be the most critical factor in the trigger pull, as any movement caused at this point will happen as the shot is fired. This is especially important with firearms where there is a sudden release of resistance when the sear breaks, such as in double-action triggers. An overtravel stop will arrest the motion of the trigger just after the break, and prevent movement. Over travel is not always considered bad by some, as the force of the trigger finger does not impact on the gun directly after sear release.

==== Improving the trigger pull ====
A Crosman air pistol trigger mechanism, unmodified (top) and with a sear engagement adjustment (bottom).

An adjustable trigger may have ways to adjust all of these stages, plus trigger location. For example, a first stage or takeup adjustment might include weight and travel, a second stage or sear engagement adjustment might include weight and travel, and a trigger stop adjustment would limit the overtravel.

While adjustable triggers may provide the greatest level of control, much can be done with standard non-adjustable triggers. Careful hand fitting and polishing of parts, addition of high precision or adjustable aftermarket parts, or fabrication of new parts can greatly improve most triggers. Care should be taken, however, since trigger work requires a great deal of care and precision, and a bad trigger job can easily render a firearm highly unsafe or unusable.

==== Liability issues ====
Most manufacturers ship firearms with fairly heavy, nonadjustable triggers, colloquially known as lawyer triggers. This is out of concern for liability; firearms are inherently dangerous, and allowing the user to adjust the trigger, or even implying such adjustments can be made, exposes the manufacturer to lawsuit. Likewise, manufacturers of aftermarket parts expose themselves to similar liability issues.

=== Sights ===
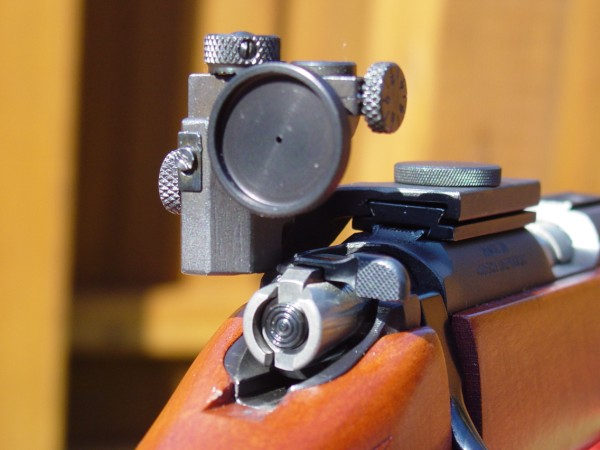
A target aperture sight, mounted on the receiver. This rearward mounting position provides a long sight radius, and the small aperture provides a long depth of field and precise alignment

A firearm's sights help its user to align the barrel with an intended target. In some cases the only refinement in a "target" firearm over a standard model is improved sights.

Adjustable sights are essential for most target shooting, as they allow compensation for variables such as target range and ammunition type. Firearms with non-adjustable or coarsely adjustable sights cannot give their holders the ability to reliably shoot on target in changing conditions. Improvements in visibility and sharpness of a target image provided by some sights can also improve users' aim and consistency.

Typical open sights with a blade, post or bead near the muzzle and a notch over the breech are good for quick alignment but far from ideal for accuracy. An aperture sight mounted closer to the user's eye and farther from the front sight tightens accuracy by lengthening the sight radius while helping the person take better advantage of the improvement. Some of these "peep sights" provide precise, repeatable adjustments for long range shooting with no need for tools. Telescopic and reflex sights offer advantages to people with less experience or poor eyesight by bringing both target and aiming point into focus, while "scopes" also magnify and brighten the image. Drawbacks such as weight, bulk, and complexity can also affect a shooter's performance.

=== Stocks and grips ===
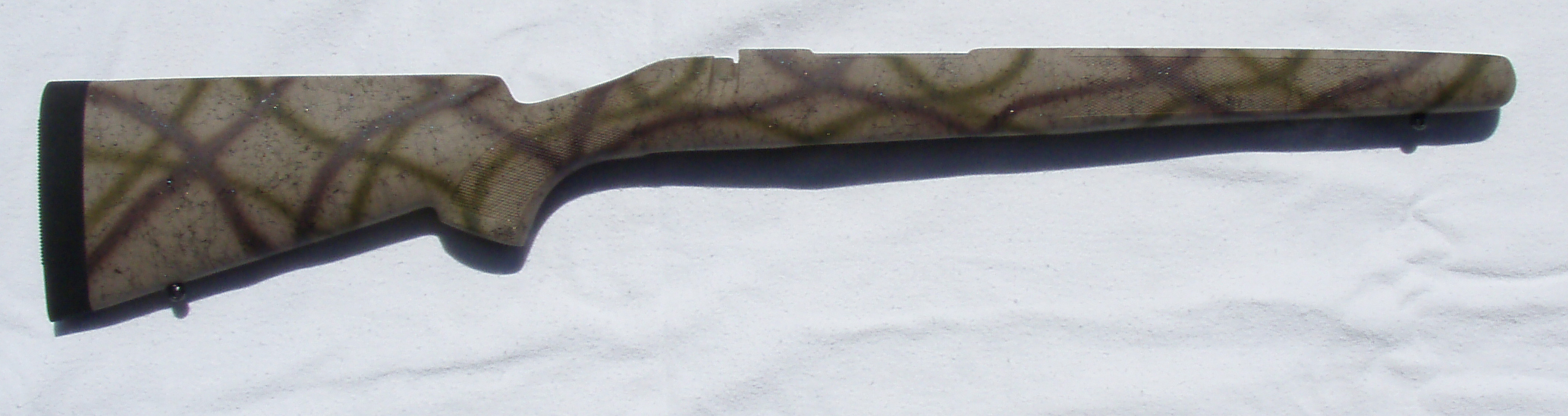
Rifle stock with camouflage finish

A good stock or grip allows the shooter to have a relaxed but firm grip on the firearm. This can range from minor changes such as texturing grip surfaces or adding a wide, beavertail type grip safety to a 1911, all the way to a custom-built, anatomically designed grip that "fits like a glove". Key features are:

- Structure. A firearm that is properly affixed to the stock, allowing the barrel to float freely as opposed to touching other surfaces, will be more accurate. A stock should also allow the action to be affixed securely and provide a good bedding surface, which sometimes requires the use of epoxy resins.
- Comfort. This allows the shooter to relax and concentrate on shooting.
- Control. The shooter must be able to hold the firearm on target and provide consistent movement under recoil.
- Positioning. The shooter must be positioned correctly and consistently, allowing easy use of the sights, and a clean trigger pull.

==== Gripping surfaces ====
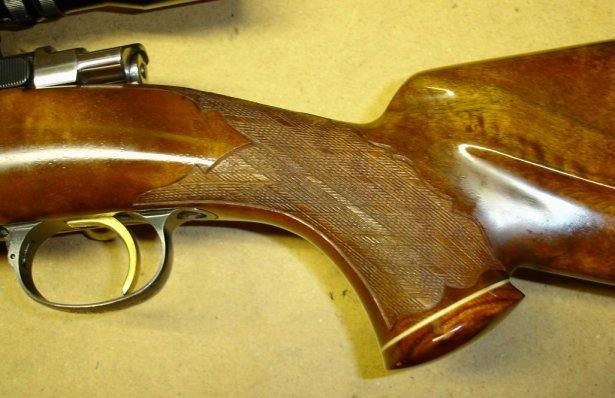
Custom grip checkering

Gripping surfaces, particularly on handguns, are often designed to provide a large degree of friction to prevent the shooter's grip from shifting. This can be done by either using a material that provides a high friction, such as rubber, or by adding texture to the grips. Traditionally wood grips and stocks are provided with checkering, a process where V-shaped grooves are cut into the wood at an angle to each other, leaving a pattern of pyramidal projections in the wood. Another process uses a punch to leave a random pattern of dents in the surface, called stippling; this process is better suited to complex curves than checkering, and is often found on anatomical grips. Handguns with plastic frames will often have stippling or checkering molded into the frame.

==== Handgun grips ====
Grips for handguns, especially ones used in single handed disciplines such as bullseye and Olympic handgun shooting, are critical to good accuracy. The grip provides very little control compared to a rifle stock, and so a good fit is required to give the shooter control over the gun and isolate the trigger finger movement. Aftermarket parts makers provide a wide range of grips for handguns, allowing shooters to find grips that are suitable for their hands.

Competition handgun grips are anatomically shaped, and are often custom fitted to the shooter's hand. An ideal grip will fit the contours of the shooter's grip, so that the knuckles fall into position the same way every time. The ideal grip should allow the shooter to repeatedly grasp the gun, bring it up to shooting position with eyes closed, and be correctly aligned and on target when their eyes are opened; this means the grip provides a consistent placement, and minimal corrections when aiming. Contrary to commonly stated rules of thumb, the handgun should not line up with the forearm when gripped, but rather point slightly outwards, so that when held to shoot, the sights line up with the shooter's eye. In cross-dominant shooters, the angle will be more pronounced. Thumbrests, finger grooves (if well fitted), and palm rests all provide control over recoil. An adjustable palm rest is a desirable feature as well, as it allows the grip to be adjusted to fit the shooter's hand as it swells and contracts over time.

==== Rifle and shotgun stocks ====
Stocks for long guns are not as often changed as handgun grips, but a well fitted stock can make a significant difference in accuracy. For shotguns in particular, the placement of the shooter's face on the stock provides the rear aiming point, and the correct drop, toe alignment, and cast-off can greatly enhance accuracy. This was traditionally accomplished by steaming and bending the stock, but a simpler solution for modern guns is a set of shims that alter the angle of the stock.

Rifle stocks have similar issues of fit, and though the use of sights makes this less vital than in a shotgun, a good fit still helps the shooter to relax and concentrate on fundamentals. The shape of a rifle stock should be suited to its intended use. High combs and vertical pistol grips are ideal for high mounted target sights or scopes and careful, deliberate shooting such as encountered in traditional target shooting, metallic silhouette, or varmint hunting, as they provide a maximum point blank range and ideal trigger control. However, these features are not well suited for a typical hunting or action shooting rifle, where the rifle must be brought from a ready position to a shooting position quickly and smoothly. This use favors low sights or scopes, and a shallow pistol grip angle. Rounded forearms are well suited for firing from offhand, while a square-bottomed forearm provides a stable base for shooting off of a sandbag or other rest.

Recoil is also a key issue in rifle stock design. Heavy recoiling rifles should have wide butts, with a good recoil pad to absorb the force of recoil, and a comb that is straight or slopes down towards the action, so that it does not push into the shooter's face under recoil.

Some target shooting disciplines allow the use of various devices to help support the rifle, and these are often mounted to an accessory rail beneath the forend. Target slings, unlike carrying slings, are used just on the off hand, usually with a hand stop, and provide stability to the shooter's hold. Palm rests are another device that can be attached to the rail, to allow a shooter to lower their off hand and place their elbow into their body for support. Target stocks also are available with a large degree of adjustment, including length of pull, drop, comb height and angle, and buttplate angle and curvature.

=== Time considerations ===
The bullet does not leave the barrel as soon as the sear releases; rather, there is a delay between the release of the sear and the bullet exiting the barrel. During this time, any movement will move the firearm off target, and so this time should be minimized, especially for firearms that will be fired from an unsupported standing position. This delay can be broken down into two sections, the lock time and the bullet dwell time.

==== Lock time ====
Lock time is the time between the release of the sear and the ignition of the cartridge, and depends on the design of the firing mechanism. A lengthy lock time gives time for the shooter to drift off target, and so it is advantageous to minimize the lock time and reduce the window for error. Reductions in lock time are generally performed by lightening parts that move as part of the firing operation, such as the hammer and firing pin or striker, shortening the distance that parts, moving as components of the firing operation, have to cover, and using a more powerful spring. A short lock time is particularly desired when shooting with high precision at small targets. The lock time of conventional bolt-action rifles typically lie between 2.6 and 9.0 milliseconds. Further reductions in lock time, to near zero levels, can be achieved with electrical primers.

==== Bullet dwell time ====
The bullet dwell time is the time between ignition of the cartridge and when the bullet leaves the barrel. Like lock time, dwell time is a window for error, and can be minimized with a faster bullet or a shorter barrel. In some cases, a shorter barrel is desired to reduce dwell time, but without losing the sight radius of a longer barrel. In this case, a sight extension tube, or bloop tube, can be used. This is a tube that fits on the muzzle end of the barrel, providing support for the front sight, but that is bored to much larger than bore diameter. This provides the sight plane of a long barrel with less weight and dwell time.

To put lock time and bullet dwell time in perspective; the lock time of most conventional bolt action rifles varies between 2.6 and 9.0 milliseconds, while after cartridge ignition most rifle bullets travel through a high powered rifle barrel bore in 1.0 to 1.5 milliseconds. Mechanical bolt-action rifle trigger systems with a sub 2.0 millisecond lock time are applied in most purpose designed high end competition rifles.

== Clearances and Tolerances ==
The terms "clearance" and "tolerance" are very often confused and misused. Clearance is the distance between the surfaces of mating parts. Tolerance is the allowable variation of a dimension from its nominal (desired) value.

For example, a bolt with an outside diameter (OD) of 0.697 inches which is operating in a receiver with a bolt raceway inside diameter (ID) of 0.702 has a clearance of 0.005 inches. If the bolt OD has a nominal OD of 0.698 and a tolerance of ±0.001, then the bolt OD can randomly vary from 0.697 to 0.699 along its length, which will allow the bolt clearance in the 0.702 diameter raceway to vary from 0.005 to 0.003. Further, if the raceway also has a tolerance of ±0.001 from the nominal of 0.702, then its ID can vary from 0.701 to 0.703 along its length. That combination of tolerances can allow the bolt clearance to vary from 0.002 to 0.006. The point at which the 0.002 clearance occurs would likely cause binding and malfunction in most operational environments.

To ensure consistent, repeatable lockup, clearances between moving parts must be kept to the smallest value that will allow proper operation of the mechanism. This goal can be achieved by carefully hand selecting parts and precisely fitting them together, or by manufacturing new parts (bolt, receiver, barrel, etc. to precise dimensions using much tighter tolerances than production components. The best fits are generally attained by selecting slightly oversized parts (or altering stock parts to form an interference fit) and then lapping the mating surfaces to attain the desired fit (clearance).

Clearances cannot be too tight, however, or functionality will be compromised; this is very important in automatic and semi-automatic firearms, where there is a certain amount of energy extracted from the firing of the cartridge that must be used to cycle the action. Overly tight clearances mean that there is no place for lubricant and dirt to be, and this can bind the parts. However, except for cost considerations, it is always beneficial to minimize the tolerances applied to the manufacture of mating parts.

In some cases, stock parts are not sufficient for the task of producing a finished product with sufficiently tight clearances. In this case, it may be necessary to use specially fabricated parts, built either with minimal clearances (but to a very tight tolerance), or parts that are oversized and intended for hand fitting.

=== Barrel ===
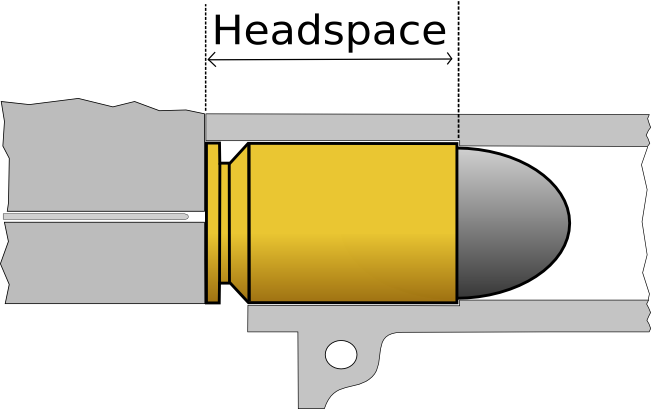
Headspace of a .45 ACP cartridge, which headspaces off the case mouth.

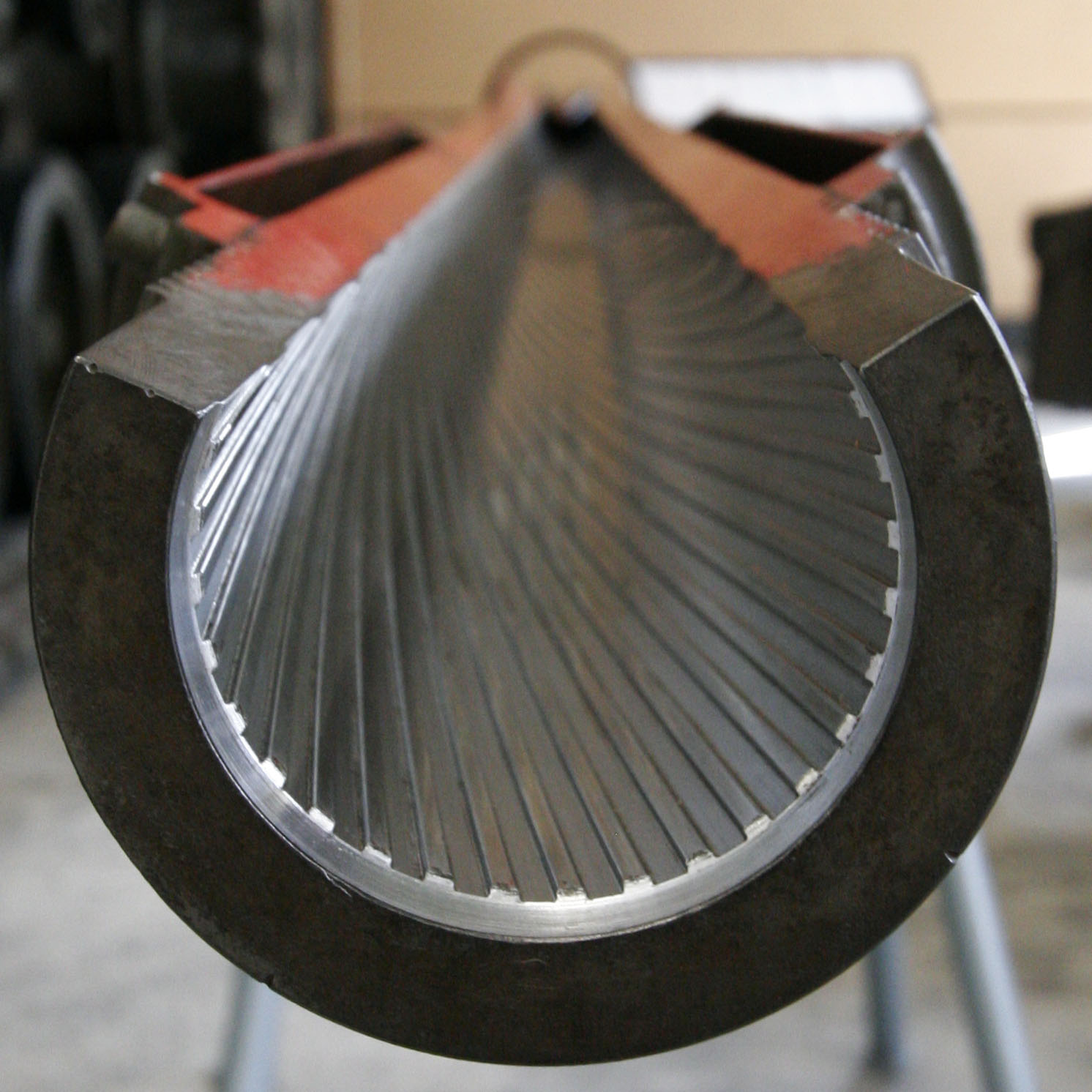
Cutaway of the barrel of a tank cannon, showing rifling on a large scale.

The barrel is one of the most important factors for accuracy, as a poorly made barrel may be beyond correction. Even a quality barrel must be well matched to the cartridge it will be firing. In most cases, it is not practical to fix a barrel whose bore is worn out, poorly or unsuitably rifled, or the wrong bore diameter; the primary exception to that is rimfire barrels, which can be inexpensively bored out and re-lined with a commercial barrel liner. If the barrel is unsuitable and relining is not an option, then an aftermarket or custom barrel is the best solution. However, if the bore is good, then there are a number of operations that can be done to the barrel to improve upon its accuracy.

==== Bore ====
Ideally, the bore must be cylindrical and the rifling geometry the same down the length of the bore. Some airgun rifles have a short cone towards the muzzle to improve the speed of the bullet.

A slight gain in the rifling twist, or a slight tapering down of the bore, will still ensure the tight fit of bullet to bore, so when selecting a barrel, the tighter or faster twist end should be chosen for the muzzle.

The twist of the rifling must match the intended ammunition for best accuracy. Rifling with too slow a twist will not stabilize long bullets, causing them to precess in flight; at its worst, this can result in the bullets tumbling in-flight and keyholing, where bullets strike the target sideways. Too fast a twist can also be a problem, as it can magnify problems in the bullet. A bullet whose center of mass is slightly off-center will diverge at a rate proportional to the rifling twist, so excess twist will result in greater dispersion. In practical terms, this is only a problem for rifles chambered for common military calibers where a variety of different loads exist. For example, the M16A1 rifle is unable to accurately fire bullets that are heavier than 3.6 grams (55 gr) due to barrel twist that is too slow to stabilize heavier bullets. Precision rifles typically come with barrels that are either tailor-made for a specific ammunition load or made according to the buyer's specifications.

Barrels can also benefit from lapping, not only because it makes the bore a more consistent diameter, but also because it polishes the bore. Barrel lapping should be done with the tool moving in the same direction as the bullet will move, so that any imperfections in the barrel will be smoothed out and thus not interfere with the passage of the bullet. A smooth, polished bore will not only hold the bullet better, but also reduce barrel fouling.

==== Chamber ====
Of great importance to accuracy is the fit of the ammunition to the barrel. The chamber should be concentric, and the throat sized just slightly larger than the bullet diameter. The cartridge must headspace correctly, be held firmly in place, concentric to the bore, and the bullet must fit the bore and be guided to engage the rifling cleanly. Once the bullet is engaged in the rifling, with a good seal and coaxial fit, it must stay that way. It is often possible to shorten a barrel slightly by removing material from the breech end and re-cut the chamber, which can correct many problems in the original chamber.

==== Crown ====
The crown is the muzzle face of the barrel. The crown's integrity is critical for two reasons:

1. It is the last part of the firearm touched by the bullet before it exits.
2. As the bullet clears the crown, it will release upwards of 34–69 megapascals (5,000–10,000 psi) of back pressure, which must be as uniform as possible.

While many barrel manufacturers recess the crown to protect it from accidental damage, it can still be damaged over time by cleaning rods that are too hard. It is also not uncommon for factory crowns to be cut slightly off-center, so that one side of the bullet exits slightly earlier than the other, and this will result in the bullet being pushed away from that side, causing a significant deflection in its path. A crown may be re-cut with relative ease, and this can fix any problems caused by a defective or damaged crown, by ensuring an even release of the bullet. An 11 degree crown has the best accuracy potential, and should be applied to a barrel to get the best gas flow at the bullet exit point of the barrel.

==== Stress ====
Any machining process on a barrel, whether it's boring, rifling, or turning the outside contour, will produce some stress in the steel of the barrel. This stress can cause the barrel to expand unevenly as it heats, causing shots to "walk" as the barrel heats and cools. To prevent this, careful post-machining heat treatment is often used to stress-relieve the barrels. The amount of good this does depends on the technique used to make the barrel. For example, the hammer forging method of manufacture leaves a significant amount of stress in the barrels, which could be addressed through stress-relieving heat treatment.

==== Wear ====
Barrel wear is also an important issue, particularly in high-powered firearms. High temperatures tend to erode the barrel at the throat, preventing the bullet from entering the rifling cleanly. One way to produce a long-lasting barrel is by the proper selection of materials. Stainless steels, such as 416, have been shown to have a longer life than the traditional 4140 chrome/molybdenum steels used for barrels. While the stainless barrels are not any more accurate than a 4140 barrel, they will maintain their accuracy longer in many applications, as they are more resistant to erosion caused by the heat of firing high-powered cartridges. One notable exception to this is the .50 BMG cartridge; competition shooters often fire high-precision lathe-turned bullets made from harder brass, bronze, or steel in this caliber, and the 4140 steel will stand up to this better than stainless.

==== Cryogenic treatment ====
Another commonly cited accurizing treatment for barrels is cryogenic treatment. This involves slowly cooling the steel down to liquid nitrogen temperatures, leaving it there for a time, and then slowly warming back to room temperature. This process converts remaining austenite in the steel to martensite. Many proponents of this process claim increased accuracy of the resulting barrels, but independent testing of the process by major manufacturers has shown no increase in accuracy. However, the conversion of austenite to martensite has been shown to result in easier machining and greater wear resistance on steels that tend to have significant amounts of retained austenite, such as stainless steels, and the process does appear to significantly affect the accurate life of stainless steel barrels.

=== Rifle stocks ===
A poor fit of the action to the stock is also a source of problems, and this problem is exacerbated by issues such as thermal expansion of metal parts during use, and swelling and contracting of wooden stocks with changes in humidity. These changes can affect accuracy either by allowing the action to shift under recoil, or by causing slight but accuracy-destroying bending of the barrel. By removing wood from areas of contact and, when needed, replacing it with a more stable substance that is precisely fitted, such as a fiberglass composite molded in place, a more stable, precise fit can be achieved. Other materials, such as composites or laminated wood, can also provide a stronger, more dimensionally stable stock than traditional woods can. Some stocks are even being made out of aluminum or other metals, for maximum stability.

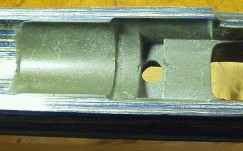
Bedding epoxy in a stock

The process of fitting the action to the stock is called bedding, and there are a number of different processes used. Glass bedding uses a fiberglass composite which is molded in place around the action. This can be as simple as bedding the recoil lug of a bolt-action rifle, or as complex as bedding the entire action and barrel channel. Pillar bedding uses precisely machined metal pillars in the stock which mate with the action, providing a strong metal-to-metal contact without the labor-intensive hand fitting required in glass bedding.

Many times it is advantageous to eliminate most or all contact between the stock and barrel, to eliminate potential accuracy-destroying interference in the barrel harmonics. To do this, stock material is removed along the barrel channel to leave a slight gap between the stock and the barrel; this is called free floating the barrel. With some designs, pressure bedding is preferred, where a single point of contact remains between stock and barrel near the forend. In both these cases, bedding the action is required to provide support for the floating or pressure bedded barrel. Since the action ends up supporting the mass of the barrel, a poor stock to action fit will result in unacceptable shifting.

=== Action ===
The primary purposes of the firearm action are holding the cartridge in place in the chamber, and providing a way to ignite the propellant. In a single-shot action, little additional functionality is provided, while in a semi-automatic firearm the action also taps energy from the firing process for cycling to fire the next round. From an accuracy perspective, the primary goal of the action is to achieve a consistent placement of the cartridge in the chamber every shot.

The term blueprinting, borrowed from high-performance engine builders, is also often applied to the process of manufacturing or altering parts to have a desired (usually tighter) clearance than stock parts, and tightening the tolerances on critical dimensions to reduce clearance variations. Blueprinting a firearm action involves similar operations designed to tighten the clearances of a firearm action to ensure consistent and correct seating of the cartridge in the chamber. A typical set of blueprinting operations for a bolt-action firearm would include the following:

1. Bolt blueprinting operations:
  1. Squaring the bolt face to the bolt diameter
  2. Ensuring the bolt is concentric in the action
  3. Squaring and lapping the locking lugs
  4. Sleeving the bolt (adding material to increase the diameter), then machining down for a precise fit to the action
2. Receiver blueprinting operations:
  1. Making the action threads for the barrel concentric with the action centerline
  2. Making sure the breech face is square to the action centerline
  3. Making sure the recoil lug is square to the action
  4. Squaring and lapping the locking lug recesses

These operations ensure that not only is the cartridge consistently and correctly positioned when chambered, but also that it remains correctly positioned during firing.

=== Revolver specific issues ===
The defining characteristic of a revolver is the revolving cylinder, separate from the barrel, that contains the chambers. Revolvers typically have 5 to 9 chambers, and the first issue is ensuring consistency among the chambers; if they are not consistent then the point of impact will vary from chamber to chamber. The chambers must also align consistently with the barrel, so the bullet enters the barrel the same way from each chamber.

The throat in a revolver is part of the cylinder, and like any other chamber, the throat should be sized so that it is concentric to the chamber and very slightly over the bullet diameter. At the end of the throat, however, things change. First, the throat in a revolver is at least as long as the maximum overall length of the cartridge; if otherwise the cylinder cannot revolve. The next step is the cylinder gap, the space between the cylinder and barrel. This must be wide enough to allow free rotation of the cylinder even when it becomes fouled with powder residue, but not so large that excess gas can be released. The next step is the forcing cone. The forcing cone is where the bullet is guided from the cylinder into the bore of the barrel. It should be concentric with the bore, and deep enough to force the bullet into the bore without significant deformation. Unlike rifles, where the threaded portion of the barrel is in the chamber, revolver barrels threads surround the breech end of the bore, and it is possible that the bore will be compressed when the barrel is screwed into the frame. Cutting a longer forcing cone can relieve this "choke" point, as can lapping of the barrel after it is fitted to the frame.

A consistent lockup is important to keep all these parts in line, and revolvers are prone to abuse that can damage these parts, adversely affecting the accuracy and even safety of the revolver. This lockup consists of two parts, the crane to frame lockup, and the cylinder bolt to cylinder lockup. Many swing-out cylinder revolvers only support the cylinder securely at the rear, and flipping the cylinder open and closed can bend the crane and prevent the cylinder from lining up parallel to the bore. The cylinder bolt, which engages the bottom of the cylinder through a slot in the frame, should provide a relatively tight lockup, and not drag the cylinder during rotation or pop loose when the hammer is cocked at a reasonable speed. Fanning a revolver can batter the cylinder bolt and prevent a solid lockup.

== Harmonics ==
A Jay Young built unlimited class "railgun" using a 51 millimetres (2 in) diameter Lilja Precision barrel.

During firing, the chamber pressure rises from atmospheric pressure to, in a typical rifle cartridge, pressures of about 340 megapascals (50,000 psi) within microseconds. This rapid increase in pressure causes the barrel to vibrate at a certain natural frequency, much like a tuning fork. The point in time at which the bullet exits the barrel will determine the orientation of the muzzle relative to its rest position. Exiting near a peak or valley in the motion means the muzzle is relatively stationary, and shot dispersion will be minimized; exiting between a peak and valley means the muzzle is rapidly moving, and shot dispersion will be greater.

There are two ways to address harmonics; reducing the amplitude with a stiffer barrel, or working with the natural frequency to minimize dispersion.

=== Stiffness ===
Stiffness of a barrel is proportional to the fourth power of the diameter, and inversely proportional to the third power of the length. Because of this, short, thick barrels will vibrate with high frequency and low amplitude, and long, thin barrels will vibrate with a low frequency and high amplitude. Due to the effect of length, barrel harmonics are primarily a concern with rifles. By using the shortest and/or fattest barrel possible, the amplitude of the vibrations can be minimized to the point that they are irrelevant to accuracy. Unlimited class benchrest shooting barrels, where weight is of very little consequence, have very large diameters; an outside diameter of 2 inches (5 cm) is not uncommon.

While standard rifle barrels taper from breech to muzzle, high precision rifles will often use a barrel with far less taper, called a heavy barrel, sometimes leaving the barrel cylindrical all the way to the muzzle, called a bull barrel. Either technique greatly increases the stiffness of the barrel by enlarging the average diameter, but this process adds significant weight as well. This can greatly increase the mass of the barrel, however; going from a lightweight sporter contour to a heavy barrel contour can double the mass, and a going to a bull barrel contour can more than triple it. Fluting, consisting of grooves machined in the outer surface of the barrel to remove material, can reduce the weight and improve heat dispersion while maintaining most of the stiffness.

Barrel tensioning devices are a way of gaining stiffness with minimal increases in weight. They do this by placing a lightweight sleeve, often made of aluminium or a carbon fiber composite, around the barrel, and then using a nut attached to the end of the barrel to tension the barrel and place the sleeve under compression. This serves to keep the muzzle closer to concentric and coaxial to the breech during vibration.

=== Harmonic tuning ===
Drawing from US Patent 5,423,145, for a Rifle-Barrel Harmonic Vibration Tuning Device

The other solution is to work with the barrel's natural vibration, and tune the components so that the bullet exits the barrel as it is moving the slowest. The simplest approach to harmonic tuning is to concentrate on the ammunition. The internal ballistics of a given cartridge will determine its dwell time, or the time it takes from ignition to exiting the barrel. By experimentally matching the dwell time to the barrel's frequency, the best load for a particular firearm may be found. Similarly, handloading gives the shooter the opportunity to very precisely control the bullet velocity, and experimentally choose the optimum velocity.

If it is not possible or desirable to match the bullet to the barrel, there are a number of devices marketed to allow the barrel to be tuned to match the ammunition. There are a number of models of these that work in different ways. One type uses an adjustable damper or pressure bedding point to allow the shooter to find the "sweet spot", where it will do the most good at damping the vibrations that are affecting accuracy. Other tuners work by using an adjustable weight on the muzzle to alter the length of the resonant portion of the barrel, and allowing the frequency to be matched to the ammunition.

== Airgun powerplants ==
The difference between an airgun and a firearm is the way in which the power to launch the projectile is provided. In a firearm the projectile propulsion is provided by an exothermic chemical reaction, and in an airgun is it provided primarily by mechanically compressed gas, typically either air or carbon dioxide (CO_{2}), though these gases are used primarily for convenience and some airgun variants run on other gases, such as refrigerants like R-134a commonly used in airsoft guns, or hydrogen used in light-gas guns.

There are three primary types of powerplant used in airguns:

- Spring-piston, which uses a spring-loaded piston to compress air within an air pump at the moment of firing
- Pneumatic, which uses pre-compressed air stored in a reservoir within the gun
- Compressed gas, which uses a small removable gas cylinder now ubiquitously stores liquid CO_{2} (Powerlet)

Each method has its own advantages and disadvantages, and different areas that can be addressed to ensure consistency.

The most powerful systems will produce velocities near or exceeding the speed of sound with lightweight pellets; this, however, is not a good thing where accuracy is concerned. The commonly used airgun diabolo pellets have a poor ballistic coefficient, and quickly lose velocity; when they drop below the speed of sound, they will often tumble. However, high velocities sell airguns; if accuracy is desired from these high velocity guns, then heavier pellets should be used to keep the velocity down. This will provide not only better accuracy, but better downrange preservation of velocity and kinetic energy.

=== Pneumatic ===
Pneumatic systems use compressed gas for power, usually compressed air. This air may be compressed by the gun for each shot, in a single stroke or pump (multiple stroke) gun, or it may be precharged by an external compressor.

A single stroke system, as the name implies, uses a single stroke of the pump to compress a cylinder full of air, which is then all used for one shot of the gun. Single stroke systems are both inexpensive and capable of high accuracy due to the simplicity and consistency of the single stroke design. The downsides are the low power provided, though this is not a handicap in standard 10 meter airgun target shooting. When Daisy introduced an inexpensive single stroke pistol, the model 717, in the late 1970s, American Olympic shooter Don Nygord demonstrated the potential of the design by shooting an accurized version in a California State air pistol championship, and winning the gold medal. The (at the time) US$40 Daisy, with a better rear sight and an adjustable trigger added, shot as well as the US$400 Olympic class air pistols it was competing against.

More powerful is the pump system, which is a slightly more complex version of the single stroke design. Rather than leaving the air in the piston when compressed, the pump airgun has a reservoir to contain the compressed air, allowing multiple pumps to be used, typically 2 at a minimum, up to 10 pumps for full power. The ability to vary the power, however, is the pump airgun's major disadvantage when it comes to accuracy, as it makes it very difficult to get a consistent charge. The increased power of a pump airgun makes it an attractive choice for many shooters, and there are steps that can be taken to improve consistency, such as modifying the air chamber so that not all the air is exhausted in a shot.

The last type of pneumatic airgun is the precharged pneumatic. This is both an old and a new design; some of the earliest airguns, such as the model carried by Lewis and Clark, were of this type, as are many new cutting edge models. The precharged pneumatic uses an external source of compressed air, either an external pump or a high pressure reservoir such as a SCUBA tank, to fill a reservoir. The reservoir can be a small, single-shot one, such as in the Brocock Air Cartridge system, or a large, multi-shot tank. The key to top accuracy in a precharged pneumatic is a consistent pressure. With multishot systems (as are most), the pressure in the reservoir will drop with each shot fired, so the best way to achieve consistency is with a pressure regulator, which provides a steady, but lower, pressure at the valve, for as long as the reservoir pressure remains higher than the regulated pressure. Regulators are also generally adjustable, so a low pressure setting will provide many shots of lower power, while a high pressure setting will provide a few high power shots.

=== Piston ===
Piston airguns, often called "springers", are unique in many ways. Since the firing process involves a fairly massive piston suddenly moving to compress the air, they have a significant "kick", generally called "recoil" (though this is not the same as firearm recoil). The recoil begins when the piston starts to move forwards, which pushes the rest of the gun backwards. The recoil then stops suddenly as the piston reaches the end of its travel, and is brought to a stop by the cushion of high-pressure air trapped between the piston and pellet. This recoil can be brutal on the gun in high-powered models, and will loosen screws, shift sights, and break scopes not designed specifically for the unique recoil of piston airgun—all of these can lead to poor accuracy. In addition to the recoil, piston airguns have a long lock time, as the piston must compress the air before the pellet begins to move, and the gun is moving due to the recoil during this time. Spring airguns require a special technique to fire, to ensure that the gun moves very consistently during this recoil. The preferred method is a very loose hold, to allow the gun to move back; this means that a piston airgun will not shoot the same from a bench. All accuracy testing and sighting in must be done in the same position the gun will be shot from, otherwise the results will be different. Piston airgun recoil cannot readily be dealt with without a significant redesign; in some cases the action can be mounted on a sliding rail, or two counter-recoiling pistons can be used, but this requires significant changes to the design. The resulting gun will be far less sensitive to the shooter's hold, and thus much easier to shoot accurately.

The first step to accuracy of a piston gun is to ensure that all screws are secure and the sights are rated for use on a piston airgun. Another potential issue regarding accuracy is resonance in the spring used to power the piston in most airguns. The spring will vibrate strongly as the piston stops, and this will affect the harmonics of the gun. A gas spring will, if one can be fitted to a given model, provide vibrationless action, though with some loss of efficiency and even sharper recoil. Spring driven pistons also respond well to accurizing; careful fitting of parts and use of quality lubricants and spring damping tar can reduce the level of vibrations and improve accuracy.

=== CO_{2} ===
CO_{2} is commonly found in multishot airguns, from the cheapest plinkers to Olympic class target guns, though the latter are facing competition from regulated precharged pneumatics. CO_{2}'s advantage is that it is stored in a liquid form, rather than a gas, and as such provides a greater power density. The liquid also provides a constant pressure, the vapor pressure, as long as there is liquid remaining in the reservoir. The downside to CO_{2} is that it is dependent upon the vapor pressure, which changes significantly with temperature. This is of primary concern to outdoor shooters, who may shoot in widely varying temperatures, or for rapid fire shooters, as rapid release of the gas results in a rapid drop in the temperature of the liquid.

The issue of temperature change is not readily addressable, other than by the use of readily adjustable sights, so the shooter can adjust the sights to match the point of impact based on the current ambient conditions. In the case of rapid fire, there is a solution that can provide far greater stability for many guns. The original CO_{2} airguns were filled from an external source of CO_{2}, but in 1954 Crosman introduced the 12 gram Powerlet, a compact, disposable tank now ubiquitous in inexpensive CO_{2} airguns. The downside to these is that the small quantity of CO_{2} liquid cools down quickly, leading to a rapid drop in velocity and a changing point of impact. By moving to a bulk fill system, with a much larger tank, there is more liquid available, and the greater mass will cool far more slowly.
