= Free-floating barrel =

Firearm design

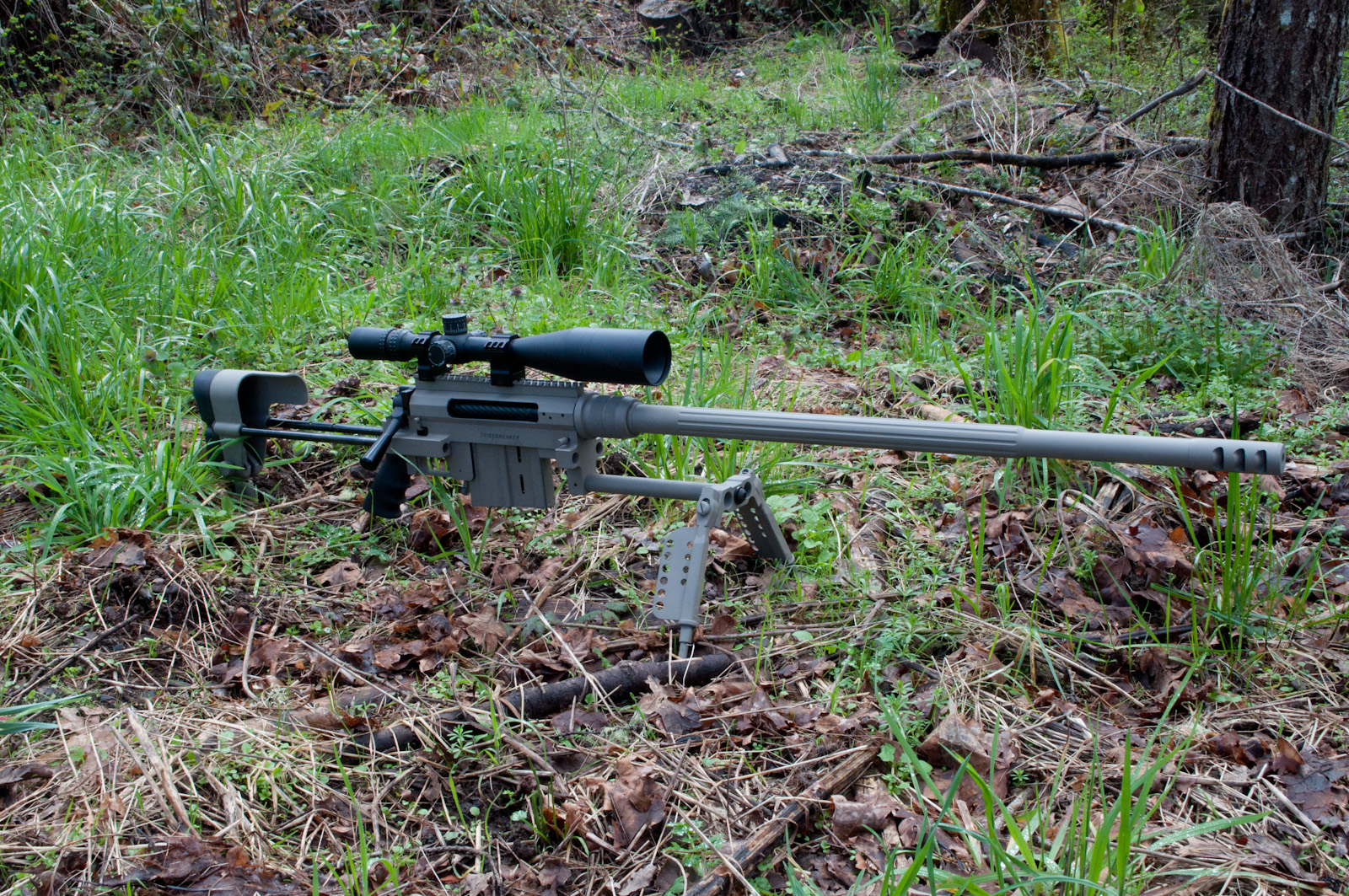
Thor XM408 Windrunner

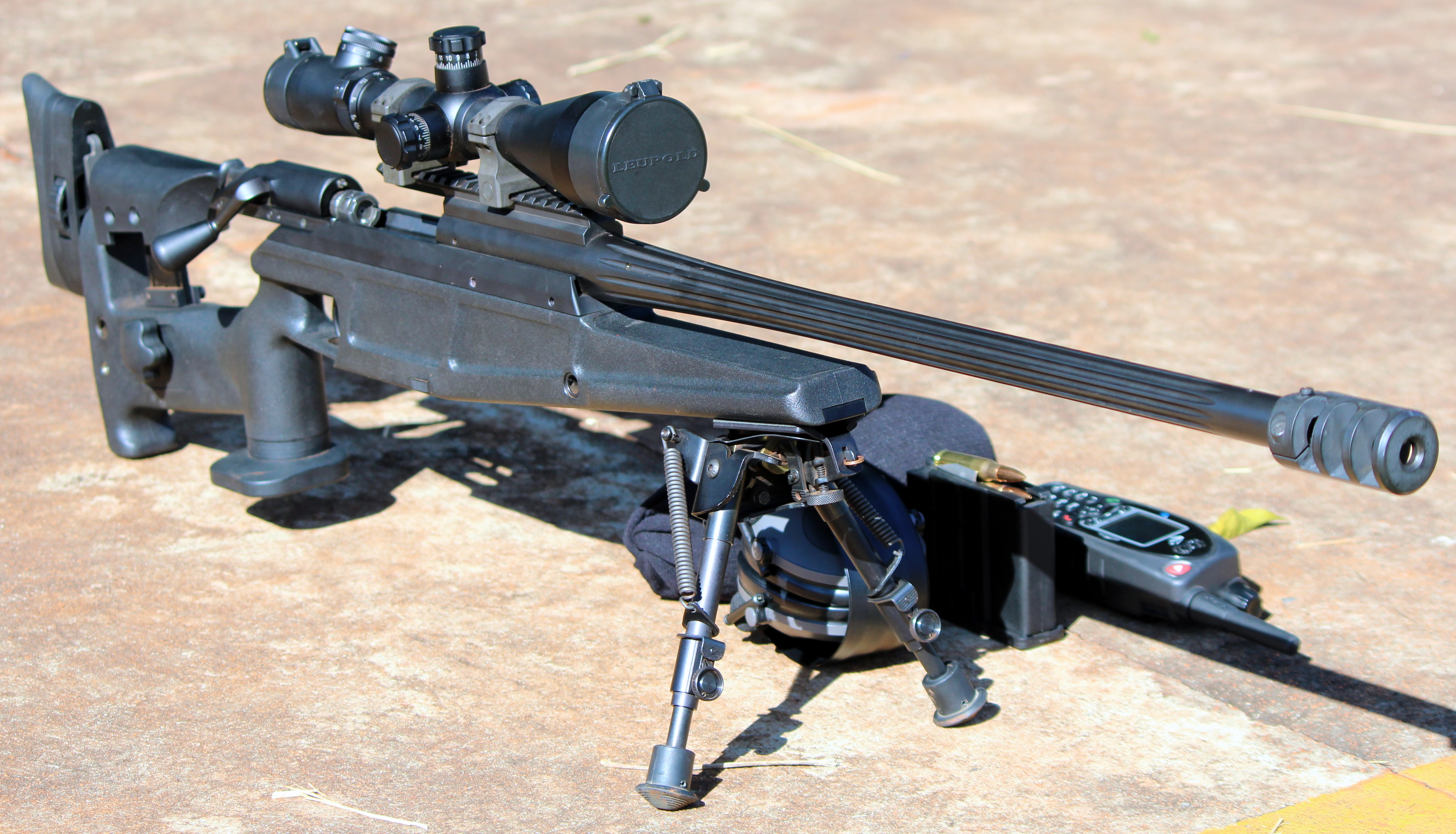
Blaser R93 Tactical

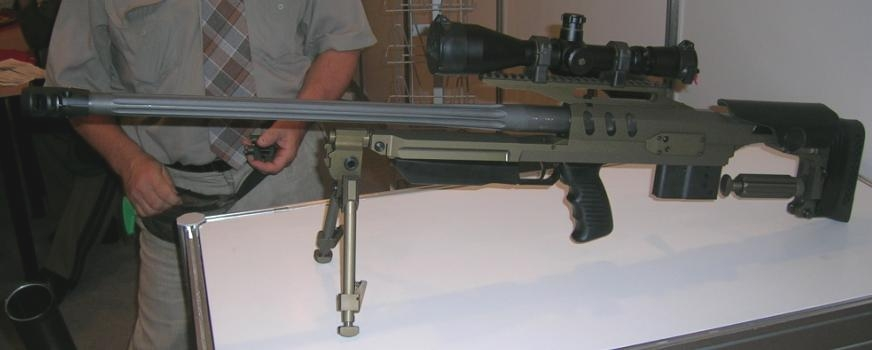
Bor rifle

In firearms, a free-floating barrel is a design where a weapon's gun barrel touches neither the handguard nor the stock, often as an accurizing technique. Free-floating barrels are common in many AR-style rifles and precision rifles, particularly match grade benchrest ones.

With conventional rifles, the gun barrel rests in contact with the fore-end of the gunstock, sometimes along the whole length. If the stock is wooden, environmental conditions or operational use may warp the wood, which may also cause the barrel to shift its alignment slightly over time, altering the projectile's external ballistics and thus the point of impact. Contact between the barrel and the stock affects the natural frequency of the barrel, which can reduce accuracy especially when the barrel gets hot with repeated firing. The effect of the stock on the barrel can cause the barrel to vibrate inconsistently from shot to shot, depending on the external forces acting upon the stock at the time of the shot. Such vibrations affect the bullet's trajectory, changing the point of impact.

A free-floating barrel is one where the barrel and stock—or the barrel and rail in case of M16/AR-15 pattern rifles—do not touch at any point along the barrel's length. The barrel is attached to its receiver, which is attached to the stock, but the barrel does not touch any other gun parts except perhaps the front sight, which is often mounted on the barrel. This minimizes possible variance in mechanical pressure distortions of the barrel alignment, and allows vibration to occur at the natural frequency of the barrel consistently and uniformly.

Alternatives include using a stock made from composite materials or metal chassis which do not deform as much under temperature or humidity changes, or a wooden stock with a fiberglass contact area ("glass bedding"). Stocks which contact the barrel are still popular for many utility weapons, though most precision rifle designs have adopted free-floating barrels.

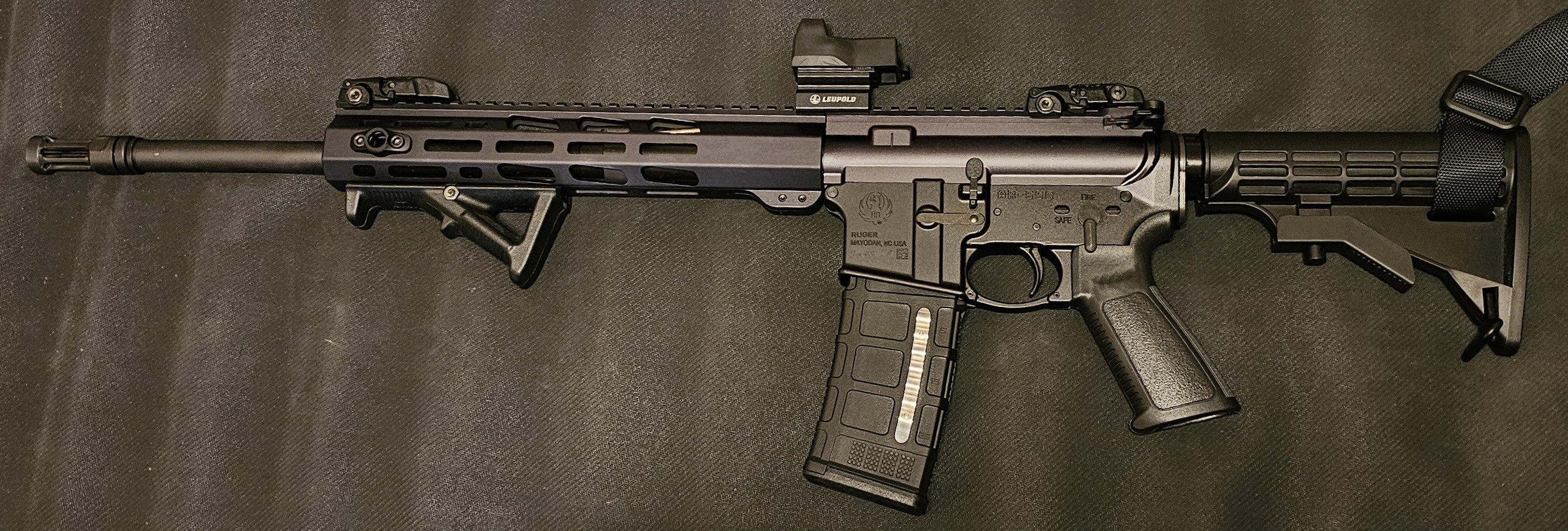
Ruger AR-556 Free Float Handguard Model uses a free-floating barrel and rail system

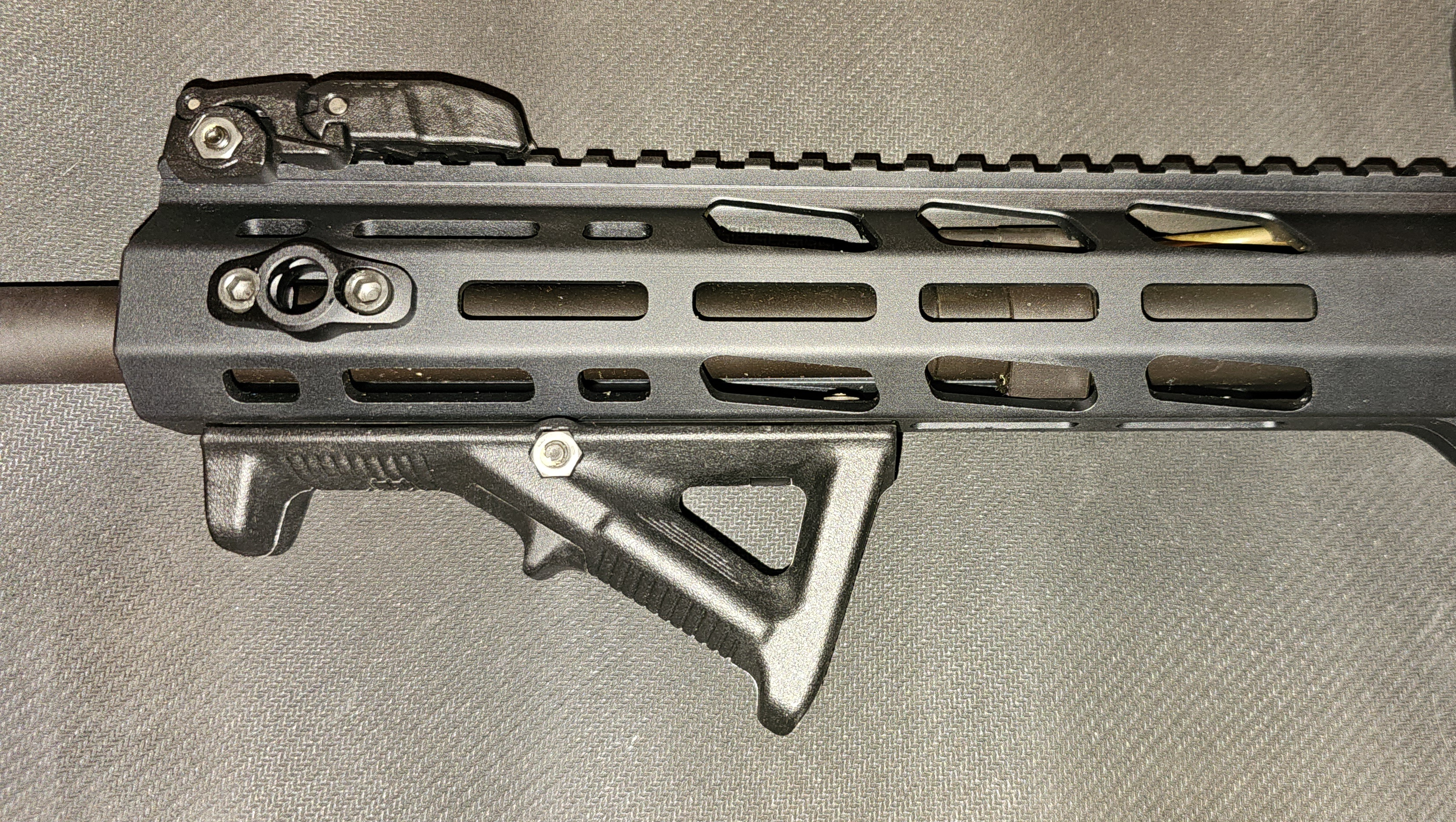
Ruger AR-556 Free Float Model's free-floating M-LOK rail and barrel

== See also ==
- Glossary of firearms terms
