= FN Special Police Rifle =

FN Special Police Rifle (SPR)
- Type: Sniper rifle
- Place of origin: United States

Service history
- Used by: Federal Bureau of Investigation

Production history
- Manufacturer: FN Herstal
- Variants: A1, A1a, A2, A4, A3G, A5M

Specifications
- Mass: 4.9–7.5 kg depending on variant
- Length: ~1015 mm (40") with 20" barrel ~1120 mm (44") with 24" barrel
- Barrel length: 508 mm (20 in) or 610 mm (24 in)
- Cartridge: .308 Winchester; .300 Winchester Short Magnum
- Action: Bolt-action
- Feed system: .308 Winchester: 4-round detachable box magazine or; 5-round internal box magazine.300 Winchester Short Magnum: 3-round internal box magazine
- Sights: M1913 rail for Telescopic sight

The FN Special Police Rifle (FN SPR) is a bolt-action sniper rifle marketed by FNH USA, a subsidiary of the Belgian company FN Herstal.

== Design details ==
The rifle is manufactured at the U.S. Repeating Arms Company (owned by FN de Herstal) to FN specifications using Winchester Model 70 actions. All current models of the SPR come in one of a variety of McMillan synthetic stocks. The earliest rifles were shipped in the H-S Precision aluminum chassis fiberglass version of the Winchester Marksman stock. While these "First Generation" rifles were simply dropped into the aluminum bedding blocks of the H-S Precision stock, the later guns are all glass bedded by hand.

FN Special Police Rifles of all iterations are noted for being both very accurate (0.5 MOA or somewhat less is not uncommon) and very low maintenance, featuring Parkerized metal finish, synthetic stocks, and a chrome-lined bore in the barrel. A chrome-lined bore offers a more durable, more corrosion resistant, and easier-to-clean barrel for the end user to maintain and is rarely found on precision bolt-action sniper rifles. The barrels of the "First Generation" rifles were said to be made from the hammer-forged blanks used for M240 General Purpose Machine Gun production at the FN Manufacturing Inc. plant in Columbia, South Carolina. Later barrels are said to be from hammer-forged blanks intended exclusively for FN Special Police Rifle production.

For .308 Winchester SPR rifles, featuring a detachable 4-round magazine feeding system, this system can be replaced by the Tactical Box Magazine (TBM) kit. The Tactical Box Magazines are available in 5-round or 10-round capacity.

== Variants ==
- FN SPR 1st Generation: HS Precision Marksman-pattern stock, heavy 26-inch barrel.
- FN A1: McMillan A3 stock, heavy 24-inch barrel.
- FN A1a: McMillan A3 stock, heavy 20-inch barrel.
- FN A2: McMillan A4 stock with buttpad spacers and adjustable cheekpiece, 24-inch barrel.
- FN A4 Shooting System: FN A2 with scope and bipod.
- FN A3G: McMillan A3 stock with buttpad spacers and adjustable cheekpiece, 24-inch heavy fluted barrel.
- FN A3G Shooting System: FN A3G with scope and bipod.
- FN A5M: McMillan A5 stock with buttpad spacers and adjustable cheekpiece, 20-inch heavy barrel or 24-inch heavy fluted barrel.
- FN A5M Shooting System: FN A5M with scope and bipod.
- FN A5M XP: FN A5M with 5/8 x 24 tpi threaded barrel.

== Users ==
- United States: The SPR was one of two rifles (along with the H-S Precision HTR) approved in 2004 by the Federal Bureau of Investigation for use of by their Hostage Rescue Team. The FBI variant has the model name FNH SPR-USG (USG – US Government), and is also called the A3G by FN.
