= Rifle bedding =

Firearm accurizing process

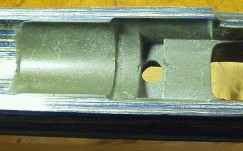
Bedding epoxy in a stock

Rifle bedding is a gunsmithing process of providing a rigid and consistent foundation for a rifle’s operational components, by creating a stable and close-fitting bearing surface between the gun's functional parts (i.e. the receiver housing the barrelled action) and its structural support (i.e. the stock) that do not deform with heat, pressure and moisture, prevent noisy/loosly fitting components (IE: "battle rattle") or shift under the shear stress of the recoil from firing. The bedding process is often an aftermarket modification, and is done for the goal of accurizing the rifle and (to a lesser extent) prolonging the service life of the stock.

== Purpose ==
=== Increasing accuracy ===
Bedding increases accuracy in part by relieving stress on the action. The rifle's action will rarely sit flush in the stock without bedding. This causes the action to flex when tightening the fixing screws that hold the action to the stock. If the stock is wooden, it will also expand or shrink significantly with environmental changes such as temperature and moisture, which causes changes in action screw tension. These result in inconsistencies during operation, which degrades accuracy. Bedding will create a flush bearing surface for the action and prevent flexing.

Bedding also reduces minute movements of the action within the stock. Without bedding, the action may be more likely to shift after each shot. If the action shifts and does not return to same spot in the stock the rifle will lose the ability to maintain zero.

The presence of the bedding material also adds a small amount of extra height to the action, and creates more of a gap between the barrel (which is fixed to the front of the action) and the fore-end of the stock, allowing the barrel to be better floated, which helps improve accuracy.

=== Prolonging stock life ===
Bedding can help prolong the life of the stock. Repeated shearing forces from recoils can create focal wear and chips in the stock surface, and eventually ruining the stock with repeated usage. Bedding redistributes stress over a larger area, reduces shifting between the action and the stock, and creates a hardier, protective epoxy coating over the softer stock contact surface, thus protecting it from mechanical wears over time.

== Methods ==
Bedding involves molding an epoxy-based material onto the stock recess to fill away the gaps within its contact surface with the receiver (known as glass bedding), and/or inserting a metal cylinders (which act as compression members) around the action screws to reduce compressive shifting (known as pillar bedding). The receiver and the stock are sometimes fastened indirectly through an intermediate piece (usually made of rigid materials such as aluminium alloy) known as a bedding block, which multifunctionally serves as a larger pillar, a bedding surface and even recoil lugs. The contact interface on the stock may also be substituted by a metallic bedding frame known as a chassis, which is either embedded within the stock, or even completely replacing the stock like the lower receiver on many modern modular semi-automatic rifles.

Skim bedding refers to an adjustment of a glass bedding job, usually after wear and tear from use, which consists of removing a small layer of the bedding material — usually up to around 3 mm (0.12 in) — and adding new bedding material on top of that.

Several different bedding methods can be used depending on the type of stock, desired results and level of experience of the person attempting to perform the bedding. Methods include:

- Full contact bedding of the action with the barrel floated.
- Full contact bedding of the action and the barrel.
- Full contact bedding of the action with a pressure-bearing pad for the barrel.
- Pillar bedding of the action with the barrel floated.
- Full length aluminum action bedding block.

Full contact bedding of the action with the barrel floated is a very common method for long range rifles with a heavy barrel. A free-floating barrel will generally produce the greatest accuracy. However, a pressure pad under the barrel just forward of the action can sometimes improve accuracy by acting on barrel harmonics and reducing stress on the action from the weight of the barrel. Pillar bedding can be used to float the action as well as the barrel, but the process is more difficult.

== Precautions ==
If performed improperly, bedding can destroy a rifle. Mechanical locking occurs when bedding material is allowed to harden in holes or around protrusions on the action. If locking occurs, the action can be permanently fixed to the stock. Extreme measures may have to be taken to separate the stock from the action, possibly destroying one or both. Improperly applied or insufficient release agent can cause the bedding material to bind to the metal. If the trigger assembly is not removed prior to bedding, epoxy can seep into the trigger assembly and ruin it.

== See also ==
- Accurizing
- Benchrest rifle
- Chassis
- Glossary of firearms terms
