= Hogue (company) =

American firearms company

Hogue, Inc.
- Company type: Private
- Industry: Firearms accessories
- Founded: 1968; 58 years ago
- Founder: Guy Hogue
- Headquarters: Henderson, Nevada, U.S.
- Key people: Aaron Hogue, Patrick Hogue, Neil Hogue, Jim Bruhns
- Products: Pistol grips, stocks, holsters, knives
- Website: www.hogueinc.com

Hogue, Inc., is an American company that manufactures and distributes firearms accessories, knives, and other related products. Founded in 1968 in California, and now based in Henderson, Nevada, the company is best known for its pistol grips.

== History ==
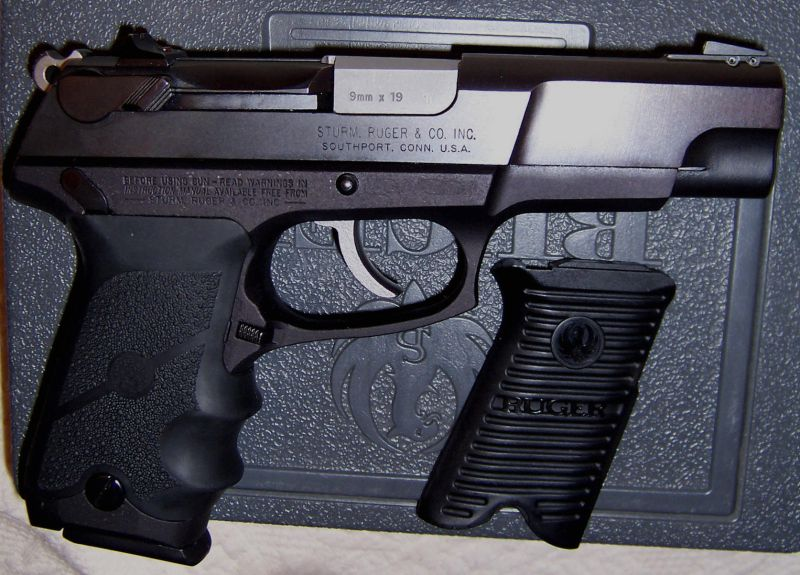
Ruger P89 with Hogue grips installed; original grips also shown for comparison

The company was founded by Guy Hogue in 1968, after he started making pistol grips that would properly fit his hand. As a member of the Los Angeles Police Department, Hogue also started making grips for fellow officers. His grips became so popular that he retired from his job in law enforcement to focus on his own business.

The company has expanded over time and now provides grips for at least 16 different brands of handguns, manufactured in four different Hogue facilities. Grips are produced in rubber and in wood, in multiple colors and textures. The company also makes holsters and rifle stocks.

In 2011, the company started producing knives, which led to a move of its headquarters to Nevada, "due in large part to a California statute that prohibits the manufacturing of automatic knives." The company states that it manufactures knives for Heckler & Koch and SIG Sauer, and that Hogue knives "are issued to all branches of the U.S. Military."

Upon Guy Hogue's retirement, leadership of the company passed to two of his sons, Aaron and Patrick.
