= Mauser Jagdwaffen GmbH =

German hunting rifle manufacturer

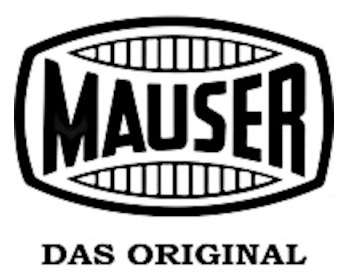
- Company type: GmbH
- Industry: Firearms
- Predecessor: Mauser
- Founded: 1999; 27 years ago
- Headquarters: Isny im Allgäu, Germany
- Products: Hunting rifles
- Owner: Lüke & Ortmeier Gruppe
- Website: www.mauser.com

Mauser Jagdwaffen GmbH is a German manufacturer of hunting rifles in the Lüke & Ortmeier group.

== History ==
In 1999, the civilian gun segment of the Mauser firearms company was separated from the military segment and was purchased by the German investors Michael Lüke and Thomas Ortmeier. Mauser Jagdwaffen GmbH (German for 'Mauser Hunting Weapons Ltd.') was established as a new company, with its base being situated in Isny im Allgäu in southern Germany. Rifles are produced there exclusively for the hunting/sporting sector. Mauser Jagdwaffen GmbH resumed the production of the Mauser models M 98 and M 98 Magnum again, according to the original drawings and respective Mauser patents of the Gewehr 98 and Karabiner 98k.

In 2000, Mauser Jagdwaffen GmbH and its European sister companies (J.P. Sauer & Sohn, Blaser and Swiss Arms) were unified by the German investors Michael Lüke and Thomas Ortmeier under the SIGARMS name.

In 2003, Mauser Jagdwaffen GmbH introduced the M 03 hunting/sporting bolt-action rifle.

On October 1, 2007, SIGARMS officially changed its name to SIG Sauer. This change of name reflected how SIG Sauer had become one of the largest firearms manufacturing entities in the world. It is also the fastest-growing firearms maker in the United States, expanding its operations and increasing sales nearly 50% since 2005. SIG Sauer has recently tripled its work force and invested eighteen million dollars into state-of-the-art manufacturing facilities and equipment.

The various contemporary Mauser rifle models are produced in Isny im Allgäu, Germany, and sold under the brand name Mauser Jagdwaffen GmbH.

== Mauser rifles (2003) ==
- M 03 Basic
- M 03 Extreme
- M 03 Trail
- M 03 Match / Jagdmatch
- M 03 Solid
- M 03 Africa
- M 03 Arabesque
- M 03 De Luxe
- M 03 Old Classic
- M 03 Alpine
- M 12 (2013)
- M 18 (2018)
- M 98 (1898)
- M 98 Magnum

== Mauser M2 handgun ==
The Mauser M2 is a Mauser branded handgun offered in the United States. It is a self-loading, double-action only pistol initially offered in .45 ACP and later in .40 S&W and .357 SIG. The Mauser M2 is dimensionally similar to the SIG P229 pistol, also manufactured by SIGARMS. Unlike most SIGs, it utilizes a rotating barrel like a Beretta. It is also striker-fired, like a Glock pistol. The Mauser M2 was intended for the civilian concealed carrying market in the US. It was designed with the legalities of the time in mind, like low capacity magazine, magazine disconnect safety and manual safety (located on the rear of the grip). The front sight dove-tail of the Mauser M2 is compatible with Sig-Sauer P220/P226/P229 series pistol front sights.

The Mauser M2 was offered by SIGARMS, though by 2006, it no longer appeared on their website. SIGARMS purchased the Mauser name for pistol manufacture in 1999. This pistol also is no longer supported by SIG Sauer nor Mauser Jagdwaffen GmbH. The Mauser M2 ceased production in the 2004-2005 time frame. It has not been imported by SIG in over four years, and the Mauser Oberndorf plant where the M2 was manufactured has been closed.
