= Sauer & Sohn =

German firearms manufacturer

J. P. Sauer und Sohn GmbH
- Type: Private
- Industry: Firearms
- Founded: Suhl, Thuringia, 1751; 275 years ago
- Headquarters: Isny im Allgäu (Baden-Württemberg), Germany
- Products: Handguns, rifles
- Services: Gunsmithing, training
- Owner: Lüke & Ortmeier Gruppe
- Website: Sauer & Sohn

J. P. Sauer und Sohn GmbH (Sauer & Sohn) is a manufacturer of firearms and machinery and is the oldest firearms manufacturer still active in Germany. The products of this company are frequently referred to as Sauer.

== J. P. Sauer und Sohn ==
=== History ===
The first Sauer company was founded in 1751 by Lorenz Sauer in Suhl in the duchy of Saxe-Hildburghausen, this locality being known as Waffenstadt Suhl in the past because of its many gunmakers. J.P. Sauer & Sohn is the oldest recorded gun maker in Germany. In 1815 Johann-Gottlob Sauer started managing the firm; in 1835 Johann Paul Sauer became manager. In 1840 that Johann Paul and his son, Lorenz Sauer created the new name and trademark of J.P. Sauer & Sohn.

=== Timeline (highlights) ===
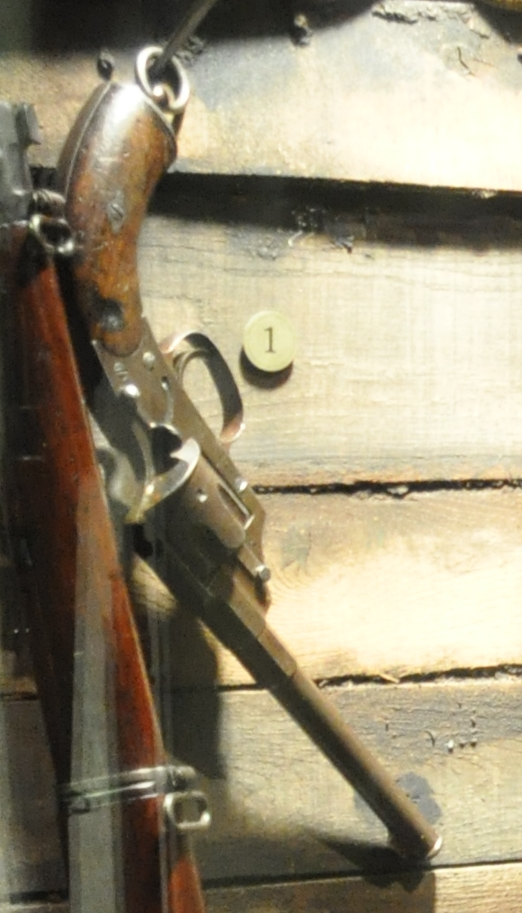
M.1879 single-action Reichsrevolver, National Firearms Museum

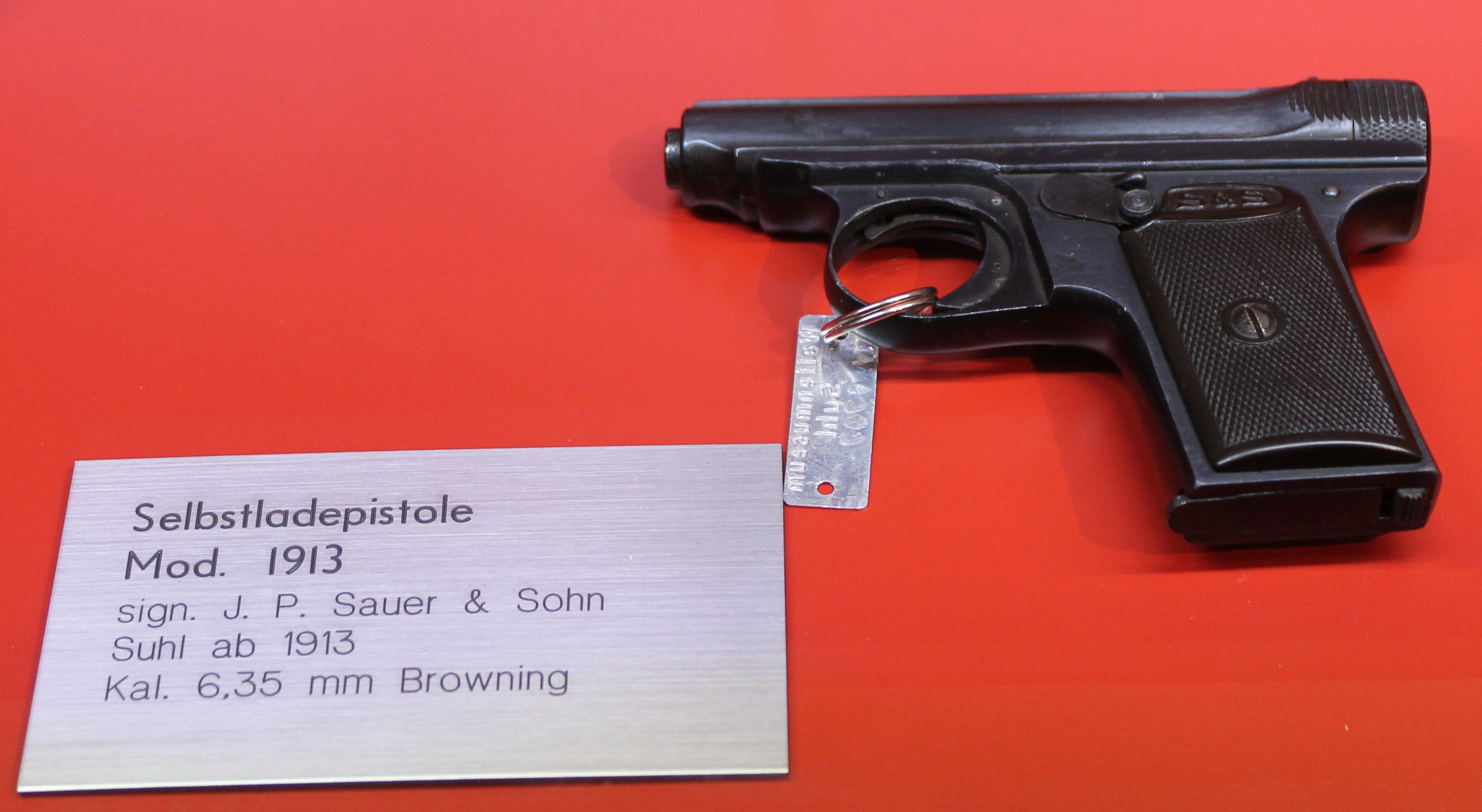
Self-loading pistol M.1913

- 1751 — Company founded by Lorenz Sauer, producing mostly military arms for a long time.
- 1774 — Lorenz found partner, company now is "Lorenz Sauer und J. S. Spangenberg. Coop."
- 1811 — Sauer becomes first company to provide firearms to a German government (Saxony).
- 1815 — Johann Gottlob Sauer assumes management.
- 1835 — Johann Paul Sauer assumes management, founds his own workshop in 1836.
- 1839 — Johann Paul partners with Ferdinand Spangenberg, company is "Spangenberg & Sauer".
- 1840 — Johann Paul Sauer and son Lorenz create a new name and trademark J. P. Sauer & Sohn.
- 1844 — Luxurious double-barrel musquets (early shotguns), hunting arms become more important now.
- 1849 — Coop with Spangenberg and Heinrich Sturm, company now "Spangenberg, Sauer u. Sturm, Suhl".
- 1873 — Johann Paul Sauer and his sons Rudolf and Franz found the company J. P. Sauer & Sohn.
- 1879 — Company patents backloading rifle.
- 1880 — Company starts hunting rifle manufacture in Berlin, as there is more and more demand now.
- 1881 — Patents for innovative "Drilling" (combination gun), won a Gold Medal at World Exhibition.
- 1882 — First produced product catalogue known, Rudolf and Franz Sauer owners of the company.
- 1884 — Branch "Vereinigte Waffenfabriken H. Pieper, Lüttich und J. P. Sauer & Sohn, Suhl" opens, Berlin.
- 1891 — Patented extractor for folding guns and patent for an expanding bullet.
- 1893 — Company makes first real shotgun, coop with "Krupp" for steel for special rifle barrels.
- 1894 — Franz Sauer is now the sole owner of the company.
- 1898 — First Sauer semi-automatic pistol introduced.
- 1902 — Company patents a kick-bolt action.
- 1909 — Patent for single trigger design for double guns.
- 1904 — Franz Sauer's son Hans becomes partner of the company.
- 1911 — Franz Sauer's son Rolf-Dietrich becomes partner of the company.
- 1915 — Company introduces the Model 25 Drilling.
- 1922 — Shotgun model "Habicht" (Hawk), first typewriter "Stolzenber-Fortuna" produced.
- 1924 — Franz Sauer dies.
- 1930 — Model 30 Drilling introduced, also in "light steel".
- 1931 — Model 31 "Bockbüchsflinte" or "Bockdoppelbüchse"/cape gun introduced.
- 1932 — Model 32 Drilling created, subsidiary in Berlin is closed because of Great Depression.
- 1933 — Model 33 "Bockflinte" (over/under shotgun), also as "Bockbüchse" and "Bockbüchsflinte".
- 1936 — Models 36 and 37 'Kipplaufbüchsen' created, trigger devices for double guns, double safety.
- 1938 — Safety device for drilling guns to choose which barrel to use.
- 1941 — Sauer produces military arms almost exclusively again until end of war, e.g. "Karabiner 98k".
- 1941 — The "Drilling M30" ("Luftwaffedrilling") for airplane crews, made by Sauer & Sohn in Suhl.
- 1945 — Factory taken over by Soviets, production resumed for war reparations, Hans Sauer captured.
- 1948 — Communist regime in DDR (East Germany) is established, Rolf-Dietrich moves to West Germany.
- 1950 — Fortuna (ex Sauer), Ernst-Thälmann-Werk (ex Haenel), Merkel, Greifelt merged to "MEWA Suhl".
- 1950 — Rolf-Dietrich Sauer sells rights so a new enterprise in BRD (West Germany) is being formed.
- 1951 — Newly established "J. P. Sauer & Sohn" in BRD, first in Düsseldorf, year later Eckernförde.
- 1953 — In East Germany, VEB Ernst Thälmann Works still using "Sauer" brand name on their products.
- 1966 — In West Germany, "Sauer & Sohn GmbH" acquired by Kompressorenfabrik Wilhelm Poppe, Kiel.
- 1970 — East German firms integrated into "VEB Ernst Thälmann" (use of "Sauer" product name ceases).
- 1972 — Rolf-Dietrich Sauer dies.
- 1976 — Sauer & Sohn Maschinenbau (ex "Poppe") sells "Sauer & Sohn hunting arms", part of "SIG".
- 2000 — "SIG" holding sells "SIG Sauer" name and arms business to Lüke & Ortmeier Gruppe holding.

=== World War II ===
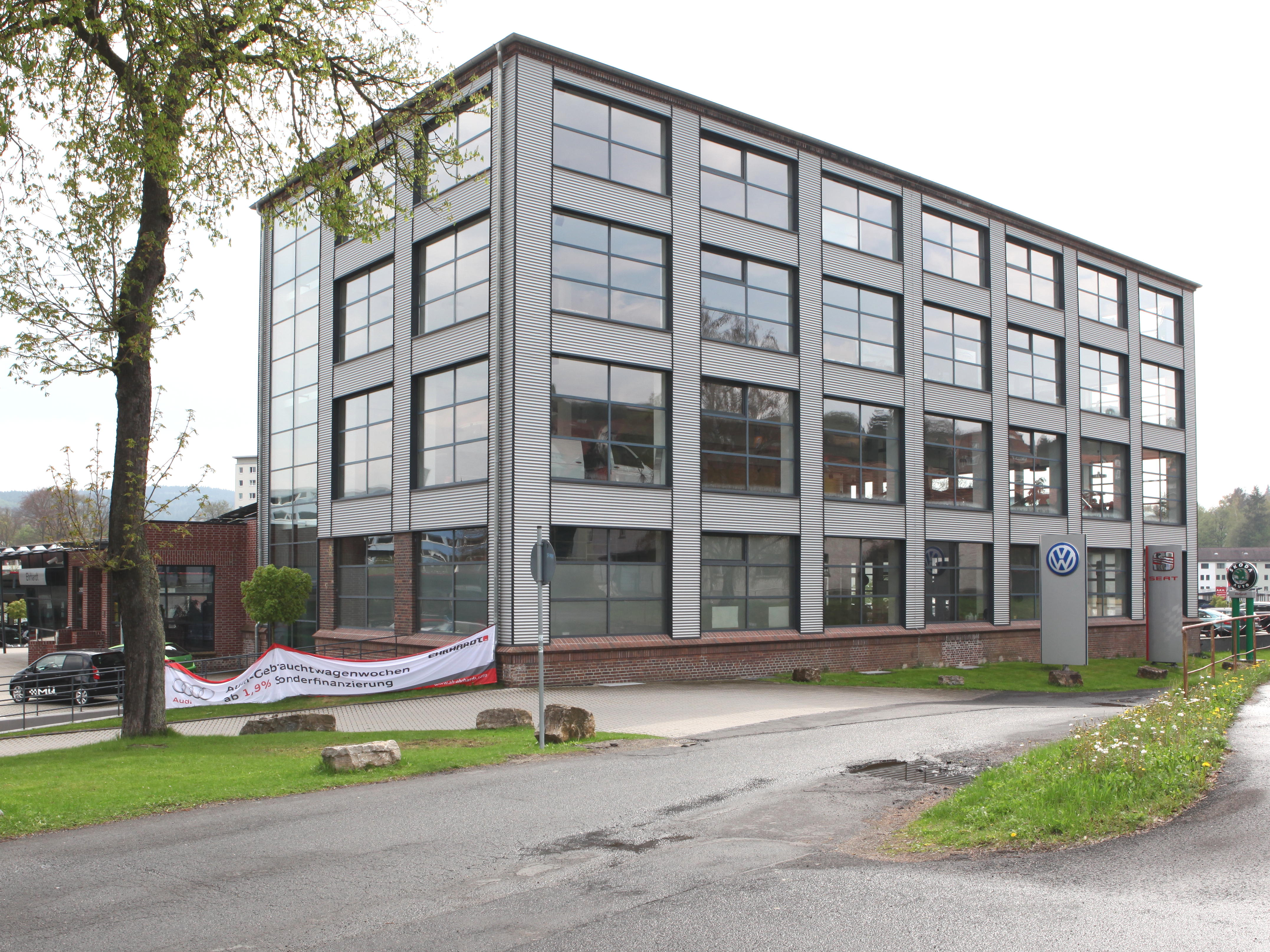
Karabinerbau, 1937, Suhl

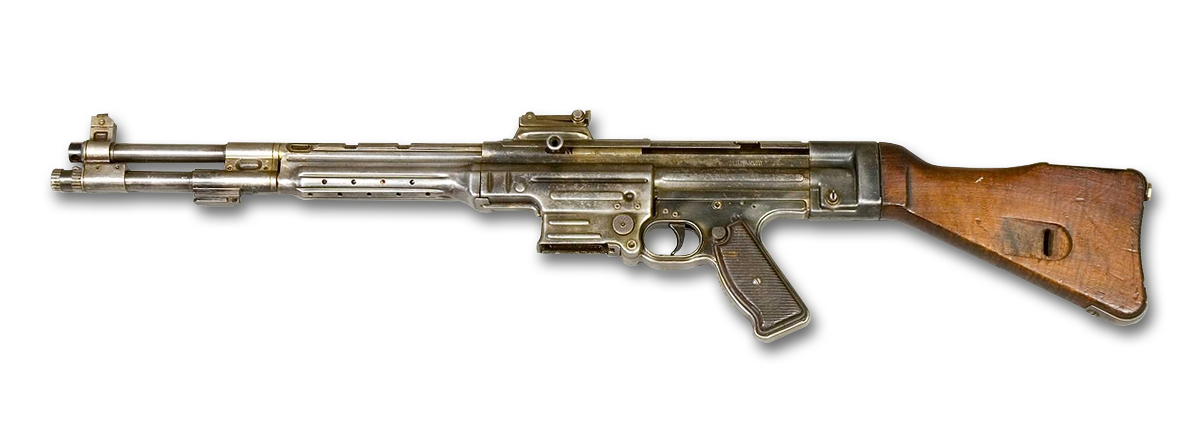
MKb 42H (Haenel), front gas port

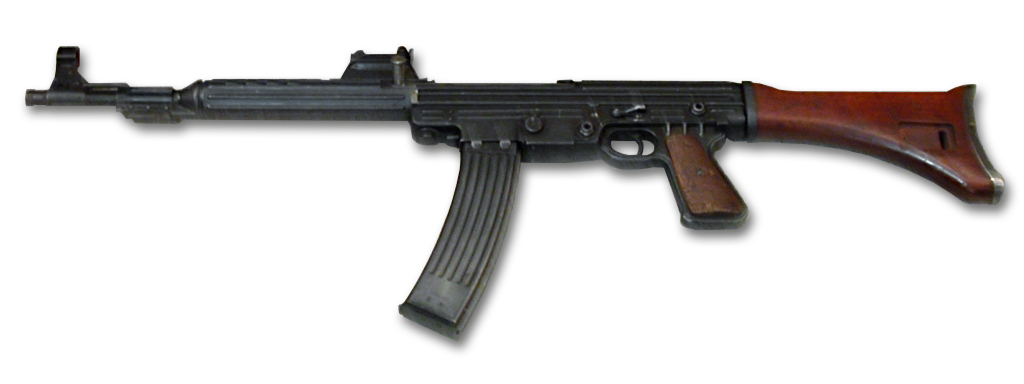
MKb 42W (Walther) rifle

In 1937 the Sauer 'Karabinerbau' is erected in Suhl. By 1938 about 1,450 employees are working for the company. With beginning of World War 2 Sauer & Sohn is manufacturing more military firearms again, after 1941 production serves the war effort almost exclusively. Next to Mauser the company 'Sauer & Sohn' became one of the most important manufacturers of the German standard rifle, the Karabiner 98k. Among the better known is the M30 Luftwaffe drilling, a survival gun for air crews. Meanwhile, the 'Maschinenkarabiner 42' (MKb 42) is developed by C. G. Haenel in the Suhl, and a competing model by Walther. It will become the 'Maschinenpistole 43' (MP 43) and later the Sturmgewehr 44 This weapon is manufactured in numbers by Sauer and other companies. Production will continue after the war for newly formed armed forces, e.g. the Volkspolizei of East Germany (DDR or GDR).

==== Sauer Modell 38H Pistol ====
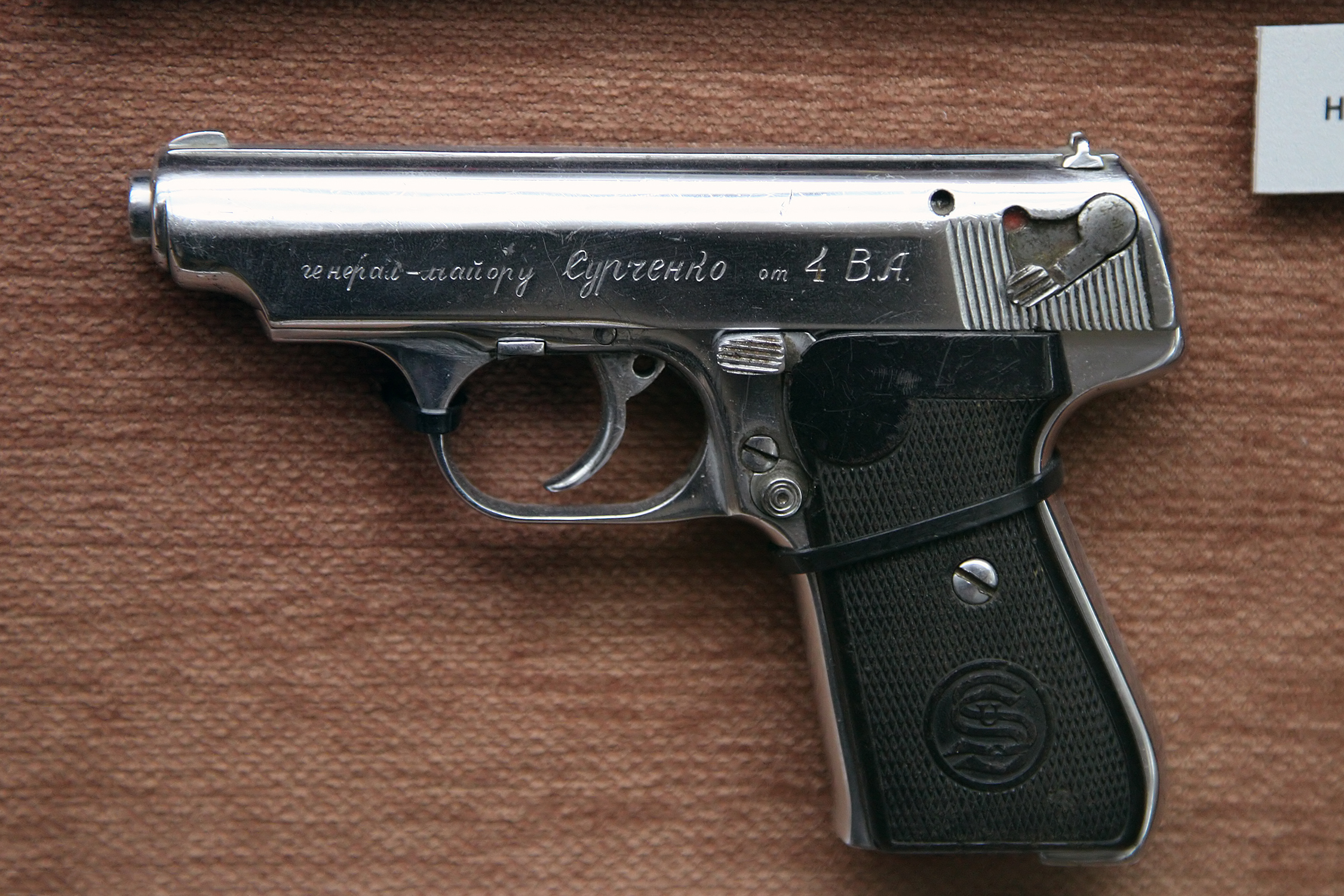
Modell 38H, Smolensk War Museum.

Of particular note is the company's Sauer 38H, the first mass-produced semi-automatic pistol to feature a cocking/de-cocking lever. It was a very advanced pocket pistol design made in .25 ACP, .32 ACP, and .380 ACP. It was adopted as German alternate standard as 'Modell 38' and was widely used by air and tank forces. Full length is 158.75mm, barrel length is 84 2/3mm, mass is 737.088g with a magazine capacity of eight. The action has a cocker/de-cocker lever that can control the concealed hammer. The handgun has a re-strike capability should the round in the chamber fail to fire on the first trigger pull.

=== After World War II ===
At the end of World War II, the original Sauer company is located in what will become East Germany (GDR). In April 1945 the U.S. Army arrives in Suhl, in early July the area is ceded to the Soviet Red Army. The company assets were seized without compensation end of October. This was confirmed by the German Communists in 1948, Rolf-Dietrich Sauer moving to West Germany (later FRG). Hans Sauer is deported by the Soviet occupational government and never heard from again, he probably died in 1946. The machinery, as happened with most of the industrial companies that had been located in the Soviet Occupation Zone, was mostly dismantled and moved east. From 1946 to 1948, formerly independent companies in East Germany, or what was left of them, were restructured and finally merged into industrial conglomerates.

In Suhl the original J. P. Sauer und Sohn company (now renamed to VEB Fortuna), along with other former weapons manufacturers like Greifelt & Compagnie and Gebrüder Merkel, were merged into a group called VVB MEWA Suhl (MEWA short for 'Metallwaren' - metalwares, metal products), at first producing small machinery (e.g. typewriters and sewing machines) for the civilian market.

==== Nationalisation in East Germany ====
The former company C. G. Haenel (which had been renamed to VEB Ernst-Thälmann-Werk Suhl) is starting production again in 1948, by 1954 the Fortuna (ex Sauer & Sohn) and 'Merkel' plant parts were attached to the 'Thälmann Works' as 'Produktionsbereiche' (PB, production areas). Now hunting weapons, later also small calibre and sporting firearms and airguns are being manufactured again. The firm Simson & Co. (renamed VEB Fahrzeug und Gerätewerk Simson Suhl), first producing bicycles, then mopeds, motorbikes and also firearms, is included in the group. The weapons manufacturing is taken over by the 'Thälmann Works', until all companies mentioned are finally merged into the VEB Fahrzeug- und Jagdwaffenwerk "Ernst Thälmann" in 1968.

The well-known trademarks were also still being used by the GDR to sell products abroad until 1970. With all the companies being united, use of the trade names 'Sauer und Sohn (Suhl)', 'Fortuna (Suhl)', 'C. G. Haenel (Suhl)', 'Gebr. Merkel (Suhl)', and 'Simson (Suhl)' (the latter only for weapons, not vehicles) were dropped.

After the dissolution of the Soviet Union and other Communist regimes in the Revolutions of 1989 former East German companies like Simson & Co. continued to manufacture products separately again, with changing ownerships, sometimes well into the 2000s.

==== Sauer & Sohn in West Germany ====
In 1951, Rolf-Dietrich Sauer sold the rights of the name and trademark and formed a new enterprise with a partner in the FGR. First in Düsseldorf, and in 1952 the company was reestablished in Eckernförde, Schleswig-Holstein as J. P. Sauer & Sohn. Experienced workers from Suhl had joined, and the production of hunting firearms, and later pistols, was begun the same year. Export markets were a.o. Scandinavia and the US, Brasil and Pakistan. The company grew bigger soon, and employed over 400 people by the mid-1960s. In 1966 the Kompressorenfabrik Wilhelm Poppe in Kiel took over 'J. P. Sauer & Sohn'. In 1968 'Wilhelm Poppe' merged with other companies into J. P. Sauer & Sohn Maschinenbau GmbH, mechanical engineering becoming a main branch of business. An independent company Sauer Getriebe KG is established in 1969 in Neumünster.

In 1972 Rolf-Dietrich Sauer died. In 1975 'Sauer Getriebe' took over plants in Aachen and Kiel from 'Sauer Maschinenbau', and in 1976 the 'J. P. Sauer & Sohn Maschinenbau' sold their hunting arms business in Eckernförde to the Schweizerische Industrie Gesellschaft (SIG), a company which had developed firearms from the 1860s onwards.

=== Sauer as Part of SIG ===
Swiss law of neutrality limits the ability of firearms manufacturers to export. Companies which wish to do so may by using a foreign partner. These restrictions prevented 'SIG' from exploiting a new design concept they had developed. The design resulted from the creation at that time of a new form of industrial production equipment, known as the "Automatic Screw Machine", which was introduced by the company. While 'SIG' had produced a very high quality handgun in their P210 model, it was also expensive to manufacture, required machining operations at high levels of precision. This produced a firearm that was known for its accuracy, but too expensive to be sold to a wider market.

Spurred by the necessity to partner with a foreign company in order to profit from their production machinery and the items it could produce 'SIG' chose the German firm of 'J. P. Sauer & Sohn'. In joining they also combined their expertise in firearms design. As a result, the SIG Sauer GmbH (Eckernförde) as small arms business was founded, the SAN SIG Arms AG (Neuhausen) as manufacturer being kept (later renamed to Swiss Arms AG), and the SIG Sauer branch and brand name created. The declared goal was to expand market share and to be of international relevance in the small arms industry. In 1985 the company SIGARMS, Inc. was established (in Virginia), to import and distribute firearms into the US market (later renamed to SIG Sauer, Inc.).

- 1971 — 'SIG' purchased sporting arms manufacturer Hämmerli based in Lenzburg, Switzerland.
- 1975/76 — 'SIG' forms partnership with hunting arms manufacturer 'J. P. Sauer & Sohn' (Eckernförde) to expand their arms division.
- 1997 — German Blaser Jagdwaffen (Isny) and 'SIGARMS' merge. Blaser, now part of 'SIG', continues autonomously developing and producing.
- 1999 — The Rheinmetall AG sells civilian market part of 'Mauser' to Blaser/'SIG', it becomes Mauser Jagdwaffen GmbH. The part owned by 'Rheinmetall' is named 'Mauser-Werke Oberndorf Waffensysteme GmbH'.

==== The first SIG Sauer handgun ====
To satisfy the needs of Swiss military and police, a new handgun model was created by the SIG Sauer GmbH, which incorporated some features from the 'SIG P210' and 'Sauer Modell 38H', simplified for more efficient cost of construction on the new 'SIG' developed machinery. Result was a new type of action for a locked-breech semi-automatic pistol, with a new high quality smooth operating double/single-action trigger, a safe hammer lowering device, automatic firing pin block, and easy disassembly for cleaning. This new concept handgun was named SIG Sauer P220.

Prior to World War II, Sauer had been primarily a maker of shotguns and hunting rifles. During the war they produced a new handgun, the Sauer 38H, but afterwards withdraw from this market. The 'Sauer 38H' had been produced in competition with other German makers, such as 'Mauser' and 'Walther', at a time when new designs began to feature a double/single-action trigger. With 'SIG' as their partner/owner, 'Sauer' returned to the business of manufacturing handguns. In 1975 the SIG Sauer line of handguns began with the SIG P220. The double-action trigger mechanism combined with advanced safety features, including the hammer lowering decocking lever, were contributed by 'Sauer' to the new P220 design.

==== Some Arms by SAN SIG Arms and SIG Sauer ====
- 1957 — The SIG SG 510 Swiss battle rifle or Stgw 57, produced to 1983. With ventilated barrel jacket, and roller-delayed blowback, as used on Spanish CETME Model 58 and German H&K G3 rifles.
- 1950s-60s — The SIG 710, general purpose machine gun design based on German MG 42, offered in different calibres.
- 1977 — The SIG P220 handgun for Swiss military and police, to replace the 'P210'. Design based on a simplified Petter-Browning system, actually the very first 'SIG Sauer System'.
- 1977 — The Browning BDA, modified 'SIG P220' design produced for 'Browning Arms' company. On right side of the slide are the words "SIG Sauer System". The first 'SIG Sauer P220' type sold in US.
- 1980 — When 'BDA' sales ceased the 'P220' was sold in its own form, and spawned a huge line of models.
- 1984 — The SIG Sauer P226 lost in the US military 'XM9' handgun procurement program, due to being underbid by Beretta by $6. Beretta was awarded a contract for the M9 pistol with the '92FS'.
- 1986 — The SIG SG 550, created for Swiss Army as Stgw 90. Over 600,000 were delivered, military production has now ceased.
- 1992 — Production of the SIG Sauer P229 begins with 'SIG Sauer' and 'SIGARMS' both in Europe and America.
- 1999 — The SIG Pro pistol series by 'SIGARMS', also offered in Europe (adopted e.g. by French police).

==== Developments in the US ====
- 1985 — SIGARMS imports SIG Sauer line of pistols, notably P220 and P230, in 1987 the P225, P226, P228.
- 1990 — SIGARMS moves to Exeter, New Hampshire, where production facilities had been established.
- 1992 — SIGARMS offers SIG P229, and program of Sauer rifles, Hämmerli target pistols and rifles.
- 1998 — SIGARMS brings in the first shotguns designed for them by B. Rizzini of Italy.
- 1999 — SIGARMS offers SIG Pro, begins 'Blaser' product distribution, e.g. Blaser R93 rifle line.

=== Sauer in the new millennium ===
The "SIG" group originally operated diverse divisions, from packaging (first 1906) to railway cars, streetcars and bogies (from 1853), automobiles (first 1921, last 1953) to arms development and manufacturing (from 1860). Their railway tech division was sold in 1995 to Fiat Ferroviaria, and the automation solutions and arms branches in 2000. Packaging technology is SIG's main business activity today.

In the late 1990s the Swiss arms industry as a whole faced a period of thorough restructuring. In the autumn of 2000 the firearms divisions of "SIG", including their arms brand SIG Sauer, were sold to the Lüke & Ortmeier Gruppe. For some time renowned names like "Hämmerli", "J. P. Sauer & Sohn", "Blaser", "Mauser Jagdwaffen", and "Kettner International GmbH" (hunting, shooting, outdoors accessories) were consolidated under one roof by the "Lüke & Ortmeier" holding.

The parts "Lüke & Ortmeier" took over in 2000 from "SIG" included:

- "SAN SIG Arms" (Neuhausen), renamed Swiss Arms AG, and the SIG Sauer brand.
- "SIG Sauer" and Sauer & Sohn (Eckernförde), "Hämmerli" (Lenzburg), and "SIGARMS, Inc.".
- "Mauser Jagdwaffen" brand and "Blaser Jagdwaffen", both remained in operation.

In 2000, SIGARMS separated from "SIG Sauer GmbH" in Germany, both produced pistols.

In 2001, SIGARMS expanded with contracts in law-enforcement market and new products for the civilian market.

In 2007, former "SIGARMS, Inc.", renamed SIG Sauer, Inc., invests in manufacturing facilities and equipment.

In 2006, "Hämmerli" becomes part of "Carl Walther" (Ulm), also brand of Umarex (Arnsberg) (acquired "Walther" in 1993). Rest of "Kettner" trading company with rich tradition is sold.

In 2000–2008, production of "J. P. Sauer & Sohn", "Mauser Jagdwaffen" is relocated to "Blaser", Isny im Allgäu.

== J. P. Sauer & Sohn firearms ==
Sauer & Sohn manufactured both handguns and long arms, including revolvers, semi-automatic pistols, rifles, and shotguns.

The "J. P. Sauer & Sohn GmbH" manufactured a series of Weatherby Mark V rifles (1958 – early 1970s).

Double rifles:

- Sauer & Sohn Double Rifle, Cape Gun (discontinued)

Firearms lately and currently produced by J. P. Sauer & Sohn German, as listed on their website:

Bolt-action rifles, entry level:

- Sauer 90 (discontinued in 2008)
- Sauer 100
  - S 100 Classic
  - S 100 Classic XT
  - S 100 Stainless XTA
  - S 100 Fieldshoot

Bolt-action rifles, mid-range:

- Sauer 101
  - S 101 Classic
  - S 101 Classic XT
  - S 101 Classic XTA
  - S 101 Highland XTC
  - S 101 GTI
  - S 101 Select
  - S 101 Artemis
- Sauer 202 (discontinued in 2015)

Bolt-action rifles, upper-range:

- Sauer 404
  - S 404 Classic
  - S 404 Classic XT
  - S 404 Synchro XT
  - S 404 Synchro XTC
  - S 404 Synchro XTC Camo
  - S 404 Silence TI
  - S 404 Select "Stutzen"
  - S 404 Artemis
  - S 404 Elegance (discontinued)
  - S 404 Select (discontinued)

Semi-automatic rifles:

- Sauer 303
  - S 303 Classic XT
  - S 303 Synchro XT
  - S 303 Select
  - S 303 Artemis
  - S 303 Classic (discontinued)
  - S 303 Hybrid (discontinued)
  - S 303 Elegance (discontinued)
  - S 303 Hardwood (discontinued)
  - S 303 Black Velvet (discontinued)
  - S 303 Forest XT (discontinued)
  - S 303 GTI (discontinued)

Shotguns, over/under:

- Sauer Apollon
- Sauer Artemis

Shotguns, side-by-side:

- Sauer & Sohn Meisterwerk Sidelock
- Sauer & Sohn Elegance Sidelock (discontinued)
- Sauer & Sohn Magma Sidelock (discontinued)
- Sauer & Sohn Model IX (discontinued)

Semi-automatic shotguns:

- Sauer SL5 Selbstladeflinte (introduced in 2017)

=== Other products ===
The "J. P. Sauer & Sohn Maschinenbau GmbH" (independent after 1975) produces high-pressure air and gas compressors.

The following bolt-action rifle is marketed by SIG Sauer GmbH, as listed on their German website:

- Sauer 200 TR (Target Rifle, discontinued)
- Sauer 200 STR (Scandinavian Target Rifle; variants Recruit, Match Junior, Match)

Chamberings offered are .22 Long Rifle (calibre-changing system), 6mm Norma BR, 6.5×55mm Swedish, .308 Winchester, as single shot or with 5-round magazines.

=== Ammunition ===
In the late 19th century and early 20th century, Sauer & Sohn produced a number of now rare rimmed sporting cartridges, ranging from 6.5x48R Sauer to 10x50R Sauer. The 6.5x48R and 8x48R Sauer are based on the .360 No. 2 Nitro Express.

== See also ==
- M30 Luftwaffe drilling
- SIG Sauer
- Swiss Arms AG
