= Sauer 38H =

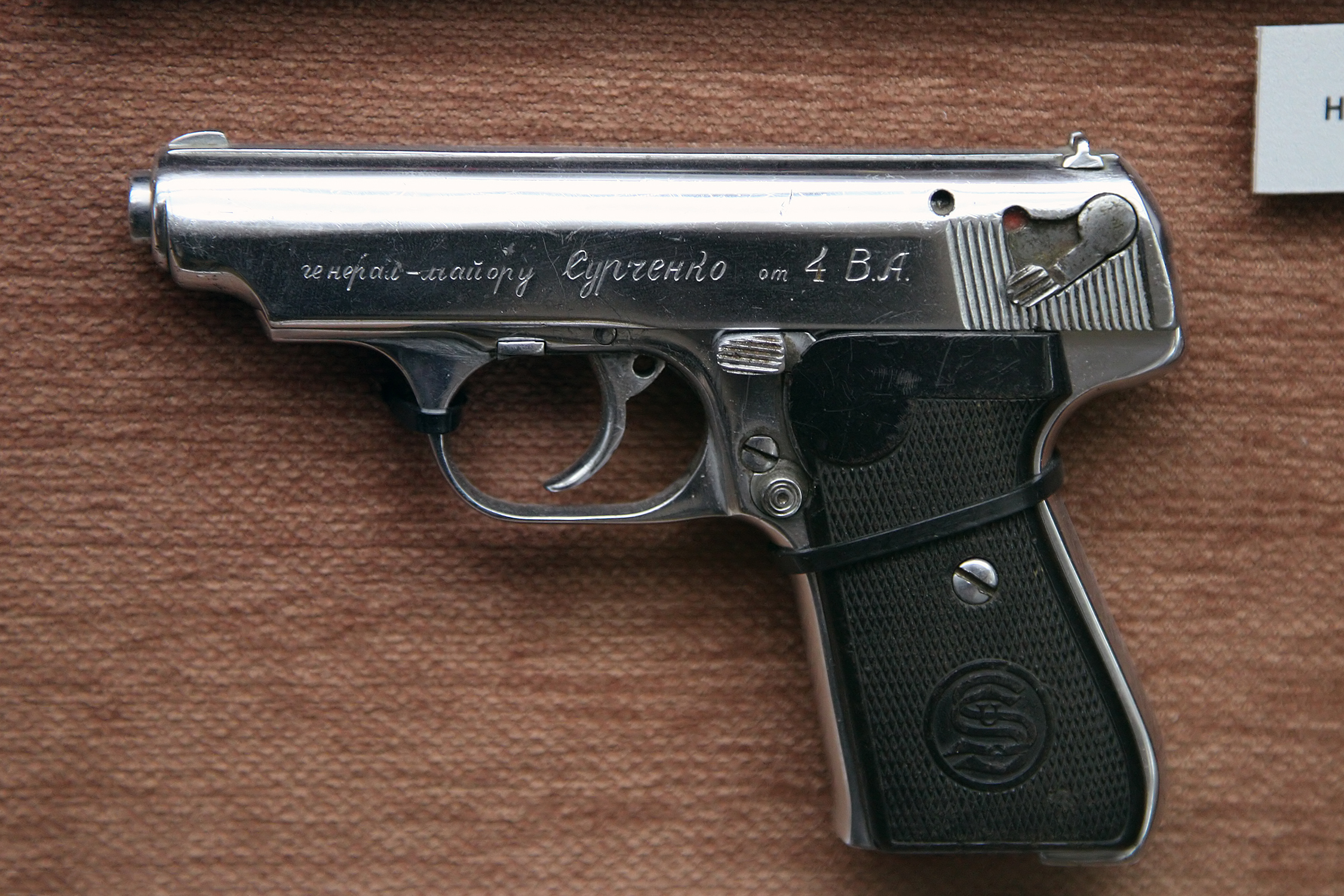
- Sauer 38H (second version)
- Type: Semi-automatic pistol
- Place of origin: Nazi Germany

Service history
- In service: 1939–45
- Used by: Nazi Germany; People's Movement for the Liberation of Azawad
- Wars: World War II; Tuareg rebellion (1990–1995)

Production history
- Designer: J. P. Sauer & Sohn
- Designed: 1938
- Manufacturer: J. P. Sauer & Sohn
- Produced: 1938–1945
- No. built: ~200,000

Specifications
- Mass: 715 g (1 lb 9 oz)
- Length: 161 mm (6.3 in)
- Barrel length: 86 mm (3.4 in)
- Cartridge: .32 ACP (7.65×17mmSR Browning), .22 Long Rifle, .380 ACP
- Action: Straight blowback
- Muzzle velocity: 280 m/s (920 ft/s) with 7.65×17mm
- Effective firing range: 25 metres (27 yd)
- Feed system: 8-round detachable box magazine
- Sights: Fixed iron sights, front—blade, rear—notch

The Sauer 38H or often just H was a small semi-automatic pistol made in Nazi Germany from 1938 until just after the end of World War II in Europe by J. P. Sauer & Sohn, then based in Suhl, Germany. The "H" in the model number is short for "hahn", referring to the internal hammer of the firing mechanism.

== Development ==
Sauer developed the model 38H from their earlier semi-automatic handguns. It was necessary to compete with companies such as Mauser and Walther in the commercial market. However, with the outbreak of the war, most pistols went to various German police agencies. These pistols were stamped by those agencies and some can still be found with the holster and additional magazine with which they were distributed. Sauer 38H pistols presented to Nazi officials often featured custom engraving, ivory grips, and often gold inlay as well. For example, in September 2004, the Rock Island Auction Company sold a Sauer 38H, serial number 363573, that belonged to Sepp Dietrich for $43,125.00.

The Sauer 38H was produced in three basic models. Generally, the slide of the first model says "JP Sauer und Sohn" on the left. The second version says only "CAL 7.65", and the third version omits the safety and the cocking/decocking lever. Towards the end of the war, weapons produced were simplified for quicker, cheaper production. For the 38H, this meant simpler markings, rough finish, and the elimination of features like the slide-mounted safety. Much more rarely, some late production examples retained the safety but omitted the cocking/decocking lever. So-called "late-war" models were still fully functional, though final examples produced until April 1945 when the factory was overrun by the Allies, feature mismatched serial numbers and poor fit and finish.

The concept of the Sauer 38H persists in the SIG Sauer P232 and its predecessor the P230, which also feature a fixed barrel, decocking lever, and similar internal design. As a testament to their fine design, many Sauer 38Hs are regularly used by owners to this day, albeit usually with replacement grips.

== Design details ==
The "H" in the model number indicates this pistol uses a shrouded hammer as opposed to striker style firing of earlier Sauer models. Other features included a traditional double-action trigger, single-column magazine and a recoil spring surrounding a fixed barrel.

A revolutionary feature was the use of a lever that either cocked or decocked (dropped the hammer) safely. This is the first handgun to have this type device (located on the left side below the slide, just forward of the grip). The hammer on the Sauer 38H could be lowered for safe carry at any time. The cocking feature was necessary due to the shrouded hammer and the decocking mechanism was a safety feature. A hollow space on the trigger indicated if the concealed hammer was cocked; if completely exposed, the hammer was lowered. A small pin protruded at the rear of the slide as a loaded chamber indicator.

Another advanced feature for its time was the magazine safety, a device that deactivates the trigger when the magazine is removed from the pistol. Almost all modern pistols manufactured by SIG Sauer today feature a decocking lever, including the highly successful SIG Sauer P226 family. Most modern SIG Sauer pistols feature controls in almost the same place as on the Sauer 38H, though as these modern designs have exposed hammers the cocking feature is omitted from the lever. The Heckler & Koch P9 also utilizes a cocking/decocking lever based on the Sauer 38H.

The grips of the pistol were constructed of Bakelite. Age often results in the cracking and crumbling of the grips on surviving examples. All original grips featured "SUS" lettering standing for "Sauer und Sohn" which could be found on the same side of the pistol as the magazine release though many reproduction grips have copied this logo. It is unusual for a present-day example to have original, undamaged grips.

The Sauer 38H was overwhelmingly produced for the .32 ACP cartridge. The model 38H was used by German armed forces such as the Luftwaffe, as well as police forces in numbers nearly equal to the Walther PPK. The Sauer 38H was produced for military, police, and the commercial market. A very small amount were made in .22 Long Rifle and .380 ACP.
