= TG-1 =

Rifle

The Swiss Arms TG-1 is a break-action pellet rifle. The main intended use is target shooting and very small game and varmint hunting. The weapon has a rifled barrel and polymer stock and body. The safety toggle is in front of the trigger and allows for quick firing from safety if needed.
