= Kettner =

Kettner (Czech feminine: Kettnerová) is a surname of German origin. It means 'chain maker', but there is a theory that the surname could be a Czechization of other German words – Kötner (i.e. 'cottager', 'small field owner'), or from Gärtner ('gardener'). Another theory suggests that the surname could refer to someone from a place called Ketten or Garten. Notable people with the surname include:

- Johanna Sophia Kettner (1722–1802), German soldier
- Marie Kettnerová (1911–1998), Czech table tennis player
- Michelle Kettner (born 1973), Australian weightlifter
- Nils Kettner (1898–1967), Swedish equestrian
- Steve Kettner (born 1969), Australian weightlifter
- William Kettner (1864–1930), American Democratic politician
- Zdeněk Kettner (born 1974), Czech teacher, politician and MP

== See also ==
- Bill Kettner (fireboat), San Diego, California's first fireboat
- Hughes & Kettner, German manufacturer of instrument amplifiers, cabinets and effects boxes
