= SIG Sauer 1911 =

Sig Sauer 1911
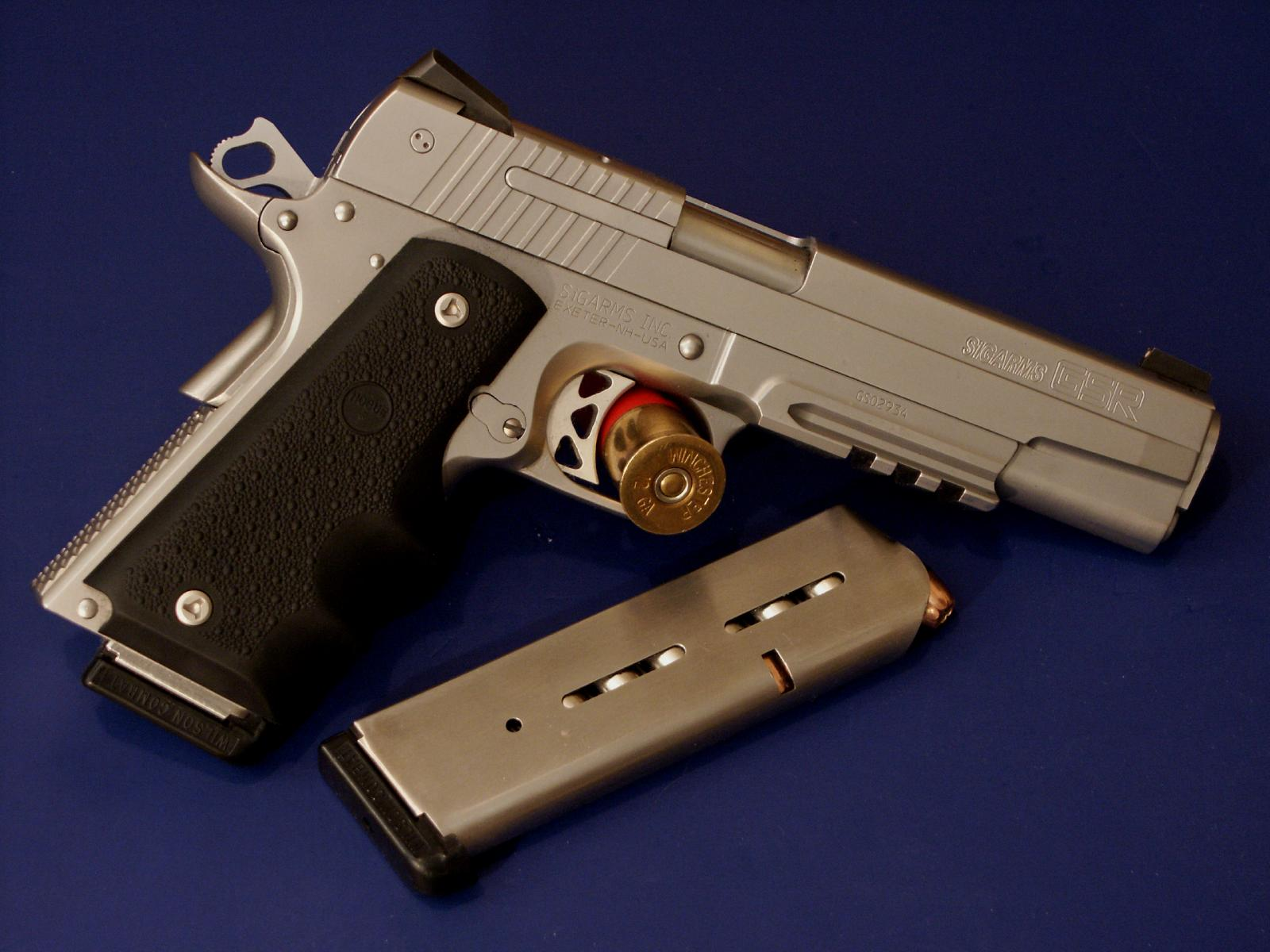
- Type: Semi-automatic pistol
- Place of origin: United States

Production history
- Manufacturer: SIG Sauer, Inc., Newington, New Hampshire, U.S.
- Produced: 2004–present

Specifications
- Barrel length: Standard model: 5"; Carry model: 4.2"; Compact model: 4.2"; Sub Compact: 3.3"; Micro Compact 3.3"; Ultra Compact 2.7"
- Cartridge: 9×19mm Parabellum; 10mm Auto; .357 SIG; .380 ACP; .45 ACP
- Feed system: 8-round standard detachable box magazine

SIG Sauer of Newington, New Hampshire, manufactures a full line of 1911 styled handguns. The earliest models were very faithful to the John M. Browning–designed Colt M1911 Pistol which became the United States standard sidearm and served in that capacity for some seven decades before being replaced by the Beretta M9 handgun.

== Full size models ==
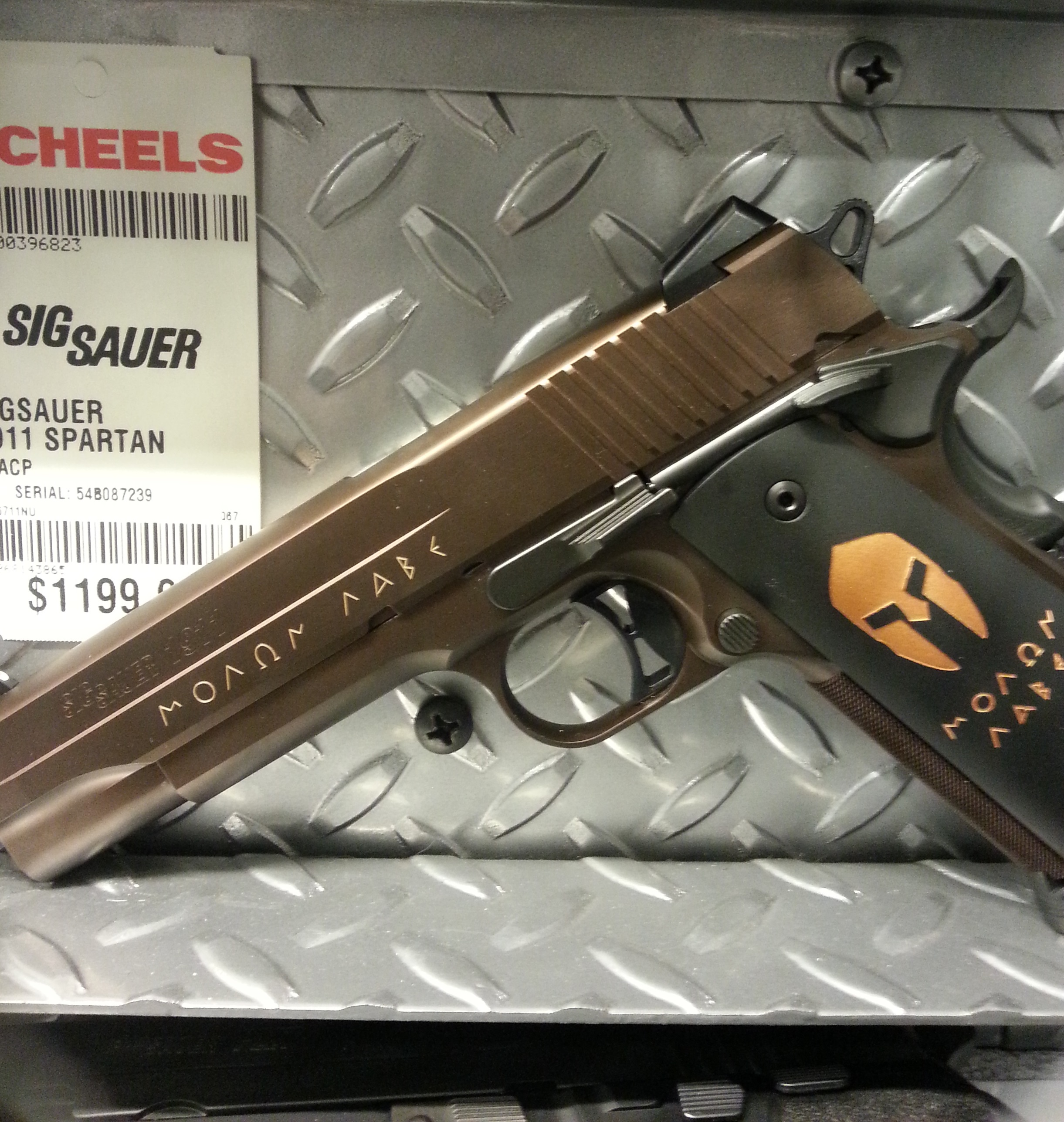
Sig Sauer 1911 Spartan

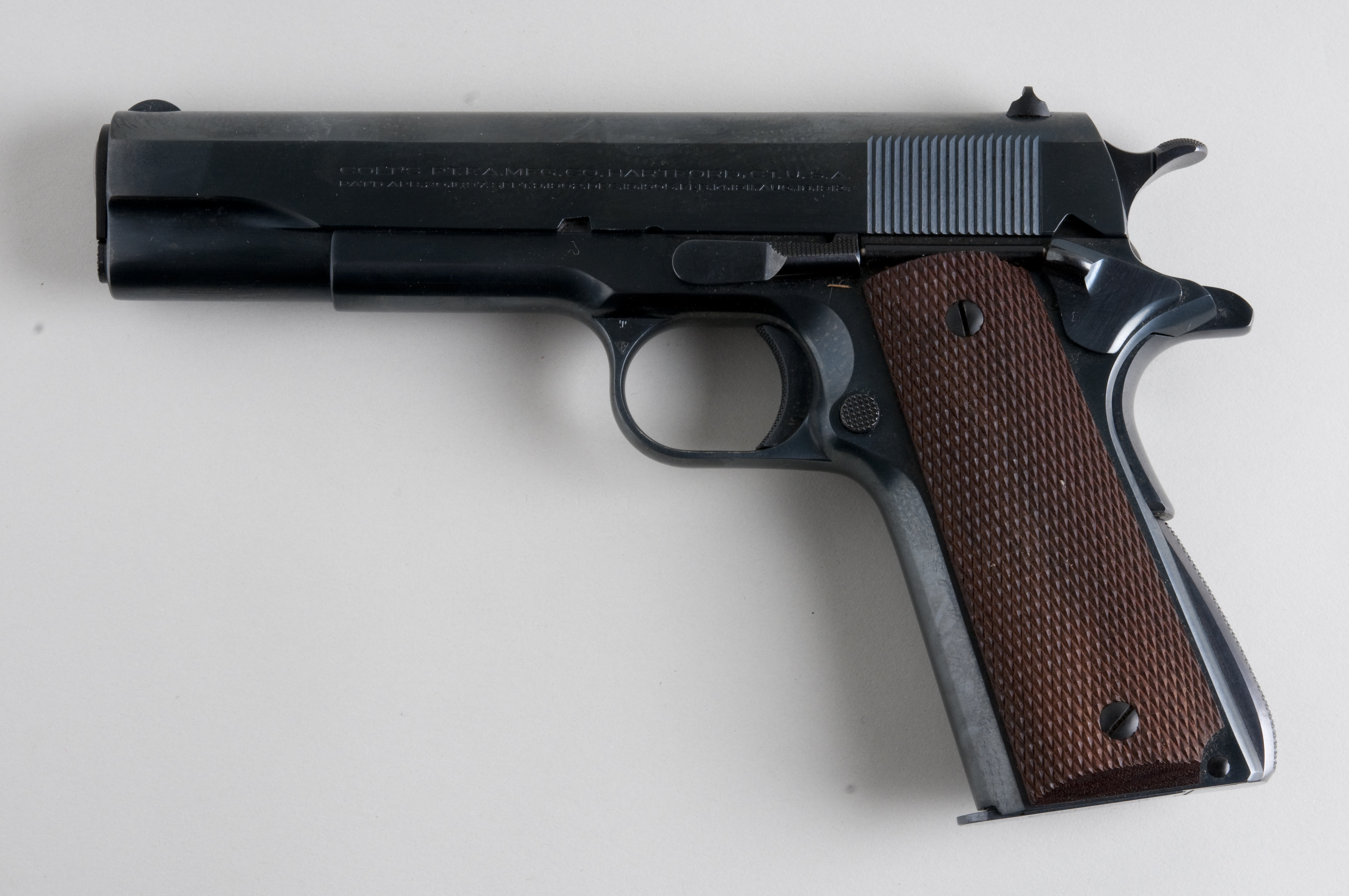
Colt M1911A1

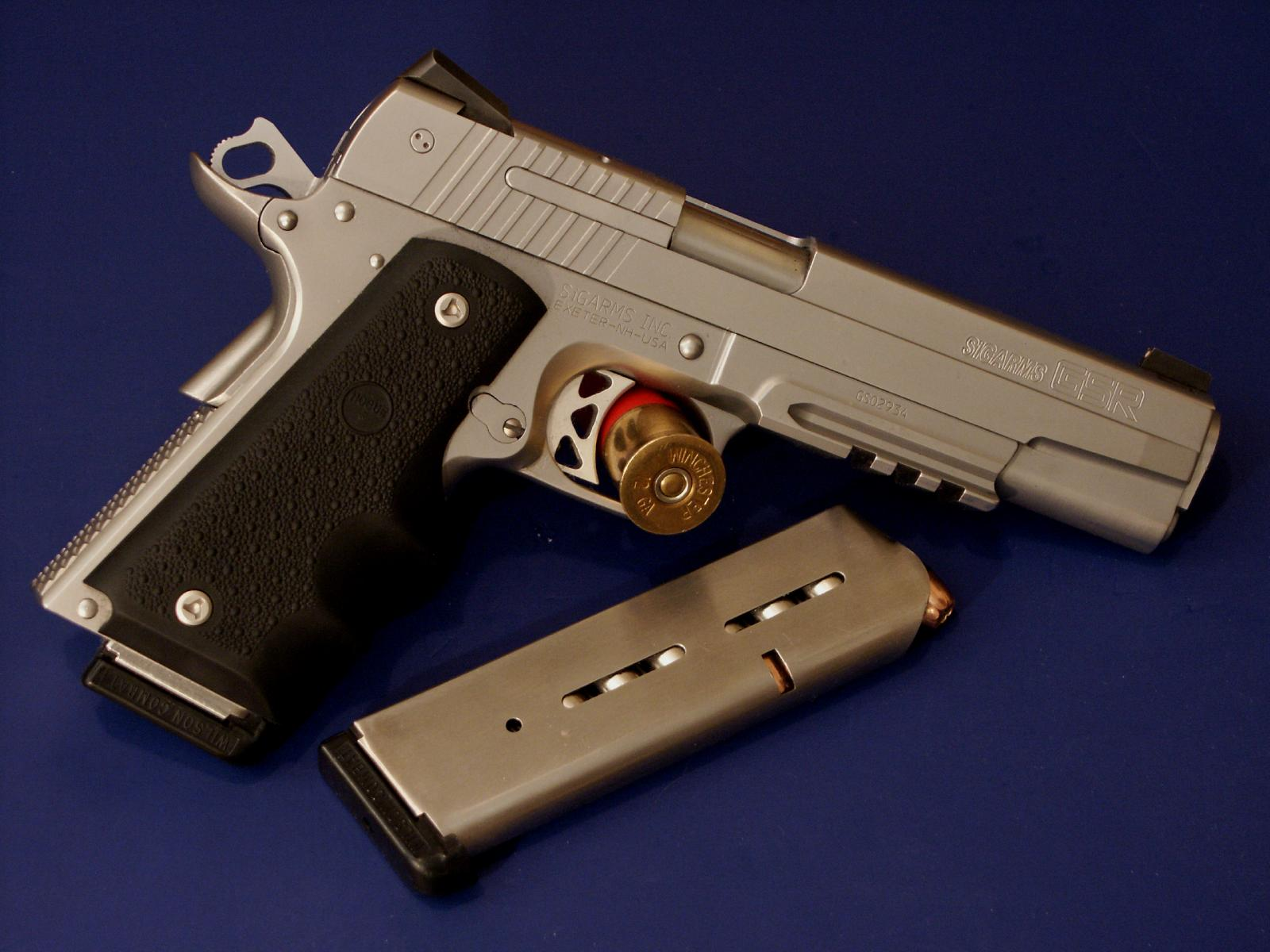
Sig Sauer 1911 GSR

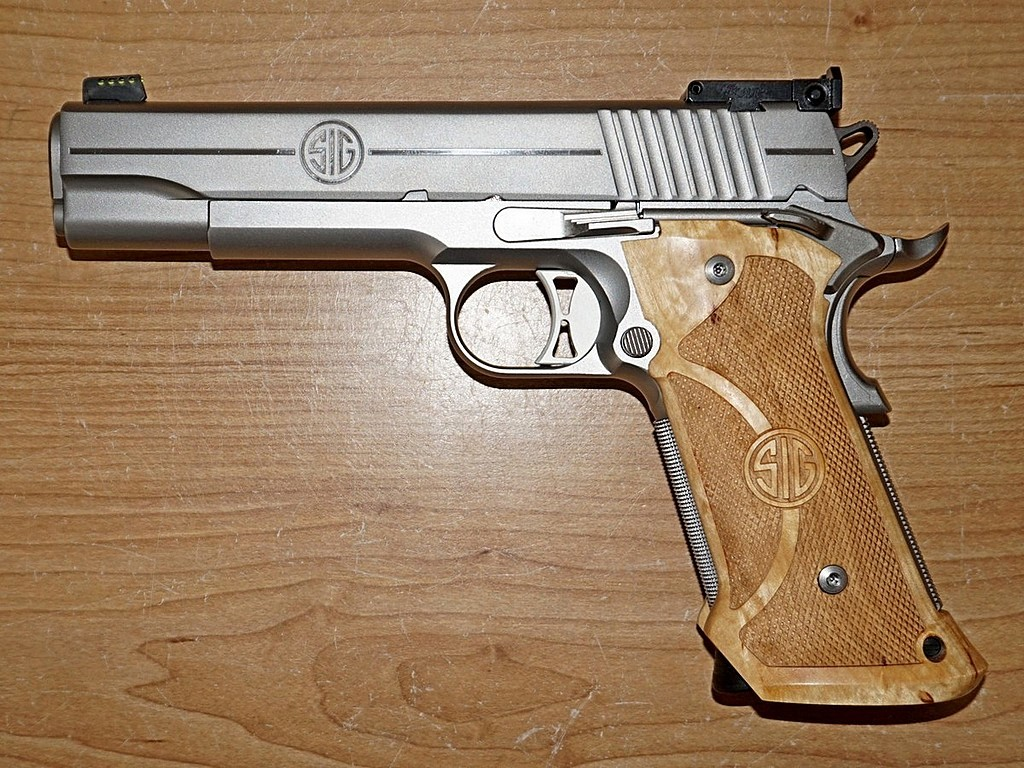
SIG Sauer 1911 Stainless Super Target

- 1911 Emperor Scorpion Full-Size
- 1911 Fastback Nightmare Full-Size
- 1911 Match Elite Stainless Full-Size
- 1911 Max Full-Size
- 1911 Nickel Rail Full-Size
- 1911 Spartan Full-Size
- 1911 Stainless
- 1911 Stainless Super Target Full-Size
- 1911 STX Full-Size
- 1911 TACOPS Full-Size Picatinny Rail, 9 x 19mm Parabellum, 10mm S&W, .45 ACP
- 1911 Target Full-Size
- 1911 We The People Full-Size
- 1911 XO Full-Size
- 1911 TSS CAB13 duo-tone stainless and black, factory installed Crimson Trace laser burlwood grips

== Design differences ==
=== Historical context ===
Due to the poor performance of the .38 Long Colt revolvers used in the Philippines during and after the Spanish–American War the US Army sought a new handgun to be chambered in a larger caliber. Tests began in 1907 and culminated in a design from John M. Browning created for the Colt Patent Firearms Manufacturing Co. designated Model 1910, but with changes made to that design. It was type accepted as the Government Model M1911.

== Early models ==
The SIG Sauer GSR ("Granite Series Rail") is a series of pistols with a stainless steel frame and slide based on the Colt M1911 Pistol. The SIG Granite Series was awarded the 2004 Handgun of the Year Award by the Shooting Industry Academy of Excellence. It is entirely made in the USA, from American parts.

Description: Chambered for the .45 ACP round, some GSR models have an accessory rail that can be used to mount a variety of different tactical lights, lasers, or just about anything that can accommodate a Picatinny rail. Standard models have a 5" barrel and 4.5-pound single-action trigger. The GSR is reported to have produced range results of a 1.5" group at 25 meters. The GSR comes in compact (3.5" barrel) and carry models (4" barrel) and has various sight options available. SIG offers choice of a stainless steel finish, a Nitron dark finish, or a two-tone Nitron and stainless look.

The TAC OPS and Scorpion versions feature a Picatinny rail, night sights, and a threaded barrel to allow the user to attach a sound suppressor.

== Users ==
- Portugal
  - Public Security Police
  - Republican National Guard
- United States
  - Boston Police Department SWAT
- Argentina
  - Policía metropolitana DOEM
