= SIG Sauer =

Swiss-German-American firearms manufacturer

SIG Sauer GmbH & Co. KG
- Type: Private
- Industry: Weaponry
- Founded: 1976; 50 years ago in Schleswig-Holstein, Germany
- Defunct: 2020; 6 years ago
- Headquarters: Eckernförde, Germany
- Area served: Worldwide
- Products: Firearms and accessories
- Parent: Lüke & Ortmeier Holding Gruppe, aka L&O Holding
- Website: sigsauer.de

Sig Sauer, Inc.
- Formerly: SIGARMS, Inc. (1985–2007)
- Type: Private
- Industry: Weaponry
- Founded: 1985; 41 years ago
- Headquarters: Newington, New Hampshire, United States
- Area served: Worldwide
- Key people: Ron Cohen (CEO and President)
- Products: Pistols, rifles, airguns, electro-optics, ammunition, suppressors, shooting accessories
- Services: Gunsmithing, training
- Number of employees: ~2,500 (2024)
- Parent: Lüke & Ortmeier Holding Gruppe, aka L&O Holding
- Website: sigsauer.com

SIG Sauer AG
- Type: Private
- Headquarters: Schaffhausen, Neuhausen am Rheinfall, Switzerland
- Products: Firearms
- Parent: Lüke & Ortmeier Holding Gruppe, aka L&O Holding
- Website: sigsauer.swiss/en

SIG Sauer ([ɛs iː ɡeː ˈzaʊ̯ɐ]) is, since the 1970s, a combined brand name of several firearms manufacturing companies, with SIG referring to Schweizerische Industrie Gesellschaft originally founded 1853, while the latter part comes from Sauer & Sohn, founded in 1751 in Germany and still active there. With Switzerland limiting the export of weapons, the partnership started with the SIG Sauer P220 in 1975.

Several sister companies design and manufacture firearms using the trade name SIG Sauer. It is also a registered brand name. The original company, Schweizerische Waggonfabrik (SWF), later Schweizerische Industrie-Gesellschaft (SIG), went through several selloffs, leaving the SIG Sauer brand spread over several companies. The original SIG is now known as SIG Group and no longer has any firearms business.

- The German company branch was SIG Sauer GmbH & Co. KG. It was formed in 1976 as a partnership between Schweizerische Industrie Gesellschaft (SIG) of Switzerland and J.P. Sauer & Sohn of Germany before going defunct in 2020.
- The Swiss company is SIG Sauer AG. Its predecessor SIG Arms AG was sold to L&O Holding in western Germany and was first renamed SAN Swiss Arms AG, commonly known as Swiss Arms, and in late 2019 was further renamed SIG Sauer AG.
- The American company is Sig Sauer, Inc (stylized as SIG SAUER). Originally established as SIGARMS, it was founded in Virginia in 1985 to import and distribute SIG Sauer firearms into the United States. Its headquarters were moved to New Hampshire in 1990. This company was renamed Sig Sauer, Inc. in 2007, and since 2000 is organizationally separate from SIG Sauer GmbH.

L&O Holding is the parent company of the Swiss SIG Sauer AG and the American Sig Sauer Inc.

== History ==
=== 1853–1863 ===
The origins of the SIG Sauer company lie in the company named Schweizerische Waggonfabrik ("Swiss Wagon Factory"), which was founded in 1853 by Friedrich Peyer im Hof (1817–1900), Heinrich Moser (1805–1874) and Johann Conrad Neher (1818–1877).

The group pooled their engineering talents and created the Prelaz-Burnand rifle, known as the "Prélaz-Burnand 1859" or "Prelaz-Burnand 1860" rifle. The invention of this rifle is credited to gunsmith Jean-Louis Joseph Prélaz and army officer Edouard Burnand. The rifle was submitted to an 1860 competition by Switzerland's Federal Ministry of Defence. It won and in 1864 the company was awarded a contract to produce 30,000 Prelaz-Burnand rifles, adopted as the M1863.

=== 1864–1975 ===
Upon receiving the 1864 government contract to produce rifles, the company name was changed to Schweizerische Industrie Gesellschaft (SIG, German for "Swiss Industrial Company"), known as Société Industrielle Suisse in French-speaking regions of Switzerland, reflecting the new emphasis on their production.

J. P. Sauer & Sohn formed part of the German armaments industry under Nazi rule, producing firearms for the Wehrmacht, Luftwaffe, and Waffen-SS during World War II. Like other private manufacturers in Nazi Germany, the company operated within a centrally directed war economy in which industrial output was subordinated to the regime’s military objectives. The Sauer 38H pistol produced by the firm was issued to German military and security forces, including units of the Waffen-SS.

Following World War II, German arms manufacturers underwent restructuring and ownership changes. The later formation of SIG Sauer in the 1970s through cooperation between Switzerland’s SIG and Germany’s J. P. Sauer & Sohn reflects this post-war industrial realignment rather than a direct institutional continuity with wartime operations. The SIG P210 pistol was developed in 1947 based on the French Modèle 1935 pistol (the Petter-Browning design was licensed). It was adopted by the Swiss military in 1949 as the "Pistole 49". This single-action semi-automatic P210 brought SIG much acclaim, due to the precision processes employed in its manufacture and its resultant accuracy and reliability. The P210 frame design incorporates external rails that fit closely with the slide, thus eliminating play in the mechanism during firing. The P210 was noted for its extreme accuracy. The Petter-Browning patent was a refinement of the Browning Hi-Power (P35), which was John Moses Browning's last design which was created for the French 1935 pistol, but not adopted.

Swiss law limits the ability of Swiss companies to export firearms. Swiss companies which wish to do this have to do so by using a foreign partner. So in the 1970s SIG purchased both Swiss Hämmerli and German J. P. Sauer and Sohn, which resulted in the formation of SIG Sauer.

=== 1976–1984 ===
SIG Sauer's line of handguns began in 1975 with the SIG Sauer SIG P220. It was initially developed by SIG and produced and distributed by J.P. Sauer & Sohn, but in 1976 SIG bought J.P. Sauer & Sohn and the resultant company was called SIG Sauer GmbH, based in Germany.

Prior to World War II, Sauer had been primarily a maker of shotguns and hunting rifles. During the war, they produced a handgun, the Sauer 38H, but afterward had withdrawn from this market. With SIG as their partner/owner, Sauer returned to the business of manufacturing handguns. Their Sauer 38H had been produced in competition with other German makers such as Mauser and Walther at a time when new designs began to feature a double/single-action trigger. This double-action trigger mechanism, combined with advanced safety features including the hammer-lowering decocking lever, was incorporated by Sauer into the new P220 design. This new P220 design was derived from the Petter-Browning design and was created in response to a Swiss military and police requirement for a handgun to replace the P210. This new P220 design should properly be called the SIG Sauer system, which was, in fact, the labeling on one of the first SIG Sauer handguns, a modified SIG Sauer P220 design produced for the Browning Arms company in 1977. On the right side of the slide are the words "SIG Sauer System". This was the first SIG Sauer P220 type sold in the US.

=== 1985–1999 ===
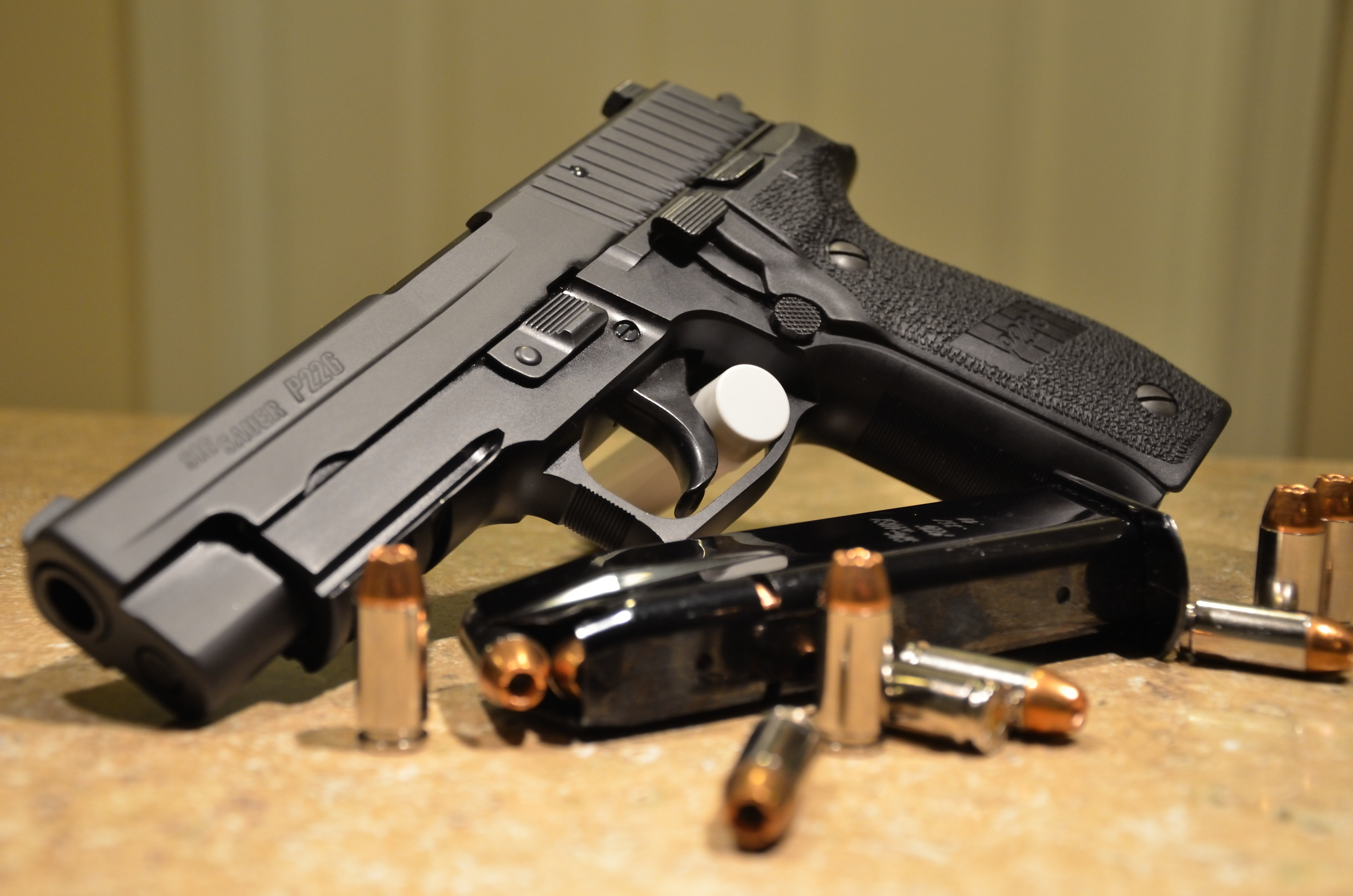
A SIG Sauer P226 semi-automatic pistol, with magazine removed

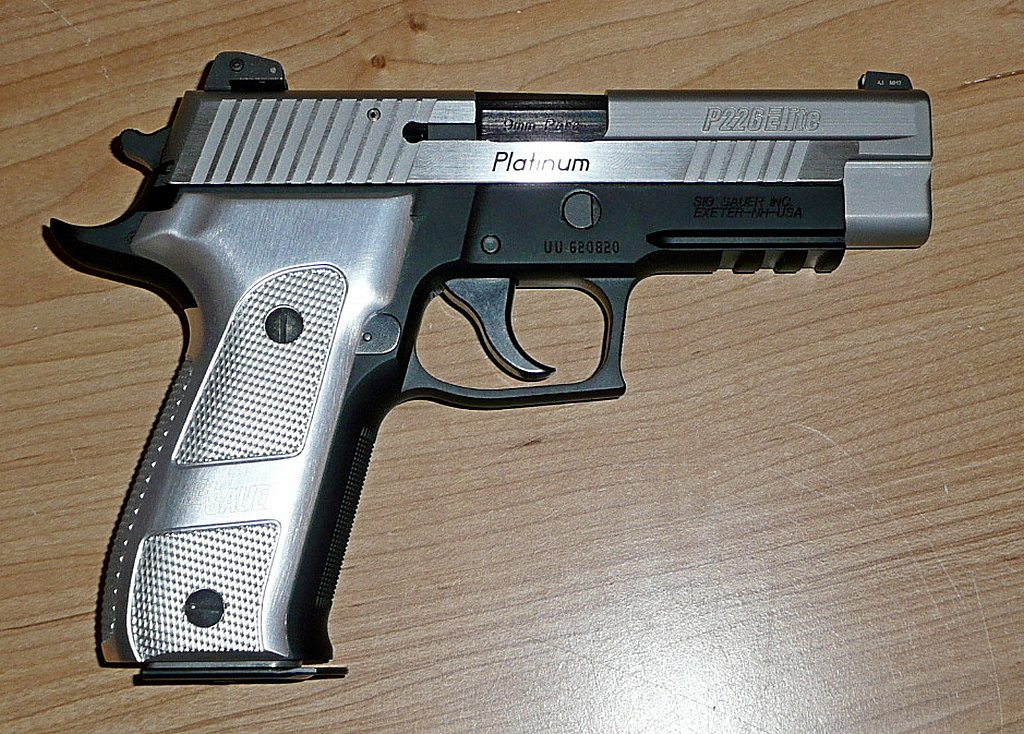
SIG Sauer P226 Elite Platinum 9mm

In January 1985, SIG established a subsidiary, SIGARMS, Inc., in Tysons, Virginia, to import the P220 and P230 models into the United States. Two years later the firm moved to a larger facility in Herndon, Virginia, and introduced models P225, P226 and P228. SIGARMS moved to Exeter, New Hampshire, in 1990 where production facilities had been established and production began on the P229 in 1992.

=== 2000s ===
SIG's firearms subsidiaries in Germany and the United States and its firearms subdivision in Switzerland were all sold to Michael Lüke and Thomas Ortmeier's L&O Holding in October 2000. Its firearms subdivision in Switzerland became a subsidiary in its own right, SAN Swiss Arms AG, more commonly known as Swiss Arms, although its products still used the SIG Sauer brand.

In 2004, according to CEO Ron Cohen, the company was near failure with just 130 employees. Cohen decided to add AR-15 style rifles to the company's product catalog, which he credits with saving the company.

In 2007, SIGARMS changed its name to Sig Sauer, Inc., sometimes called Sig Sauer USA. By 2016, it had over 1,000 employees and was selling more than 43,000 firearms a year.

=== 2010s ===
In 2014, news reports first emerged reporting arms sales by SIG to Colombia, in contravention of German weapons trafficking laws. The reporting was corroborated by whistleblowers inside the company including in New Hampshire. It was alleged that SIG had filed false export paperwork with the German government for nearly 38,000 pistols. SIG claimed that the end user of the weapons was in the US when in fact they were in Colombia, a location to which weapons exports were banned by German law.

In 2015, SIG Sauer expanded to include suppressors, optics, ammo and airguns, aiming to provide a greater range of firearm and firearm safety equipment and accessories. Also in 2015 human rights campaigners in Germany brought a lawsuit against SIG for allegedly not doing enough to prevent the use of their weapons by cartel groups in Mexico.

The US military has produced a requirement for a new handgun to replace the current M9 model (Beretta 92FS). In February 2016, bids were submitted by 12 companies to compete for this contract which was expected to result in purchases of more than 500,000 pieces. On 1 July 2016, SIG Sauer was reported to be one of three remaining competitors who were in consideration for this contract. On 19 January 2017, SIG Sauer was awarded the contract for the P320.

In a press event on 25 July 2018, SIG Sauer announced that its airgun division was renamed to SIG Air, and introduced its Precision Line air rifles, starting with the ASP20 break-barrel gas piston air rifle.

On 5 November 2018, the United States Coast Guard, which has long used the .40 caliber SIG P229 as its duty sidearm, announced that it would acquire the SIG Air ProForce P229 airsoft pistol (which was then produced under brand licensing by French airsoft manufacturer CyberGun) as its new training pistol to give cadets and guardsmen the ability to practice gun handling, conduct target practice in various environments, and train in realistic force-on-force scenarios. SIG Air announced that "we are rapidly expanding the SIG AIR business, and it is important to us to assume full control to ensure all SIG Air products are of the highest quality", and they will no longer be licensing the "SIG" brand or trademarks for sale by commercial airsoft manufacturers.

In April 2018 prosecutors in Kiel, Germany, brought criminal charges against SIG and the executives who had been involved in the illegal arms trafficking of 38,000 SP2022's to Colombia. Chief Executive Ron Cohen was arrested at Frankfurt Airport.

In April 2019 Cohen and two other executives were convicted of breaking export laws. Cohen was given an 18-month suspended sentence and fined $675,000. SIG Sauer GmbH was fined $12 million by the court.

In late 2019, Swiss Arms was renamed SIG Sauer AG.

=== 2020s ===
On 4 June 2020, SIG Sauer GmbH announced it intended to close its factory at Eckernförde, Germany, by year's end, resulting in losses of about 125 jobs as well as plans to fulfill purchase orders. It blamed "locational handicaps" hindering its sales, claiming "a few other local producers" were preferred in government purchases for the German police forces and the Bundeswehr. According to SIG Sauer GmbH CEO Tim Castagne, "due to its international orientation, SIG Sauer is systematically excluded from tenders [in Germany]."

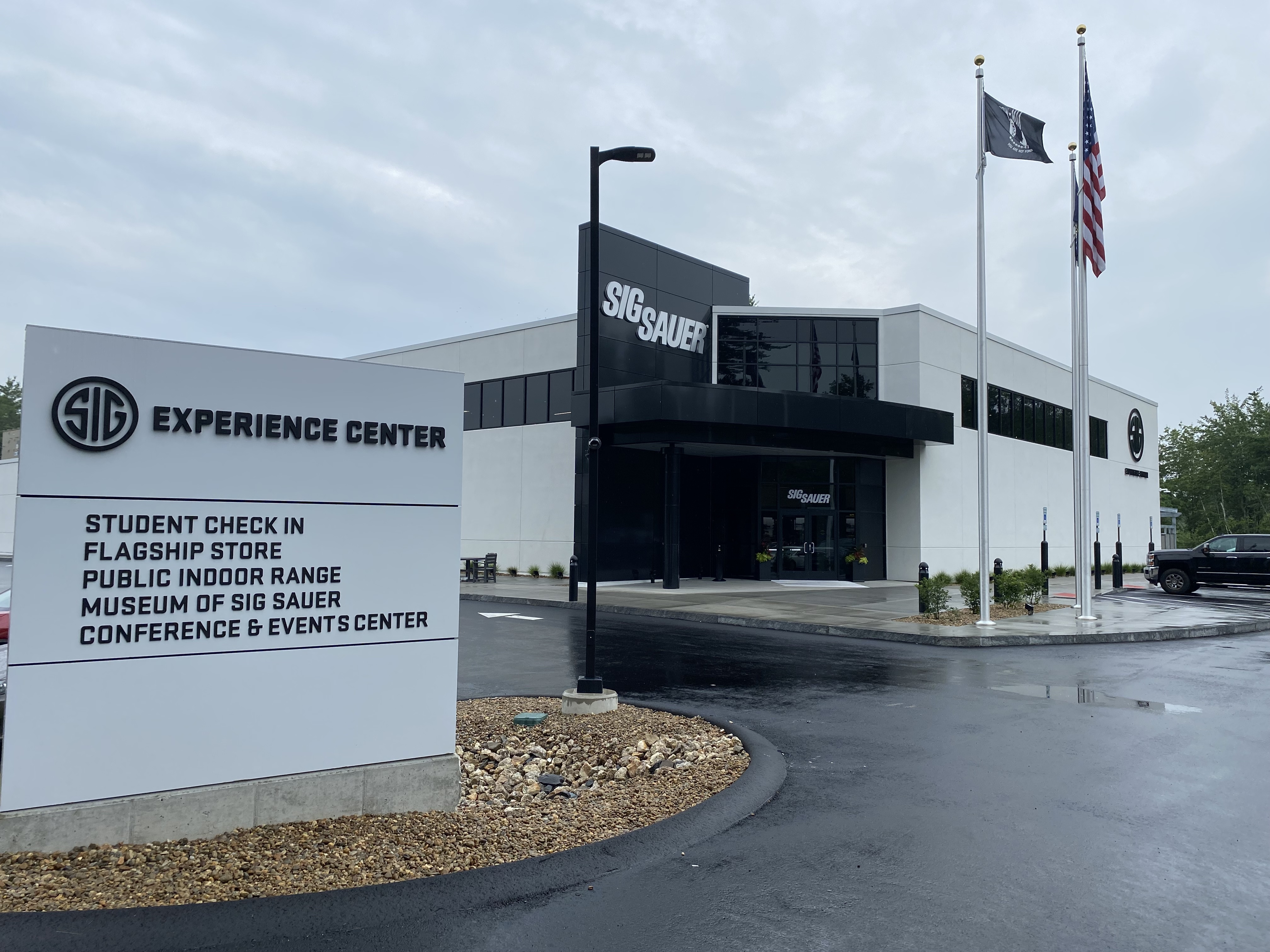
SIG Experience Center in Epping, New Hampshire

On 19 April 2022, the US Army, following a 27-month evaluation process, announced it had awarded SIG Sauer a contract for two Next Generation Squad Weapon (NGSW) variations, the M7 and M250 automatic rifle, as well as for the 6.8 common cartridge ammunition used by both rifles. The initial value of the award was $20.4 million for the delivery of the weapons, ammunition, and accessories. The M7 and M250 are planned to replace the M4 carbine and M249 light machine gun, respectively.

In July 2022, the company opened the SIG Experience Center in Epping, New Hampshire, co-located with the SIG Sauer Academy. The Experience Center includes a retail store, indoor shooting range, company museum, conference center, and corporate offices.

In 2023, a popular handgun for US law enforcement and Customs and Border Protection, the P320, came under fire for unintentional discharge of the firearm. The company said the gun is safe, and the cases were due to improper handling and a lack of gun safety standards. According to gun safety officials, the user can avoid such discharge by "keeping the finger outside the trigger guard until the decision is made to shoot".

In 2025, SIG Sauer lobbied New Hampshire lawmakers to shield the company from further product liability litigation, while SIG was engaged in active lawsuits. House Bill 551 (HB551) protects gun manufacturers and federal firearms licensees from being held liable in tort based on the absence or presence of safety features. It was signed into effect on May 23rd without any comment from governor Kelly Ayotte.

Following the assassination of political commentator Charlie Kirk, SIG Sauer sparked controversy when it released the "Freedom" series of pistols, which featured the logo of the t-shirt Kirk was wearing when he was shot. The company promised to donate $50 to Turning Point USA for each "Freedom" pistol sold. SIG Sauer sold out of multiple pistols in the series, which were showcased on the homepage of its website.

On September 12, 2026, the Sig Sauer Academy facility in Epping, New Hampshire, was severely damaged by a three-alarm fire.

== Products ==
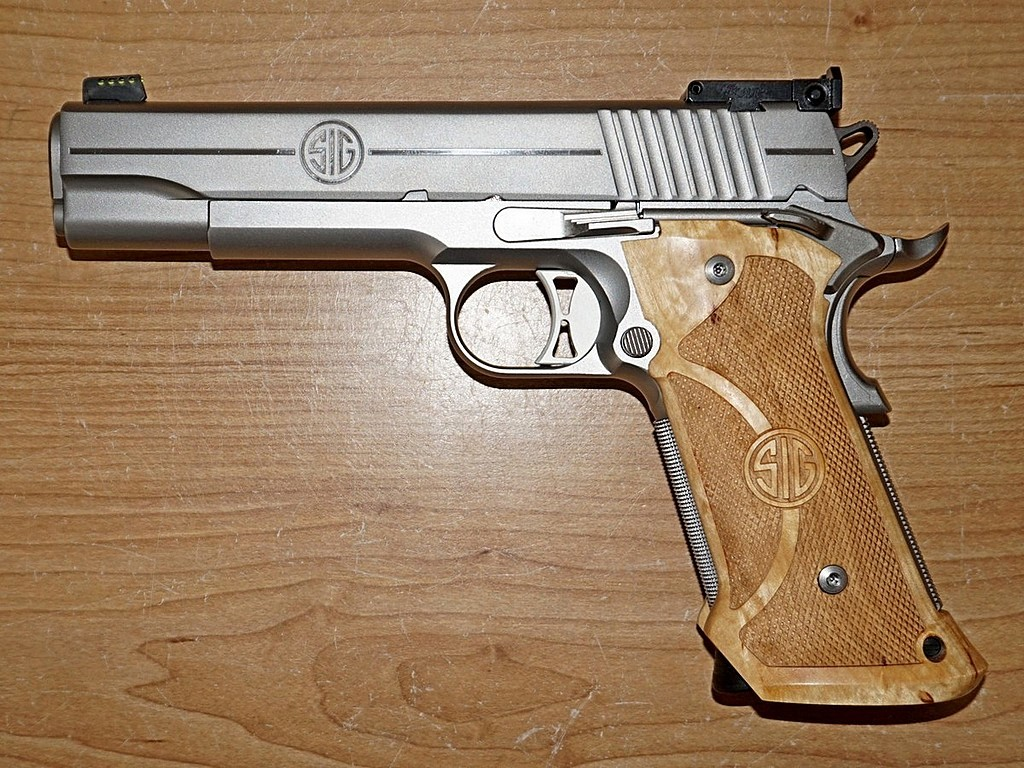
SIG Sauer 1911 Super Target .45 ACP

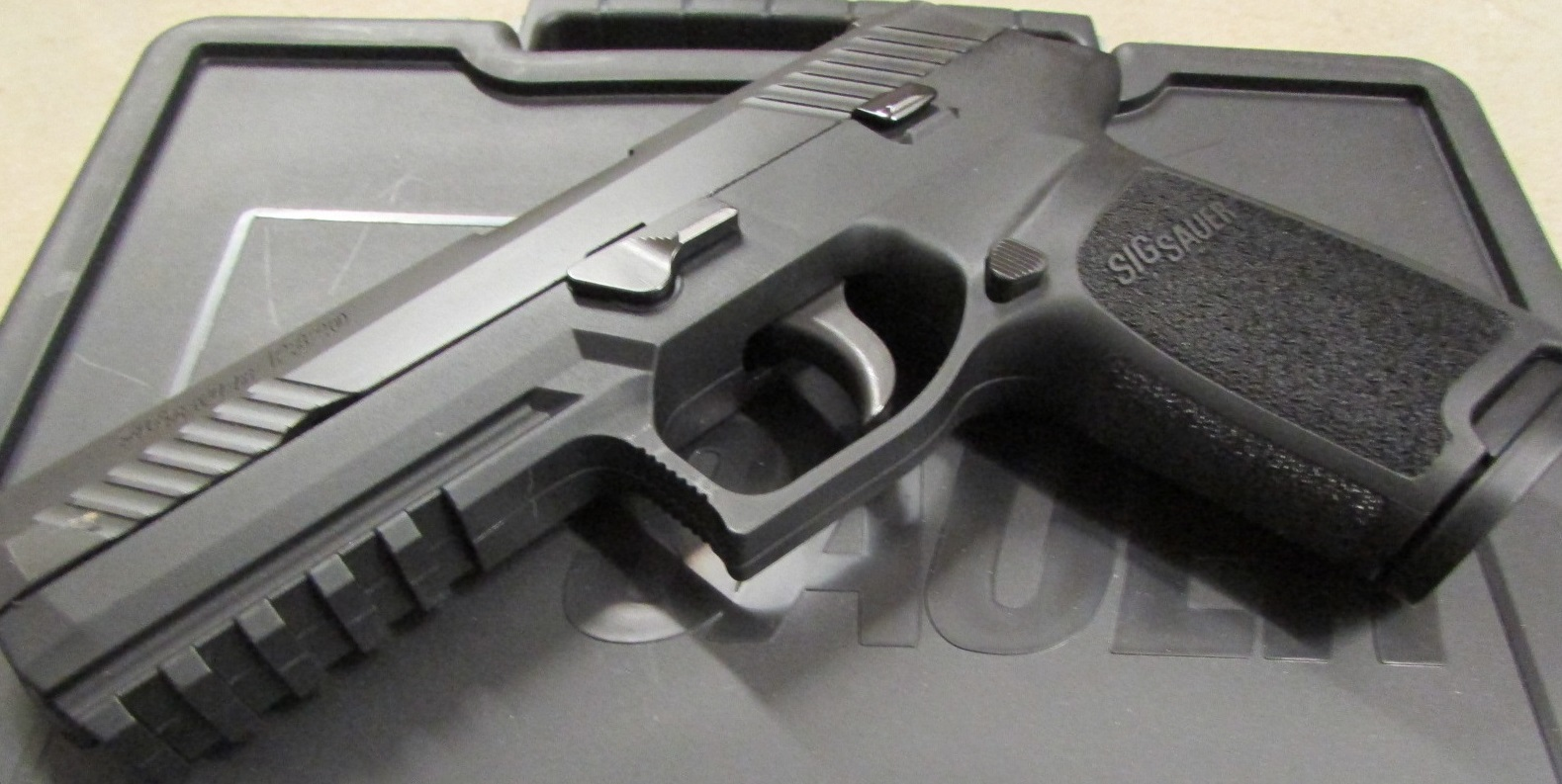
SIG Sauer P320

=== SIG Sauer brand ===
==== Semi-automatic pistols ====
Full size

- SIG Sauer P210
- SIG Sauer P220
- SIG Sauer P226
- SIG Sauer P227
- SIG Sauer P320
- SIG Sauer P385
- SIG Sauer Pro series
  - SP 2009
  - SP 2022
  - SP 2340
- SIG Sauer GSR
- SIG Sauer Mosquito
- 1911 Series
- SIG Sauer M17

Compact size

- SIG Sauer P224
- SIG Sauer P225
- SIG Sauer P226 LDC
- SIG Sauer P228 (M11)
- SIG Sauer P229
- P230/P232
- SIG Sauer P239
- SIG Sauer P245
- SIG Sauer M18
- SIG Sauer P322

Subcompact

- SIG Sauer P238
- SIG Sauer P290
- SIG Sauer P365
- SIG Sauer P938

Modular

- P250 Series
- P320 Series

==== Submachine guns ====
- SIG Sauer MPX

==== Rifles ====
- SSG 2000
- SSG 3000
- SIGM400
- SIG516
- SG 550
- SG 563
- SG 711
- SG 510
- SIG MCX
- SIG MCX-SPEAR
  - M7 rifle
- CROSS (AR-style bolt-action hybrid "precision hunting" rifle)

==== Light machine guns ====
- MG 338
  - M250

==== Electro-optics ====
- Riflescopes
  - Buckmasters series
  - EASY6 series
  - SIERRA series
  - TANGO series
  - WHISKEY series
- Red dot sights
  - JULIET series
  - ROMEO series
- Thermal scopes
  - ECHO series
- Rangefinders
  - Buckmasters 1500
  - Canyon
  - KILO series
- Spotting scopes
  - OSCAR6 HDX Pro
  - OSCAR8 27-55×80mm
- Binoculars
  - Buckmasters
  - Canyon HD
  - KILO series
  - ZULU series
- Tactical lights
  - FOXTROT series

=== SIG Air brand ===
==== Air pistol ====
- SIG Air P226 ASP
- SIG Air P320 ASP
- SIG Air P320-M17
- SIG Air X-Five ASP
- SIG Air P365
- SIG Air 1911
- SIG Air Precision Super Target Air Pistol (single-stroke pneumatic pistol)

==== Air rifle ====
- SIG Air MPX ASP
- SIG Air MCX ASP
- SIG Air MCX Virtus PCP
- SIG Air ASP20 (break barrel gas piston spring air rifle)

==== Airsoft ====
- SIG Air ProForce M17
- SIG Air ProForce M18
- SIG Air ProForce P229
- SIG Air ProForce MCX Virtus AEG
- SIG Air ProForce P365

== See also ==
- List of firearm brands
