= Zdeněk Kettner =

Czech politician

Member of the Chamber of Deputies
- In office 9 October 2021 – 8 October 2025

Personal details
- Born: 4 February 1974 (age 52) Teplice, Czech Republic
- Party: Public Affairs (2010–2012); SPD (since 2018)

Zdeněk Kettner (born 1974) is a Czech teacher, politician and former member of the Chamber of Deputies for the Freedom and Direct Democracy party (SPD) from 2021 to 2025.

== Biography ==
Kettner is a native of Teplice. He worked as a high school physics and computer science teacher for over twenty years. In 2021, he became chairman of the SPD in the Ústí nad Labem Region, replacing former SPD MP Tereza Hyťhová who left the party. He also serves as a member of the city council for Teplice. In this role, he has opposed spending money on expanding a migrant centre in Teplice. Kettner has also served as an MP in the Chamber of Representatives since 2021.
