= SIG Sauer AG =

Swiss firearms manufacturer

- Headquarters: Neuhausen am Rheinfall, Canton of Schaffhausen, Switzerland
- Products: Firearms
- Owner: L&O Holding
- Website: https://www.sigsauer.swiss/en/

SIG Sauer AG is a Swiss manufacturer of armaments. The company is part of L&O Holding, which also owns the German-based SIG Sauer GmbH & Co. KG and the US-based Sig Sauer Inc.

The company was previously registered as SAN Swiss Arms AG and changed its name to SIG Sauer AG in December 2019. It was known as SIG Arms AG before it was acquired in 2000 by the German investors Michael Lüke and Thomas Ortmeier from parent company Schweizerische Industrie Gesellschaft.

== History ==
The SIG "Schweizerische Industrie Gesellschaft" was founded as "Schweizerische Waggon-Fabrik bei Schaffhausen". Production of arms started in 1860 at the request of the Swiss Army. Between 1970 and 1975, SIG purchased Swiss-based Hämmerli AG as well as the German-based Hämmerli in Tiengen and SAUER & SOHN GmbH in Eckernförde. In 2000, SIG sold the small arms division to the Lüke & Ortmeier Group and the company became SAN Swiss Arms AG. The Castelli-Moser family from Zürich owns a small part of the company.

In 2020, the company changed its name to SIG Sauer AG.

== Products ==
Rifles

- SG 550 line of assault rifles (also includes the SG 551, SG 552 Commando carbines, the SG 553 and various semi-automatic sporting variants). The SG 550 is the standard service rifle of the Swiss Armed Forces and has been exported to several other countries in limited numbers.
- SAN 511

Pistols

- SIG Sauer SP 2022 (non-blowback, polymer variant)

Grenade launchers

- GLG 40 and GL 5040/5140

Pellet rifles

- TG-1
