= SIG Sauer P226 =

Swiss-German semi-automatic pistol

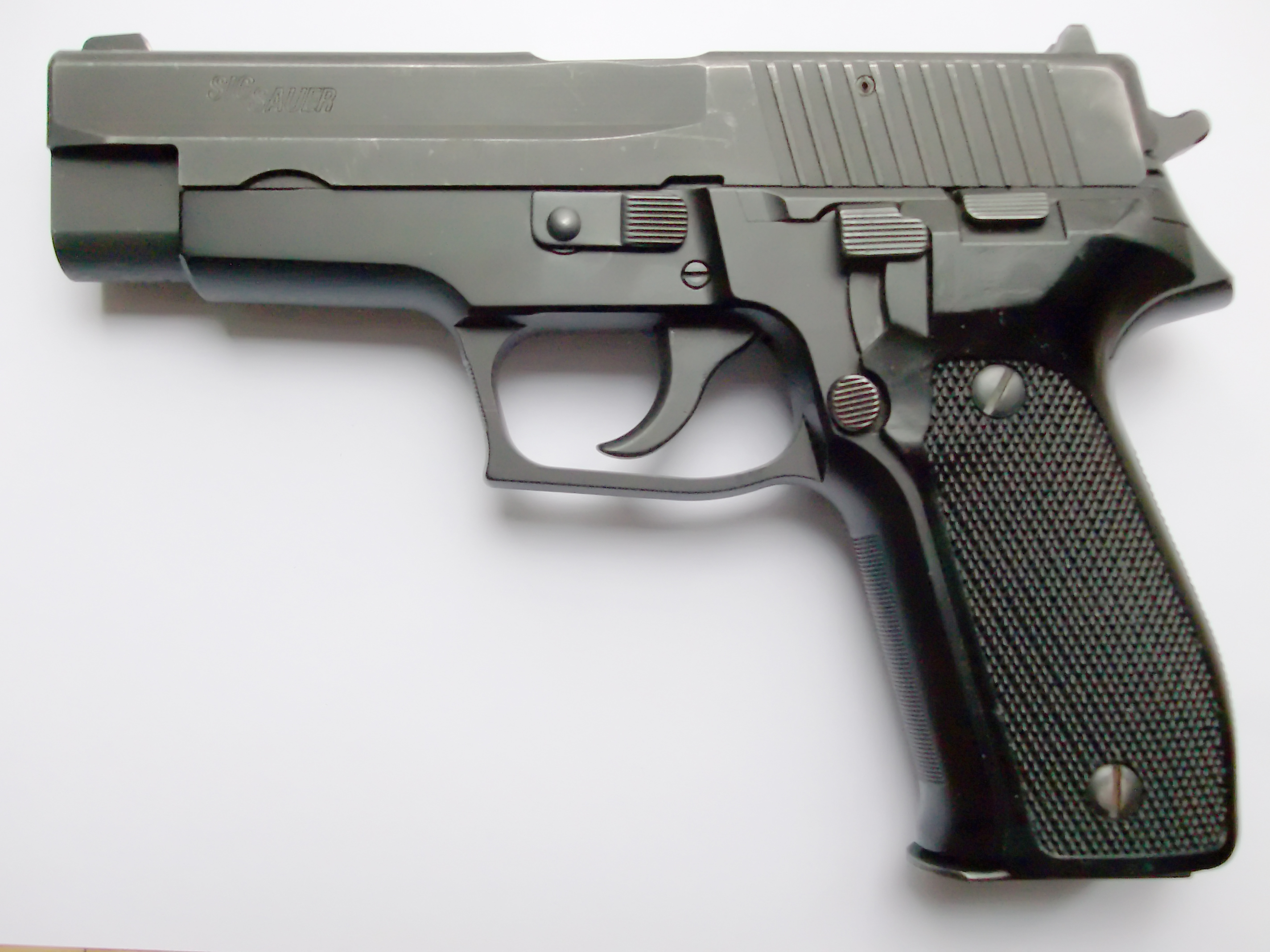
- Type: Semi-automatic pistol
- Place of origin: West Germany; Switzerland

Service history
- In service: 1985–present
- Used by: See Users

Production history
- Designed: 1980–1983
- Manufacturer: SIG Sauer
- Produced: 1984–present
- Variants: See Variants

Specifications
- Mass: 964 g (34.0 oz) (w/ magazine)
- Length: 196 mm (7.7 in)
- Barrel length: 112 mm (4.4 in)
- Width: 38.1 mm (1.5 in)
- Height: 140 mm (5.5 in)
- Cartridge: 9×19mm Parabellum; 7.65mm Parabellum; 9×21mm IMI; .357 SIG; .40 S&W; .22 Long Rifle (Classic 22 model only)
- Action: Mechanically locked, recoil operated (DA/SA, DAK (double action Kellerman), or DAO), or SAO
- Feed system: 10-, 12-, 13-, or 15-round magazine (.40 S&W, .357 SIG); 10-, 15-, 17-, 18-, or 20-round magazine (9×19mm Parabellum, 9×21mm IMI); 10-round polymer magazine (Classic 22 only)
- Sights: Iron sights

The SIG Sauer P226 is a full-sized service pistol made by SIG Sauer. This model is available in four chamberings: the 9×19mm Parabellum, .40 S&W, .357 SIG, or .22 Long Rifle. It has the same mechanism of operation as the SIG Sauer P220, but is developed to use higher capacity, double stack magazines in place of the single stack magazines of the P220.

The P226 itself has spawned further sub-variants; the P228 and P229 are both compact versions of the double stack P226 design, while the P224 is a subcompact variant. The SIG Sauer P226 and its variants are in service with numerous law enforcement and military organizations worldwide.

== History ==
Schweizerische Industrie Gesellschaft (SIG) is a Swiss company, now known as Sig Sauer AG. In 1975, SIG entered into an agreement with German gun manufacturer J.P. Sauer & Sohn to develop and market a new handgun which became the P220. The P220 was the first SIG Sauer handgun sold in the U.S. It was marketed initially by Browning as the Browning BDA. The SIG Sauer P220 is a refinement of the Petter-Browning design used in the SIG P210. The locked breech design is very different and was pioneered by SIG Sauer.

The P226 was designed for entry into the XM9 Service Pistol Trials (see also Joint Service Small Arms Program) that were held by the U.S. Army in 1984 on behalf of the U.S. Armed Forces to find a replacement for the M1911A1 and 24 other makes of handgun in U.S. military service. Only the Beretta 92SBF and the SIG P226 satisfactorily completed the trials. According to a GAO report, Beretta was awarded the M9 contract for the 92F due to a lower total package price. The P226 cost less per pistol than the 92F, but SIG's package price with magazines and spare parts was higher than Beretta's. The Navy SEALs, however, later chose to adopt the P226 as the P226 MK25 with special corrosion protection.

For the U.S. military XM9 trials, the P226 was imported by Saco Defense. Interarms took over importing when the pistol was introduced for civilian sales. SIG Sauer eventually founded SIGARMS, Inc. (now SIG Sauer) in the United States to handle importation of their products. In 2000, SIG Holding AG sold J.P. Sauer & Sohn GmbH to two German businessmen. The brand name SIG Sauer remained at J.P. Sauer & Sohn GmbH.

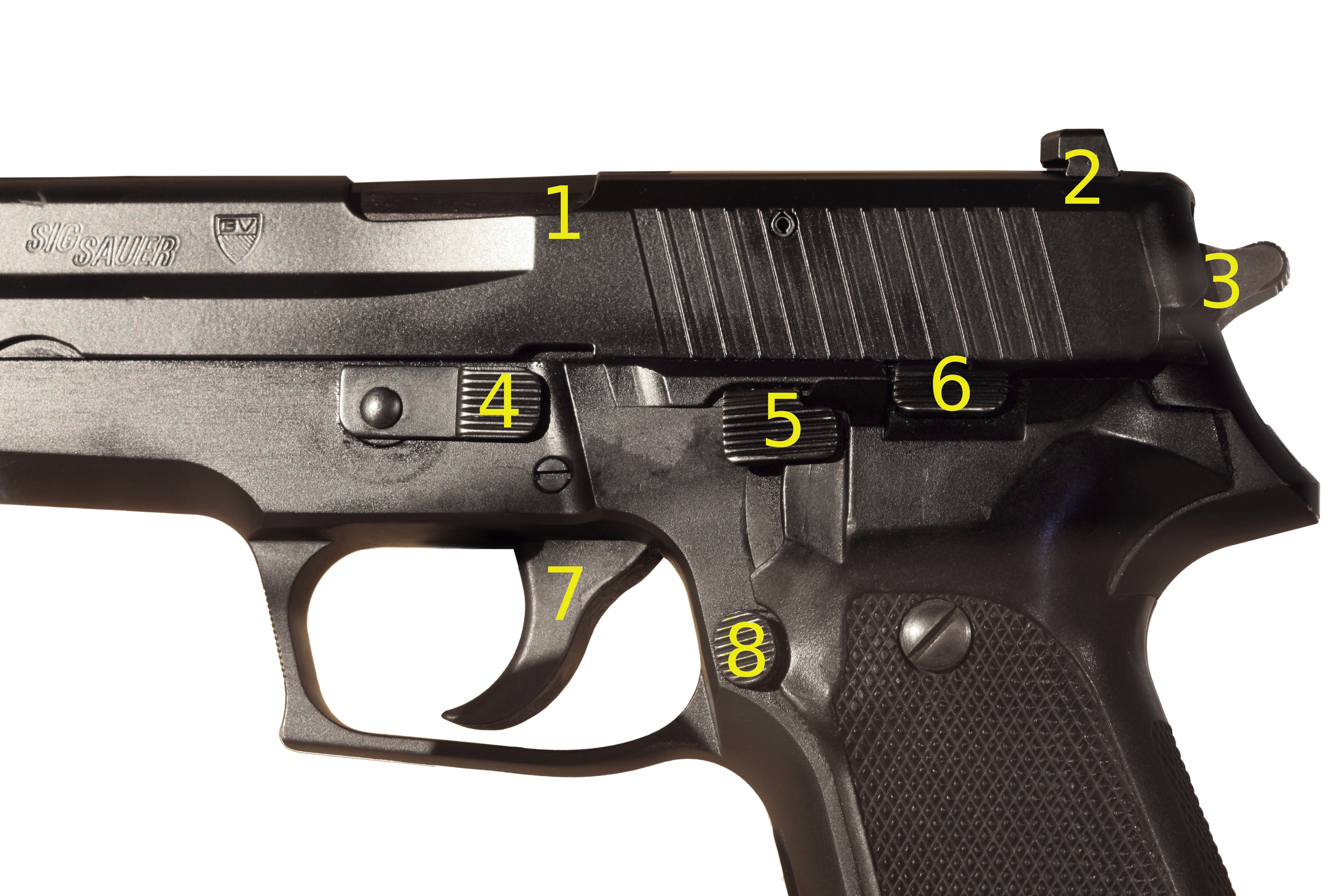
Detail of the controls and parts: 1. Ejection port/locking lug, 2. Rear sights, 3. Hammer, 4. Takedown lever, 5. Decocker, 6. Slide stop, 7. Trigger, 8. Magazine release.

== Manufacture ==
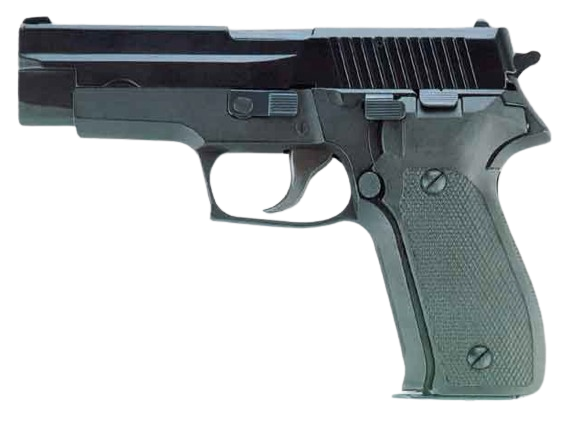
PC-9 ZOAF, the Iranian clone of the P226.

SIG Sauer firearms are manufactured in Eckernförde, Germany by Sig Sauer, GmbH and in Newington, New Hampshire, United States by SIG Sauer Inc., (formerly SIGARMS Inc.). Both of these companies along with Swiss Arms AG, Mauser Jagdwaffen GmbH, J.P. Sauer & Sohn, John Rigby & Company, German Sport Guns GmbH and Blaser Jagdwaffen Gmbh are subsidiaries of Luke and Ortmeier Gruppe of Emsdetten, Germany.

Copies of the P226 are produced in China by Norinco, under the name of NP22. These were subcontracted to the Zhejiang Xinhua Machinery Manufacturing Co., Ltd. (浙江省机电集团), known as State Factory 972 or known as the Xinhua Factory. Subsequent manufacturing improved on its ability to withstand failure after more than 10,000 rounds are fired.

The variants consist of the NP22, NP22A, NP34, NP56 and the NP58. The SDM XM9 is a variant of the NP22 chambered in 9×21mm for countries that don't allow any pistol calibers that are only for the military and police. The LP3 and LP4 are versions of the NP22 and NP34 with manual safeties on the slide. The NP762 is chambered to fire 7.62×25mm bullets, which were exported in 2019. They were first made by Xinhua in 1999 and were known then as the NP2000 for potential contracts in China for the PLA and various law enforcement agencies.

The Pc 9 Zoaf is a clone of the P226 made in Iran.

== Variants ==
=== P226 Navy ===
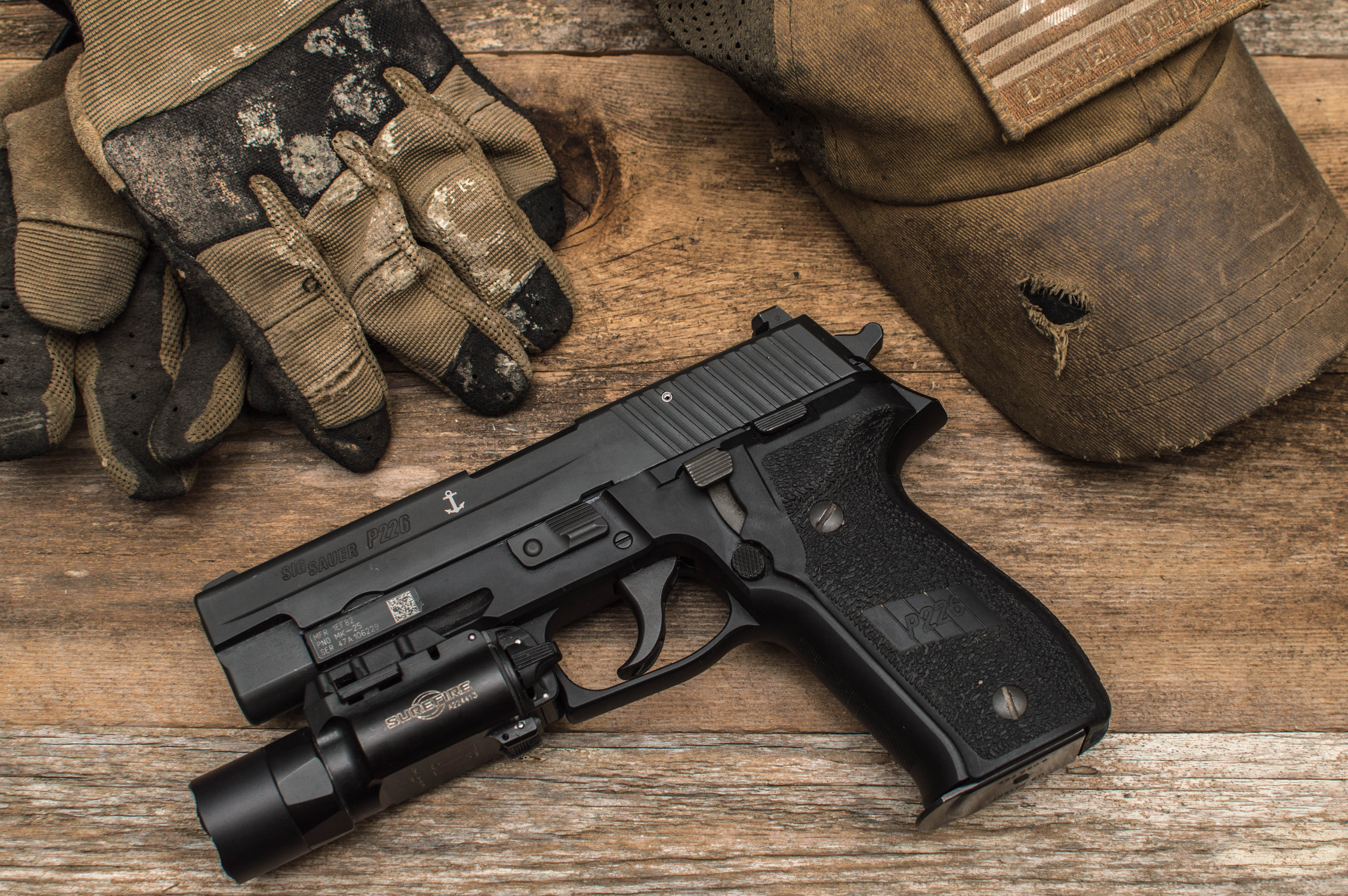
A P226 Mk25 model featuring the UID barcode, Silver Anchor and a Surefire X300 Ultra weapon light mounted on the Picatinny rail.

U.S. Navy SEAL teams started using the SIG P226 in the 1980s, after German Kampfschwimmer tested them successfully. In 1989, the P226 was adopted by the U.S. Navy SEALs and DEVGRU under the name Mk25 Mod 0.

The first Naval Special Warfare inspired P226 pistols to be offered to the public were the NSW Commemoratives, issued in early 2004. The SIG P226-9-NAVY is a version of the SIG P226 produced that features a stainless steel slide engraved with an anchor to designate them as Naval Special Warfare pistols. SIGARMS raised $100,000 for the Special Operations Warrior Foundation through the sale of these NSW serialized pistols. The pistol with the serial number NSW0001 was sold during a live auction on the US-wide syndicated Laura Ingraham radio show for an additional $25,000. Later produced commercial versions added a universal rail for accessory attachments while retaining the anchor of previous models, but do not have the SIGLITE Night Sights.

=== P226 E2 ===
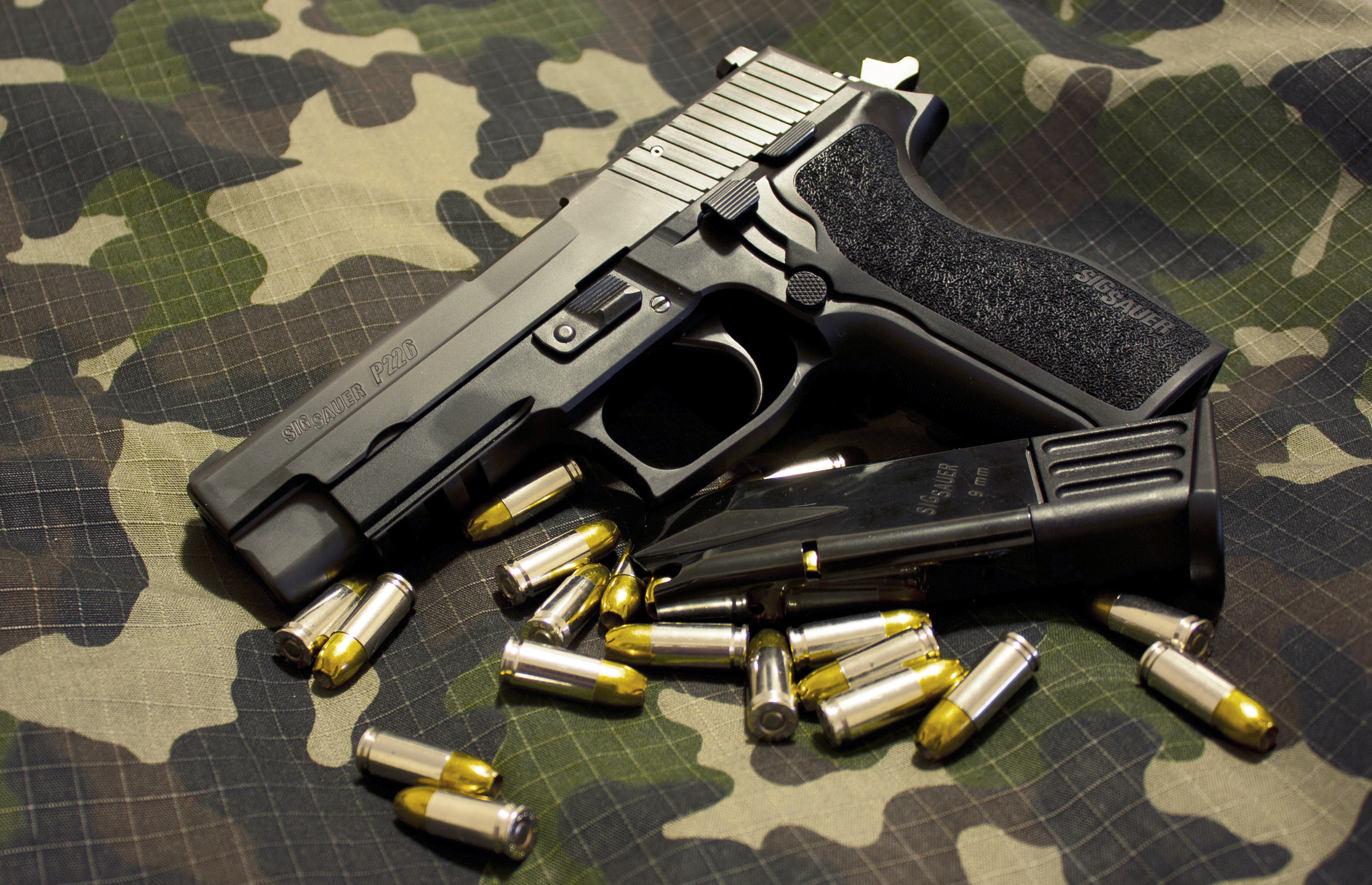
SIG Sauer P226 E2. Note magazine capacity in this picture is capped at 10 rounds.

Introduced at the 2010 SHOT Show, the P226 E2 at the time was a significant update to the P226 line. 'E2' (pronounced 'E-squared'), or otherwise known as "Enhanced Ergonomics", is SIG Sauer's attempt to make the large frame gun more ergonomic for persons with small and medium-sized hands. A reduced grip size and reduced reach trigger bring the trigger face back more than 13 mm (0.5 in), thus potentially allowing better trigger manipulation and control for a greater number of shooters. Other standard features include the Short Reset Trigger, aggressive grip finish texture, and a new wrap-around, one-piece grip panel configuration. The gun was discontinued from the P226 model lineup at the end of 2010 but the E2-style grip system has been adopted on and carried over to other P226 variants.

=== P228 (M11) ===
SIG P228 & P229
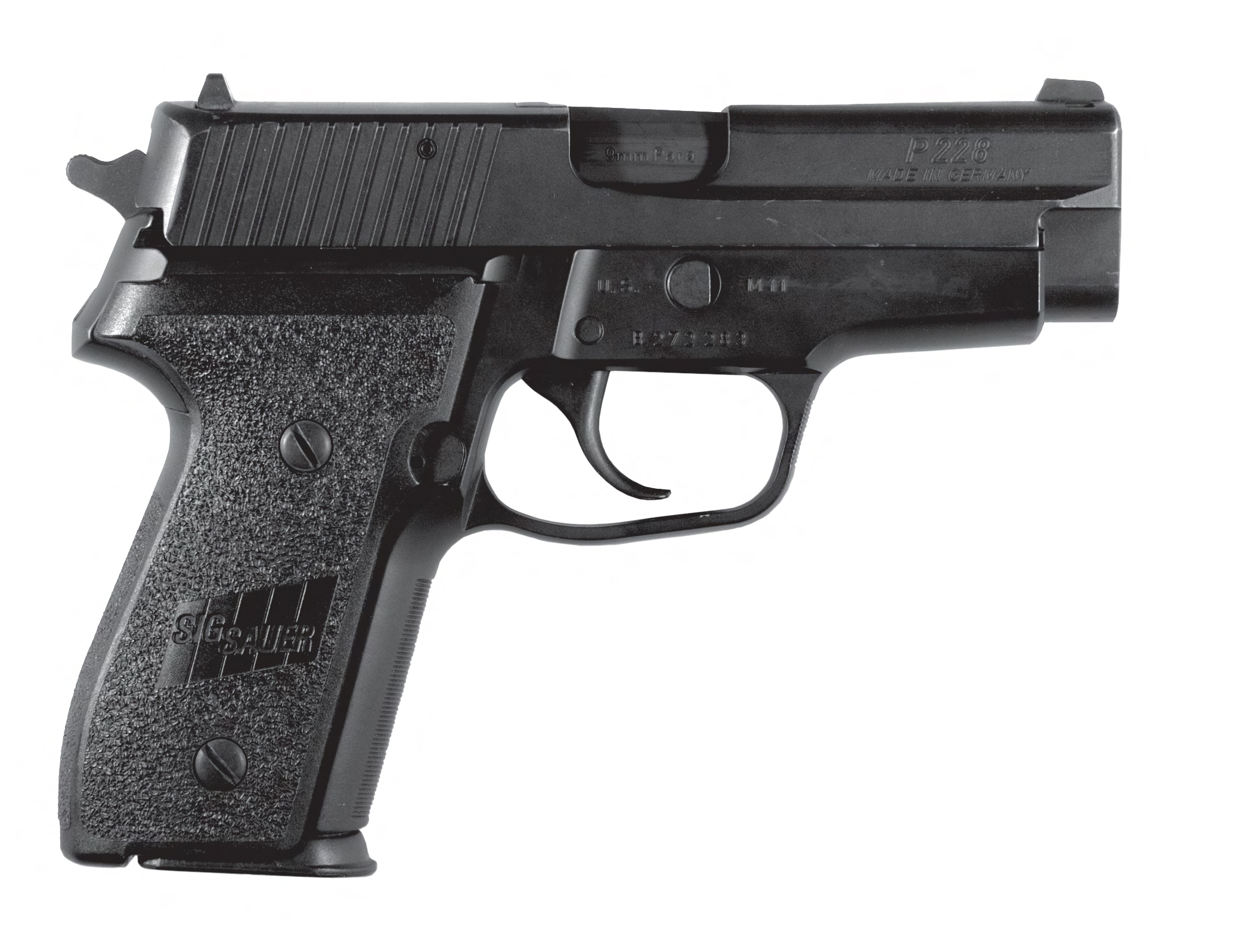
- SIG Sauer P228/M11
- Type: Semi-automatic pistol
- Place of origin: Germany; Switzerland

Service history
- In service: 1989–present
- Used by: See Users

Production history
- Designed: 1989
- Manufacturer: SIG Sauer
- Produced: 1989–present
- Variants: See Variants

Specifications
- Mass: 825 g (29.1 oz) (P228); 905 g (31.9 oz) (P229)
- Length: 180 mm (7.1 in)
- Barrel length: 99 mm (3.9 in)
- Width: 38 mm (1.5 in)
- Height: 137 mm (5.4 in)
- Cartridge: 9×19mm Parabellum (P228 & P229).40 S&W, .357 SIG (P229 only)
- Action: mechanically locked, recoil operated (DA/SA or DAO)
- Feed system: 9×19: 10-round, 13-round, or 15-round box magazine; .40 S&W and .357 SIG: 12-round magazine
- Sights: Iron sights

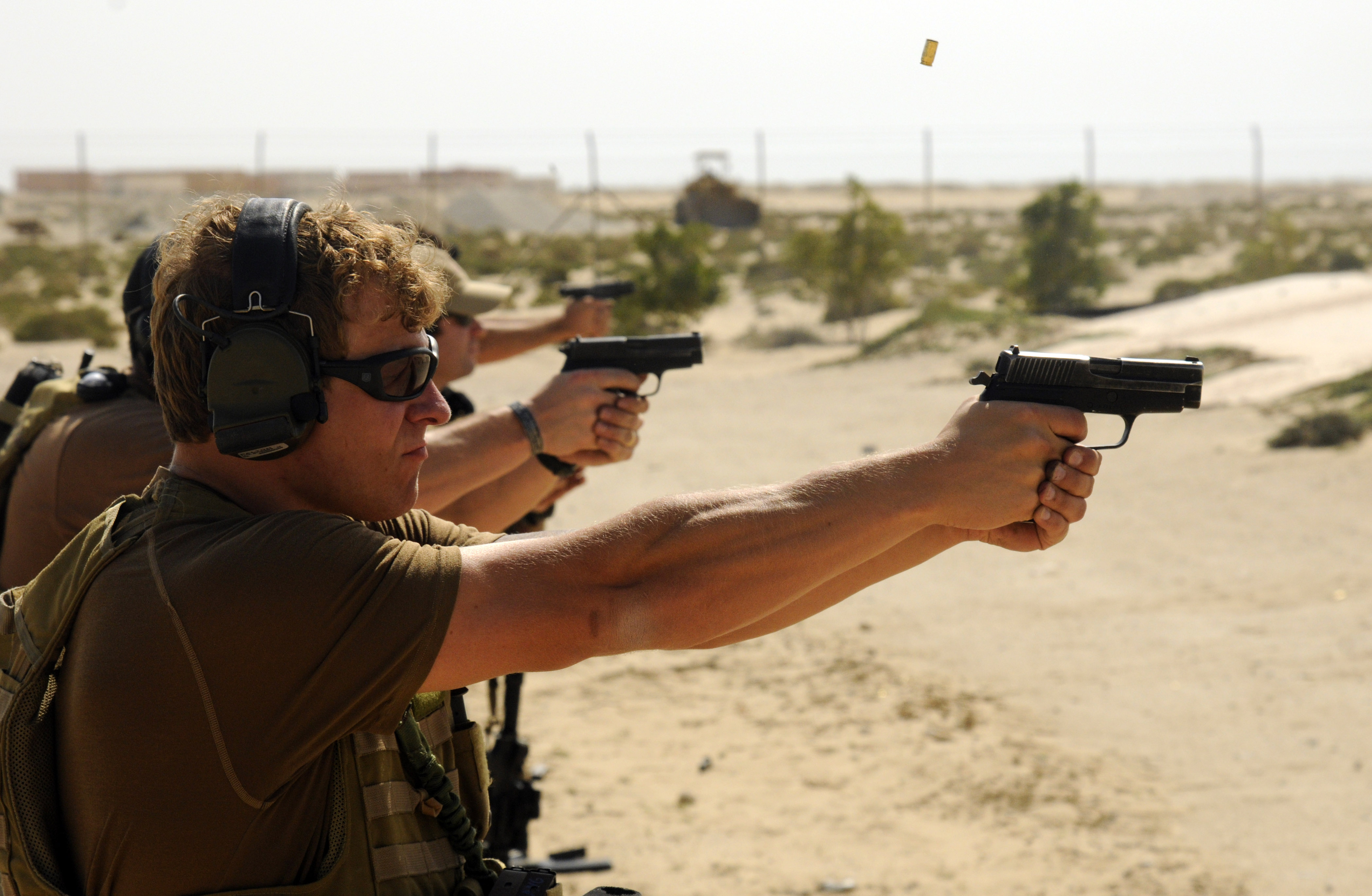
U.S. Navy Explosive Ordnance Disposal range practice

A compact version of the P226, the P228 was introduced in 1988. It is in use with various law enforcement agencies and also with the United States Armed Forces, where it is designated as the M11. The P228 has a shorter slide and barrel than the P226. Unlike the P226, the P228 is available only in 9×19mm Parabellum with a 13-round magazine, but can also use P226 15- or 20-round magazines. Aftermarket magazines extend the capacity of the P228 to 15 rounds.

From a distance, the P228 can be differentiated from the P226 by comparing the trigger guards (the P228's is curved, while the P226's is slightly hooked) and the barrel and slide lengths (the P228's barrel 99 mm (3.9 in), thus having a corresponding shorter slide). Also in a side-by-side comparison the P228 would appear slightly shorter (15 mm (0.59 in) shorter) than the P226. The larger capacity P226 magazine can also be employed in the P228 although it extends from the base of the grip. Civilian sales of the P228 were discontinued with the introduction of 9mm chambering in the P229 but were recently reintroduced in limited quantities to civilians with an accessory rail and hooked trigger guard, designated the P228R.

The P229 is nearly identical to the P228, however its slide is made from milled stainless steel (versus the P228's folded carbon steel slide) and is available in 9mm, .40 S&W, and .357 SIG. In the summer of 2012, SIG Sauer announced they were releasing the M11A1, which is essentially the milled-slide P229 chambered in 9mm with P228-labeled grips, a short reset trigger, SIGLITE tritium night sights, Mec-Gar 15-round magazines, and a military style smart tag and serial number. Later in 2012, U.S. Air Force M11b versions of the P228 were released for civilian sale. The M11 is to be replaced in the Army and Air Force through the Modular Handgun System program. On January 19, 2017, it was announced that the SIG Sauer P320 Compact (M18) had been selected to replace the M11 as the U.S military service pistol. One factor in winning the Modular Handgun System competition was the ability to employ 9mm Parabellum, .357 Sig or .40 S&W cartridges within the same basic frame.

=== P229 ===
Introduced in 1992, the P229 is an upgrade to the P228 being an identical compact firearm often used for duty or concealed carry purposes. Developed specifically for the U.S. market and assembled with both German and U.S.-made parts, the P229 features a heavier slide to tolerate more powerful rounds than the P228 is capable of tolerating. The standard version features a DA/SA trigger. The pistol has also been made available in a Double Action Kellerman (DAK) model, which is a DAO system with two trigger reset points, and a lighter, smoother pull than that of traditional DAO handguns. Most of the above-mentioned factory variants of the P226 are also available for the P229, including the Equinox option, Elite lineup, as well as a SAS GEN 2 model.

The P229 differs from its cousin the P226 in several respects, and was originally introduced to supplement and then replace the P228 by adding the .357 SIG and .40 S&W as available chamberings. The P229 was the first production handgun introduced that could chamber the .357 SIG round. The P226 and P228 were originally manufactured using a stamped-steel slide on an aluminum alloy frame. The P229 consists of a CNC-milled stainless steel slide, typically colored black with a Nitron finish. The P229's milled steel slide was introduced to handle the higher slide velocities created by the .357 SIG and .40 S&W loads, which the stamped slide of the P228 could not handle without the use of a much stiffer recoil spring. This would have made operating the slide manually much more difficult, so the use of a milled stainless slide (coupled with the new milling and stainless production capabilities found in the U.S. factory) with a standard weight recoil spring was chosen instead.

A standard weight recoil spring for the P229 is 71 N (16 lb_{f}). A spring weight of 89 N (20 lb_{f}) or higher would have been required if a stamped slide was used for the .40 S&W or .357 SIG chamberings. The SAAMI maximum chamber pressures of 9mm, 9mm +P, .40 S&W, and .357 SIG are as follows: 240 MPa (35,000 psi); 265 MPa (38,500 psi); 240 MPa (35,000 psi); and 280 MPa (40,000 psi). The slide on the P226 was redesigned in a similar fashion, and civilian sales of the P228 were discontinued in early 2005 due to declining sales and the advent of the P229 in 9mm. The P226 and P229 are both available with optional accessory rails and optional forged stainless steel frames.

The P229 can be chambered in .22 LR, 9mm, .40 S&W or .357 SIG. Changing between .40 S&W and .357 SIG is as simple as switching out the barrel; both calibers use the same magazine. Conversion barrels also allow a P229 or P226 to change between a .40 S&W/.357 SIG to a 9mm caliber. The 9mm model (both railed and non-railed) can be converted to .22 LR, but in the past its receivers were not designed to provide the space needed for handling the larger rounds of .357 SIG and .40 S&W. As SIG Sauer has slowly begun adopting the E2-style grip system across the P229 model range in 2011—a move similar to what is also happening to the larger P226—they have also begun using the .357 SIG/.40 S&W spec frame dimensions for their factory 9mm P229s, presumably to streamline the number of variations in parts needed to be kept in inventory. Although the manufacturer has announced that older-configuration magazines will continue to operate in the new receiver configuration, SIG Sauer has nonetheless revised new P229 9mm factory magazines to a design that is specific to the resized magazine well of the newly reconfigured receiver/frame. As a consequence, the newer magazines are not back-compatible, due to their larger width.

=== P224 ===
The P224 is a subcompact variant of the series. It has a barrel length of 3.5 inches (8.9 cm) and an unloaded weight of 29 ounces (820 g). It has a 12-round capacity when chambered in 9mm; it is also available in .357 SIG and .40 S&W. The P224 was introduced in 2012 as double-action only (DAO); it was reintroduced in 2013 as double action / single action (DA/SA) with a decocking lever. The P224 was discontinued in 2016.

== Users ==
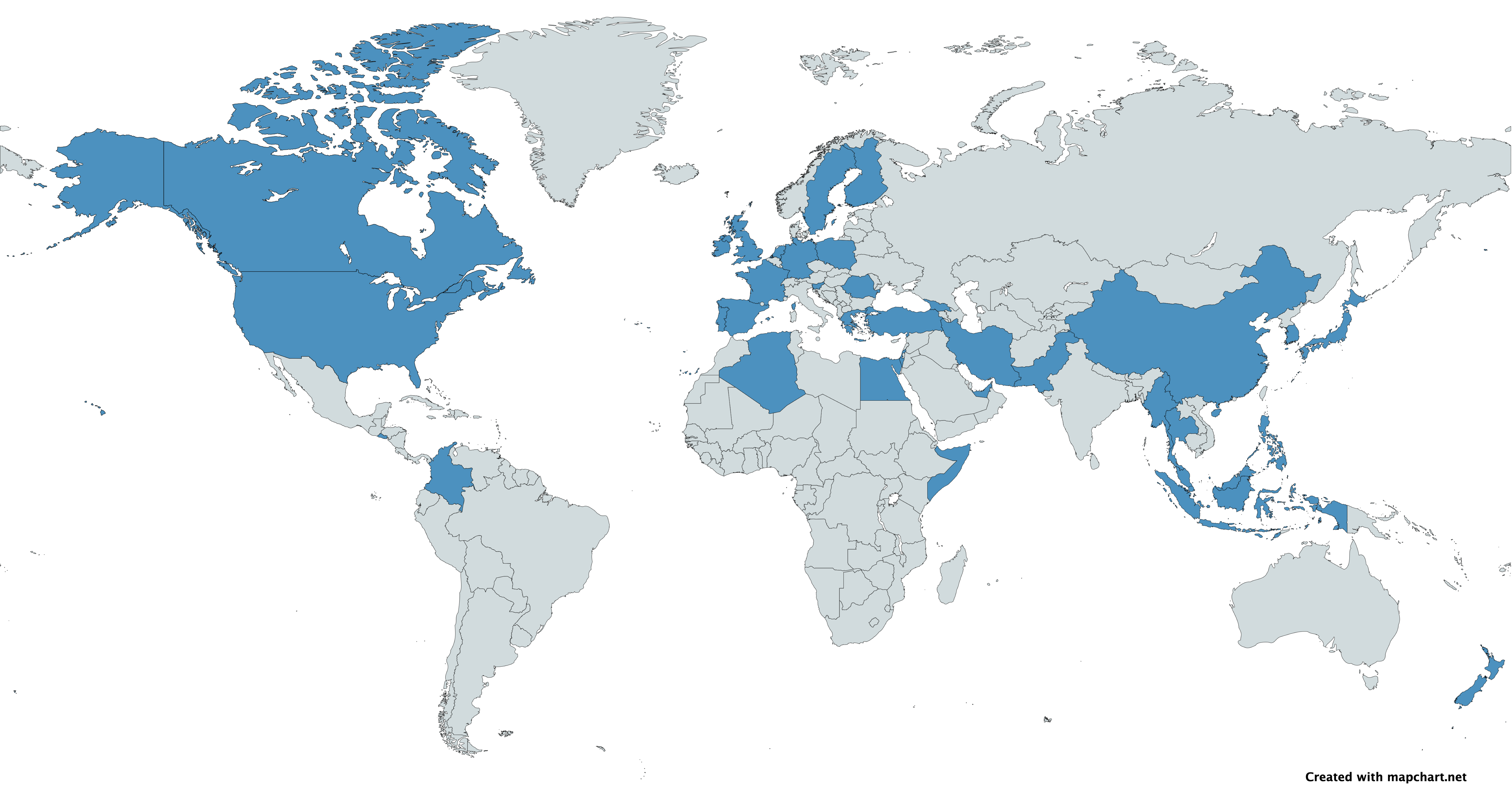
Map with SIG Sauer P226 users in blue

Country	Organization Name	Model	Reference
Canada	Canadian Special Forces (Joint Task Force 2)	P226	
Canada	Royal Canadian Mounted Police (Emergency Response Team)	P226	
Canada	Royal Newfoundland Constabulary	P226	
Canada	Vancouver Police Department	P226	
China	Hubei province SWAT	NP22	
China	Tianjin Municipal Public Security Bureau SWAT	NP22	
China	Shanghai Municipal Public Security Bureau SWAT	NP22	
China	People's Liberation Army Special Operations Forces	NP22	
Colombia	Colombian National Police	SP2022	Standard side weapon of the Colombian Police, replaced the .38 S&W caliber weapons in service since 2005.
El Salvador	National Civil Police of El Salvador	P228	
Egypt	Egyptian Paratroopers, Navy Special Forces and Sa'ka Forces Unit 777	-	
Finland	Finnish Army	P226	
France	National Gendarmerie Intervention Group (GIGN), The Tactical Squad of French Gendarmerie	P226, P228	
France	Escouade de contre-terrorisme et de libération d'otages (ECTLO), counter-terrorist and hostages rescue squad of French Navy	P226	
Georgia	Used by Georgian Police and Georgian Special Forces	P226	
Germany	Spezialeinsatzkommandos (SEKs) of the police, and the Federal Criminal Police Office	P226, P229	
Greece	EKAM counter-terrorist unit of the Hellenic Police	P229	
Indonesia	Komando Pasukan Khusus (Kopassus) special forces group of the Indonesian Army	P226, P228	
Indonesia	Komando Pasukan Katak (Kopaska) tactical diver group of the Indonesian Navy	P226, P228	
Indonesia	Komando Pasukan Gerak Cepat (Kopasgat) special force of Indonesian Air Force	P226	
Iran	Defense Industries Organization	Pc 9 Zoaf	
Ireland	Defence Forces Army Ranger Wing	P226, P228	
Ireland	Garda; plainclothes officers, SDU, ERU, ASU, NBCI, Drugs and Organised Crime Bureau	P226	
Israel	Israeli Special Forces Units	P226, P228	
Japan	Special Boarding Unit	P226R	
Malaysia	10th Parachute Bridge The Malaysian Army	P226	
Malaysia	Grup Gerak Khas or Special Operation Forces Group Command The Malaysian Army	P226	
Malaysia	PASKAU Special Air Forces Squadron The Royal Malaysian Air Force	P226	
Malaysia	Tiger Platoon-GOF Batalion Infantry General Operation Force The Royal Malaysian Police	P226, P228	
Myanmar	Myanmar Army	P226	
Netherlands	M-Squadron of the Netherlands Marine Corps	P226	
New Zealand	New Zealand Defence Force	P226, P226R designated P226AL	
Pakistan	Special Services Group	P226, P229	
Philippines	Philippine Air Force	P228	
Poland	GROM special group	P228	
Portugal	Portuguese Armed Forces	P228	
Romania	Brigada Specială de Intervenție a Jandarmeriei (BSIJ)	P226	
Romania	Special Operations Forces (FOS)	P226	
Singapore	Singapore Armed Forces	P226	
Slovenia	Special Unit (Slovenian Police - "CT")	P226 Enhanced Elite	
Slovenia	Security and Protection Center (Slovenian Police - "CP")	P226	
Slovenia	Special Operations Unit (Slovenian Army - "SF")	P226	
Slovenia	Specialized unit for Special Tactics (Slovenian Army - "MP SWAT")	P226	
South Korea	Republic of Korea Naval Special Warfare Flotilla	P226N	
Spain	Grupo Especial de Operaciones (GEO) of the Cuerpo Nacional de Policía	P226	
Spain	Bilbao Police	P229	
Sweden	Swedish Police Authority	P225, P226, P228, P229, P239	
Taiwan	Republic of China Marine Corps	P226 MK25	
Trinidad and Tobago	Trinidad and Tobago Police Service		
Thailand	Royal Thai Army	P226	
Turkey	Special Forces	P229	
Turkey	Underwater Offence Group Command	P226, P229	
United Arab Emirates	United Arab Emirates Army	P228	
United Arab Emirates	Various special forces	P228	
United Kingdom	British Army (including Special Air Service and Royal Military Police Close Protection Unit), Royal Air Force	P226 (standard model designated L105A1, corrosion resistant version designated L106A1), P226R (designated L105A2 or L106A2), P228 (designated L107A1), P229 (designated L117A1/A2)	
United Kingdom	Ministry of Defence Police	P229	
United States	United States Army (Including United States Army Criminal Investigation Command)	P228 (designated M11)	
United States	United States Air Force	P228 (designated M11)	
United States	United States Coast Guard	P229R DAK (.40 S&W)	
United States	United States Department of Homeland Security	P229 DAK (.40 S&W)	
United States	U.S. Diplomatic Security Service (U.S. Department of State)	P226R, P228, P229, P229R (9×19mm)	
United States	U.S. Federal Air Marshals	P229 (.357 SIG)	
United States	Naval Criminal Investigative Service	P229R DAK (.40 S&W), P239 DAK (.40 S&W)	
United States	United States Navy (Naval Special Warfare, Including Navy EOD)	P226 (designated MK25), P226R, P228 (designated M11), and P229 (9×19mm)	
United States	United States Department of Veterans Affairs Police	P229R DAK (9×19mm)	
United States	U.S. Secret Service	P229 (.357 SIG)	
United States	United States Postal Inspection Service	P229R DAK (.40 S&W)	
United States	Texas Ranger Division	P226 (.357 SIG)	
United States	New York City Police Department	P226 DAO (9×19mm) (retired from service)	
United States	Delaware State Police	P226, P229 (.357 SIG)	
United States	Ohio State Highway Patrol	P320 (.40 S&W)	
United States	Orlando Police Department	P226R (9×19mm)	
United States	Memphis Police Department	P229 DAK	
United States	Shelby County Sheriff's Office	P226, P229 DAK (.40 S&W)	
United States	Connecticut State Police	P229 (.40 S&W), P220 (.45 ACP)	
United States	Franklin County Sheriff's Office (Ohio)	P226R (9×19mm)	
United States	Ferguson, Missouri Police Department	P229 (.40 S&W)	
United States	Houston Police Department	P229R, P226 (.40 S&W)	
United States	Sacramento Police Department	P226R, P229R, P239	
United States	San Francisco Police Department	P226R	
United States	Tampa Police Department Tactical Response Team (TRT/SWAT)	P226R (9×19mm)	
United States	Fairfax County Police Department	P226R (.40 S&W)	

== See also ==
- Joint Combat Pistol
- M9 pistol
- SIG Sauer P320
  - SIG Sauer M17
- Zastava CZ99

== Bibliography ==
- Thompson, Leroy (2020). The Browning High-Power Pistol. Oxford: Osprey Publishing. ISBN 978-1-4728-3809-4.
