= SIG Sauer P365 =

Polymer frame semi-automatic handgun

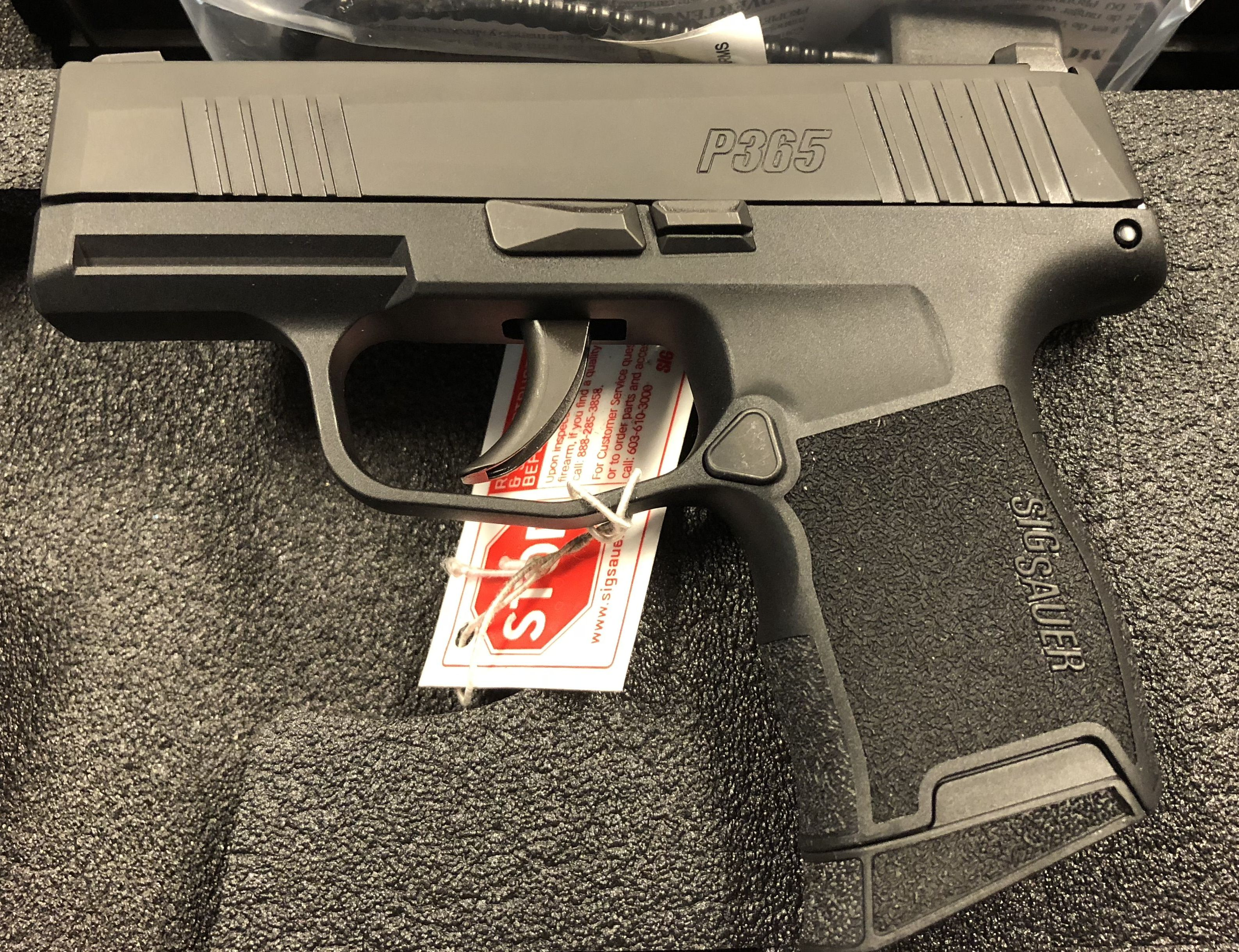
- P365 micro-compact handgun left side showing controls, rail, and extended tab 10-round magazine
- Type: Semi-automatic pistol
- Place of origin: United States

Production history
- Designed: 2017
- Manufacturer: SIG Sauer, Newington, NH
- Produced: 2018–present
- Variants: P365 XL, P365 SAS, P365X, P365-380

Specifications (P365)
- Mass: 500 g (18 oz)
- Length: 147 mm (5.8 in)
- Barrel length: 78 mm (3.1 in)
- Width: 26 mm (1.0 in)
- Height: 109 mm (4.3 in)
- Cartridge: 9×19mm Parabellum, .380 ACP
- Action: SIG Sauer system (short recoil locked breech)
- Rate of fire: Semi-automatic
- Feed system: Box magazines: 10-round (optional finger extension); 12-round magazine with grip sleeve; 15-round magazine with grip sleeve; 17-round magazine with grip sleeve; 21-round magazine with grip sleeve; 32-round extended magazine; 50-round drum magazine
- Sights: Tritium XRAY3 Day/Night Sights, Three Dot, Combat Sighted

The SIG Sauer P365 is a striker-fired subcompact semi-automatic pistol manufactured by SIG Sauer, intended for everyday carry and is produced in Newington, New Hampshire.

== Features ==
The P365 is a striker fired, short-recoil handgun with a stainless steel slide, treated with a black Nitron finish, and a stainless steel frame along with a polymer grip module.

The slide has serrations on both front and back for easy slide manipulation.

=== Magazine ===
It is primarily chambered in 9×19mm Parabellum and is rated for +P (higher pressure) ammunition while utilizing offset double-stack magazines.

The polymer grip accepts a double-stack 10-round, 12-round, 15-round magazine, or 17-round magazine.

A variant chambered in .380 ACP was introduced in February 2022.

The magazine is released by a triangular button on the grip located at the undercut trigger guard section.

Per SIG Sauer, the P365 has the lowest bore-axis ratio of any handgun currently made.

=== Sights ===
The P365 is offered with Tritium XRAY3 Day/Night Sights and two 10-round magazines; one flush fit and the other with an extended finger tab, and a stainless steel frame with polymer grip module.

The sights are green tritium three-dot night sights that are made of steel and are capable of being used to cycle the slide in the case of one handed use being necessary. Aiming is by combat sighting. (Note: "the front sight completely covers the bullseye of the target.")

=== Attachments ===
A proprietary rail is located below the barrel of the P365, P365x and P365xl models.

Both red and green lasers and a light will be offered as accessory items for this proprietary rail.

Adapters to convert the proprietary rail to a standard rail for use with standard rail accessories are also available.

=== Disassembly ===
Disassembly requires no tools and does not require that the trigger be pulled.

== Comparisons ==
The grip encloses a stainless steel fire control unit (FCU) similar to that in the SIG Sauer P320.

The striker firing system is nearly identical to that in the P320. The short recoil locking system is the SIG Sauer system created by SIG Sauer in 1975 for a Swiss Army contract by the then-existing Swiss Industrial Group (Schweizerische Industrie Gesellschaft, SIG).

The SIG Sauer system improved upon the Petter–Browning system used in the French Modèle 1935A, which SIG had licensed from SACM in 1937 and used in the SIG P210 handgun design, but is not the same system, having been considerably improved upon.

Compared to the SIG Sauer P290, the P365 is slightly larger and has a lighter striker trigger pull of 5.5 to 6.5 lb_{f} (24 to 29 N) versus the P290 at 9 lb_{f} (40 N). The P290RS has a restrike capability, but also has a long double-action only trigger pull. The takedown system is similar to that of the P320, in that a lever is turned down with the slide locked back to release the slide from the frame.

A P365 with its optional 15-round magazine is .46 inches (12 mm) taller than a Glock 19 with its standard 15-round magazine.

== Variants ==
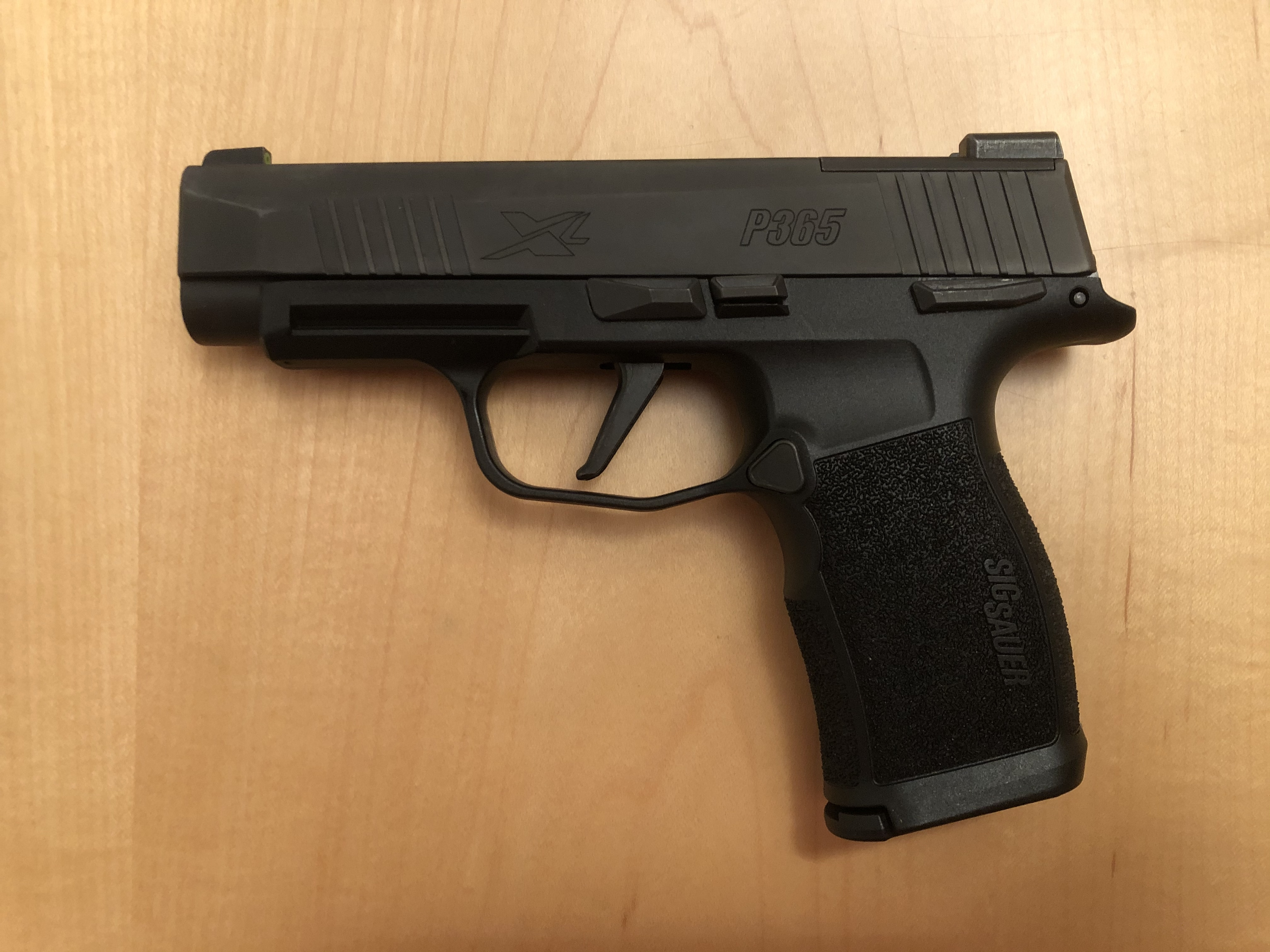
A P365 XL with manual safety and 12-round flush-fit magazine

=== P365 XL ===
In June 2019, the P365 XL was released.

The P365 XL utilizes the same fire control unit (FCU) as the P365, while having a larger grip module that accepts 12-round flush magazines, a flat trigger, and a longer slide and barrel.

The rear sight on the P365 XL slide is removable, to allow a red dot sight to be attached.

The slides and frames of the variants are interchangeable; for example, the longer slide (and barrel) of a P365 XL can be used on a P365 frame and vice versa.

=== P365 SAS ===
In October 2019, a SIG Anti-Snag (SAS) version of the P365 was released.

The SAS variant has an optional ported barrel and slide, no front sight, flush takedown and slide catch levers on the frame, and an embedded and flush fiber optic sight at the rear.

Other than a slight reduction in height, the SAS variant has the same dimensions and weight as the original P365.

=== P365X ===
In 2021, SIG released the P365X, which incorporated many of the features of the P365 XL, including a flat trigger, a removable rear sight which can be substituted for an optic mount, and a longer hand grip which accommodates flush fit 12-round magazines, but without the longer slide.

At launch it was only being sold with the RomeoZero red dot sight preinstalled.

=== P365-380 ===
In February 2022, SIG announced a variant chambered in .380 ACP, available both with and without a manual safety.

=== P365-XMACRO & XMACRO COMP ===
During 2022, SIG introduced a larger variant, branded as XMACRO, with a 17-round capacity and measuring 5.2 inches (13 cm) high and 6.6 inches (17 cm) long and a 3.1-inch (7.9 cm) barrel. SIG renamed the XMACRO to the XMACRO COMP with the release of the new XMACRO, featuring the 17-round grip module with the slide and barrel from the P365 XL.

=== ROSE P365 ===
In January 2023, the P365-XL COMP ROSE and P365-380 ROSE was released. In collaboration with Lena Miculek, ROSE by SIG Sauer is a program designed to encourage and foster a community of female shooters.

=== P365 AXG ===
In October 2023, SIG announced a "Legion" variant of the P365, featuring a grey finish, grip module with grip panels, and pre-installed magazine well (magwell).

It also features a removable plate on the slide (allowing installation of a red dot sight) and ships with three 17-round magazines (where legal).

=== Specifications ===
Specification	P365	P365 SAS	P365 XMACRO COMP	P365 X	P365 XMACRO	P365 XL	P365-380
Barrel Length	3.1 inches (79 mm)				3.7 inches (94 mm)		3.1 inches (79 mm)
Overall Length	5.8 inches (150 mm)		6.6 inches (170mm)	6.0 inches (150 mm)	6.6 inches (170 mm)		5.8 inches (150 mm)
Overall Width	1.0 inch (25 mm)		1.1 inches (28 mm)				1.0 inch (25 mm) (Note: Width of the P365-380 with a manual safety is 1.1 inches (28 mm).)
Height	4.3 inches (110 mm)	4.1 inches (100 mm)	5.2 inches (132 mm)	4.8 inches (120 mm)	5.2 inches (132 mm)	4.8 inches (120 mm)	4.2 inches (110 mm)
Weight	17.8 oz (500 g)		21.5 oz (610 g)	17.8 oz (500 g)	22 oz (624 g)	20.7 oz (590 g)	15.7 oz (450 g)
Capacity (flush-fit) (Note: Capacity is expressed as N+1, where N is the magazine capacity and "+1" represents a round in the chamber.)	10+1 rounds		17+1 rounds	12+1 rounds	17+1 rounds	12+1 rounds	10+1 rounds

=== P365XL Spectre ===
SIG has introduced "Spectre" branded variants of the P365 XL through SIG Custom Works.

The first P365XL Spectre (Note: SIG styles the Custom Works offerings as P365XL Spectre, without a space before the "XL".) was introduced in June 2021 featuring a distressed finish and an X-shaped cutout on top of the slide.

A revised version was introduced in October 2021 that added a gold-colored barrel and skeletonized the flat trigger.

In February 2022, the P365XL Spectre Comp was introduced with an integrated compensator; it also has a gold-colored barrel, but its flat trigger is not skeletonized.

=== P365-FUSE ===
In June 2024, the P365-FUSE was released.

Designed to bridge the gap between compact and full-size carry pistols, the P365-FUSE has an overall length of 7.2" and a 4.3" barrel. The FUSE also comes with two 21-round and one 17-round steel magazines.

The P365-FUSE is currently the newest P365 variant to be released.

=== Compliance-based variants ===
For Massachusetts Attorney General compliance requirements, a model with a manual safety and loaded chamber indicator is available.

Starting in late-2023, a California roster listed model with loaded chamber indicator, magazine disconnect, and manual safety was also released as the SIG 365-9-BXR3P-MS-CA.

In May 2019, the P365-MS, a model with a manual safety, was made generally available.

== Users ==
Country	Organization	Model	References
Denmark	SOKOM	P365	
Denmark	Military police	P365	
Norway	Norwegian Police Service	P365	
Thailand	Royal Thai Police	P365	
United States	Indiana State Police	P365	
United States	Chicago Police Department	P365, P365 XL	
United States	Sumter, South Carolina Police Department	P365	
United States	Pasco County, Florida Police Department	P365	
United States	Hayward, California Police Department	P365	
United States	Miami Beach Police Department	P365	
United States	Michigan State Police	P365	

== Accolades ==
In both 2018 and 2019, it was the best selling handgun in the United States.
