= SIG Sauer P220 =

Swiss-German semi-automatic pistol

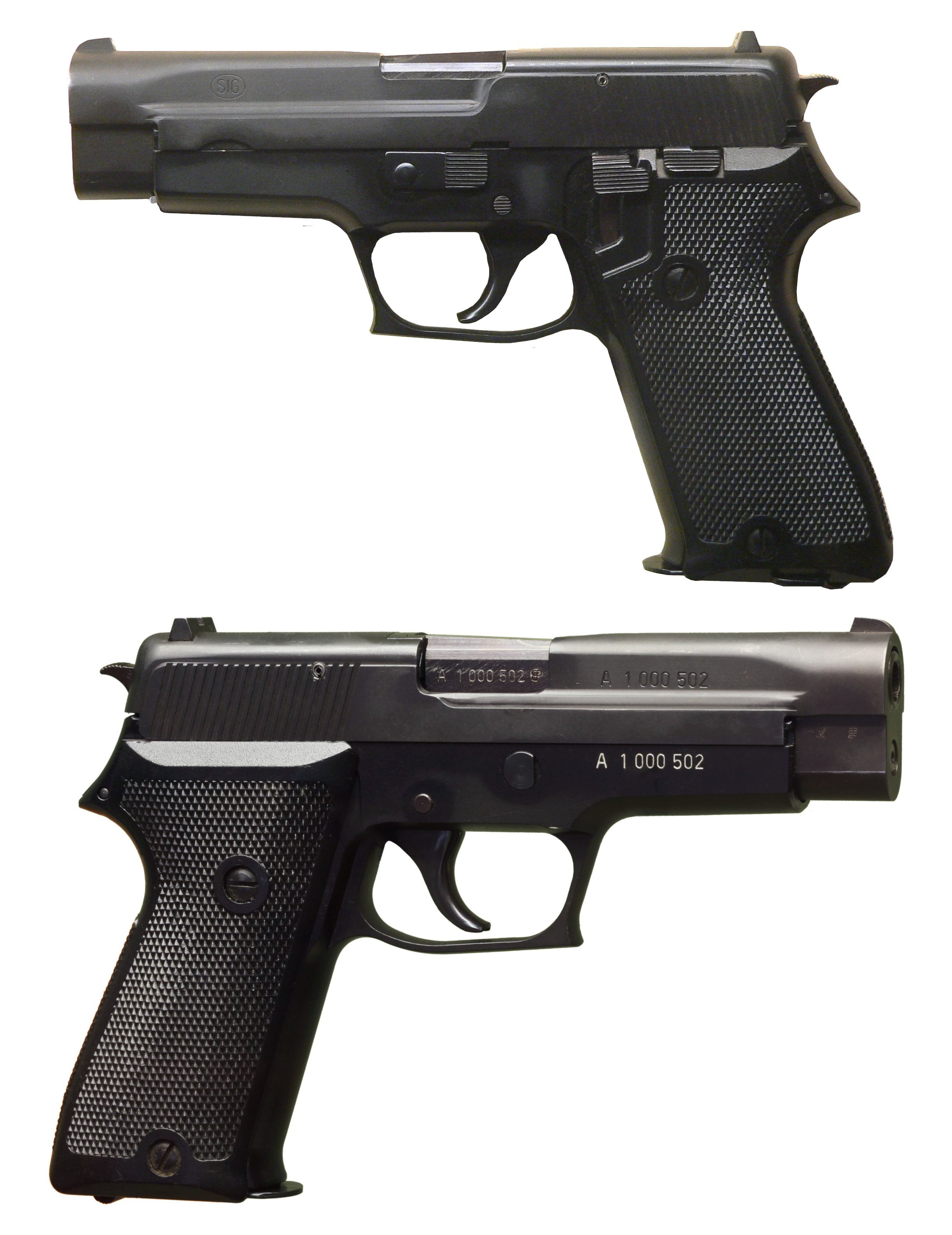
- Original production SIG Sauer P220, features a "heel-mounted" magazine release lever. Two views of the same Swiss Army pistol, on display at Morges castle museum.
- Type: Semi-automatic pistol
- Place of origin: West Germany; Switzerland

Service history
- In service: 1975–present
- Used by: See Users
- Wars: Lebanese Civil War

Production history
- Designer: Walter Ludwig, Hanspeter Sigg, Eduard Brodbeck
- Designed: 1975
- Manufacturer: SIG Sauer
- Variants: See Variants

Specifications
- Mass: 862 g (1.900 lb); 1,130 g (2.49 lb) stainless steel
- Length: 196 mm (7.7 in)
- Barrel length: 112 mm (4.4 in)
- Width: 38 mm (1.5 in)
- Height: 140 mm (5.5 in)
- Cartridge: 9×19mm Parabellum (discontinued); 7.65×21mm Parabellum (discontinued); 9mm Steyr (discontinued); .38 Super (discontinued); 10mm Auto; .45 ACP; .22 LR with conversion kit
- Action: Short recoil operation
- Feed system: 6-round (compact "CCW" models), 7-round (flush to grip), 8-round (current extended basepad for full size P220 models), or 10-round (extended with sleeve) detachable box magazine (in .45 ACP); 9-round magazine in other calibers with the exception of .22lr conversions utilizing a 10-round magazine.

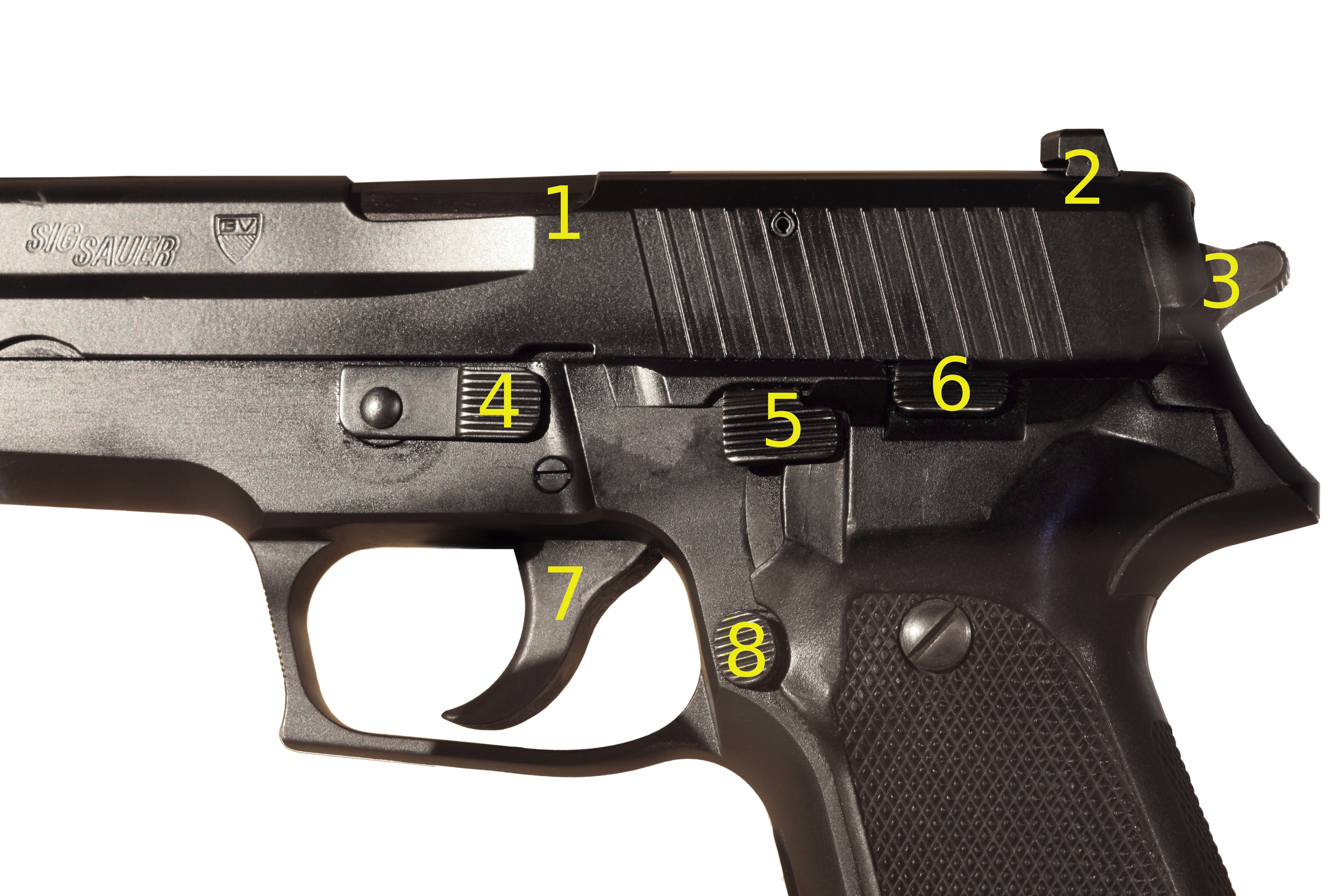
Detail of the controls and parts on a P226, which are identical to most variants of the P220: 1. Ejection port/locking lug, 2. Rear sights, 3. Hammer, 4. Takedown lever, 5. Decocker, 6. Slide stop, 7. Trigger, 8. Magazine release (on some P220s this is located at the bottom of the grip).

The SIG Sauer P220 is a semi-automatic pistol designed in 1975 by the SIG Arms AG division of Schweizerische Industrie Gesellschaft (now SIG Holding AG), and produced by J. P. Sauer & Sohn, in Eckernförde. It is currently manufactured by both SIG Sauer companies: SIG Sauer GmbH, of Eckernförde, Germany; and SIG Sauer, Inc., of New Hampshire, United States.

== History ==
Not to be confused with SIG P210 series, which licensed the Petter-Browning system from SACM of France in 1938, the SIG Sauer P220 was developed for release in 1975 for the Swiss Army as a replacement for the SIG P210, which had been developed during World War II; in service it is known as "Pistole 75" (P75). For the commercial production and distribution of the P220, SIG partnered with J.P. Sauer & Sohn of Germany, thus, the P220 and all subsequent pistols from SIG and J.P. Sauer & Sohn are properly known as SIG Sauer pistols.

In 1975, Switzerland became the first nation to officially adopt the P220 as the "Pistole 75" (P75) chambered in 9 mm Parabellum. Other nations to adopt it for military use include Japan (general issue) and Denmark (which has the earlier P210 in general issue) only to special forces. It was followed by the SIG Sauer P226, incorporating a double stack magazine.

Upon completion of their military service, all Swiss soldiers can obtain ownership of their ordnance weapon for a nominal fee; in particular commissioned officers and soldiers of the medical forces of the Swiss armed forces can obtain ownership of their P220 service pistols by paying an administrative fee of thirty Swiss francs.

In the United States this handgun was originally sold in a modified form as the Browning BDA from 1977 to 1980.

== Design ==
The P220 was developed in 1975 by SIG and produced and distributed by J.P. Sauer & Sohn. A new locking system which is known as the SIG Sauer system was introduced as well as a number of other innovations. This nomenclature is found on the Browning BDA version of the P220 sold from 1975.

The SIG P220 is recoil operated using the SIG Sauer system. Instead of the locking lugs and recesses milled into the barrel and slide of Browning-derived weapons such as the Colt M1911A1, Browning Hi-Power and CZ 75, the P220 variants (and many other modern pistols) lock the barrel and slide together using an enlarged breech section on the barrel locking into the ejection port. After firing the round, the slide and barrel move back a few millimeters together, then the chamber is pulled downwards by the cam surface and thus unlocked by the slide, which covers the remaining distance on its own due to its inertia. The recoil spring moves the slide forward again, inserting a new cartridge from the magazine into the chamber and cocking the trigger. The barrel is lifted out of the control gate and locks in the case ejection port.

The slide of the P220 series is a heavy-gauge sheet metal stamping with a welded-on nose section incorporating an internal barrel bushing. The breech block portion is a machined insert attached to the slide by means of a roll pin visible from either side. The frame is of forged alloy with a hard-anodized coating. The SIG P220 series incorporates a hammer-drop lever to the rear of the trigger on the left side, which first appeared on the Sauer 38H before World War II. After chambering a round, the hammer will be cocked, so for safe carriage the hammer drop is actuated with the thumb, dropping the hammer in a safe manner.

The double action / single action (DA/SA) trigger design of the P220 is also a SIG Sauer innovation similar to the J.P. Sauer & Sohn 38H pistol. Further design refinements include a hammer decocking lever and positive firing pin block safety.

The P220 also features an automatic firing pin block safety which is activated by the trigger mechanism, similar to the one used in the Czech CZ-038 from the period after the Second World War. The pistol may now be holstered, and can be fired without actuating any other controls. The first shot will be fired in double-action mode, unless the user chooses to manually cock the hammer. Double-action trigger pressure is measured at approximately 12–14 pounds, with subsequent shots being fired in single-action mode with a lighter trigger pressure of approximately 6 pounds. There is no separate safety lever to manipulate; the hammer drop is the only manual safety device. As with other double-action pistols such as the Walther P38 and Beretta 92F, some training is required to minimize the difference caused by the different trigger pressure between the first double-action shot and subsequent single-action shots when the hammer is cocked by the rearward movement of the slide.

SIG Sauer refers to their safety systems as a Four Point System. The four types of safety are:

1. the de-cocker, which allows the shooter to lower the hammer safely, while there is a round in the chamber. When the de-cocking occurs, the hammer is lowered but it still stays away from the firing pin.
2. the safety notch, prevents the hammer from striking the firing pin accidentally.
3. the firing pin has its own safety, which makes sure that the pin will not move forward. That is, until the trigger is pulled, at which time the safety is removed and the pin is pushed forward to meet the cartridge's primer. This third safety is also the gun's drop safety. Even when dropped from a reasonable height, with a round in the chamber, the gun will not fire.
4. the slide has a notch, which separates the firing pin from the cartridge. Unlike the aforementioned firing pin safety, this one is there to make sure that the gun does not accidentally discharge a round while it is cycling. This is called the "trigger bar disconnector".

Despite these safety measures, the Sig Sauer P220 has been cited in accidental fatalities. One example is the case of Officer Jesse Paderez of the San Fernando Police Department, California. On 17 July 2002, he was "accidentally shot and killed when his Sig P220, .45 caliber service weapon, fell to the ground and discharged, striking him in the head. He had gone to the police station to pick up a patrol car...as he walked across the parking lot, his weapon, still in its holster, fell to the ground and discharged when the hammer struck the pavement."

== Variants ==
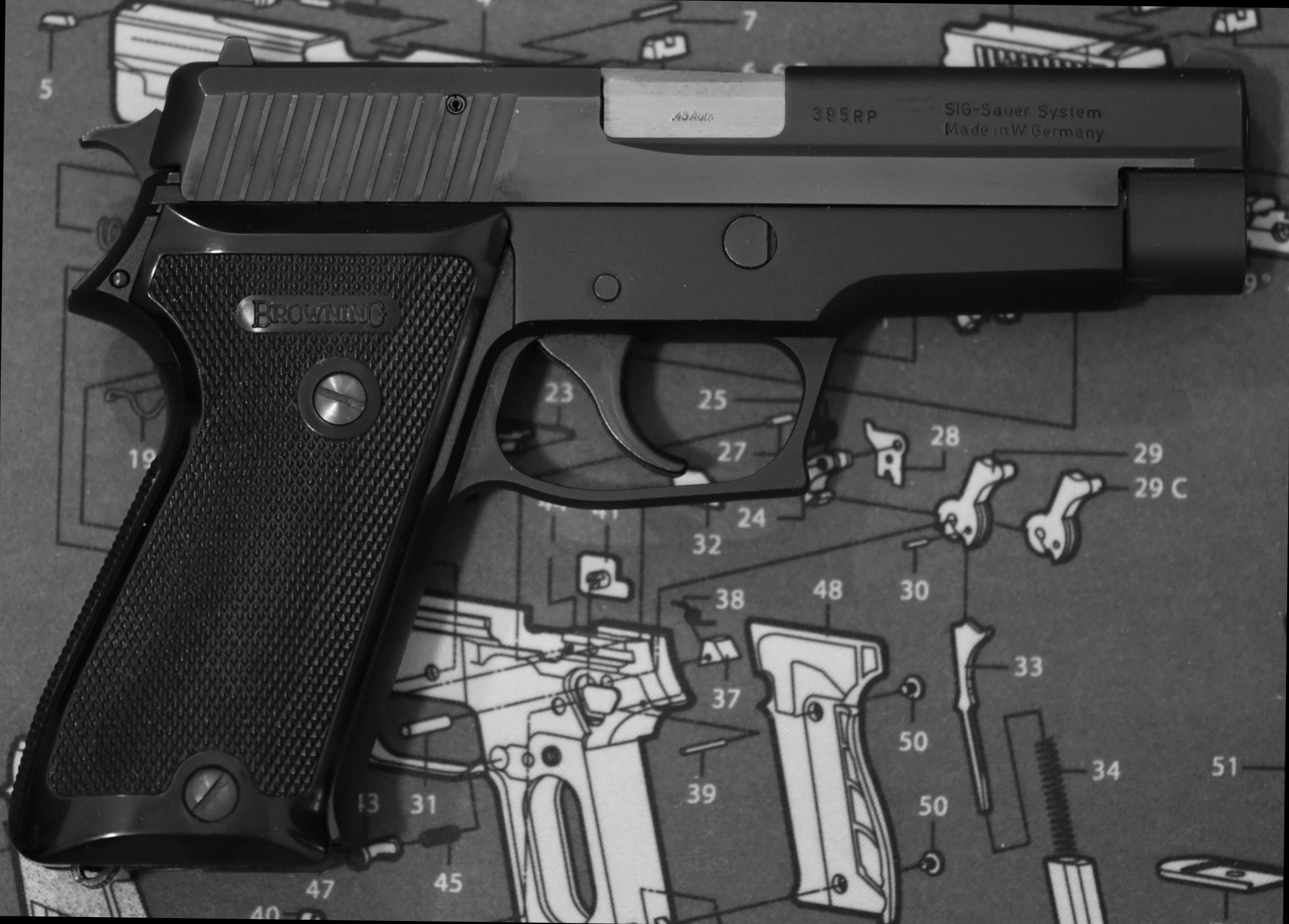
Browning BDA 45, an early American import of P220 sold by Browning Arms Company, with "SIG Sauer System" on the slide

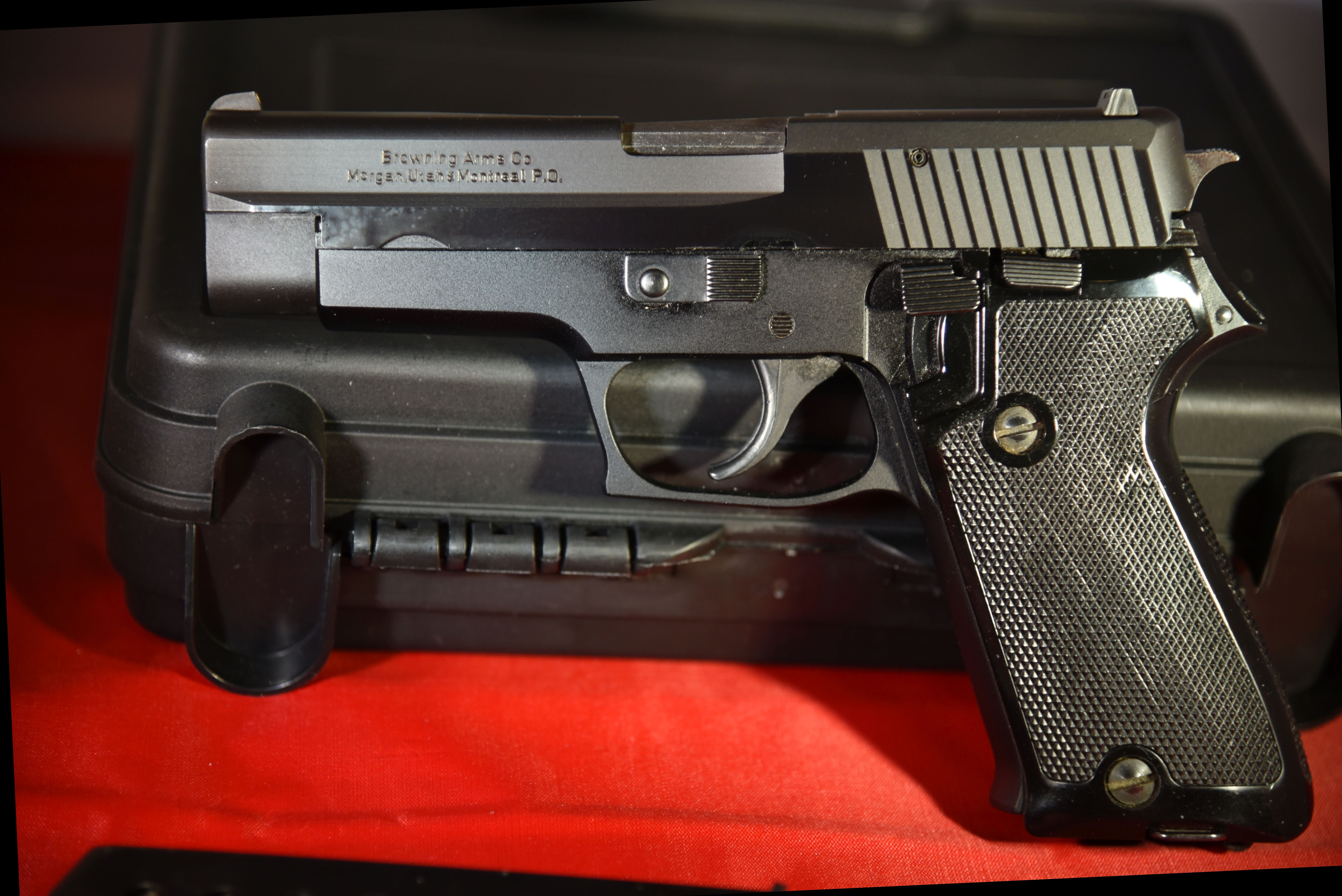
Browning BDA .45 ACP caliber left side showing Browning branding

The original 1975 SIG Sauer P220 had a 'heel-mounted' magazine release lever located at the rear of the magazine well and a lanyard loop which was typical of handguns made for police and military purposes. Newer SIG P220s utilize a push button magazine release to the left side of the grip, behind the trigger and do not have lanyard loops. The P220 was then later modified with a redesigned slide, grips, and other minor changes to the frame.

In 2007, a Picatinny rail was added to the frame under the barrel as standard on all models whose number ends in R. The major difference in slide design, between the older model SIG pistols and the current production, is that the older model slides were stamped whereas the current production models are milled on a CNC machine. The stamped models have an end piece at the muzzle end which is welded in place, to complete the slide. Additionally, the older stamped slides feature a removable breech block. This breech block is pinned to the slide with two hollow roll pins, one pressed inside the other, with their split ends opposed. The newer milled slides are a one-piece unit and do not have a removable breech block.

The SIG P220 also comes in P220R and P220ST versions. Also in 2019 a new variant is available called the P220R Hunter that is chambered in 10mm and factory coated with a KRYPTEC camo pattern. The base and R models have an aluminum alloy frame with a stainless steel slide (if made by SIG Sauer in the US; German made versions still use a blued, stamped steel slide); the ST model has a stainless steel frame and slide. The R and ST models also have a Picatinny rail, beneath the slide and barrel, allowing for fitting of accessories such as lights or laser sights.

Originally, all SIG P220s were DA/SA and featured a decocking lever (and no external safety) just forward of the slide catch. This changed with the introduction of double-action only (DAO), Double Action Kellerman (DAK), and single action (SA) models. The DAO and DAK models do not have a de-cocking lever or safety, and the SA models only feature an M1911 style external safety. SIG has also introduced the SAS (SIG Anti-Snag) model—which is dehorned, has no accessory rail, and is designed for concealed carry—and the Elite model, which includes the new short-reset trigger, a beavertail grip, front strap grip checkering, and front slide cocking serrations.

All modern P220 variants are available in .45 ACP and, as of January 2015, 10mm Auto.

=== Browning BDA (early American import) ===
The P220 was initially imported to the United States as the Browning Double Action (BDA) (Note: At the time SIG Sauer did not have a presence in the USA) and then as the Sigarms P220. The P220s sold under the Browning Arms Company marque in the United States c. 1977–1980 had the heel-mounted magazine release lever until Browning discontinued it from its product line in the early 1980s; the discontinuation from the Browning product lineup was due to its poor sales and its then-'space age' appearance (similar to the AR-15/M16).

These particular P220s (or Browning BDAs) will have the stamping scroll which reads 'Browning Arms Company Morgan, Utah and Montreal PQ' on the left hand side of the slide and 'SIG-Sauer System Made in W. Germany' on the right-hand side with the serial number scrolled beneath.

The Browning version has the sides of the slides polished and blued. The frame is aluminum. The handgrips have Browning on the right side only. On the right side of the slide is the serial number. The Browning BDA 45 shown in the photographs has a production series number starting with 395. The RP that follows shows that this particular handgun was manufactured in 1977.

It was offered for sale in .45 ACP, 9 mm, .38 Super (a rare model) and 7.65mm Parabellum (an even rarer model).

Some units were adopted by Huntington Beach Police.

=== P220 Rail ===
The P220 Rail (or P220R) is effectively the same as the P220, but comes with an accessory rail located on the forward end of the frame of the firearm for accepting accessories such as a weapon light or laser. While the provided rail is similar to the Mil-STD-1913 Picatinny rail design, as implemented by SIG for this gun it has a proprietary cross-section form that conflicts with some early design Picatinny-compatible equipment. The P220R with its rail became the standard configuration of most recent and current production P220s which are no longer differentiated by the "Rail" or "R" designation.

=== P220 Carry ===
A P220 with a shortened barrel (3.9") and slide, but a full-sized frame that accepted 8-round magazines. It was available in DA/SA, SA, and DAK variants. All models, with the exception of the SAS concealed-carry version, came with an accessory rail. A Legion Series version was also offered. As of 2023 the P220 Carry is discontinued.

=== P220 Compact ===
A P220 with shortened barrel and slide (3.9") and compact frame that accepts 6-round magazines. It is possible to use the 8-round magazines of the P220 and P220 Carry which give it an 8+1 capacity. Adapters are available to cover the portion of the magazine which protrudes from the bottom of the grip. It was offered in four versions: blued with beavertail, stainless (two-tone) with beavertail, blued with rail (no beavertail) and stainless with rail (no beavertail). It served as a replacement for the discontinued P245 and addressed complaints about the P220 Carry's full-size frame in a concealed carry pistol. The 220 Compact has since been discontinued.

=== P220 Combat ===
The two "Combat" models, the P220 Combat and P220 Combat TB (Threaded Barrel), are available in DA/SA only. Their frames are colored "Flat Dark Earth" in compliance with the Combat Pistol program. The Combat model comes with night sights, a Nitron-finished slide and barrel, phosphated internals, and a Picatinny rail. The TB model features an extra 0.6" on the barrel, and external threads to accept a suppressor. The P220 Combat is chambered only in .45 ACP, and is supplied with one 8-round magazine and one extended 10-round magazine.

=== P220 ST ===
A version of the SIG P220 handgun made by SIG Sauer with a reversible magazine release, stainless steel slide, and stainless steel frame. Changing to a stainless steel frame from the lighter alloy frame normally used is meant to reduce felt recoil. The ST models are typically bare stainless (all "silver"), though SIG Sauer has produced Nitron finished (all "black") ST versions for police department trial and evaluation (T&E) guns.

=== P220 Classic 22 ===
This model's primary purpose is as a practice or range pistol. The Classic 22 model replaces the typical stainless steel centerfire slide assembly with a lighter aluminum rimfire slide chambered in .22 LR. The Classic 22 also has a different barrel, guide rod, and recoil spring than the larger caliber models. It incorporates the same frame and operation as centerfire P220 models. The Classic 22 model is available as a stand-alone firearm or as a conversion kit to an existing centerfire P220. Likewise, conversion kits (the SIG Sauer X-Change Kits) exist to convert a .22 LR P220 into .45 ACP. The conversion can be accomplished by field stripping the firearm and replacing the slide assembly and magazine—a process that can be accomplished in minutes.

The Classic 22 use a 10-round polymer magazine in lieu of the steel magazines used by the centerfire models and conversion kits.

The P220 Classic 22 should not be confused with the SIG Sauer Mosquito .22 LR pistol. The Classic 22 is a full-sized P220 while the Mosquito is modeled on the P226 but is 90% of the size. Another difference is that the Classic 22 is manufactured by SIG Sauer while the Mosquito is made under license by German Sport Guns GmbH. The size difference means that the Mosquito cannot be converted "up", and full-size SIG Sauer pistols cannot use the Mosquito's slide assembly.

=== P220 Legion ===
A variant offered in SIG's high-end Legion Series, the P220 Legion features several improvements and upgrades over the base model including signature Legion gray PVD coating, G-10 grips with Legion medallion, low profile controls, X-RAY3 sights, and an optics-cut slide for mounting a red dot sight (in later production). The frame is modified from the base model with a reduced and contoured beaver tail, an undercut trigger guard, and front slide serrations. The P220 Legion is offered in DA/SA and SAO. Beginning in 2017, a 10mm version is also offered. A limited edition P220 Legion Carry SAO was released in 2020, but was only produced in small numbers before being discontinued.

=== P225 / P225-A1 ===
SIG Sauer P225 / P225-A1
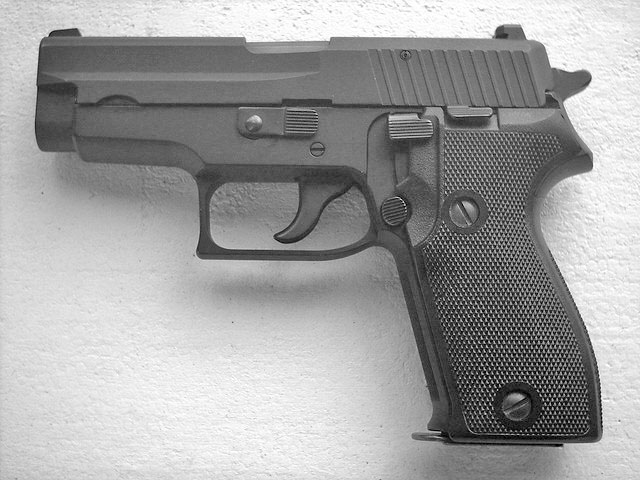
- SIG Sauer P225 pistol
- Type: Semi-automatic pistol
- Place of origin: Germany, Switzerland (P225); United States (P225-A1)

Service history
- Used by: See Users

Production history
- Designer: Theobald Förster, Jürgen Baumann
- Designed: 1978 (P225)
- Manufacturer: SIG Sauer, Eckernförde, Germany; SIG Sauer Inc. Exeter, NH, USA
- Produced: 2015–2019 (P225-A1)
- Variants: P6 (West German police variant)

Specifications
- Mass: 30.5 oz (860 g)
- Length: 6.9 in (180 mm)
- Barrel length: 3.6 in (91 mm)
- Width: 1.26 in (32 mm)
- Height: 5.2 in (130 mm)
- Cartridge: 9×19mm Parabellum
- Caliber: 9mm
- Action: Mechanically locked, recoil-operated (DA/SA)
- Feed system: 8-round magazine
- Sights: Siglite

The SIG P225 is a more compact version of the SIG P220. A new German police standard issued in the mid-1970s prompted SIG-Sauer, Heckler & Koch, and Walther to develop new pistols that met the standard: the Walther P5, the SIG-Sauer P225 (known as the P6) and the Heckler & Koch P7. (In addition, Mauser had a design, the HsP, that never went into full production.) Walter Ludwig was involved in the design of the Walther, SIG-Sauer and Mauser entrants in the German Police selection. Each German state was free to buy whichever pistol it wanted to. Initially, the P220 was submitted; the P225/P6 was a revision created to conform with the mid-1970s West German police requirements for its standard service pistol. The SIG-Sauer P225 was the least expensive (due mainly to the inventive design) and received the majority of the orders. To be able to manufacture that many handguns, SIG acquired a controlling interest in J. P. Sauer & Sohn in Eckernförde, Germany to manufacture parts for the P220. This is also where all P225s were manufactured. The only difference between the P6 and P225—the P225 (which was adopted by US civilian law enforcement) has a lighter trigger pull, whereas the P6's trigger pull is heavier. The P225 has tritium fixed sights; P6s had fixed sights only. Genuine P225s manufactured for the West German Police will have a "P6" stamp on the right side of the slide.

A new police standard was adopted in Germany in 1995, and the P225 is in the process of being replaced. German police pistols can be identified by the hammer, which has a small "ear" or "hook". According to section 7.7 of the German manual, the cutout is the Deformationssporn, which means "deformation spur". This was a requirement of the West German Police for all their P6 pistols, to alert police armorers if the pistol was dropped on its hammer. Many of these surplus German police pistols were imported into the United States. Because of its compact size, the P225/P6 is quite readily usable for concealed carry. In states with limits on magazine capacity, the P225/P6 was usually in high demand. Most have a push button magazine release located behind the triggerguard, though they (but not the later P225-A1) were also available with a heel-mounted magazine release lever as used on the original P220, which was not a popular feature in the American marketplace as it makes magazine changes slower even though it greatly reduces the chances of an accidental magazine release. The heel-mounted magazine release lever also reduces the incidence of lost magazines in combat as a result of speed reloading magazines, as is common with the push button magazine release which only requires the user to push this button to eject the magazine rather than drag it out by hand as one must do with the heel-mounted magazine release lever.

P225-A1

P225-A1 was introduced by SIG in 2015. It was based on the P225, with a number of refinements. Notably, the place of origin on the slide was SIG Sauer Inc. of Exeter, New Hampshire. There was a new contour to the frame, a short reset trigger, a milled slide (the earlier one was stamped), and two barrel lengths (one standard and the other threaded for a suppressor). The suppressor model came with high sights. The P225-A1 was discontinued in late 2019.

=== P245 ===
The SIG P245 variant is chambered only in .45 ACP (hence the name) and was developed primarily for the US market as a civilian's concealed sidearm, or as a police backup weapon. The SIG P245 has a reversible magazine release giving the user the choice of operating it with their left or right thumb. It normally takes 6-round magazines, but can also accept the 7-, 8-, or 10-round magazines designed for the P220. A grip extender is available for use with these longer magazines. One of the major differences in construction between the P245 and the P220 Compact is that the P245 was only built using the older stamped steel slide design with a removable breech block, while some of the later P220 Compact variants were available with an extended grip tang.

The P245 is no longer manufactured by SIG, having been replaced by the P220 Carry and the P220 Compact.

== Users ==
- Canada: P225 variant is used by the Royal Canadian Navy and the Canadian Forces Military Police.
- Denmark: P220 variant
- France: P220 variant
- Iran
- Japan: Adopted by the Japanese Self-Defense Forces in 1982 and made under license by Minebea as the Minebea P9.
- Serbia: Some number in arsenal of Gendarmery.
- Sweden: Standard service handgun of the Swedish Police. They are being replaced by Glock pistols starting in 2022.
- Switzerland: Standard service handgun of the Swiss Army, designated Pistole 75. The P225 is also used by various police forces.
- United States: The P220, among other pistols, is used by the park rangers of the National Park Service and some local and state police departments, such as the Irvine Police Department and the Connecticut State Police. The P225 is used by various police departments.
- Uruguay
- Vatican City: P75 (P220) is used by the Swiss Guard.
- West Germany: P225 variant was used by the West German police as the P6.

== Images ==
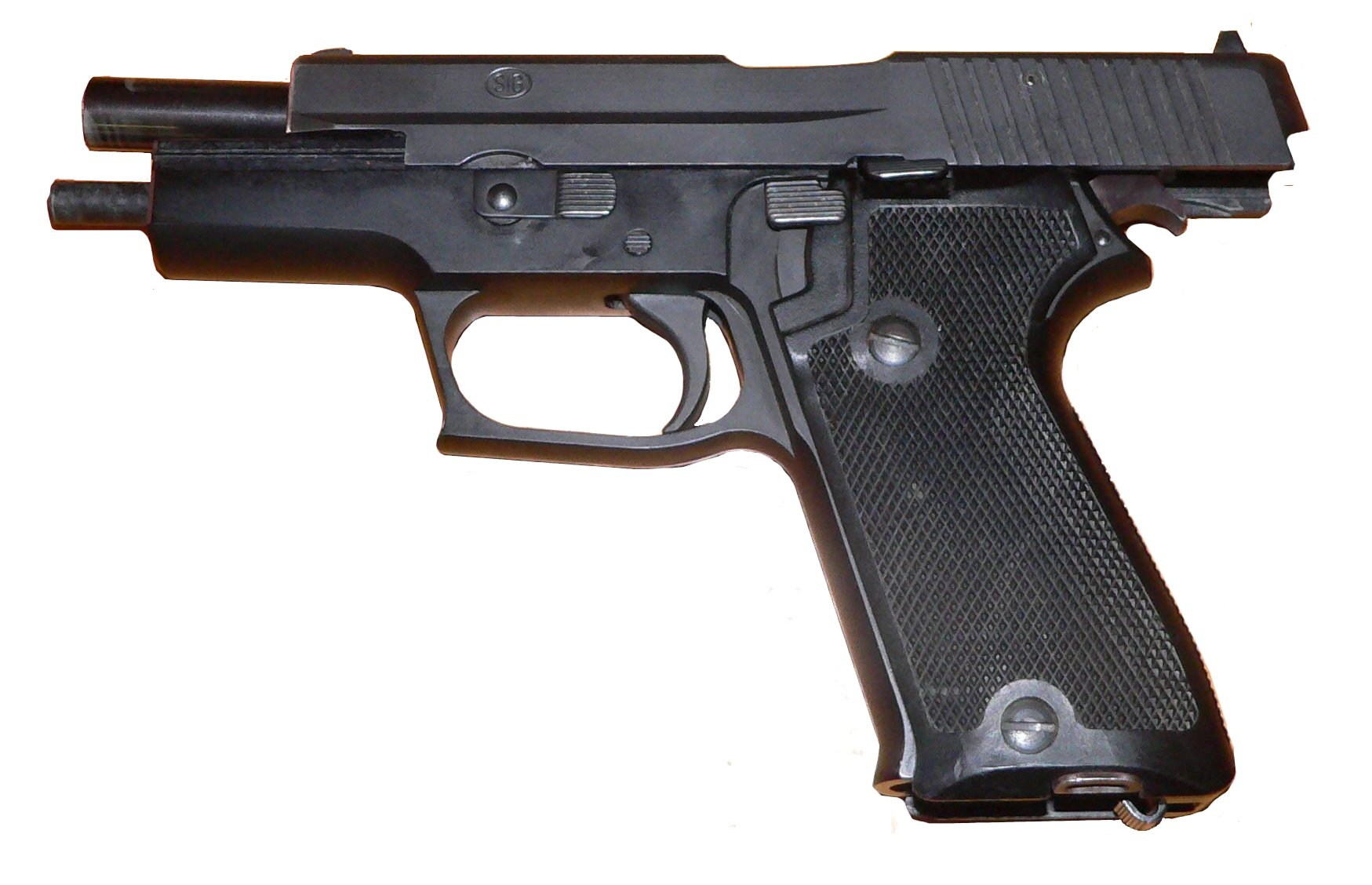
The P220 (P75 in the picture), like this Swiss military model, does not feature an external safety.

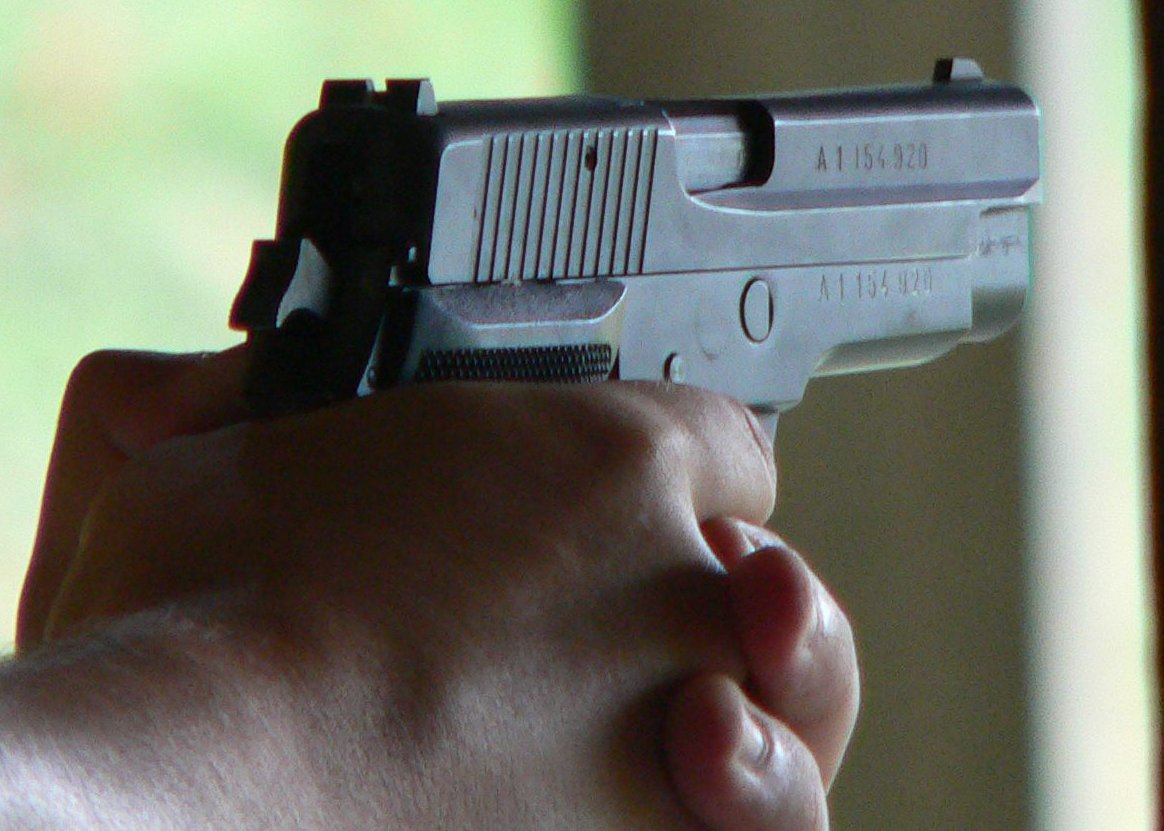
Firing of a military P220 (P75)
