= Pistolet automatique modèle 1935A =

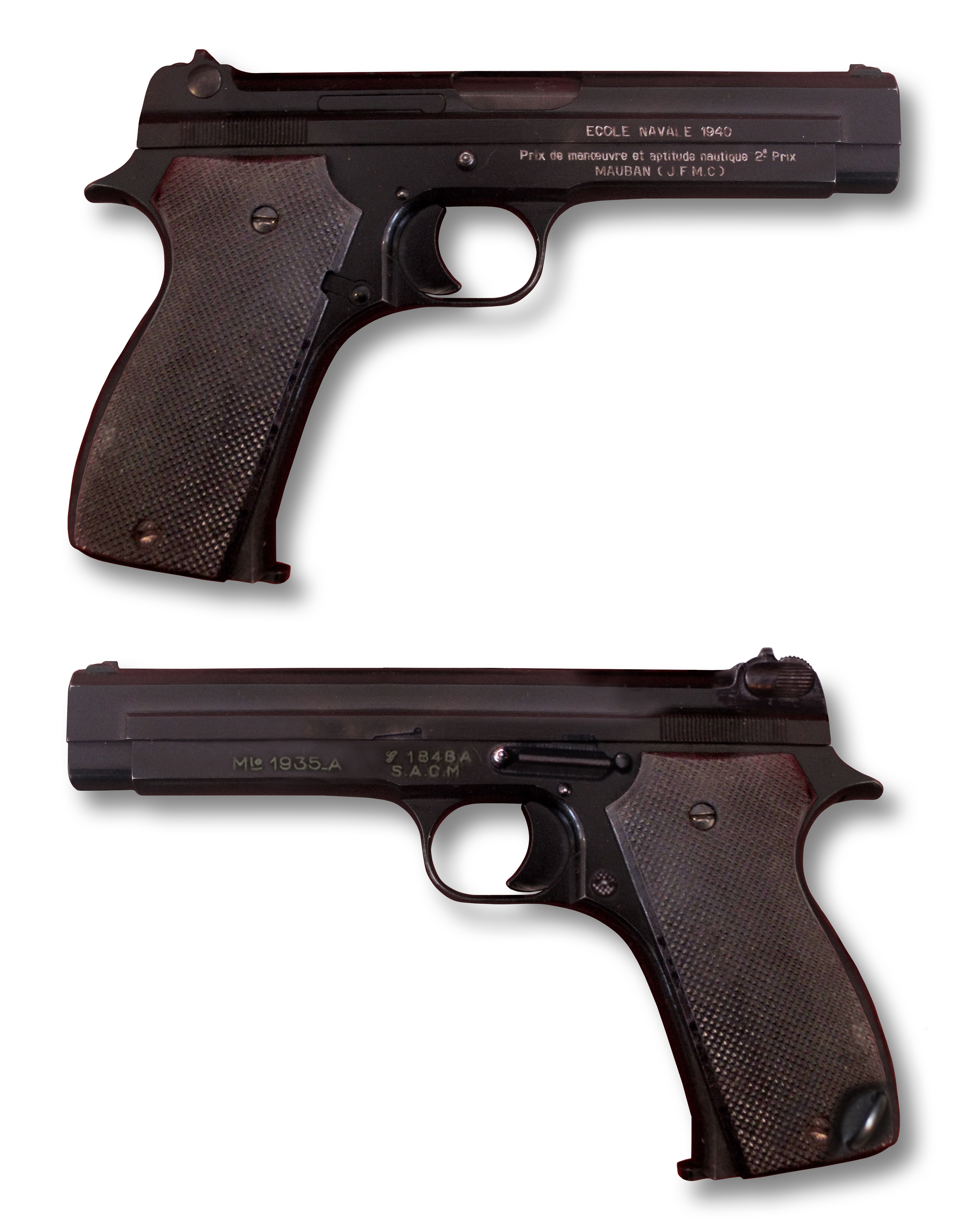
- Modèle 1935A pistol
- Type: Semi-automatic pistol
- Place of origin: France

Service history
- In service: 1937–1960s
- Used by: See Users
- Wars: World War II; First Indochina War; Algerian War; Vietnam War; Laotian Civil War; Cambodian Civil War

Production history
- Designer: Charles Petter
- Designed: 1935
- Manufacturer: Société Alsacienne de Constructions Mécaniques (SACM)
- Produced: 1937–1956
- No. built: 84,000

Specifications
- Mass: 730 g (1.61 lb)
- Length: 7.75 in (197 mm)
- Barrel length: 4.29 in (109 mm)
- Height: 4.96 in (126 mm)
- Cartridge: 7.65×20mm Longue
- Action: Short recoil
- Muzzle velocity: 345 metres per second (1,130 ft/s)
- Feed system: 8-round magazine

The Pistolet automatique modèle 1935A (Automatic Pistol Model 1935A, also known as the Modèle 1935A, French Model 1935A, or M1935A) commonly known by the abbreviation the SACM pistol, is a semi-automatic pistol designed by Charles Petter, chambered for the 7.65mm Longue cartridge. It was developed to compete in the 1935–1937 French military trials conducted by the Commission d’Experiences Techniques de Versailles to select a new sidearm.

== Description ==
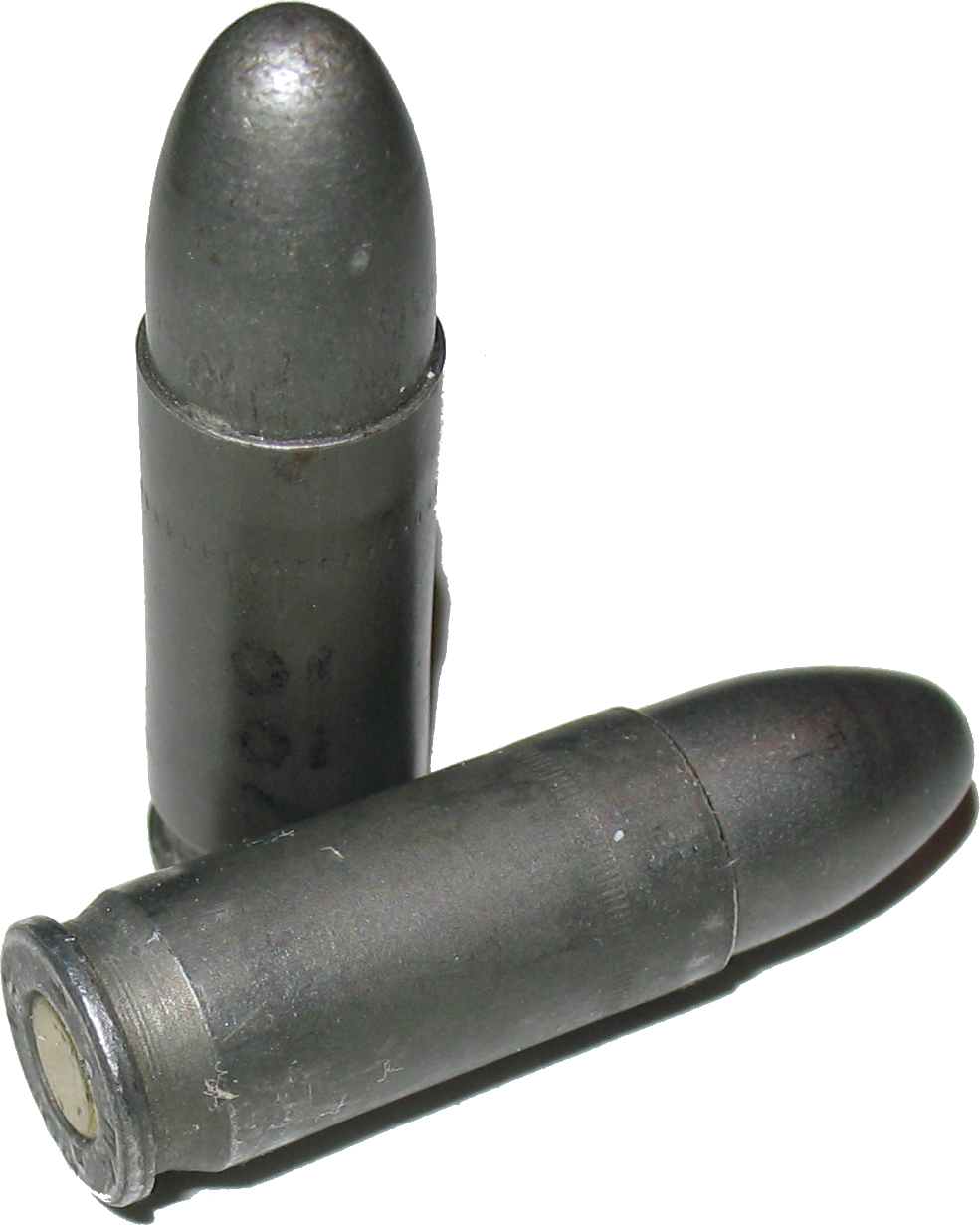
7.65 mm Longue cartridges

The Pistolet automatique modèle 1935A was developed by the Swiss-born Charles Petter, a former captain in the French Foreign Legion and an engineer of the French company Société Alsacienne de Constructions Mécaniques (SACM). Petter designed a pistol which had some of the same design elements as John Browning's M1911 pistol, such as the grooved slide and barrel which interlocked and recoiled together until a pivoting link lowered the barrel, thus unlocking the assembly and further rearward movement of the barrel and slide together, which after reaching the point of greatest movement would be returned to battery. Along the way, the slide would strip a cartridge from the magazine and push it into the chamber just prior to the under barrel link forcing the barrel up into engagement with the slide, locking the action. Petter eliminated the barrel bushing and used a full-length spring guide which had the effect of removing one of the elements of inaccuracy from the M1911 design and increased functional reliability. Petter's design was chambered for the 7.65mm Long cartridge.

The pistol won the 1935–1937 competition to produce the new French military sidearm; a different pistol in the competition was the similarly named Pistolet automatique modèle 1935S. Initial production of the 1935A began in 1937, and the pistol began delivery to the French Army in late 1939, with a total of about 10,700 pistols built before German forces occupied the SACM factory in the summer of 1940. The Germans continued production of the 1935A, now designated the "Pistole 625 (f)", with about 23,850 pistols made for the German forces. Following the end of the German occupation of France in 1944, SACM resumed production of the 1935A for the French military, making a further 50,400 pistols. In total, about 84,950 1935A pistols were produced between October 1937 and February 1950.

A unique feature of the system was an integrated fire control system. The trigger, hammer, mainspring, and sear assembly were contained in one unit. Petter's design impressed the Swiss company Schweizerische Industrie Gesellschaft (now known as SIG Group); in 1937, they purchased a license from SACM in order to produce their model 47/8 handgun, which became the SIG P210.

== Users ==
- France: Used also by French protectorates
- Vichy France: After the Fall of France many pistols fell into Vichy French hands.
- Germany: Mle 1935A designated the Pistole 625(f)
- Viet Cong: Mle 1935A
- (Khmer Republic) FANK: 381 in inventory as of 1 April 1972.
