= Charles Petter =

Swiss firearms designer (1880–1953)

- Born: March 26, 1880; Lavey-Morcles, Switzerland
- Died: July 7, 1953 (aged 73); Montreux, Switzerland
- Occupation: Engineer
- Known for: French Model 1935A pistol

Charles Gabriel Petter (26 March 1880 – 7 July 1953) was a Swiss firearms designer. He is best known as the designer of the Pistolet automatique modèle 1935A (also known as the Modèle 1935A, French Model 1935A, or M1935A). He also designed a submachine gun that was patented and formally adopted into French service in 1939, but never produced.

== Biography ==
Born in Lavey-Morcles, Petter studied mechanical engineering in Bern and was a lieutenant in the infantry of the Swiss Army. He became an employee of Krupp in Essen, Germany. During World War I, he served in the French Foreign Legion, where he obtained French citizenship and the rank of captain.

Petter received two French decorations, the Croix de Guerre and membership in the Legion of Honour. He was made a French citizen by presidential decree in 1916. Subsequently, he was director of the French branch of the Belgian company Armes Automatiques Lewis and consultant of the Société Alsacienne de Constructions Mécaniques (SACM) in Cholet.

=== Private life ===
Petter was married twice, in 1909 to Louise Marguerite Paule Charavet, and in 1926 to Xenia Schegloff. His second marriage produced two daughters, Elizabeth and Hélène. He died in Montreux in 1953.

== Petter–Browning system ==
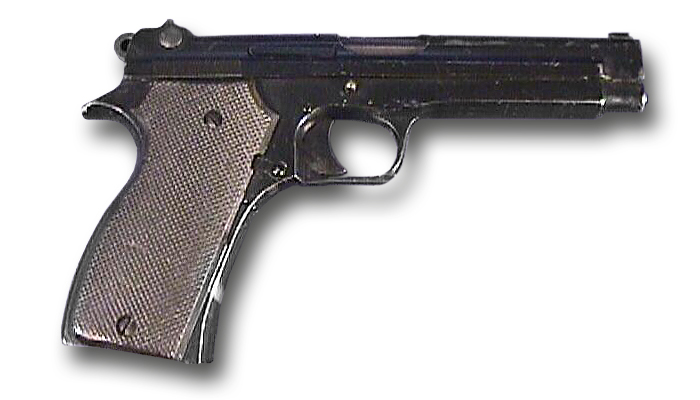
French Model 1935A pistol

The Petter–Browning system (alternately the Browning–Petter or Browning–Petter–SIG system) of breechblocks is named after John Browning and Petter. Petter designed the French Model 1935A pistol, which had some of the same design elements as Browning's M1911 pistol, such as the grooved slide and barrel which interlocked and recoiled together until a pivoting link lowered the barrel, thus unlocking the assembly and further rearward movement of the barrel and slide together, which after reaching the point of greatest movement would be returned to battery. Along the way, the slide would strip a cartridge from the magazine and push it into the chamber just prior to the under barrel link forcing the barrel up into engagement with the slide, locking the action. Petter eliminated the barrel bushing and used a full length spring guide which had the effect of removing some of the inaccuracy from the M1911 design and increased functional reliability.

A unique feature of the system was an integrated fire control system. The trigger, hammer, mainspring, and sear assembly were contained in one unit. His design impressed SIG of Switzerland, which licensed it in order to produce their model 47/8 handgun, which became the SIG Sauer P210. Petter's French patent FR 782914 (Swiss: CH 185452, U.S. patent 2,139,203) was acquired in 1937 by SIG and used for the P210.
