= Brügger =

Brugger or Brügger may refer to:

- Brügger (surname)
- Brügger Colibri and MB-3 Colibri, a family of Swiss small sports aircraft
- Brügger & Thomet (B&T or B+T), licensed Swiss defense supplier
- Brügger & Thomet APR (Advanced Precision Rifle), family of Swiss sniper rifles
- Brügger & Thomet GL-06, stand-alone shoulder-firing non-lethal weapon
- Brügger & Thomet MP9 (Machine Pistol 9mm), machine pistol
- Brügger & Thomet VP9 (Veterinary Pistol 9mm), bolt action suppressed pistol

== See also ==
- Bruegger's
- Brøgger
- Brügge
- Prugger
- Brüggen (disambiguation)
