= CBJ =

CBJ may refer to:

- CBJ-FM, a French-language Canadian radio station
- cbj (publisher), a German publisher
- Cameron Borthwick-Jackson, an English professional footballer
- Cheek by Jowl, a UK theatre company
- Brazilian Judo Confederation, or Confederação Brasileira de Judô
- Central Bank of Jordan, the central bank of Jordan
- Christian Bookstore Journal, a trade magazine
- Clive Barker's Jericho, a supernatural horror-themed first person shooter video game
- Columbus Blue Jackets, a professional ice hockey team based in Columbus, Ohio
- City and Borough of Juneau (CBJ), the unified municipality of Juneau, Alaska located on the Gastineau Channel
- Cabo Rojo Airport (IATA code: CBJ), Caribbean coastal airport in the Dominican Republic
- Country Bear Jamboree, an attraction at the Magic Kingdom in the Walt Disney World Resort and at Tokyo Disneyland
- Cyclone Business Jet, an undergraduate student organization designing and constructing a prototype 10-passenger airplane
- Saab Bofors Dynamics CBJ-MS, a Swedish PDW/submachine gun
- 6.5×25mm CBJ, a firearms cartridge that can be used in the Saab Bofors Dynamics CBJ-MS
