= Brügger & Thomet APC =

B&T APC
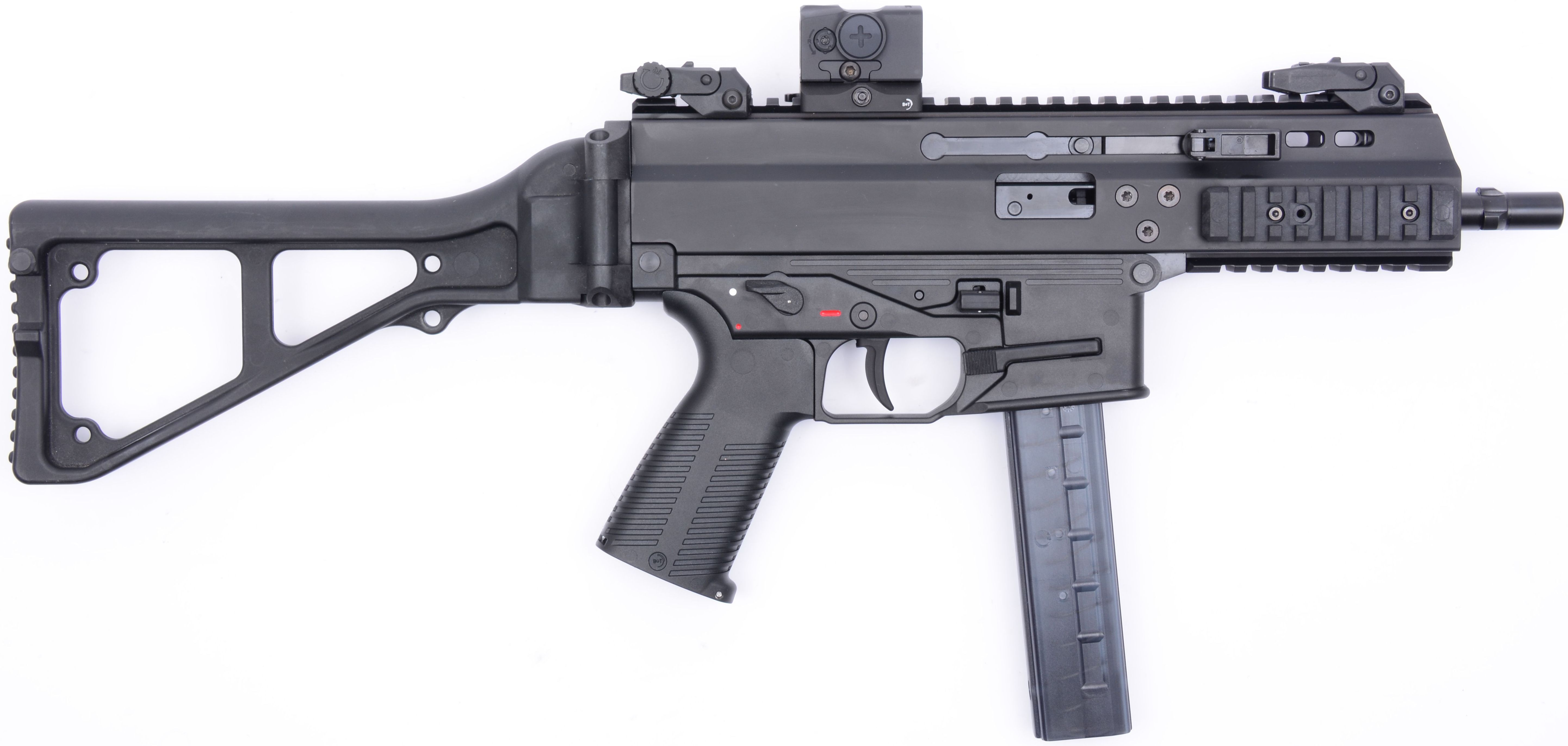
- B&T APC9 PRO
- Type: Submachine gun Assault rifle (APC556), (APC300); Battle rifle (APC308)
- Place of origin: Switzerland

Service history
- In service: 2011–present
- Wars: Russian invasion of Ukraine

Production history
- Designer: B&T
- Designed: 2010
- Manufacturer: B&T
- Produced: 2011—present

Specifications
- Mass: 2.5 kg (5.5 lb) with empty 30-round box magazine and red dot sight
- Length: 597 mm (23.5 in) (Stock unfolded); 385 mm (15.2 in) (Stock folded)
- Barrel length: 175 mm (6.9 in); 110 mm (4.3 in) (APC9 K)
- Caliber: 9x19mm Parabellum.40 S&W; 10mm Auto.45 ACP; 357 SIG; 5.56×45mm NATO.300 AAC Blackout; 7.62×51mm NATO
- Action: Straight blowback, closed bolt Gas-operated, rotating bolt (APC556 and APC308)
- Rate of fire: 1,080 rounds/min (SMG variants only)
- Effective firing range: 100 m (110 yd)
- Feed system: 15-, 20-, 25-, and 30-round B&T MP9 detachable box magazine, 50-round drum magazine STANAG magazine (APC556); SR-25 pattern magazine (APC308)
- Sights: Iron sights and Picatinny rail for various optical sights

The B&T APC (Advanced Police Carbine) is a family of submachine guns, assault rifles and battle rifles produced and manufactured by B&T (formerly known as Brügger & Thomet) of Switzerland. Announced in 2011, the standard series uses standard 9×19mm (APC9), .40 S&W (APC40), 10mm Auto (APC10), and .45 ACP (APC45) ammunition.

== History ==
The APC series was designed in the 2000s as a modern submachine gun that would be cheaper to produce than the intermediate cartridge assault carbines, which saw an increase in military usage during this period. Before this point, B&T sold the MP9 and had experience in the manufacture of submachine guns, as well as years of feedback from customers on possible enhancements. The first B&T APCs were produced in 2011.

== Military adoption ==
On March 29, 2019, B&T was awarded a contract in the U.S. Army's Sub Compact Weapon Production-Other Transaction Agreement (P-OTA) competition for its APC9K submachine gun. The $2.6 million contract included an initial 350 subcompact weapons (SCW) with an option for additional quantities of up to 1,000 SCWs, with slings, manuals, accessories, and spare parts.

== Design details ==
The APC uses a straight blowback gas system. The addition of a proprietary hydraulic buffer system in the receiver back plate helps control recoil. More than 50% of the APC's parts are interchangeable between the different platforms.

The APC's upper receiver is made from aerospace-grade alloy, and the lower receiver, pistol grips, magazine, and butt stock are made from polymer. The APC uses the same magazines as the MP9.

The APC's mechanical sight is composed of an adjustable ghost ring type rear sight and a cylindrical sight. Sights can be folded in the base when not in use, and will pop out quickly when in use. The APC has an H&K MP5 style locked lugs-style barrel and can be equipped with a quick-release suppressor or flash hider. The APC45's barrel comes with a flash hider by default.

The APC shares a side-folding polymer stock with the B&T GL-06 grenade launcher. The trigger assembly is effectively the same as the AR-15/M16 rifle, and accepts many after-market replacement parts. The entire weapon, including the charging handle, are ambidextrous, and can be adjusted based on the operator's handedness.

In March 2019, B&T released its APC9 PRO series, an improvement with a non-reciprocating charging handle and a replaceable pistol grip, compatible with grips for the AR-15 style rifle family of firearms. The APC9 PRO features an optional lower receiver capable of using Glock magazines.

== Variants ==
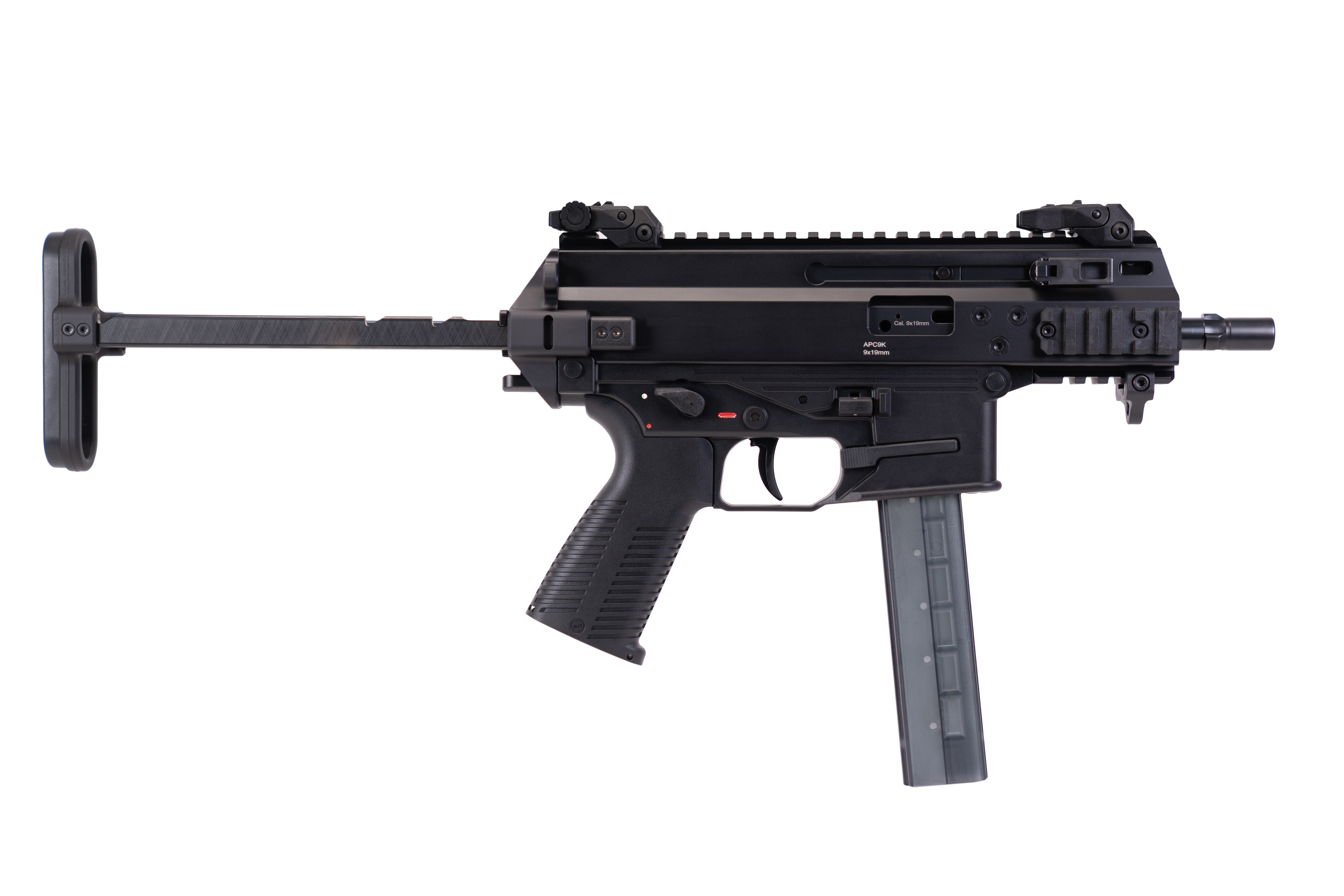
APC9 K

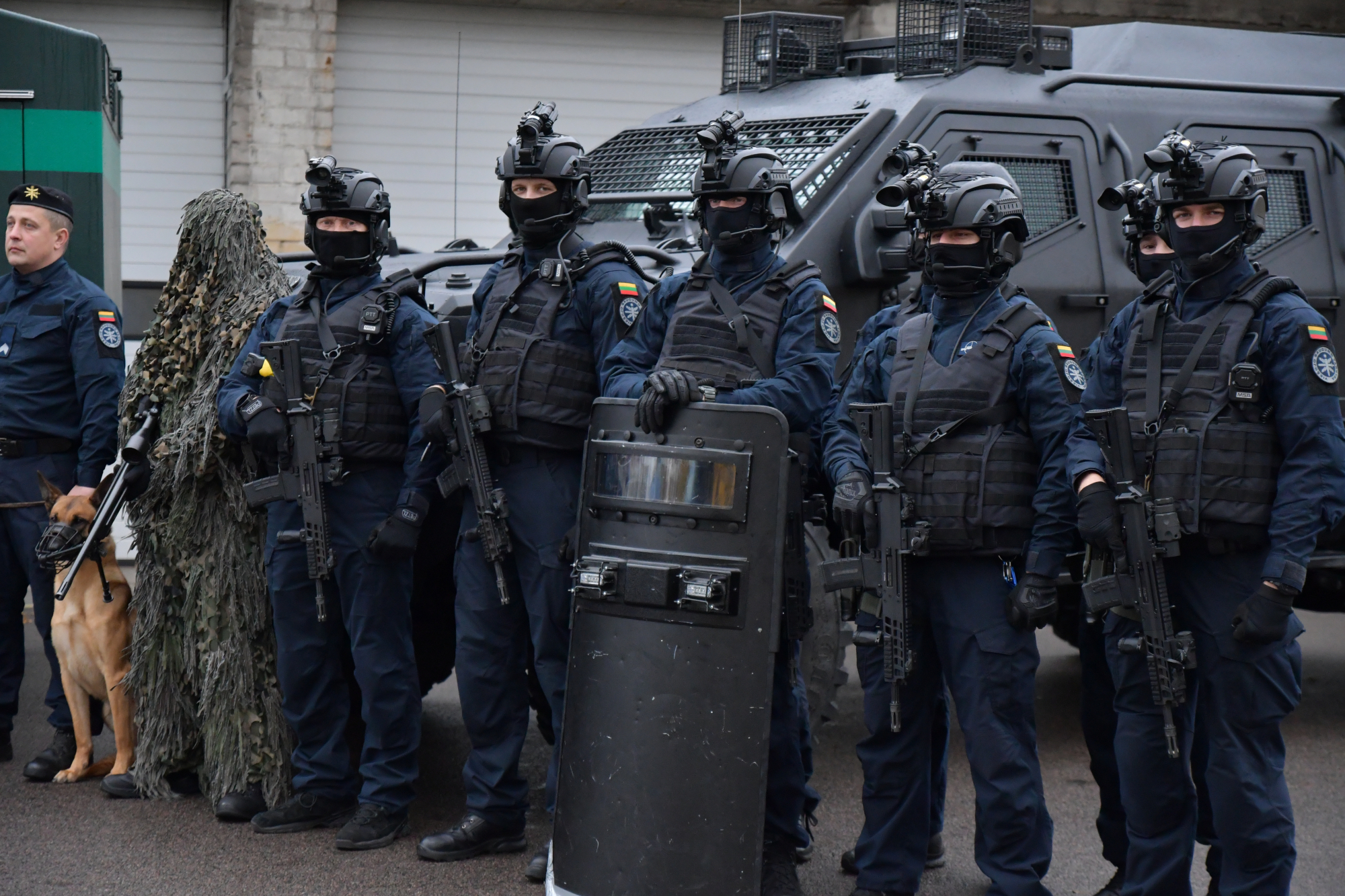
Lithuanian ORKA operators armed with intermediate-caliber APC556

The APC series is offered in several variants. The standard submachine gun has a barrel length of 175 mm (6.9 in) and the carbine variant has a 406-millimetre (16.0 in) barrel for the civilian market.

=== APC9 ===
The APC9 features a polymer receiver, magazine, and folding stock. It is select fire, and may be loaded either with 15-, 20-, 25-, or 30-round magazines.

- APC9 G – An APC9 with a lower receiver that is compatible with Glock pistol magazines.
- APC9 K – Shortened barrel variant of the APC9.
- APC9-SD – Variant of the APC9 with an integrated suppressor.
- APC9 K-SD2 – Variant of the APC9 K with an integrated suppressor.
- APC9 Carbine – Civilian variant of the APC9, can only be fired in semi-auto.
- APC9-P Carbine – Police variant of the APC9 carbine. Comes with longer handguards and longer barrel.
- APC9 Sports Carbine – Sporting variant of the APC9 carbine. Comes with longer handguards and longer barrel.
- APC9 for RWS ACTION SE Gen. II SXF – prototype with a heavier bolt to accommodate the RWS ACTION SE Gen. II SXF round with higher pressures meant to penetrate Level 3A Body armor. Presented at IWA 2025

=== APC40 ===
The APC40 is a .40 S&W variant of the APC9.

=== APC10 ===
The APC10 is a 10mm Auto variant of the APC9.

=== APC45 ===
The APC45 is a .45 ACP variant of the APC9.

The APC45-SD is an integrally suppressed variant of the APC45.

=== APC PRO series ===
The APC PRO series features the same pistol-calibre options from the original line. It can be configured with different stock options, suppressors, accessories, training variants and the ability to accept either Glock or SIG P320 magazines, giving the platform vast modularity for its operators.

=== APC556 ===
The APC556 is an assault rifle variant, chambered in 5.56×45mm NATO cartridge.

The APC556 PDW is a shortened barrel and shortened stock variant of the APC556.

=== APC300 ===
The APC300 is an assault rifle variant, chambered in .300 Blackout cartridge.

=== APC308 ===
The APC308 is a battle rifle variant, chambered in 7.62×51mm NATO cartridge.

== Users ==
Country	Organization name	Model	Quantity	Date	Reference
Argentina	Argentine Army Agrupacion de Fuerzas de Operaciones Especiales	APC9K, APC9SD, APC9 PRO G	263	2020-2021	
Belgium	Belgian Customs/Border patrol	APC9 PRO	-	?	
Brazil	Military Police of São Paulo State	APC40 PRO	1000	Dec 2020	
Brazil	Civil Police (Brazil)	APC9	700	2023	
Slovakia	Slovak Police Force Prison and Court Guard Service	APC9	26+	2019	
Ukraine	Kraken Regiment	APC45	-	2023	
Ukraine	State Bureau of Investigation (Ukraine)	APC9	700	2023	
United States	United States Army Personal Security Detachments	APC9K	350	2019	
United States	United States Air Force Personal Security Detachments	APC9K	65	2020	
United States	Westchester County Police	APC9SD	-	2019	
United States	Miami Beach Police Department	APC9K Pro	-	2020	
United States	Hillsborough County Sheriff's Office Issued to School resource officer's	APC9K Pro	-	2022	

== See also ==
- CZ Scorpion EVO 3
- FAMAE SAF
- SIG MPX
