= VP9 (disambiguation) =

VP9 is a video compression standard being developed by Google.

VP9 or VP-9 may also refer to:

- VP-9, Patrol Squadron 9, a U.S. Navy patrol squadron
- Heckler & Koch VP9, a German polymer-framed striker-fired pistol
- Brügger & Thomet VP9, a Swiss integrally-suppressed bolt-action pistol with the design based on the Welrod
- VP9, a viral protein; for example in Banna virus
