= Brügger & Thomet TP380 =

TP380
- Type: Semi-automatic pistol
- Place of origin: Switzerland

Production history
- Designer: Brügger & Thomet
- Designed: 2015
- Manufacturer: Brügger & Thomet

Specifications
- Length: 251mm (stock retracted); 451mm (stock extended)
- Barrel length: 128mm
- Cartridge: 9×17mm Browning / .380ACP
- Action: Blowback operated
- Feed system: 15 or 30 round transparent box magazine

The Brügger & Thomet TP380 is a semi automatic pistol manufactured by B&T. The weapon is a scaled down variant of the MP9.

== Overview ==
The Brügger & Thomet TP380 is a semi automatic .380 ACP calibre semi-automatic pistol using a simple blowback operation. The weapon uses high impact polymer and transparent polymer double column/double stack magazines. Barrel is also threaded for suppressors.

== See also ==
- List of pistols
