= 2021 Miami Beach police attack =

- Date: July 26, 2021
- Time: ~ 1:00 a.m. EST
- Location: Royal Palm Hotel Miami Beach, Miami, Florida
- Type: Police brutality
- Injuries: 2
- Charges: Sgt. Jose Perez, Officer Kevin Perez, Officer Robert Sabater, Officer David Rivas, Officer Steven Serrano

On July 26, 2021, five Miami Beach Police officers assaulted nonresistant Dalonta Crudup in handcuffs at the Royal Palm Hotel; officers also assaulted and later arrested a bystander, 28-year-old Khalid Vaughn, who was recording the incident on his smartphone. Police arrested 24-year-old Crudup for illegally parking a scooter and allegedly severely attacking an officer with it. Both men were African-American.

== Event ==
After running from police, Crudup was captured and handcuffed on the floor of the lobby of the hotel, where he was repeatedly kicked by officers, had his head slammed into the ground, while not resisting, and was punched. An officer then tackled recording bystander Vaughn, and another then repeatedly kicked and elbowed him in the face and punched him in the ribcage.

== Aftermath ==
=== Civilians ===
Vaughn was arrested on charges of resisting an officer and interfering with a police officer, while 27-year-old Sharif Cobb, also recording, was also arrested and charged with battery and aggravated assault against a police officer; the charges against Vaughn were dropped, while Crudup's were reduced to fleeing and eluding police. Crudup commented on the attack, saying "I got beat up, got stitches, went to the hospital. ... They beat up two dudes that was recording me that was inside the hotel, and they ain’t even do nothing wrong".

=== Officers ===
The officers were suspended, surrendered to face charges, and all five were subsequently criminally charged with first-degree misdemeanor battery. Miami Beach Police Chief Richard Clements called the officers' response "disheartening", and investigation is still ongoing. Three officers had their charges upgraded to third-degree felonies, with Kevin Perez and Jose Perez being charged with felony battery, and Javier Serrano charged with official misconduct.

== See also ==
- Police brutality in the United States
