= Vertical forward grip =

Type of pistol grip

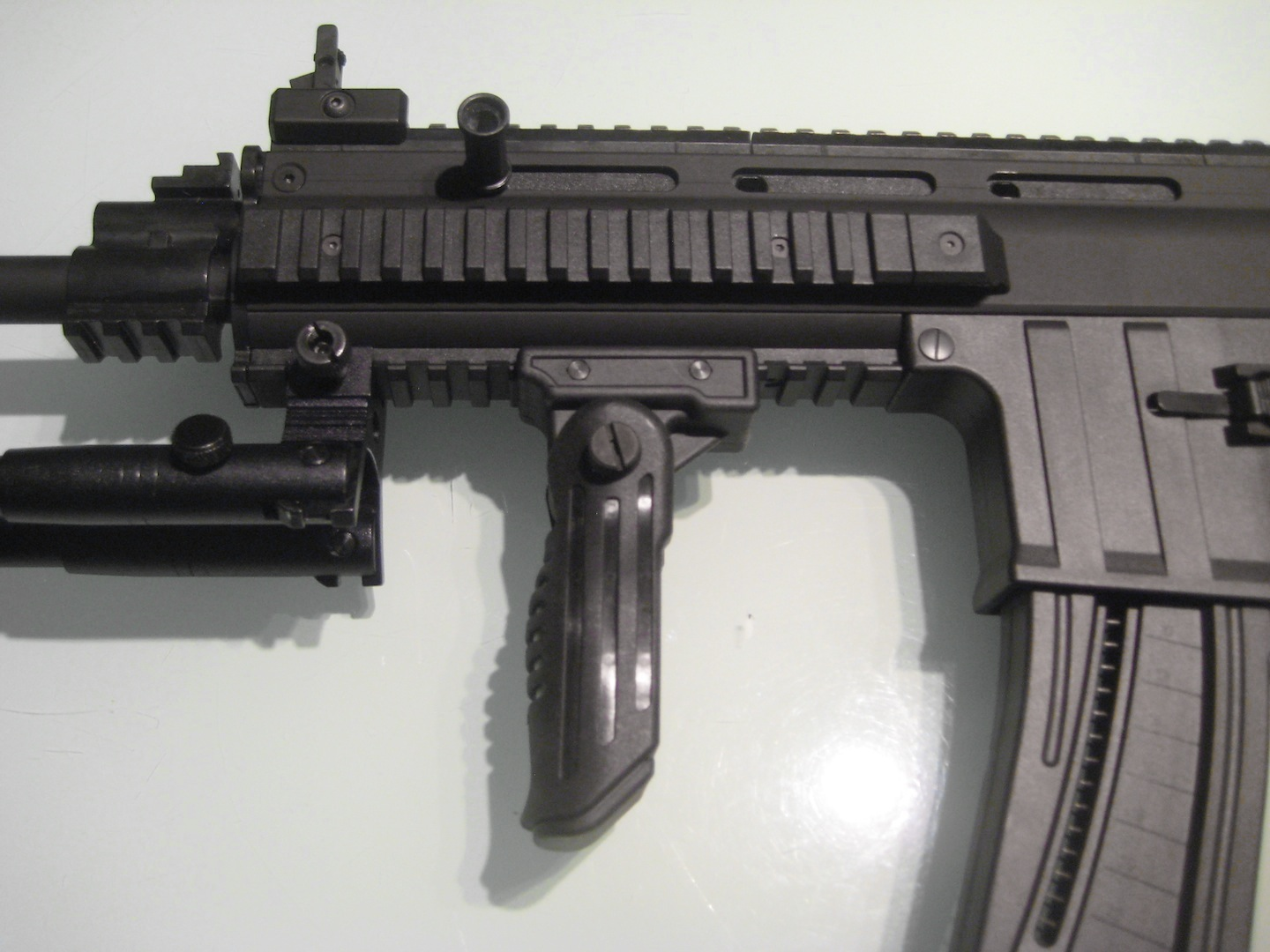
ISSC MK22 rifle with a vertical forward grip.

A vertical forward grip or foregrip is a vertical pistol grip mounted on the fore-end of a long-barrel firearm, designed for grasping by the frontal support hand (or "off hand").

== Use ==
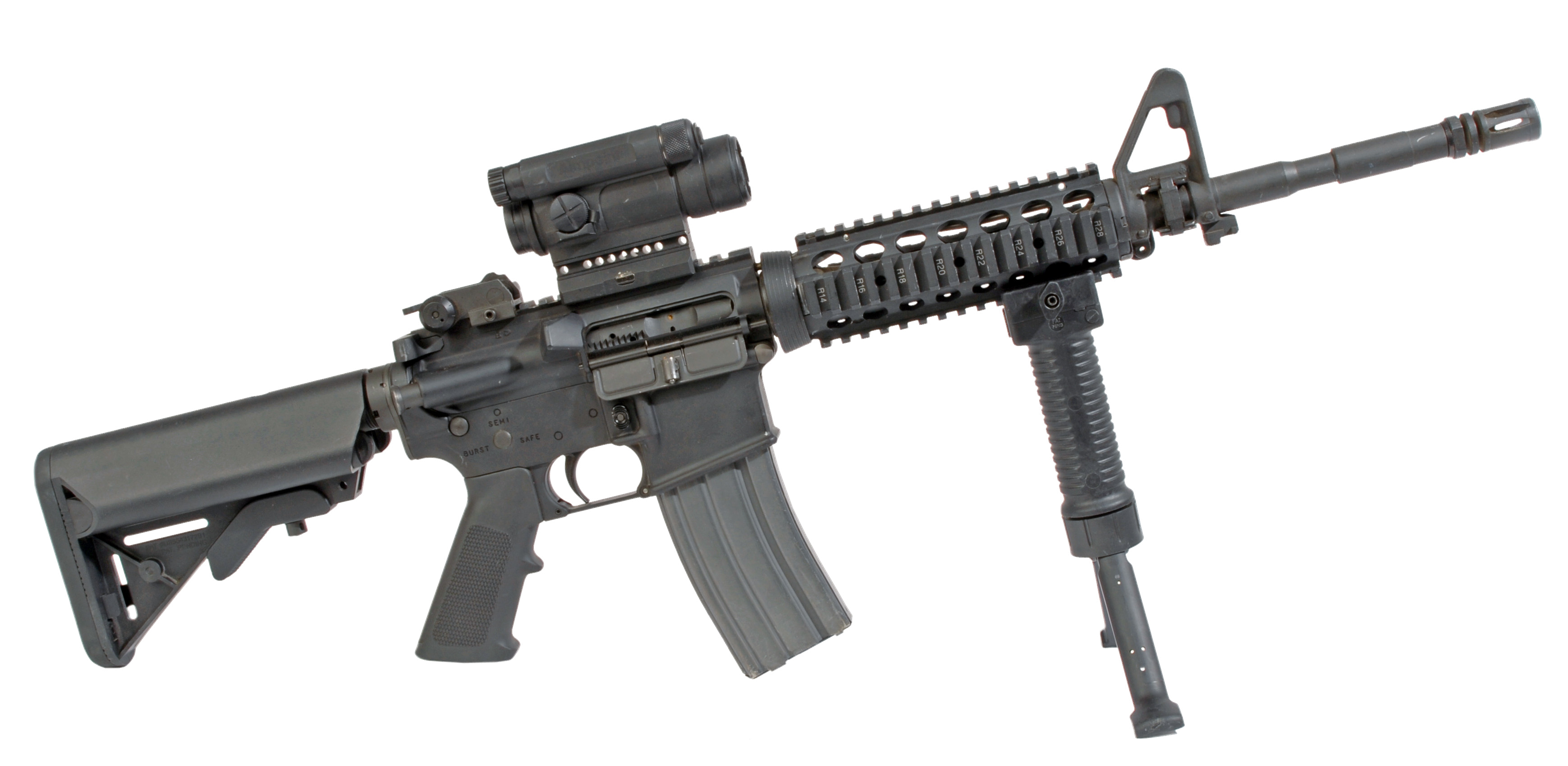
An M4 carbine showing a GPS-02 "Grip Pod", a type of vertical grip that has a deployable bipod inside the handle

Forward grips aid in the maneuverability of the firearm, since the natural angle of a person's outstretched hand is more oriented to grasping objects at a vertical angle, rather than a horizontal one perpendicular to the body. Foregrips can decrease accuracy in precision rifle shooting if the shooter tends to "muscle the weapon".

Vertical foregrips can have features located inside the inner diameter, such as a deployable bipod inside the grip's housing. The grip may also have a tactical light and the control switches molded into the grip's assembly. Other designs may contain storage space for spare parts, spare batteries for optics, weapon lights, or small first aid gear.

== Stubby grip ==
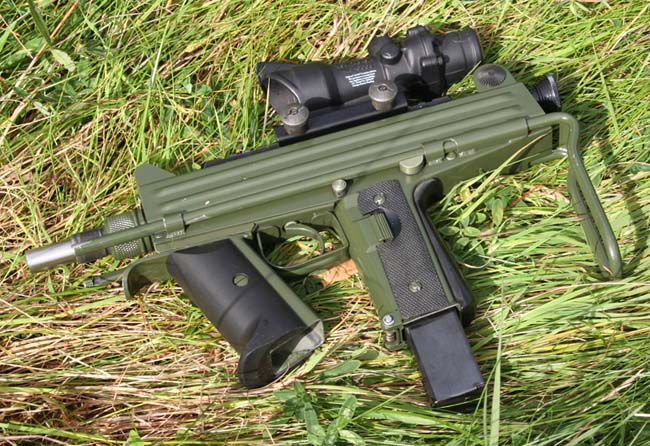
CBJ-MS with stubby grip

A shorter version is referred to as a "stubby grip" and is primarily intended to keep the shooter's hand from moving forward of the muzzle.

== Angled forward grip ==
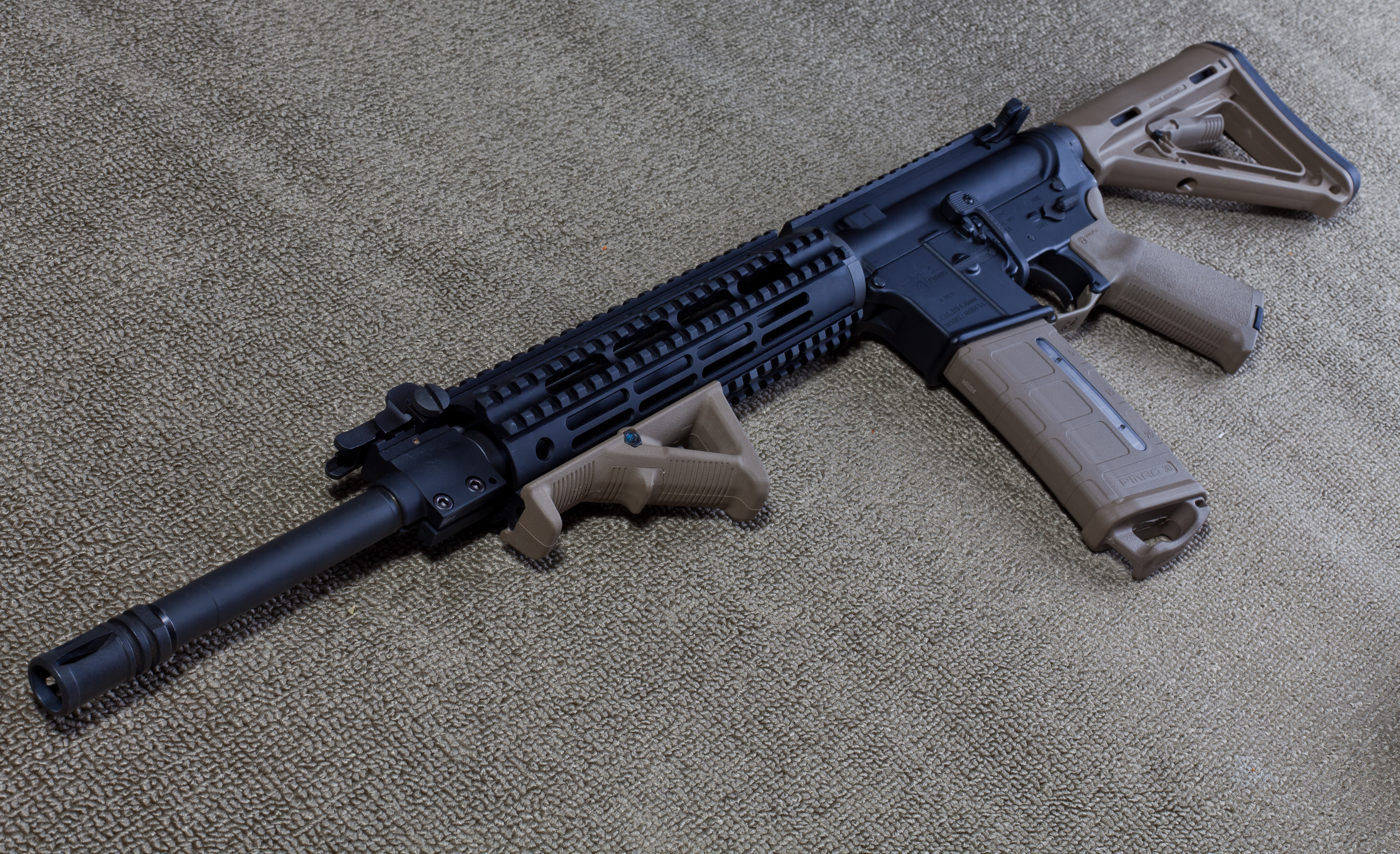
AR-15 with a Magpul Industries Angled Fore Grip (AFG®)

Angled forward grips can provide similar functionality to vertical forward grips. They differ in that a vertical foregrip is more useful for "driving" the weapon, while an angled foregrip is more effective at pulling the weapon into the shooter's shoulder while keeping the offhand wrist in a comfortable and manageable position, which helps with accuracy. Some angled foregrips are designed to be used with the C Clamp grip which allows good pointability (as vertical foregrips allow) as well as better accuracy because of the shooter's more firm purchase on the weapon.

== Legality on pistols in the U.S. ==
The legality of vertical foregrips on pistols in the United States is unclear. In the United States, firearms are categorized by the National Firearms Act and firearms manufactured with specific features are subject to restrictions and controls.

In May 1993, in response to legal action brought by the Bureau of Alcohol, Tobacco, and Firearms (ATF), the South Carolina District Court's finding of fact concluded that a pistol modified with the addition of vertical fore grips was still a pistol and not any other weapon device.

In an open letter sent to Federal Firearms Licensees in April 2006, the ATF stated their interpretation of the law: that installing a vertical forward grip on a handgun is the same as manufacturing an Any Other Weapon (AOW) category firearm and subject to registration and taxation, with significant penalties for manufacturing or possessing such an unregistered weapon.

The ATF has stated that angled grips do not make an AOW from a handgun.

== See also ==
- Glossary of firearms terms
