= SIG Pro =

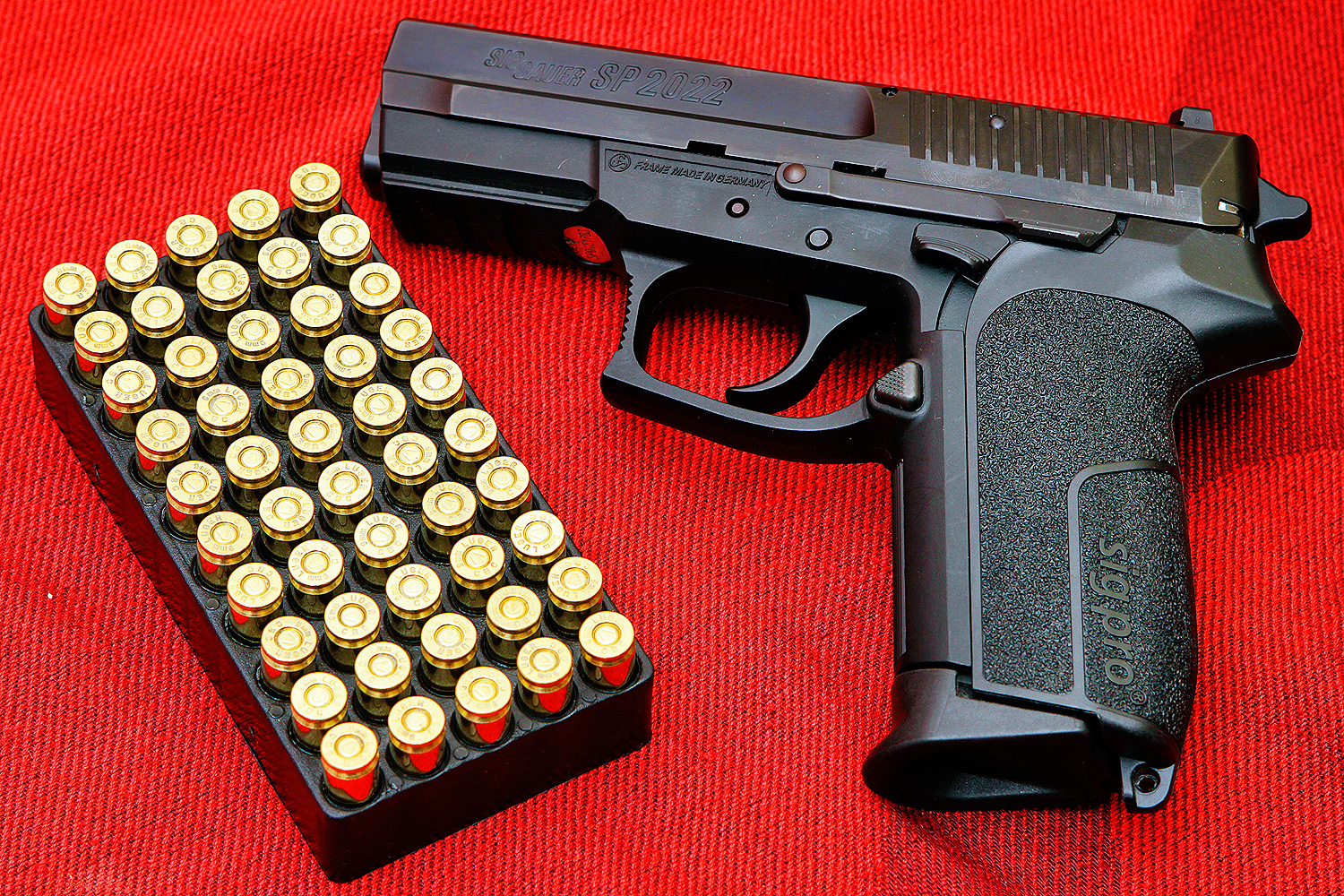
- SIG Pro (SP 2022 variant)
- Type: Semi-automatic pistol
- Place of origin: United States

Service history
- In service: 2000–present
- Used by: See Users

Production history
- Designer: SIG Sauer
- Designed: 1998
- Manufacturer: SIG Sauer, Inc.
- Produced: 1999–present
- Variants: See Variants

Specifications
- Mass: 765 g (27.0 oz) (SP 2340 .40 S&W); 775 g (27.3 oz) (SP 2340 .357 SIG, SP 2022 .40 S&W, SP 2022 .357 SIG); 715 g (25.2 oz) (SP 2009, SP 2022 9×19mm Parabellum); 700 g (25 oz) (SPC 2009)
- Length: 187 mm (7.4 in) (SP 2340, SP 2009, SP 2022)
- Barrel length: 99 mm (3.9 in) (SP 2022)
- Width: 36 mm (1.4 in) (SP 2022)
- Height: 145 mm (5.7 in) (SP 2022)
- Cartridge: .40 S&W.357 SIG; 9×19mm Parabellum; With aftermarket conversion: 6.5×25mm CBJ
- Action: Short recoil operated, locked breech
- Effective firing range: 50 m
- Feed system: Detachable box magazine; capacities: 10 rounds (all restricted models); 12 rounds (standard) (.40 S&W and .357 SIG); 15 rounds (extended) (.40 S&W and .357 SIG); 15 rounds (standard) (9×19mm Parabellum); 17 rounds (extended) (9×19mm Parabellum); 18 rounds (extended) (9×19mm Parabellum)
- Sights: Fixed iron sights, front – blade, rear – notch

The SIG Pro is a series of semi-automatic pistols manufactured by SIG Sauer in Exeter, New Hampshire. It became the first polymer-frame handgun from SIG Sauer and one of the first pistols to feature a built-in universal accessory rail and interchangeable grips. Offerings in the series are chambered in .40 S&W, .357 SIG, or 9×19mm Parabellum. As of March 2020, only the SP 2022 variant was still listed on the SIG Sauer website. The SIG Pro was marketed as a lightweight and compact alternative to the "legacy" SIG Sauer handguns in an increasingly competitive and budget-oriented law enforcement market.

== Variants ==
There have been two generations of SIG Pro offerings, with five total variants. The below are each hammer-fired semi-automatic pistols operating in double action / single action (DA/SA), with a decocker and without a manual safety, unless noted otherwise.

=== First generation ===
These offerings feature a proprietary SIG accessory rail. It was originally developed as a .40 S&W caliber service pistol and introduced in June 1998, followed shortly by a version in .357 SIG. About a year later, a 9×19mm Parabellum variant was introduced and entered production in response to demand for the type.

- SP 2340 – chambered in .357 SIG or .40 S&W.
- SP 2009 – chambered in 9×19mm.
  - One model (P2009-9-BMS) features a manual safety and shortened trigger.
- SPC 2009 – compact version of the SP 2009, chambered in 9×19mm.

=== Second generation ===
These offerings feature a Picatinny rail, and a trigger guard that is visibly different than the first-generation variants. The design was selected in 2002 as a new service pistol for French police, intended to have a 20-year service life (until 2022), hence the model number.

- SP 2022 – chambered in 9×19mm, .357 SIG or .40 S&W.
  - Some models (such as E2022-9-BSS-MS) are available with a manual safety.
- SPC 2022 – compact version of the SP 2009, chambered in 9×19mm.

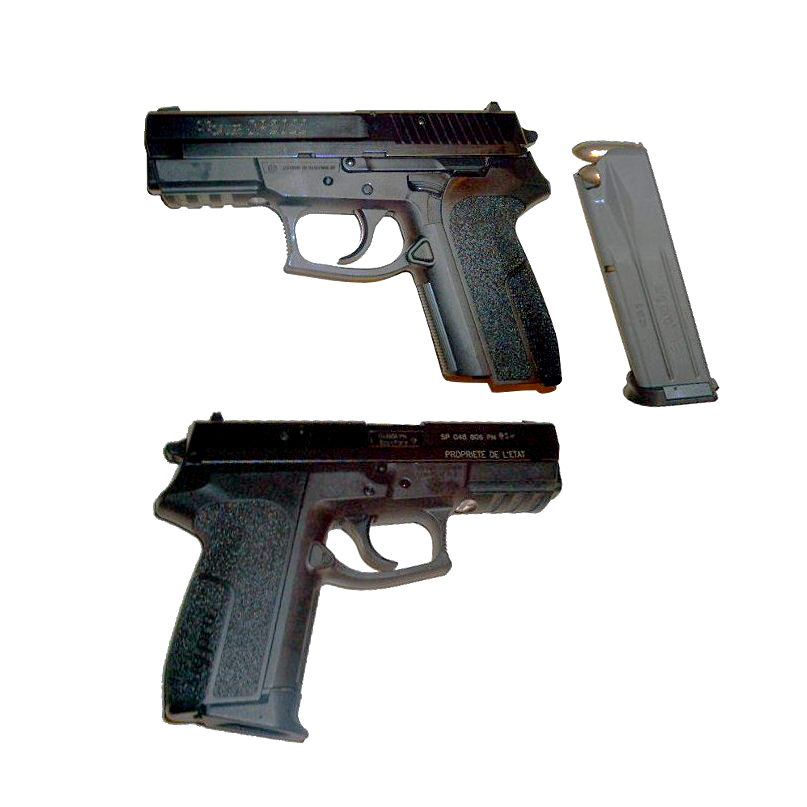
An SP 2022 of the French National Police

== Users ==
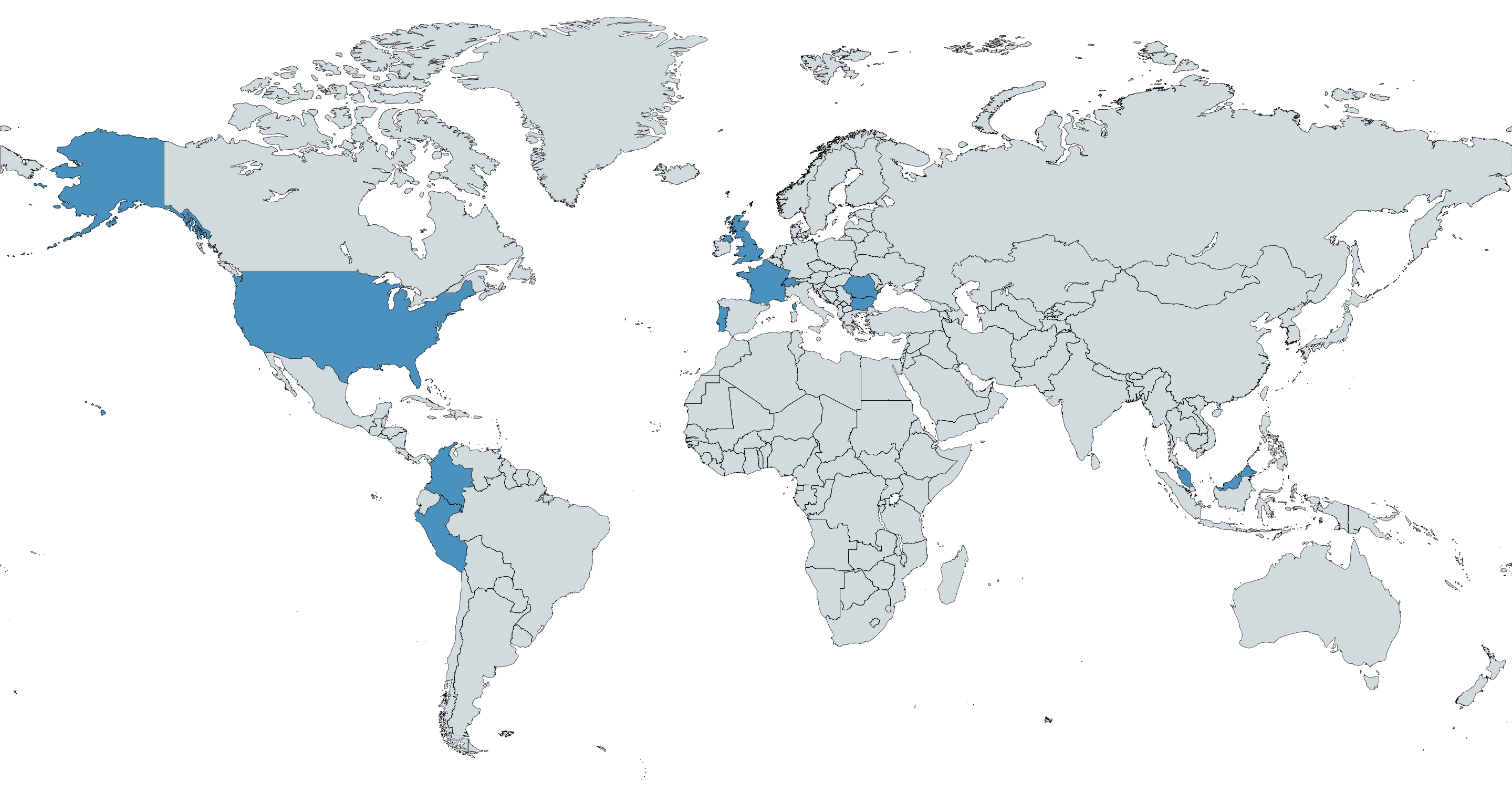
Map with SIG Pro users in blue

- Colombia: Colombian National Police, several thousand SP 2009 and 120,890 SP 2022
- France: French law enforcement and internal security agencies (including the National Gendarmerie, National Police and French Customs), over 250,000 of SP 2022 (the largest single order for service handguns since World War II)
- Malaysia: Royal Malaysia Police (some 2,000 batches of SP 2022 and SPC 2022 pistols chambered in 9mm purchased in year 2007)
- Peru: SP 2022, National Police of Peru
- Portugal: SP 2022, Republican National Guard and Public Security Police
- Romania: Brigada Specială de Intervenție a Jandarmeriei
- Switzerland: SPC 2009, Swiss Military Police (as the Pistole 03).
- Trinidad and Tobago: Trinidad and Tobago Police Service
- United Kingdom: Essex Police
- United States: Richmond Police in .357 SIG. Up to 5,000 SP 2022s ordered by U.S. Army through a commercial off-the-shelf contract in December 2018.
