= Steyr TMP =

Austrian submachine gun/machine pistol

TMP
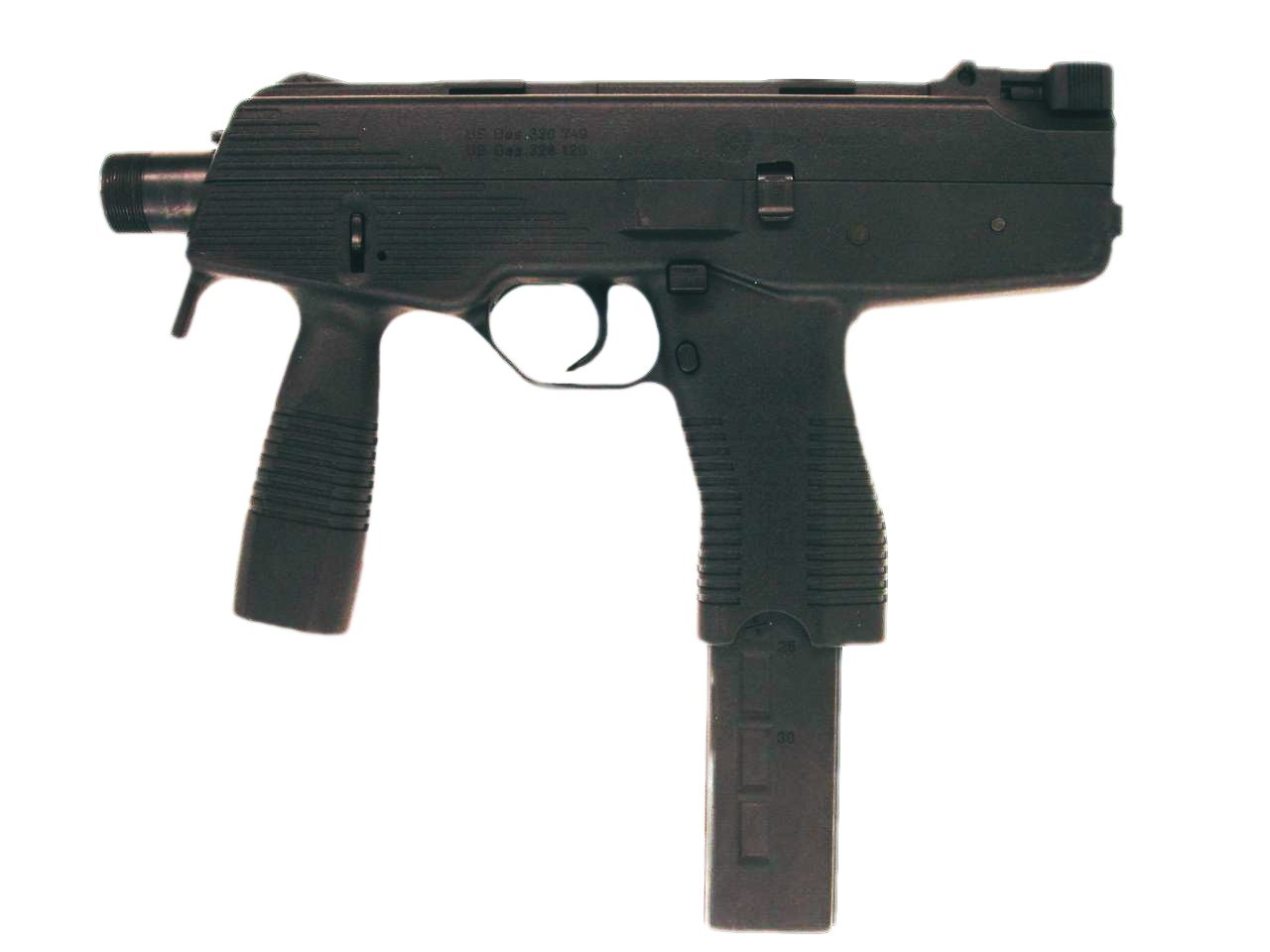
- The Steyr TMP
- Type: Machine pistol
- Place of origin: Austria

Service history
- Used by: See Users

Production history
- Designer: Friedrich Aigner
- Designed: 1989
- Manufacturer: Steyr Mannlicher
- Produced: 1992–2001
- Variants: SPP

Specifications
- Mass: 1.3 kg (2.9 lb) empty
- Length: 282 mm (11.10 in.)
- Barrel length: 130 mm (5.12 in.)
- Cartridge: 9×19mm Parabellum
- Action: Short recoil, locking rotating barrel, delayed blowback
- Rate of fire: 850–900 rounds/min
- Muzzle velocity: 400 m/s (1,312 ft/s)
- Effective firing range: 100 m
- Feed system: 15 or 30 round detachable box magazine

The Steyr TMP (Taktische Maschinenpistole/Tactical Machine Pistol) is a 9×19mm Parabellum caliber machine pistol manufactured by Steyr Mannlicher of Austria. The magazines come in 15 or 30 round detachable box types. A suppressor can also be fitted. Though originally intended to be used without a shoulder stock, an optional fixed stock was made available later.

In 2001, Steyr sold the design to Brügger & Thomet, which developed it into the Brügger & Thomet MP9.

== SPP ==
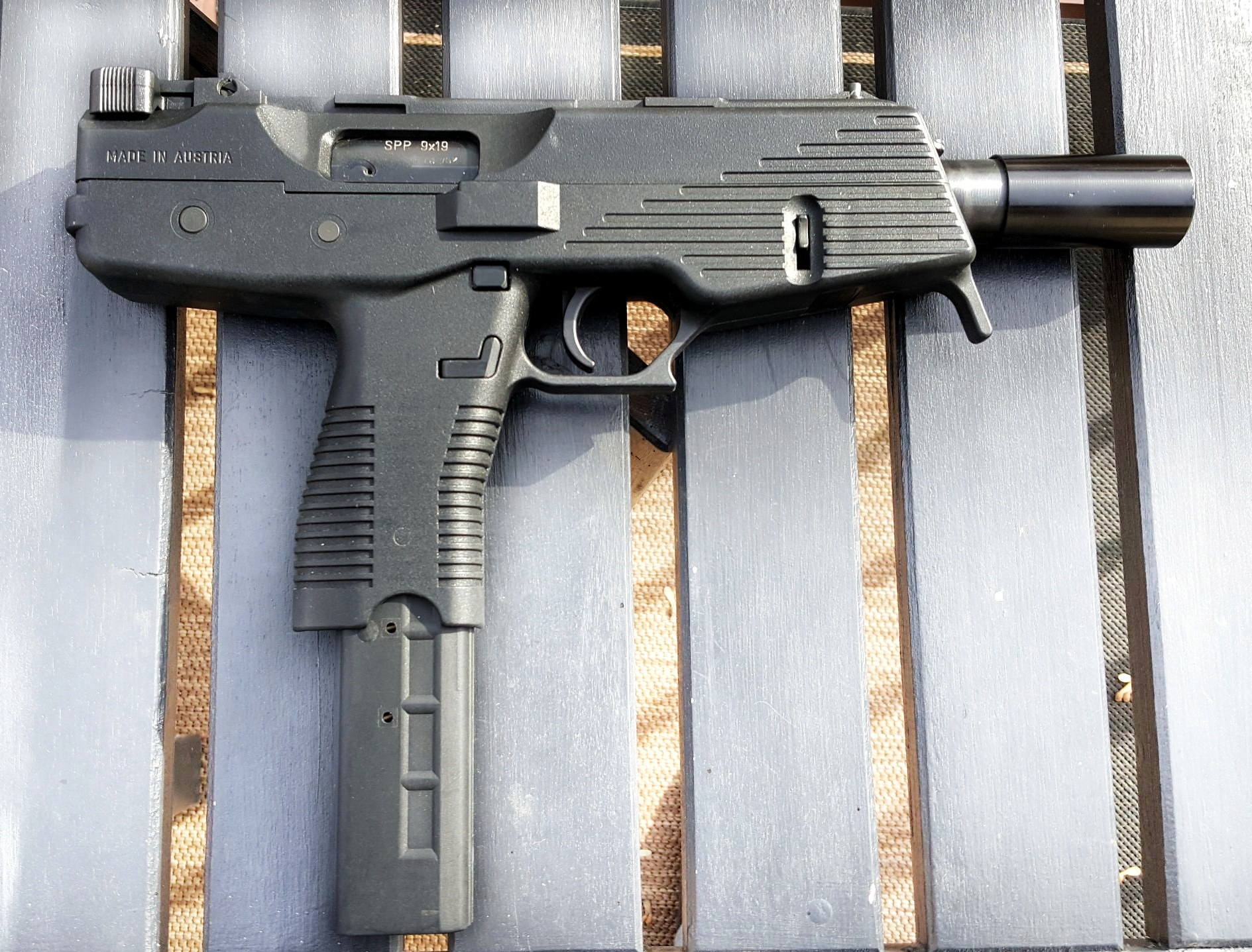
An American imported Steyr Mannlicher SPP with 30 round magazine

The Steyr SPP (Special Purpose Pistol) is a semi-automatic variant of the TMP. The TMP's barrel and barrel jacket lengths were increased slightly so there is a greater length of protruding jacket and barrel. The forward tactical pistol grip was also removed. It is large for a pistol and is constructed mainly from Nylon 66.

== Users ==
- Austria: Used by EKO Cobra.
- Saudi Arabia
- Italy: Used by the Gruppo di Intervento Speciale.
- Myanmar: Manufactured locally as MA-13 MK-II.

== See also ==
- Beretta 93R
- Brügger & Thomet MP9
- Heckler & Koch VP70
- KGP-9
- Milkor BXP
- Patria
- PP-2000
