= Miami Beach Police Department =

Police department serving Miami Beach, Florida

Coordinates: 25.782437°N 80.133229°W

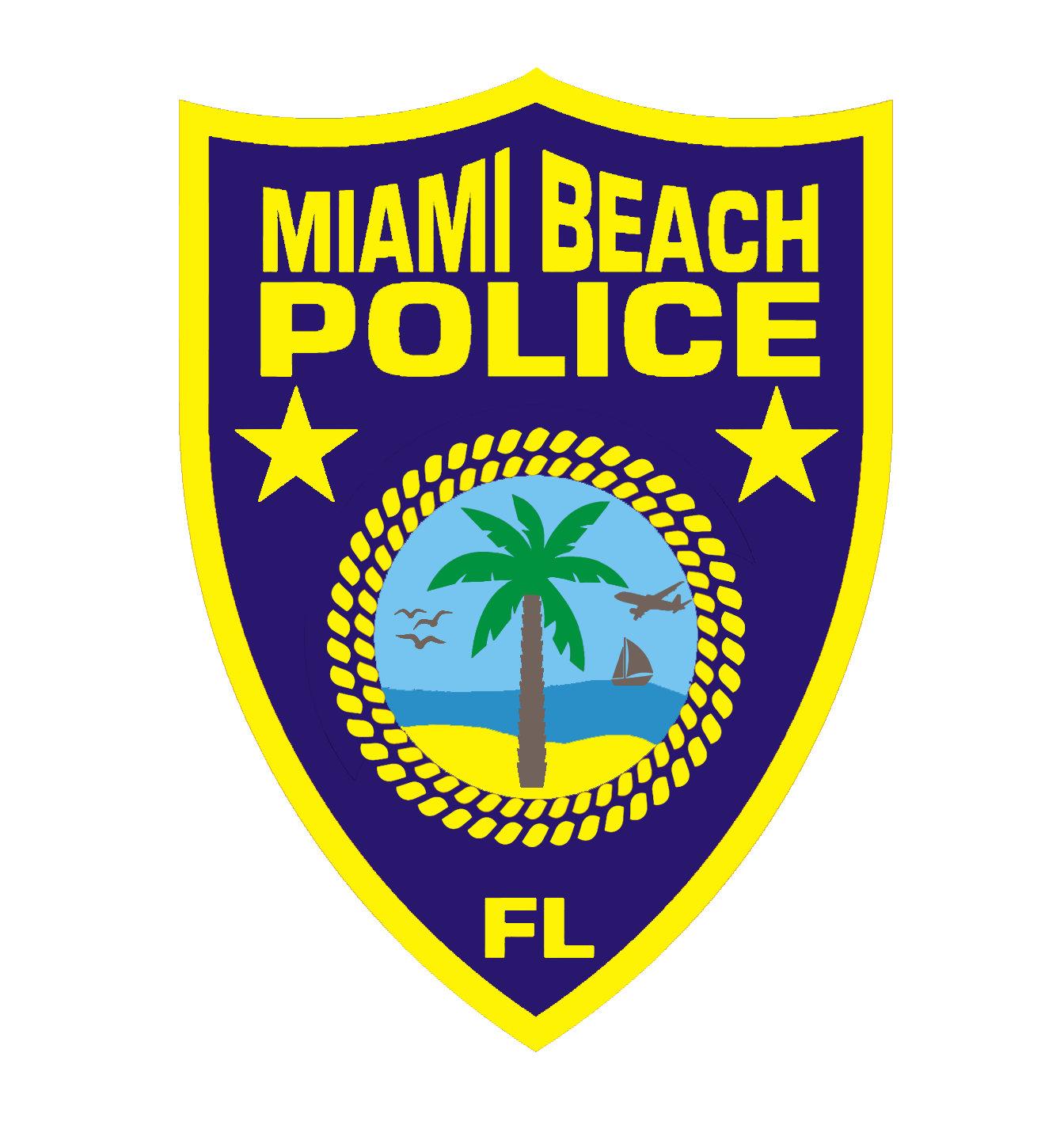

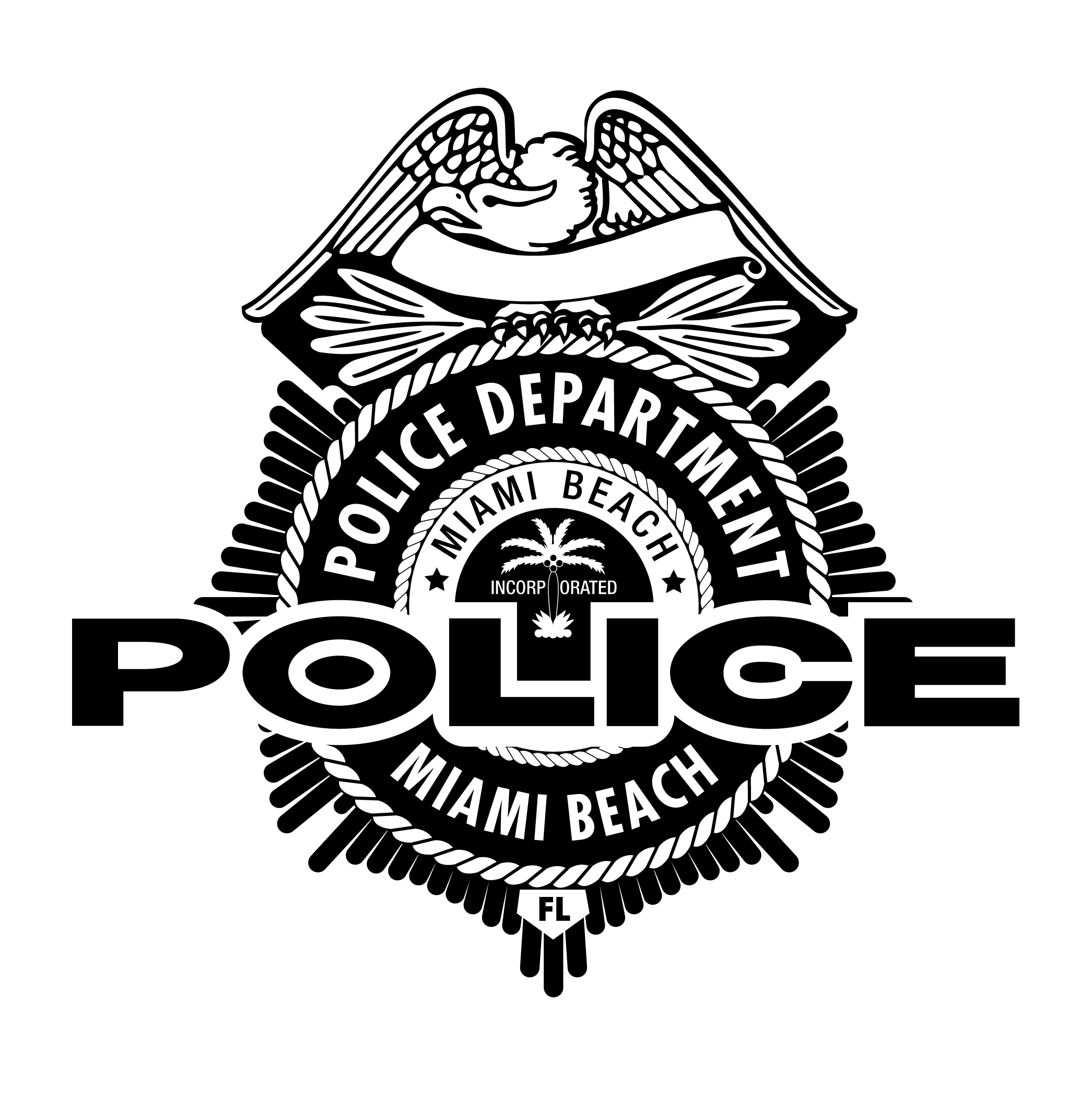

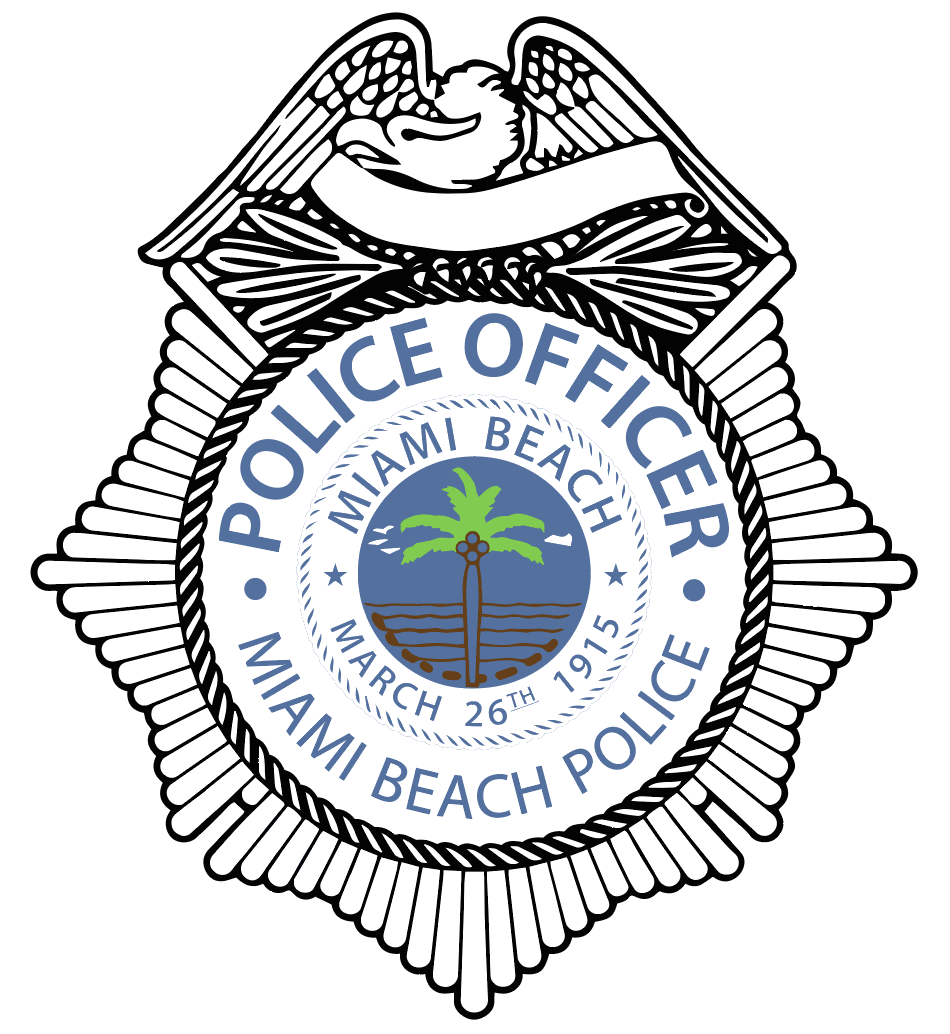
- Abbreviation: MBPD

Agency overview
- Formed: March 26, 1915

Jurisdictional structure
- Operations jurisdiction: Miami Beach, Florida, USA
- Map of Miami Beach Police Department's jurisdiction
- Area: 18.7 square miles (48 km^{2})
- Population: 87,779 (2010)
- General nature: Local civilian police

Operational structure
- Headquarters: 1100 Washington Avenue, Miami Beach, Florida 33139
- Police Officers: 400
- Agency executive: Wayne Jones, Chief of Police
- Districts: 3

Website
- Miami Beach Police Department

The Miami Beach Police Department is the police department of the U.S. city of Miami Beach, Florida, patrolling the entire Miami Beach area, although they sometimes cooperate with the county-wide Miami-Dade Sheriff's Office.

== Uniforms ==
When on bicycle patrols, officers wear dark blue shorts and white short-sleeve uniform tops. The bicycle patrols were created due to the frequent traffic congestion of the Miami Beach isles, particularly in the Ocean Drive area of South Beach. Bicycle patrols also perform traffic duties.

As of 2008, Miami Beach Police wore dark blue trousers with dark blue shirts, and had red, white, and blue patrol vehicles.

== Firearms ==
In 2020, the Miami Beach Police adopted the Brügger & Thomet APC variant, APC9K PRO, which includes the lower receiver to accept SIG Sauer P320 9mm magazines. Beginning in the 1980s, MBPD transitioned to the SIG Sauer P226. In 2012, the department adopted the Smith & Wesson M&P .40S&W, which is currently being replaced by the SIG Sauer P320 X-CARRY PRO in 9mm as of 2021. The P320 X-CARRY was chosen as the department's new duty sidearm after competing with the Beretta APX, Glock 19, SIG Sauer P226, and Smith & Wesson M&P9 M2.0. The department also evaluated and is adopting the SIG Sauer P365 for concealed carry and/or off-duty sidearm roles.

== Incidents ==
In July 2021, five officers assaulted Dalonta Crudup and two bystanders filming the incident. The officers were charged with first-degree misdemeanor battery.

== Demographics ==
Year	Percentage of full-time sworn personnel							
Year	Female	Male	African American or Black	American Indian	Asian/Pacific Islander	Hispanic, any race	White, non-Hispanic	Other race
1993	28.1	71.9	8.4	0	0	23.7	68	—N/a
1997	10	90	9	1	0	31	58	—N/a
2000	10	90	9	0	1	34	56	0

== Gallery ==
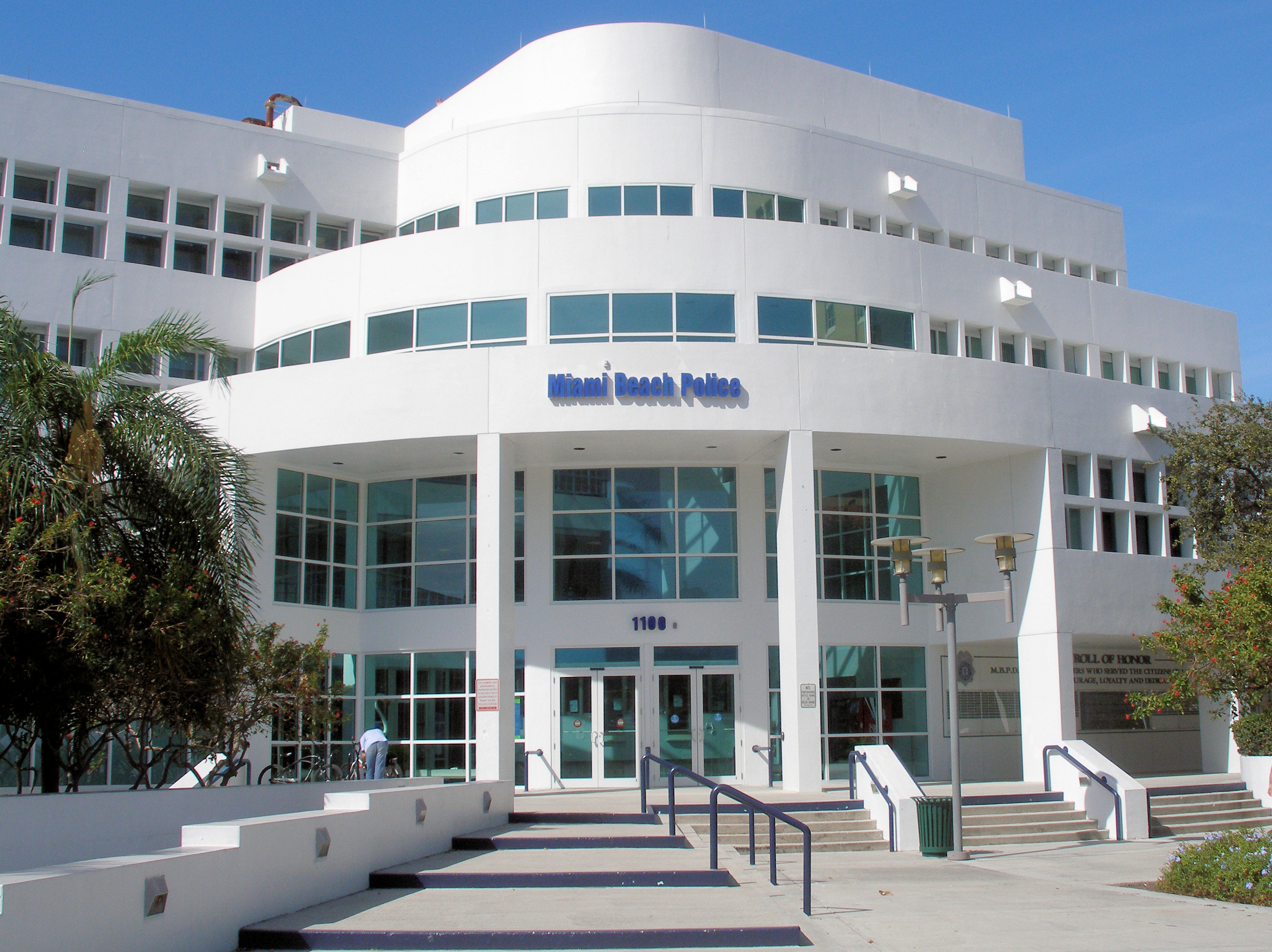
Headquarters in Miami Beach

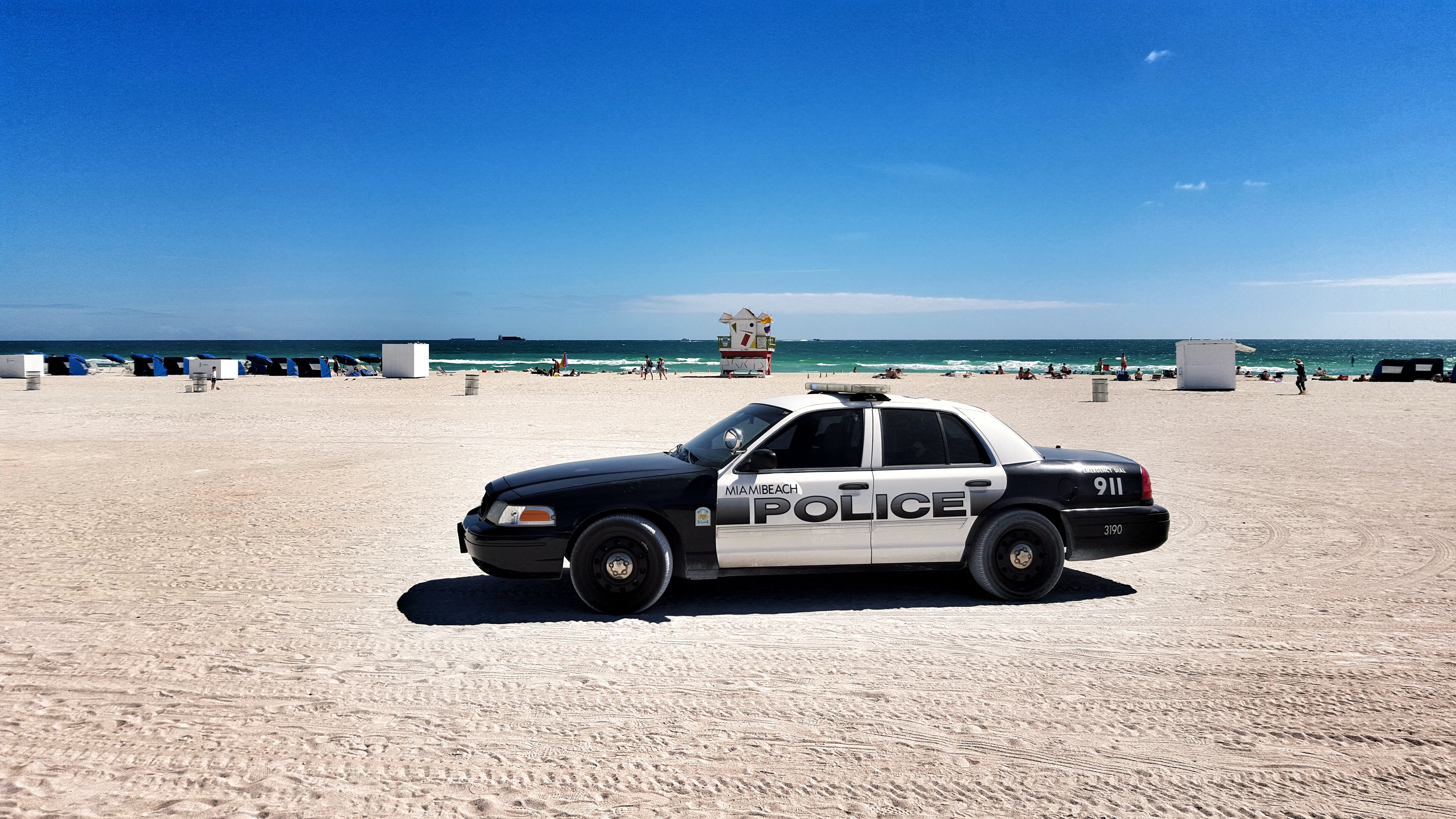
A Beach Patrol

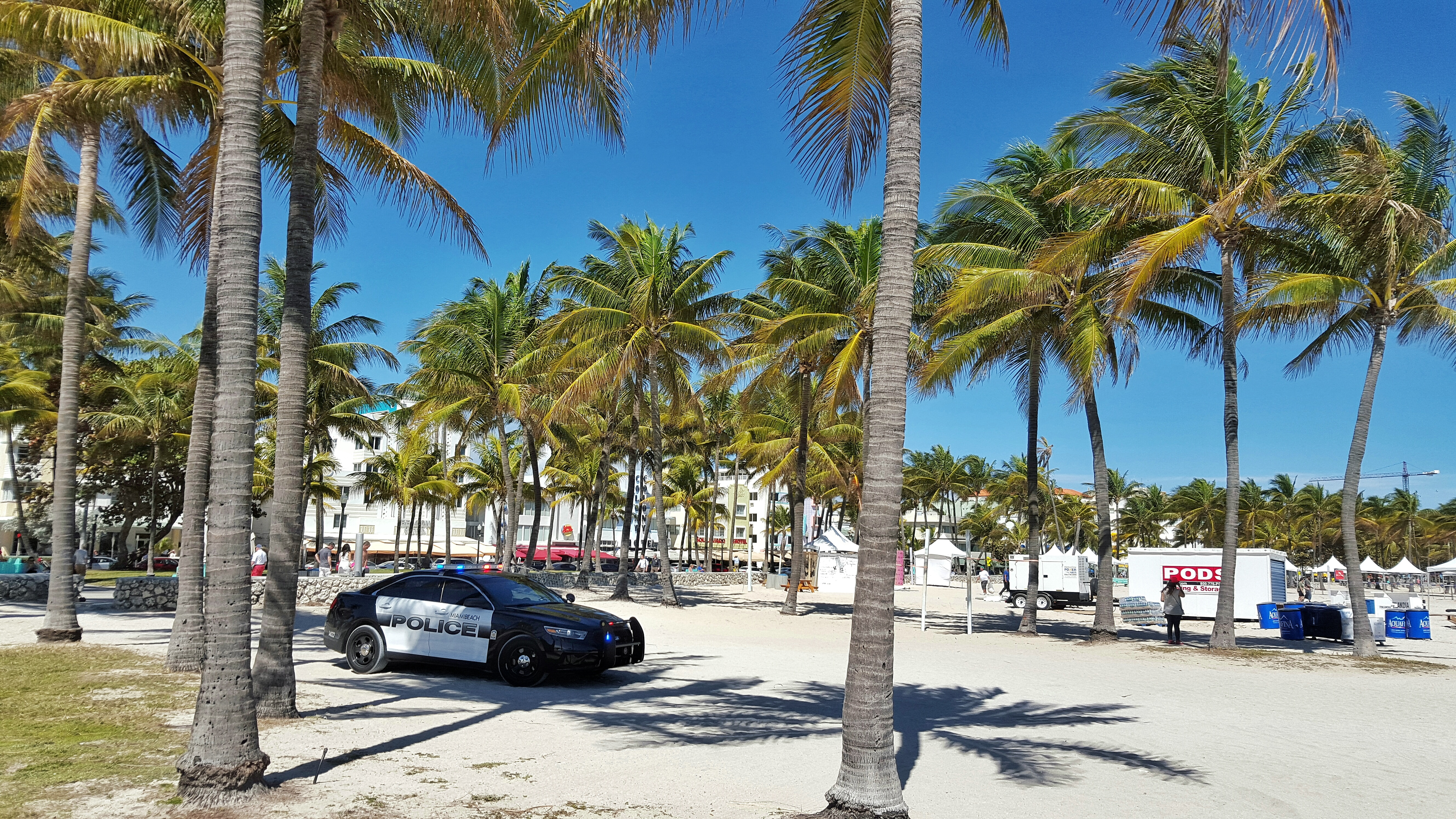
Police car in Lummus Park

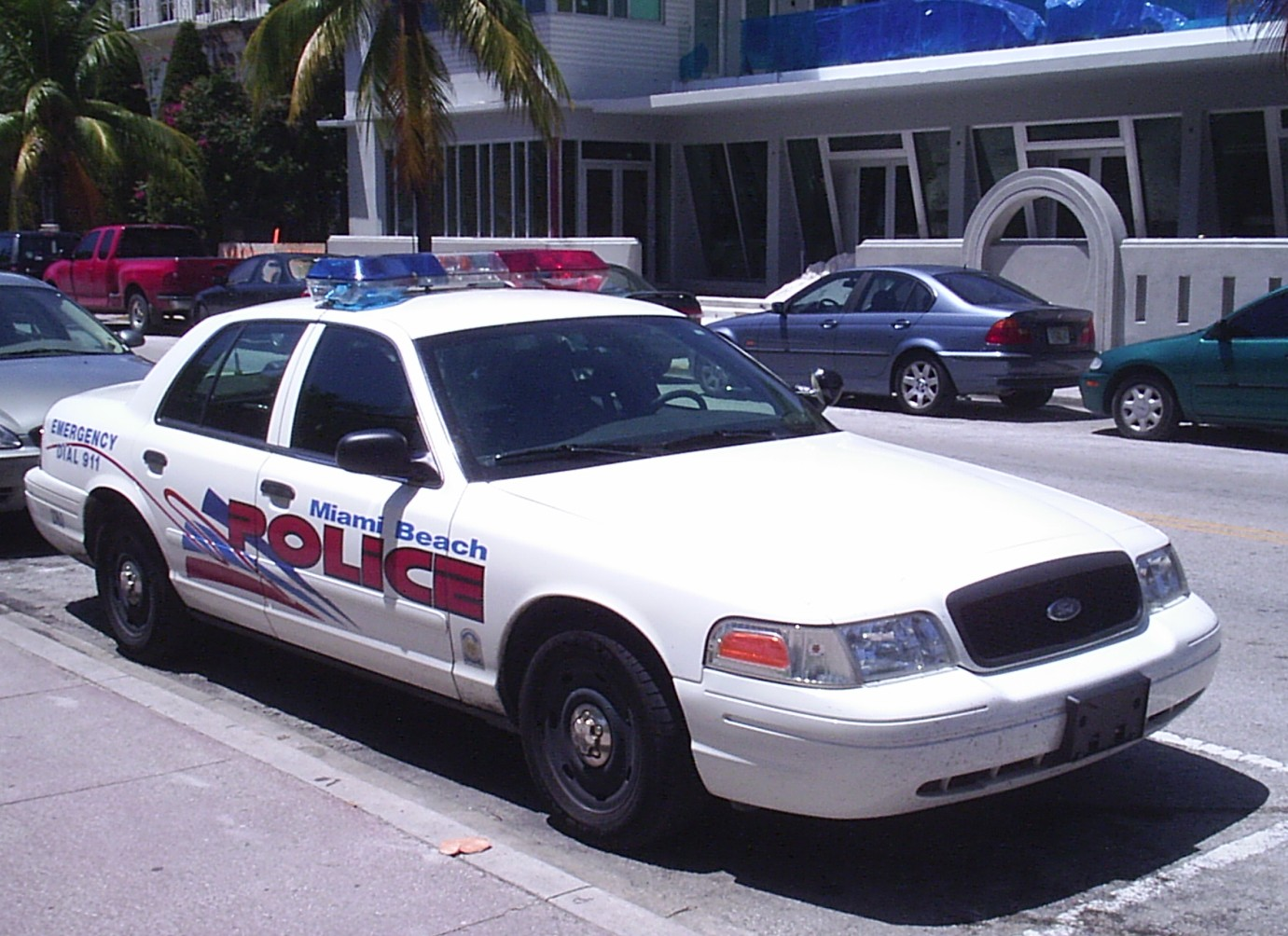
A Ford Crown Victoria Police Interceptor on Ocean Drive

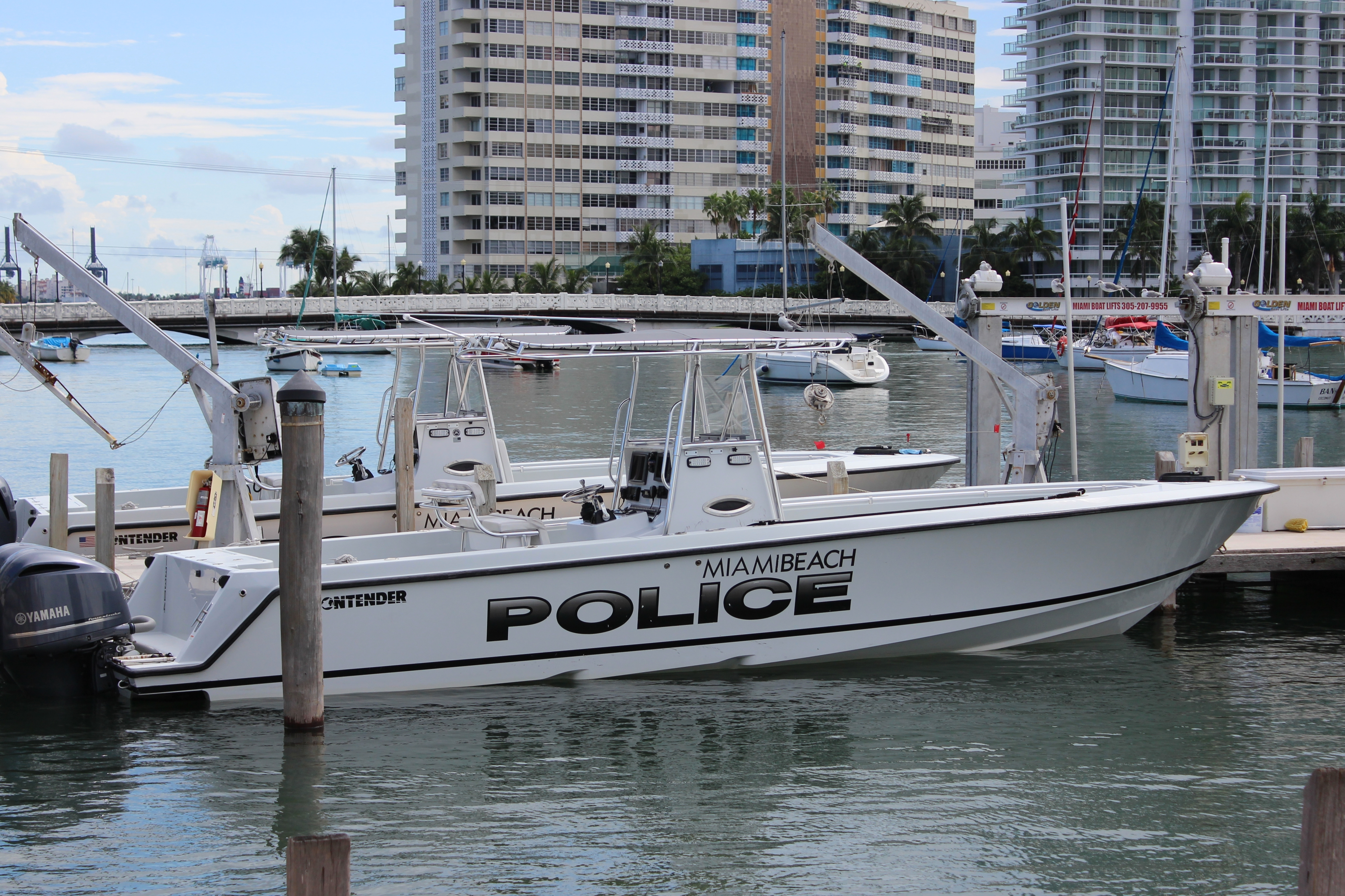
Miami Beach Marine Patrol Boat

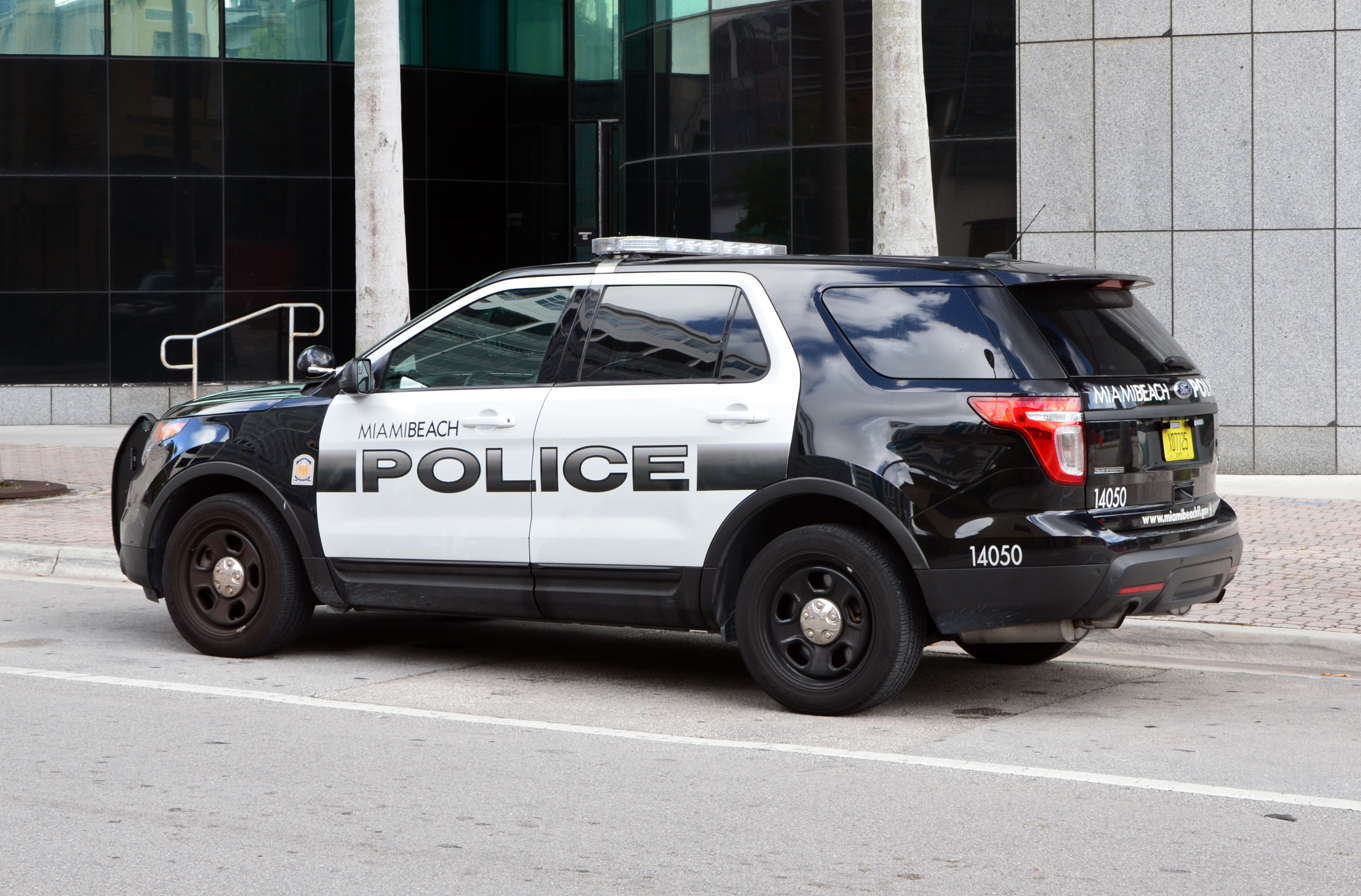
Miami Beach Police Vehicle
