= Cyclone Business Jet =

Cyclone Business Jet (CBJ) is an undergraduate student organization at Iowa State University, undertaking the task of designing and constructing a prototype 10-passenger commuter or business class jet airplane. It is composed mostly of Aerospace Engineer majors, however there are also Mechanical and Civil Engineers as well as Design majors. Emphasis is taken in designing for lower cost and greater fuel range. Teams are broken off into three sub-groups: the Aerodynamics Team, Performance Team, and Structures Team. The goal of Cyclone Business Jet is to apply classroom acquired skills to a real life problem with a finished product in mind.

== History ==
Cyclone Business Jet was started around 2004 by, Matt Eller. Eller Enterprises, Inc. purchased rights to a business jet stuck in design phases from a company in Brazil. The project was then given to Iowa State University to finish. Dr. Dayal and Mr. Eller formed the club by offering undergraduate students a unique opportunity: designing a production business jet.

Language barriers and translation issues plagued the first years of CBJ's existence. Most of the research and designing already completed was in Portuguese. After several semesters of translation some good information surfaced. The most recent data for the shape of the airplane and the external skin was compiled and converted from CATIA to Solidworks. From this a wind tunnel model was designed.

Currently the final design for the wind tunnel model is being printed using Iowa State University Aerospace Department's Rapid Prototyping Machine. The machine uses ABS plastic and support material to construct the individual parts. It "prints" or lays down the materials at thicknesses close to 1/1000 of an inch. Once finished all the parts will be assembled and then tested in Iowa State University's largest wind tunnel.

== Aerodynamics Team ==
The Aerodynamics Group of Cyclone Business Jet is made up of approximately 35 students. Current work includes constructing a scale model of the aircraft to use for wind tunnel testing, as well as displaying in public to represent Cyclone Business Jet. Upon completion the model will be tested in the AABL (Aerodynamic / Atmospheric Boundary Layer) Wind Tunnel in Howe Hall for wind tunnel testing, previously unused by any club at ISU.

The model to be used in the wind tunnel could not simply be copy and pasted, then printed. The entire aircraft was scaled down from full size to fit in the wind tunnel. The fuselage, wings, and tail were broken into smaller parts that could be printed in ISU's rapid prototyping machine. Each part was redesigned for optimal weight and strength to lighten the wind tunnel model without sacrificing durability.

Data from the wind tunnel is collected using a JR3 force balance. It is capable of reading forces and moments in the x, y, and z axes, also known and six degrees of freedom. The size of the model requires that the JR3 unit be placed inside the aircraft rather that behind, otherwise the weight of the model is likely to exceed the limits of the JR3 unit. The result is a bulkhead constructed of aluminum that will connect the JR3 to the wings and fuselage.

== Performance Team ==
The Performance Group is assigned the task of analyzing how the Cyclone Business Jet will fly and react to piloting. There are many aspects of the Cyclone Business Jet to be evaluated, such as aircraft stability, minimum and maximum operating speeds, flight loads, rate of climb, and maximum altitude. The team consists of approximately 19 students of all levels of Aerospace Engineering experience. By combining data from the Aerodynamics and Structures groups, the Performance group can determine how the Cyclone Business Jet will perform in flight.

== Structures Team ==
The Structures Team is assigned the task of utilizing ANSYS to determine weak points on the plane. This team is considered an entryway into the club for new or inexperienced students in regards aerospace engineering software, with tasks such as modeling the fuselage of the Cyclone Business Jet and load it into ANSYS, a finite element analysis program that can determine the stresses in all parts of the plane.

== Design Team ==
The Design Group consist of a handful of talented undergraduate design students at Iowa State University. The Team is charged with creating a logo to represent CBJ, both in the professional world as well as on ISU campus. Other work includes aircraft paint schemes and apparel. It has been undecided what the inside of the Business Jet will have. As a result the design team may, in the future, draw concepts of luxury and economical ideas able to house ten passengers.
