= Saab Bofors Dynamics CBJ-MS =

CBJ-MS
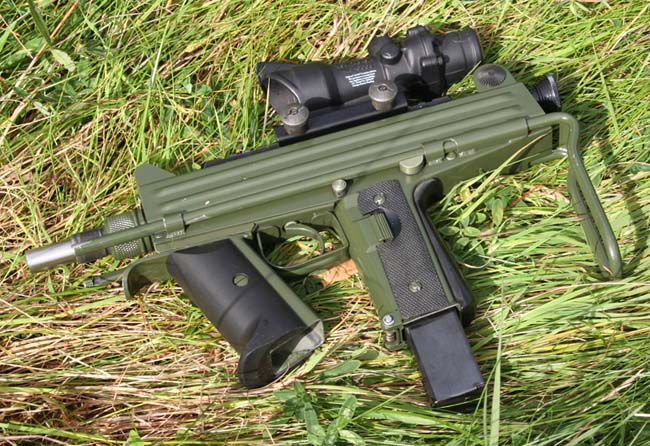
- CBJ-MS with retracted wire stock.
- Type: Submachine gun Personal defense weapon
- Place of origin: Sweden

Production history
- Designer: Carl Bertil Johansson
- Designed: Early 2000s
- Manufacturer: CBJ Tech AB; Saab Bofors Dynamics

Specifications
- Mass: 2.8 kg (6.2 lb) (empty); 3.05 kg (6.7 lb) (loaded, 30-round magazine)
- Length: 363 mm (14.3 in) (stock retracted); 565 mm (22.2 in) (stock extended)
- Barrel length: 200 mm (7.9 in)
- Width: 44 mm (1.7 in)
- Height: 189 mm (7.4 in) (with 20-round magazine); 240 mm (9.4 in) (with 30-round magazine)
- Cartridge: 6.5×25mm CBJ; 9×19mm Parabellum
- Action: Blowback, open bolt
- Rate of fire: 700 rounds/min
- Muzzle velocity: 2,723 ft/s (830 m/s)
- Effective firing range: 150 m (490 ft)
- Maximum firing range: 400 m (1,300 ft)
- Feed system: 20- or 30-round detachable box magazine 100-round detachable drum magazine
- Sights: Adjustable open iron sights Optical sights (Picatinny rail)

The Saab Bofors Dynamics CBJ-MS is a personal defense weapon/submachine gun designed and manufactured by Swedish weapon developer CBJ Tech AB, and was also manufactured by Saab Bofors Dynamics. It can be chambered for both 6.5×25mm CBJ and 9×19mm Parabellum cartridges via simple barrel changes.

CBJ-MS stands for Carl Bertil Johansson's-Modular System.

== History ==
The CBJ-MS ("Modular System") was first shown in August 2000. It is an unusual weapon in several respects, not the least because it is meant to fulfill the roles of a personal defense weapon, an assault rifle and (with the addition of a proprietary bipod and 100-round drum magazine) a squad automatic weapon.

Saab Bofors was involved in the production of the CBJ-MS, but left the project after the British did not see an interest to potentially acquire the submachine gun.

== Development ==
The gun features a top-mounted Picatinny rail for mounting optics, a progressive trigger for semi- and fully automatic fire, a collapsing wire stock, a grip safety, a threaded barrel, and a hollow foregrip which can be used to hold a spare magazine. The mechanism is based on the Uzi. It can be equipped with optical sights on the picatinny rail.

The CBJ-MS is capable of being field-converted to fire one of two types of ammunition. For the purely military role, the weapon fires the proprietary 6.5×25mm CBJ PDW cartridge; but by simply changing the barrel, it can fire 9×19mm Parabellum ammunition for law enforcement, training and other security operations. The 6.5×25mm CBJ cartridge has the same overall dimensions as the 9×19mm cartridge, can be used in the same magazines and generates the same level of recoil.

The projectile used by the 6.5×25mm CBJ can be a normal ball bullet, but can also be a 4 mm tungsten kinetic penetrator held inside a non-disintegrating plastic sabot, fired at a high muzzle velocity of 815 m/s (2,670 ft/s) with the ability to defeat most contemporary body armours. It is also claimed to be effective against light vehicle armors on armoured personnel carriers (APCs). Advantages claimed for the 6.5×25mm CBJ cartridge include a high impact velocity, a high hit probability due to the flat trajectory, high energy transfer to the target, and low levels of barrel wear and corrosion.

During trials, the 6.5×25mm CBJ round completely penetrated through the standard CRISAT vest at a range of 230 metres (750 ft). It is claimed that it is superior than the 5.7x28mm FN and 4.6×30mm HK round out of the FN P90 and HK MP7.

Current cartridge cases are being developed using aluminium. Each 6.5×25mm CBJ cartridge weighs 4.5 grams (0.16 oz) and has an overall length of 29.7 millimetres (1.17 in). The projectile weight is 2 grams (0.071 oz). The effective range of the cartridge is stated to be up to 400 metres (1,300 ft).
