= 6.5×25mm CBJ =

Swedish pistol cartridge

- Place of origin: Sweden

Production history
- Manufacturer: CBJ Tech AB
- Variants: CBJ; CBJ ST (spoon tip); CBJ HET (high energy transfer); CBJ subsonic AP; CBJ TRP (training reduced penetration); CBJ frangible CBJ Blank; CBJ drill

Specifications
- Parent case: 9×19mm Parabellum
- Case type: Rimless, bottleneck
- Bullet diameter: 0.157 in (4.0 mm)
- Overall length: 1.169 in (29.7 mm)
- Primer type: Small pistol

The 6.5×25mm CBJ is a firearm cartridge designed by CBJ Tech AB, a Swedish weapon development company based in Kungsbacka, for its CBJ-MS submachine gun/personal defence weapon.

== Design ==
Named after CBJ Tech AB's founder and president Carl Bertil Johansson, the 6.5×25mm CBJ has the same functional dimensions as the 9×19mm Parabellum and was designed to produce the same recoil and pressures to allow most 9 mm caliber weapons to be converted to 6.5×25mm CBJ with a simple barrel change. Also, because the 6.5×25mm CBJ has the same overall dimensions as the 9×19mm Parabellum, it can be used in the same magazines. The primary loading of the standard ball round fires a saboted 2 g (31 gr), 4 mm (0.16 in) diameter tungsten kinetic penetrator, weighing a total of 2.5 g (39 gr) with the sabot. It has a muzzle velocity of 730 m/s (2,400 ft/s) from a 120 mm (4.7 in) barrel with a muzzle energy of 533 J (393 ft⋅lb).

From a 300 mm (12 in) barrel, it has a muzzle velocity of 900 m/s (3,000 ft/s) with a muzzle energy of 810 J (600 ft⋅lb), and has good armor penetration out to 400 m (440 yd). The standard saboted tungsten ball, when fired from a 300 mm (12 in) length barrel, can pierce 9 mm (0.35 in) of armor plate and leave a 6 mm (0.24 in) diameter entry hole. Against the same plate, both 5.56×45mm NATO SS109 and 7.62×51mm NATO M80 failed to penetrate. From a 300 mm (12 in) barrel, the tungsten saboted round has the same trajectory as a 5.56 NATO from an M4 carbine and a velocity of 578 m/s (1,900 ft/s) at 300 m (328 yd), which will penetrate CRISAT armor. The 6.5×25mm CBJ brass-jacketed ball rounds are heavier than similar rounds in the FN 5.7×28mm and HK 4.6×30mm. From a Glock pistol, the round is capable of penetrating 7 mm (0.28 in) armor plate.

There are several other 6.5×25mm CBJ bullets other than the sabot in full-caliber. Military rounds include a "spoon-tip" loading that increases the chance of the bullet to cavitate on impact and a cheap training version with a different core material. Police rounds include a 2.5 g (39 gr) high-energy-transfer round that can penetrate CRISAT armor up to 50 m (55 yd), and a frangible round for training and situations requiring minimal barrier penetration. A subsonic armor-piercing round for use with a suppressor weighs 8 g (120 gr).

== Platforms ==
Name	Year	Reference
Saab Bofors Dynamics CBJ-MS	early 2000s	
Brügger & Thomet MP9	2010	
Glock 17 rechambering kit		
SIG Sauer SP 2022 rechambering kit		
MP5K rechambering kit		
