= B&T =

Swiss defence supplier (company)

- Type: AG
- Industry: Defence
- Founded: May 1991; 35 years ago
- Founder: Karl Brügger, Heinrich Thomet
- Headquarters: Thun, Switzerland
- Area served: Worldwide
- Key people: Karl Brügger (CEO)
- Products: Firearms, Ammunitions, Accessories, Clothing
- Services: Import, export, trade, manufacturing
- Number of employees: 70
- Website: bt-ag.ch/en

B&T AG, formerly Brügger & Thomet AG, is a Swiss defence supplier specializing in the design and manufacturing of firearms and tactical components like sound suppressors and rail systems. The company is based in Thun southeast of Bern, Switzerland.

== Overview ==
B&T consists of a trading and a manufacturing division. The trading division works mainly to supply the domestic law enforcement and military market, representing global companies in the industry including Heckler & Koch, Aimpoint, SureFire, and others. The company is also involved in the import and export of other war material including small arms, ammunition and related accessories.

Brügger & Thomet AG was established in May 1991 by Karl Brügger and Heinrich Thomet to produce suppressors for the domestic Swiss market. In 1997, Brügger & Thomet was converted into an AG. In the fall of 2005, Heinrich Thomet withdrew from the enterprise and sold his shares to Brügger, who remains the sole owner of B&T. The company was ISO 9001:2008 certified in 2005. The company name was changed to B&T AG in 2011. B&T reported 50 employees in 2014, and 70 employees in 2017.

In 2004, Brügger & Thomet started to produce its own line of complete weapons, beginning with a revised variant of the 9mm Steyr TMP known as the MP9 submachine gun, and a civilian semi-automatic model called the TP9. This would later be accompanied by the 7.62mm APR308 sniper rifle and the long-range APR338 version chambered in .338 Lapua Magnum. In 2006, B&T released the GL06 40×46mm grenade launcher, with the APC9 submachine gun being released in 2011. B&T is also a parts supplier for many other major manufacturers. The manufacturing branch specializes in the design and production of firearms, suppressors and modular accessory mounts for wide array of small arms. The company owns an extensive collection of almost 500 different types of firearms which it uses for reference in developing new products. The firm's production facility consists of 17 CNC workstations and nine conventional workstations for prototyping work.

In March 2019, B&T released its APC9 Pro model which improved upon the previous design with a non reciprocating charging handle and a replaceable pistol grip compatible with grips designed for the AR-15 style rifle family of firearms. The APC9 Pro will feature an optional lower receiver capable of using Glock magazines. In 2020 B&T released its APC10 model in the 10mm Auto. On 20 March 2019, B&T was awarded a contract in the U.S. Army's Sub Compact Weapon Production-Other Transaction Agreement (P-OTA) competition for its APC9K submachine gun. The $2.6 million contract includes an initial 350 subcompact weapons (SCW) with an option for additional quantities of up to 1,000 SCWs, with slings, manuals, accessories, and spare parts.

B&T USA is an importer of B&T firearms based in Tampa, Florida.

== Social ==
B&T AG is the main sponsor of the Swiss ice hockey club SCL Tigers. Karl "Käru" Brügger himself is a member of the Board of Directors of SCL Tigers; he is particularly committed to promoting young people as the president of the SCL Young Tigers.

== Controversies and criticism ==
On August 22, 2006, Heinrich Thomet was placed on the State Department’s watch list of potential arms traffickers. Thomet was closely associated with AEY, an arms procurement firm run by Efraim Diveroli and David Packouz. The two later pleaded guilty to conspiracy to defraud the United States in 2011. As a well-established arms broker Heinrich Thomet maintained connections with Albanian arms traffickers, paying them kickbacks for each US military contract that AEY fulfilled. The decades-old ammunition AEY sourced in Albania was Chinese, something that was in violation of US embargo rules established after the 1989 Tiananmen Square massacre.

Between 2008 and 2009, Heinrich Thomet was involved in importation of MAG58 parts, originating from sanctioned Zimbabwe Defence Industries into the United States through Montenegro, while U.S. laws prohibit transactions with individuals or entities of Zimbabwe under sanctions.

The Brügger & Thomet APR (licensed Ukrainian production) was used by Ukrainian security forces against the Ukrainian people during the Euromaidan demonstrations. Evidence of their use by the Yanukovych regime's snipers is documented in photos and video recordings. In 2009, the Swiss State Secretariat for Economic Affairs (SECO) approved Brügger & Thomet's "know-how transfer for the manufacture of small arms to a Ukrainian company," a SECO spokeswoman confirmed to the Swiss SonntagsZeitung. In addition, individual parts for the manufacture of around 30 to 50 sniper rifles were also shipped from Thun to Ukraine. These rifles were purchased to provide protection during the 2012 UEFA European Football Championship. In an interview of Ukraine expert Ievgen Vorobiov conducted by SonntagsZeitung, Vorobiov concludes that Viktor Yanukovych had used Euro 2012 in a targeted manner to upgrade the security forces. Karl Brügger, managing director of Brügger & Thomet quote: "We can assure you that all exports of weapon parts or licenses have been approved by the Seco." Brügger did not want to comment on the use of their weapons.

The French police used the GL06 launcher during the 2018/2019 Yellow vests movement and various demonstrators received serious injuries. In a statement on B&T website, the company denied its culpability in the injuries, citing that wrong type of ammo by unknown company could "increase the risk of injury considerably and makes the thrower less accurate".

== List of firearms produced by B&T ==
- KH-9
- USW-P
- USW-SF
- BWC
- P26
- TP380 - semi-automatic pistol
- VP9/Station SIX - integrally-suppressed bolt-action pistol based on the Welrod pistol
- MP9/TP9 - submachine gun, revised release of Steyr TMP
- APC9/10/40/45 PRO - submachine gun, available in various calibers
- SPC9 - semi-automatic pistol carbine, M4/AR style charging handle
- GHM9 - semi-automatic pistol carbine, even more streamlined version of APC SMG
- APC223/556 - 5.56mm Assault Rifle
- APC308 - 7.62mm Battle Rifle
- APR308/338 - bolt-action rifle, available either .308 Winchester or .338 Lapua Magnum
- SPR300 - integrally-suppressed bolt-action rifle
- GL06 - adopted by French police as LBD40
