= Prugger =

Prugger is a surname. Notable people with the surname include:

- Lydia Prugger (born 1969), Austrian ski mountaineer
- Thomas Prugger (born 1971), Italian snowboarder
