= Christian Marketplace =

UK magazine

Christian Marketplace (formerly known as the Christian Bookstore Journal and the European Christian Bookstore Journal) was the UK-based trade magazine for the Christian retail industry, featuring news, product reviews and interviews. It was published monthly from 2001 to 2012 and was supplied to both Christian and general market retailers.

== History ==
The magazine began in 1996 as the Christian Bookstore Journal. It was published on a monthly basis. This was soon renamed to the European Christian Bookstore Journal (ECBJ) and was located at the offices of the unofficial European branch of the Christian Booksellers Association. At this time the magazine was run by John Macdonald who also owned the Christian World Centre bookstore in Manchester, England.

In 1999, with the magazine facing bankruptcy, John MacDonald and SilverFish Publishing entered into a joint venture to replace ECBJ with a new magazine called Christian Bookseller. However, after the publication of the first issue, the parties entered into a dispute, with the result that SilverFish published a new magazine also entitled Christian Bookseller. Edited by Ian Matthews (also edited ECBJ in 1998), the magazine changed its name in March 2001 to Christian Retailer.

SilverFish went out of business in July 2001, and the magazine ceased at this point. In August 2001, Ian Matthews and Phil Whittall (another former employee of SilverFish), formed a new company called Sojourn Publications. They released a new incarnation of the magazine, titled Christian Marketplace. The title was eventually sold to Premier Media Group, who also ran Premier Radio in 2002, where it was edited by Phil Whittall until August 2006. The editor was Clem Jackson.

The last issue of Christian Marketplace was published in September 2012.
