= Brügger & Thomet VP9 =

Swiss integrally suppressed pistol

VP9
- Type: Bolt action suppressed pistol
- Place of origin: Switzerland

Production history
- Designer: Brügger & Thomet
- Unit cost: $2,100
- Produced: 2014–

Specifications
- Mass: 900 g (32 oz); 920 g (32 oz) (SIX-9)
- Length: 285 mm (11.2 in)
- Barrel length: 50 mm (2.0 in) (Barrel); 80 mm (3.1 in) (SIX-9 Barrel) 154 mm (6.1 in) (Suppressor)
- Height: 114 mm (4.5 in) (VP9); 142 mm (5.6 in) (SIX-9); 63 mm (2.5 in) (VP9 magazine removed)
- Diameter: 35 mm (1.4 in) (suppressor section); 130 mm (5.1 in) (barrel section)
- Cartridge: 9×19 Parabellum, .45 ACP (SIX-45 Only)
- Action: Bolt-action
- Effective firing range: approximately 5 meters
- Feed system: 5-round detachable box magazine/pistol grip; 8-round detachable magazine (SIX-45 only)
- Sights: Open iron sights (100 mm length)

The Brügger & Thomet VP9 (Veterinary Pistol 9mm) is a manually repeating, magazine-fed, integrally-suppressed pistol created by Brügger & Thomet (now B&T) for use as a veterinary pistol for putting down sick and wounded animals. The design is based on the Welrod pistol.

== Design ==
The design is heavily based on the Welrod pistol designed by the Special Operations Executive (SOE) for use in World War II and is mechanically almost identical. Its original purpose was to quickly and humanely kill sick animals without frightening nearby animals or people. B&T first produced the pistol when approached by a customer requesting 25 bolt-action suppressed pistols. B&T suggested using the Welrod design but adapting it for 9 mm which the customer agreed to. Initially only 30 were made, 25 for the customer and 5 for hobby use by B&T employees, but production and sales were expanded when it was realized that there was a market for such a pistol.

== Variants ==
Beginning in 2021, Brügger & Thomet began importing a version of the pistol to the United States as the Station SIX-9. To comply with American handgun regulations, the barrel length was increased and the grip was lengthened. The integral suppressor included with the gun is of a wipe-style design; additionally, a metal-baffle training suppressor is available. A second .45 ACP variant called the Station SIX-45 with a further lengthened grip and feeding from M1911 magazines was also announced.
