= Brügger & Thomet GL06 =

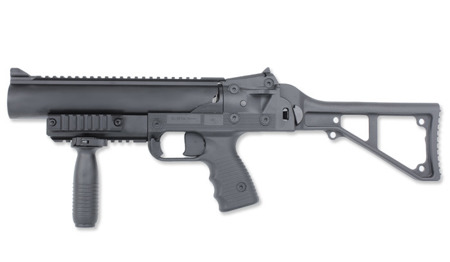
- Type: Grenade launcher Riot gun
- Place of origin: Switzerland

Production history
- Designer: Brügger & Thomet
- Designed: 2006
- Manufacturer: Brügger & Thomet
- Variants: LL06

Specifications
- Mass: 2.05 kg (4.52 lb)
- Length: 590 mm (23.2 in) stock extended / 385 mm (15.2 in) stock folded
- Barrel length: 280 mm (11.0 in)
- Width: 60 mm (2.4 in) stock extended / 95 mm (3.7 in) stock folded
- Height: 200 mm (7.9 in)
- Caliber: 40×46 mm (1.8 in)
- Action: Break action
- Muzzle velocity: 85 m/s (279 ft/s)
- Effective firing range: 300 m (980 ft)
- Feed system: Breech-loaded, single-shot
- Sights: Ghost ring iron sights 339 mm (13.3 in) sight radius Picatinny rail

The Brügger & Thomet GL06 is a dedicated stand-alone shoulder-fired 40×46 mm (1.8 in) grenade launcher intended for military and police applications.

== History ==
The GL06 was developed in 2006 in response to a request from the French National Police which sought to obtain a less-lethal weapon for anti-riot application with the particular need for pin-point accuracy at standoff ranges (beyond 40 m (130 ft) for such scenarios) when firing impact rounds. The Thun-based Brügger & Thomet (B&T) company provided its client with both a weapon and a special round, with the added benefit of compatibility with a wide array of lethal and less-lethal ammunition produced in the 40 mm (1.6 in) low-velocity class.

== Design ==
The GL06 is a stand-alone shoulder-firing weapon intended for military and police applications. A special "less-lethal" version of GL06 was produced as the LL06. Although the LL06 was marketed as a variation of the GL06, the only difference is the bright yellow color of the frame, compared to the standard black of the GL06. Both weapons are fully capable of firing a complete range of lethal and less-lethal 40×46 mm (1.8 in) ammunition.

The GL06 is lighter and more compact than other stand-alone weapons of the same class (such as the US M79 or German HK69A1), yet it is capable of greater accuracy, tactical flexibility and has good ergonomics.

== Production ==
The GL06 is also produced by four different manufacturers around the world.

== Users ==
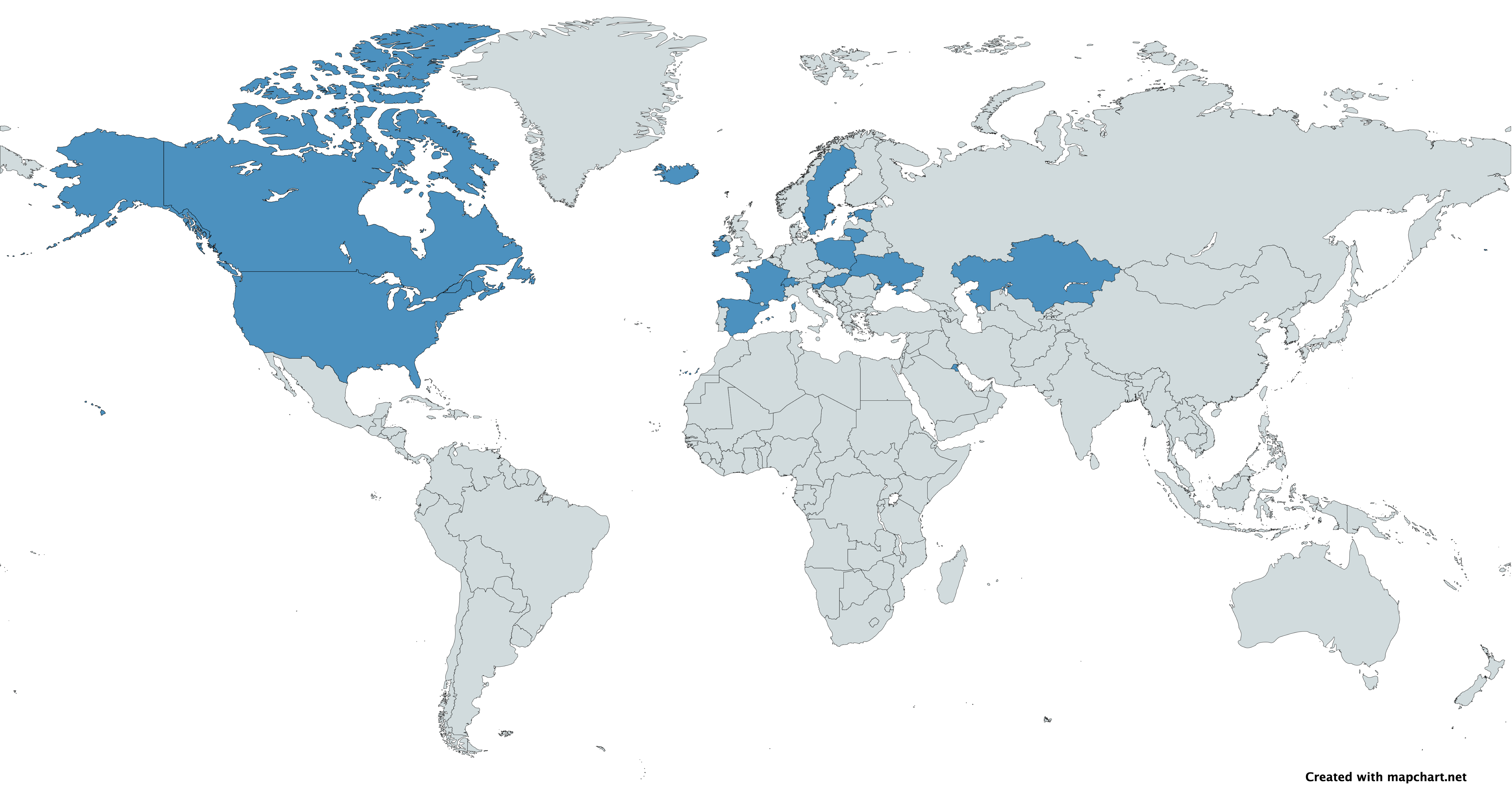
Map with Brügger & Thomet GL06 users in blue

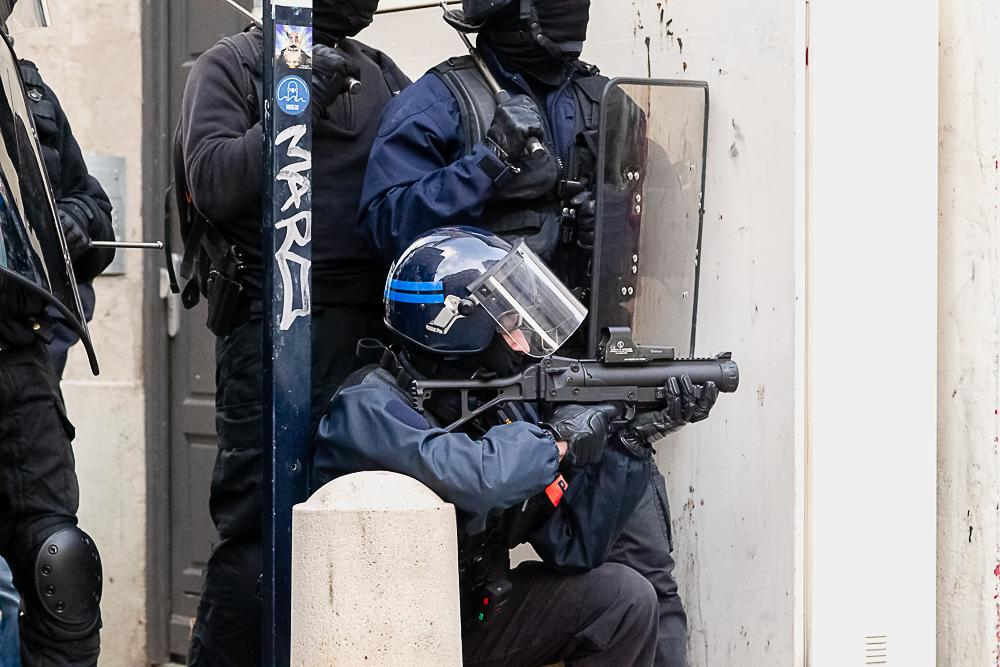
GL06 in use during the yellow vests protests in France

- Canada: several police departments: Sûreté du Québec (SR), Service de police de la Ville de Montréal, Toronto Police Service
- Estonia: Estonian Defence Forces
- France: Police Nationale (since 2008), Gendarmerie Nationale and others
- Hungary: Hungary Police
- Iceland: Viking Squad
- Ireland: Garda Síochána: Garda Emergency Response Unit (ERU) and Armed Support Units (ASU)
- Kazakhstan: Kazakh Police
- Kuwait: Kuwait Police
- Lithuania: Lithuanian Police
- New Zealand: New Zealand Police
- Poland: Policja
- Slovenia: Slovenian National Police Force
- Spain: Mossos d'Esquadra, Ertzaintza
- Sweden: Swedish Police Authority
- Switzerland: several police departments
- USA: U.S. Customs and Border Protection

=== Others ===
Between one and seven B&T Gl-06 and LL-06 have been exported in other countries: Italy, Bosnia and Herzegovina, Island, Serbia, United Kingdom, Belgium, Netherlands, Austria, Germany, Portugal, Oman, South Africa, Malaysia, Kenya and United Arab Emirates.
