= Brügger & Thomet MP9 =

MP9
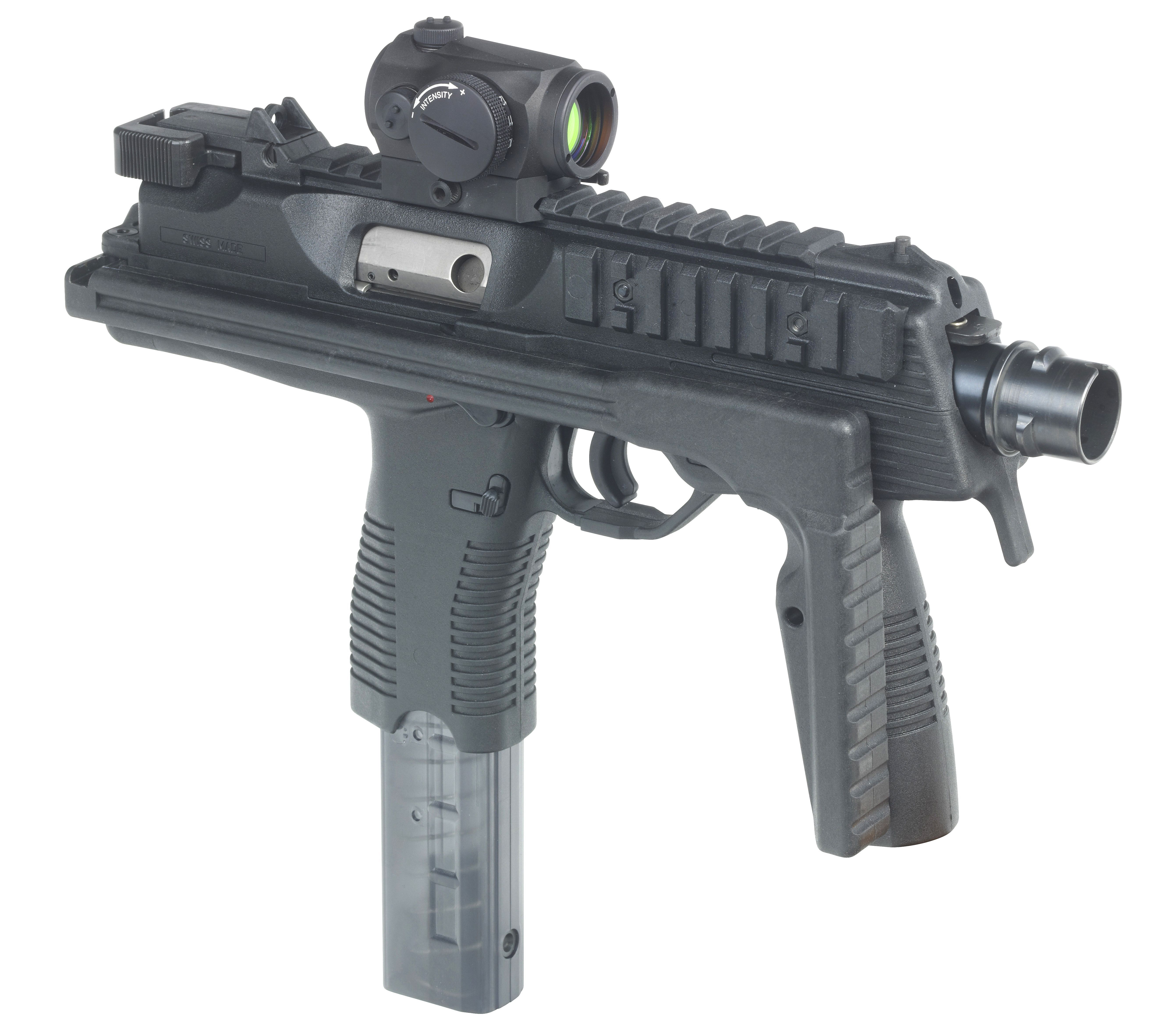
- Type: Submachine gun
- Place of origin: Switzerland

Service history
- In service: 2004–present
- Used by: See Users
- Wars: War in Afghanistan

Production history
- Designer: Brügger & Thomet
- Designed: 2001
- Manufacturer: Brügger & Thomet
- Produced: 2001–present
- Variants: See Variants

Specifications
- Mass: 3 lbs (1.4 kg)
- Length: 20.6 in (520 mm) (stock extended)
- Barrel length: 130 mm (5.1 in)
- Width: 45 mm (1.8 in) (stock extended)
- Height: 246 mm (9.7 in) (with 30-round magazine)
- Cartridge: 9×19mm Parabellum; 6.5×25mm CBJ; .45 ACP (MP45)
- Action: Short recoil, locking rotating barrel
- Rate of fire: 900 RPM
- Muzzle velocity: 400 m/s (1,312 ft/s)
- Effective firing range: 100 m (328 ft)
- Feed system: 15, 20, 25, or 30 round transparent box magazine
- Sights: Ghost-ring sights; Fully adjustable MIL-STD 1913 Picatinny rail; Tritium-illuminated handgun night sights

The Brügger & Thomet MP9 (German: Maschinenpistole 9mm, lit. 'Machine pistol 9mm') is a submachine gun chambered for the 9×19mm Parabellum cartridge that is designed and manufactured by Brügger & Thomet.

== Design ==
The MP9 is a development of the Steyr TMP, which was purchased from Steyr in 2001. Differences from the TMP include a stock that folds to the right side of the weapon, an integrated Picatinny rail, and a new trigger safety.

The MP9 is a selective-fire submachine gun. It uses 15, 20, 25, and 30 round transparent polymer detachable box magazines. It has three safeties: an ambidextrous safety/fire mode selector switch (manual safety), a trigger safety, and a drop safety.

The MP9 is made of polymer and is also corrosion-resistant. Its design and ease of operability allow the user to holster the weapon like a machine pistol or personal defense weapon for rapid deployment in self-defence.

Later variants (TP9-N, TP9-US, MP9-N, MP45) feature new ambidextrous two/three-position selectors. The old Steyr style cross-bolt push button selectors are replaced with new "HK" style selectors.

== Variants ==
=== MP9N ===
Improved MP9 variant, with "N" indicating a NATO-compliant configuration.

=== MP45 ===
MP9 chambered in .45 ACP.

=== MP9 6.5×25mm CBJ ===
A version chambered in 6.5×25mm CBJ was developed in 2010, requiring only a barrel change to accept the new caliber.

=== MP9-FX ===
Training variant.

=== TP9 ===
The TP9 is a semi-automatic civilian variant of the MP9.

Its design is similar to the Steyr SPP, but its differential feature is an underbarrel MIL-STD-1913 Picatinny Rail installed in front of the trigger guard, in place of the forward grip. This was to be done to comply with US firearm import laws.

==== TP9SF ====
The TP9SF is superficially similar to the TP9, though it is selective-fire rather than semi-auto only.

==== TP9-US ====
With the TP9-N, B&T decided to add an empty socket (which also includes the hand-stop) for the foregrip, instead of a picatinny rail as with the old TP9.

It also comes without a stock, but with an attachment point that can fit various folding or telescoping braces and stocks, should a customer decide to register it as a short-barreled rifle and add one.

==== TP9-N ====
The regular TP9-N is identical to the MP9-N, just without full-auto capability.

==== TP380 ====
A subcompact version of the TP9 in development, chambered in .380 ACP.

== Users ==
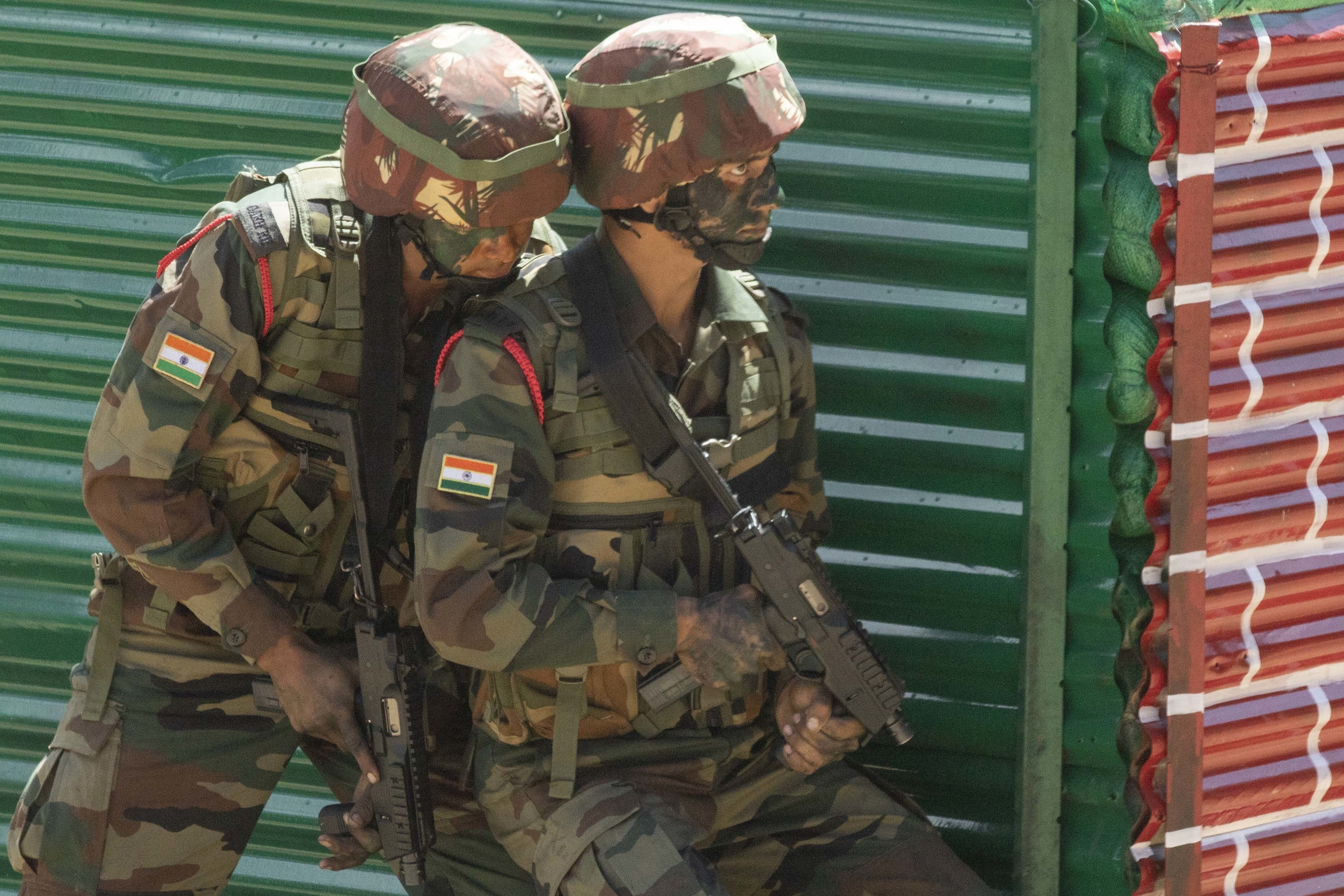
Indian Army Ghatak Platoon commandos armed with MP9S during a military exercise in 2018

- Belgium
  - Federal Police Special Units
- Bulgaria
  - Special forces
- France
  - RAID
  - Groupe de sécurité de la présidence de la République
- Greece
- India
  - Mumbai Police
  - Mizoram Police
  - Indian Army
    - Ghatak Platoons
    - Para SF
- Indonesia
  - Indonesian Army
    - Kopassus
  - Indonesian Navy
    - Kopaska
    - Taifib
    - Denjaka
- Israel
- Jamaica
  - Jamaica Constabulary Force
- Kazakhstan
- Lebanon
- Macau
  - Public Security Police Force
- Malaysia
  - PASKAU
- Mexico
- Morocco
- Netherlands
  - Royal Netherlands Air Force
- Philippines
- Poland
- Portugal
  - Portuguese Army
  - Special Actions Detachment
  - National Republican Guard
  - Maritime police
- Russia
  - FSB Alpha Group
- Romania
  - Brigada Specială de Intervenție a Jandarmeriei
- Saudi Arabia
- Singapore
- Spain
- South Korea
  - 707th Special Mission Group
- Switzerland
  - Swiss Army
  - Law enforcement in Switzerland
- Thailand
  - Department of Special Investigation
- Ukraine
  - Special Group "Alpha"
- United Kingdom
  - Police Scotland
- United States
  - Lake County, Indiana SWAT
- Vatican City
  - Swiss Guard
