= Ashley, North Dakota =

- City
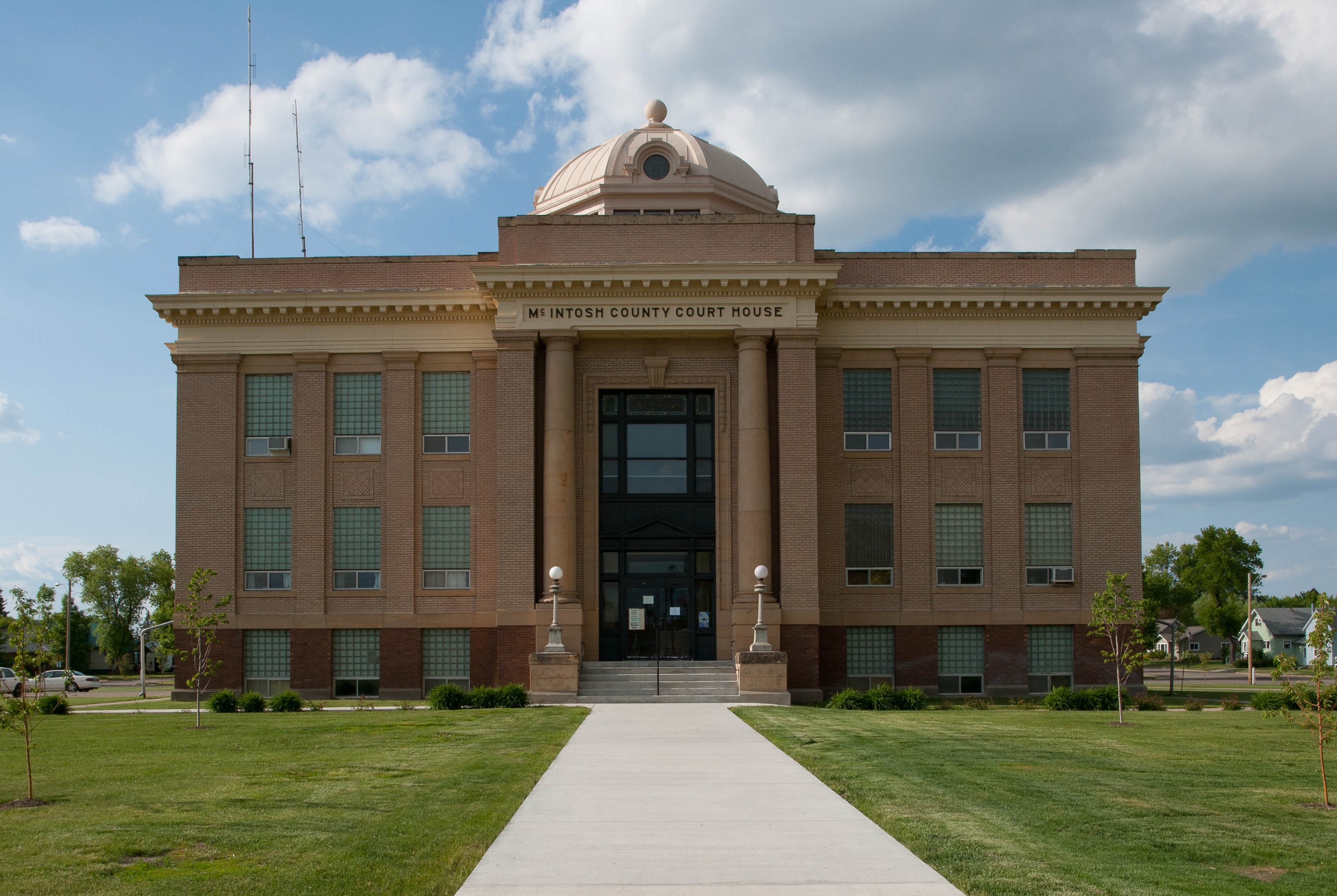
- The McIntosh County Courthouse in Ashley (June 2009)

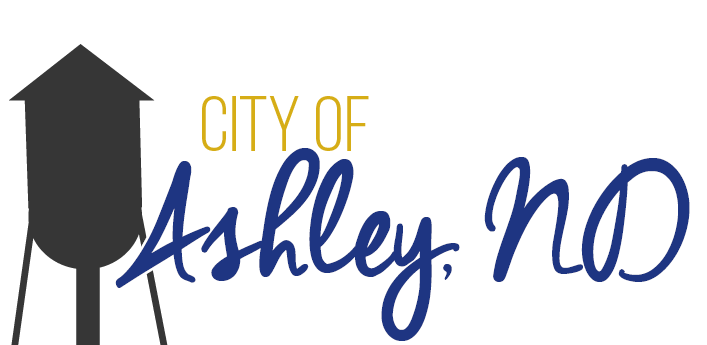
- Logo
- Interactive map of Ashley, North Dakota
- Location within North Dakota
- Coordinates: 46.0347°N 99.3737°W
- Country: United States
- State: North Dakota
- County: McIntosh
- Founded: 1888
- Incorporated (village): October 5, 1903
- Incorporated (city): January 9, 1920
- Named after: Ashley E. Morrow

Government
  - Type: Mayor–council
  - Mayor: Erich Schock
  - Council President: Travis Geiszler; Maggie Newhouse

Area
  - Total: 0.643 sq mi (1.665 km^{2})
  - Land: 0.643 sq mi (1.665 km^{2})
  - Water: 0 sq mi (0.000 km^{2}) 0.00%
- Elevation: 2,011 ft (613 m)

Population (2020)
  - Total: 613
  - Estimate (2025): 599
  - Density: 954/sq mi (368/km^{2})
- Time zone: UTC–6 (Central (CST))
  - Summer (DST): UTC–5 (CDT)
- ZIP Code: 58413
- Area code: 701
- FIPS code: 38-03540
- GNIS feature ID: 1035917
- Highways: ND 3, ND 11
- Website: ashley-nd.com

Ashley is a city in and the county seat of McIntosh County, North Dakota, United States. The population was 613 as of the 2020 census, and was estimated at 599 in 2025.

== History ==
Ashley was laid out in 1888 when the Minneapolis, St. Paul and Sault Ste. Marie Railroad was extended to that point. The city was named for Ashley E. Morrow, a railroad man. A post office has been in operation at Ashley since 1888. The McIntosh County Courthouse was built in 1919.

Some of the 1,200 Jews who immigrated to North Dakota from the Russian Empire settled under the Homestead Acts in and around Ashley from the 1880s to 1930s. A number of them were buried in the Ashley Jewish Homesteaders Cemetery, which was added to the National Register of Historic Places in 2015.

== Geography ==
According to the United States Census Bureau, the city has a total area of 0.643 square miles (1.67 km^{2}), all land.

== Climate ==
This climatic region is typified by large seasonal temperature differences, with warm to hot (and often humid) summers and cold (sometimes severely cold) winters. According to the Köppen Climate Classification system, Ashley has a warm-summer humid continental climate (Köppen Dfb), with an annual precipitation average of 20.74 inches (526.8 mm). Winters are frigid and dry with moderate snowfall, while summers are wetter and very warm with pleasant mornings.

Climate data for Ashley, North Dakota (1991–2020 normals, extremes 1893–present)
Month	Jan	Feb	Mar	Apr	May	Jun	Jul	Aug	Sep	Oct	Nov	Dec	Year
Record high °F (°C)	60 (16)	65 (18)	83 (28)	98 (37)	107 (42)	107 (42)	114 (46)	110 (43)	104 (40)	94 (34)	83 (28)	64 (18)	114 (46)
Mean maximum °F (°C)	42.5 (5.8)	46.3 (7.9)	61.9 (16.6)	77.9 (25.5)	85.2 (29.6)	90.1 (32.3)	95.3 (35.2)	94.5 (34.7)	90.4 (32.4)	80.7 (27.1)	63.0 (17.2)	45.9 (7.7)	97.8 (36.6)
Mean daily maximum °F (°C)	20.0 (−6.7)	24.4 (−4.2)	36.7 (2.6)	52.0 (11.1)	65.0 (18.3)	74.6 (23.7)	81.0 (27.2)	79.7 (26.5)	70.6 (21.4)	54.7 (12.6)	38.5 (3.6)	25.3 (−3.7)	51.9 (11.1)
Daily mean °F (°C)	10.6 (−11.9)	14.9 (−9.5)	26.9 (−2.8)	40.6 (4.8)	53.6 (12.0)	64.0 (17.8)	69.6 (20.9)	67.8 (19.9)	58.3 (14.6)	43.4 (6.3)	28.8 (−1.8)	16.7 (−8.5)	41.3 (5.2)
Mean daily minimum °F (°C)	1.3 (−17.1)	5.4 (−14.8)	17.0 (−8.3)	29.2 (−1.6)	42.3 (5.7)	53.3 (11.8)	58.3 (14.6)	55.9 (13.3)	46.0 (7.8)	32.2 (0.1)	19.0 (−7.2)	8.2 (−13.2)	30.7 (−0.7)
Mean minimum °F (°C)	−22.0 (−30.0)	−16.7 (−27.1)	−7.3 (−21.8)	13.1 (−10.5)	27.2 (−2.7)	41.7 (5.4)	47.2 (8.4)	44.3 (6.8)	30.7 (−0.7)	15.5 (−9.2)	0.6 (−17.4)	−13.9 (−25.5)	−24.9 (−31.6)
Record low °F (°C)	−43 (−42)	−48 (−44)	−36 (−38)	−10 (−23)	13 (−11)	22 (−6)	29 (−2)	26 (−3)	12 (−11)	−12 (−24)	−24 (−31)	−40 (−40)	−48 (−44)
Average precipitation inches (mm)	0.41 (10)	0.51 (13)	0.90 (23)	1.49 (38)	3.18 (81)	3.61 (92)	3.29 (84)	2.58 (66)	2.00 (51)	1.76 (45)	0.50 (13)	0.51 (13)	20.74 (527)
Average snowfall inches (cm)	7.9 (20)	6.0 (15)	7.5 (19)	4.6 (12)	0.0 (0.0)	0.0 (0.0)	0.0 (0.0)	0.0 (0.0)	0.0 (0.0)	2.3 (5.8)	4.9 (12)	9.2 (23)	42.4 (108)
Average precipitation days (≥ 0.01 in)	6.5	6.8	7.5	8.9	12.0	12.6	10.9	9.2	8.1	8.6	6.1	6.3	103.5
Average snowy days (≥ 0.1 in)	5.6	5.6	5.1	2.1	0.2	0.0	0.0	0.0	0.0	1.2	3.6	5.3	28.7
Source 1: National Oceanic and Atmospheric Administration
Source 2: National Centers for Environmental Information

== Demographics ==
Historical population
Census	Pop.	Note	%±
1910	682		—
1920	1,009		47.9%
1930	1,033		2.4%
1940	1,345		30.2%
1950	1,423		5.8%
1960	1,419		−0.3%
1970	1,236		−12.9%
1980	1,192		−3.6%
1990	1,052		−11.7%
2000	882		−16.2%
2010	749		−15.1%
2020	613		−18.2%
2025 (est.)	599		−2.3%
U.S. Decennial Census; 2020 Census

As of the 2024 American Community Survey, there were 347 estimated households in Ashley with an average of 1.66 persons per household. The city has a median household income of $42,540. Approximately 13.2% of the city's population lives at or below the poverty line. Ashley has an estimated 56.9% employment rate, with 15.4% of the population holding a bachelor's degree or higher and 87.4% holding a high school diploma. There were 508 housing units at an average density of 790.05 per square mile (305.0/km^{2}).

The top five reported languages (people were allowed to report up to two languages, thus the figures will generally add to more than 100%) were English (80.5%), Spanish (0.0%), Indo-European (13.5%), Asian and Pacific Islander (4.6%), and Other (1.4%).

The median age in the city was 60.3 years.

Ashley, North Dakota – racial and ethnic composition Note: the US Census treats Hispanic/Latino as an ethnic category. This table excludes Latinos from the racial categories and assigns them to a separate category. Hispanics/Latinos may be of any race.
Race / ethnicity (NH = non-Hispanic)	Pop. 1990	Pop. 2000	Pop. 2010	Pop. 2020	% 1990	% 2000	% 2010	% 2020
White alone (NH)	1,042	861	727	588	99.05%	97.62%	97.06%	95.92%
Black or African American alone (NH)	0	0	1	2	0.00%	0.00%	0.13%	0.33%
Native American or Alaska Native alone (NH)	4	3	1	0	0.38%	0.34%	0.13%	0.00%
Asian alone (NH)	5	7	4	3	0.48%	0.79%	0.53%	0.49%
Pacific Islander alone (NH)	—	0	0	0	—	0.00%	0.00%	0.00%
Other race alone (NH)	0	0	0	0	0.00%	0.00%	0.00%	0.00%
Mixed race or multiracial (NH)	—	3	13	18	—	0.34%	1.74%	2.94%
Hispanic or Latino (any race)	1	8	3	2	0.10%	0.91%	0.40%	0.33%
Total	1052	882	749	613	100.00%	100.00%	100.00%	100.00%

=== 2020 census ===
As of the 2020 census, there were 613 people, 327 households, and 142 families residing in the city. The population density was 953.34 inhabitants per square mile (368.09/km^{2}). There were 488 housing units at an average density of 758.94 per square mile (293.03/km^{2}). The racial makeup of the city was 96.08% White, 0.33% African American, 0.00% Native American, 0.49% Asian, 0.00% Pacific Islander, 0.16% from some other races and 2.94% from two or more races. Hispanic or Latino people of any race were 0.33% of the population.

=== 2010 census ===
As of the 2010 census, there were 749 people, 391 households, and 201 families residing in the city. The population density was 1,179.53 inhabitants per square mile (455.42/km^{2}). There were 520 housing units at an average density of 818.90 per square mile (316.18/km^{2}). The racial makeup of the city was 97.33% White, 0.13% African American, 0.13% Native American, 0.67% Asian, 0.00% Pacific Islander, 0.00% from some other races and 1.74% from two or more races. Hispanic or Latino people of any race were 0.40% of the population.

There were 391 households, of which 13.0% had children under the age of 18 living with them, 44.8% were married couples living together, 4.1% had a female householder with no husband present, 2.6% had a male householder with no wife present, and 48.6% were non-families. 45.5% of all households were made up of individuals, and 31% had someone living alone who was 65 years of age or older. The average household size was 1.80 and the average family size was 2.46.

The median age in the city was 64.3 years. 12.3% of residents were under the age of 18; 3% were between the ages of 18 and 24; 14% were from 25 to 44; 22% were from 45 to 64; and 48.6% were 65 years of age or older. The gender makeup of the city was 45.1% male and 54.9% female.

=== 2000 census ===
Languages (2000)	Percent
Spoke English at home	54.76%
Spoke German at home	45.24%

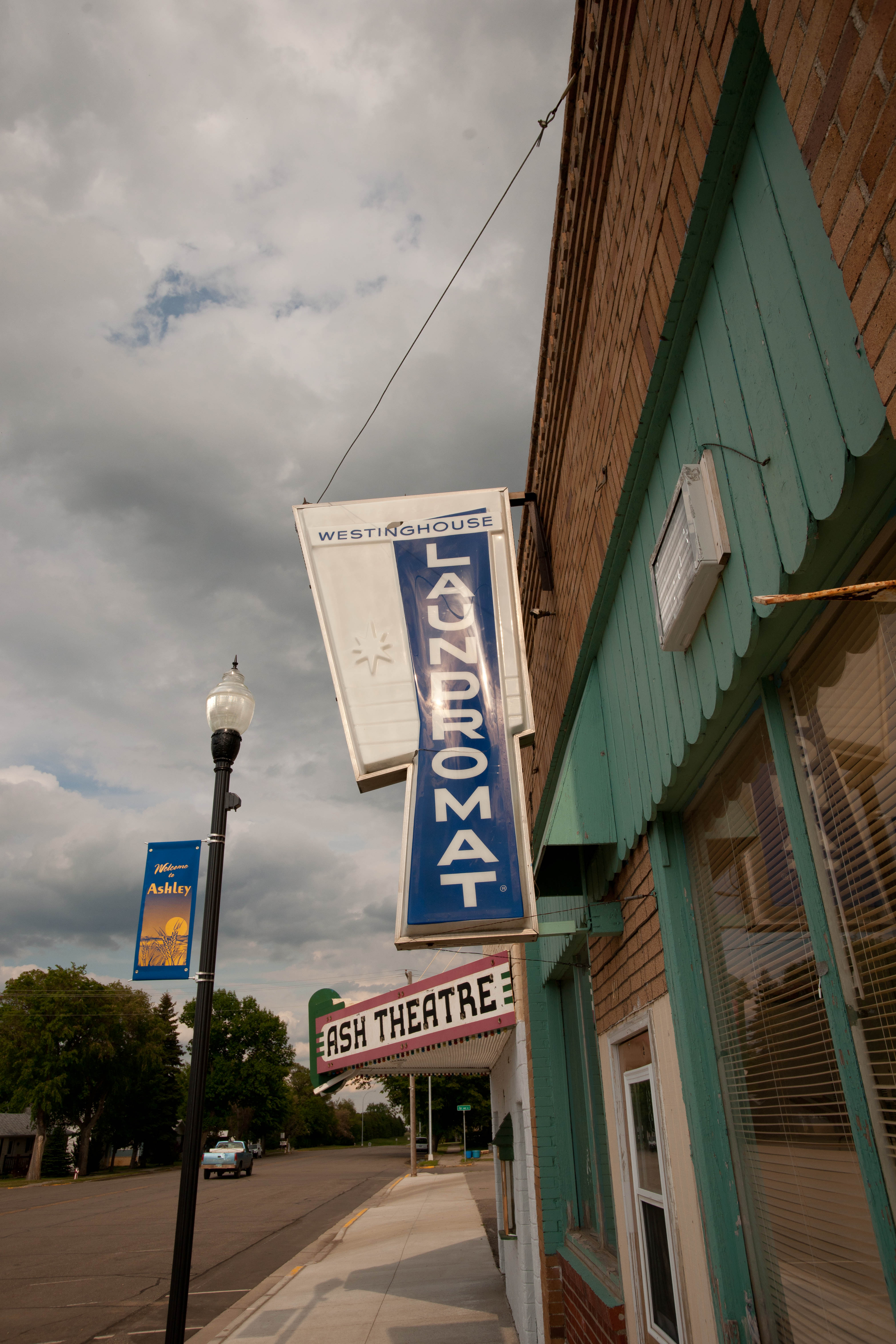
Westinghouse Laundromat and Ash Theatre

As of the 2000 census, there were 882 people, 436 households, and 258 families residing in the city. The population density was 1,404.86 inhabitants per square mile (542.42/km^{2}). There were 528 housing units at an average density of 841.01 per square mile (324.72/km^{2}). The racial makeup of the city was 98.41% White, 0.00% African American, 0.34% Native American, 0.91% Asian, 0.00% Pacific Islander, 0.00% from some other races and 0.34% from two or more races. Hispanic or Latino people of any race were 0.91% of the population.

The top 6 ancestry groups in the city are German (66.9%), Russian (15.1%), Norwegian (7.1%), United States (3.3%), English (2.3%), French (1.9%).

There were 436 households, out of which 12.6% had children under the age of 18 living with them, 54.1% were married couples living together, 3.2% had a female householder with no husband present, and 40.8% were non-families. 39.4% of all households were made up of individuals, and 25.7% had someone living alone who was 65 years of age or older. The average household size was 1.90 and the average family size was 2.49.

In the city, the population was spread out, with 12.0% under the age of 18, 4.2% from 18 to 24, 14.4% from 25 to 44, 21.2% from 45 to 64, and 48.2% who were 65 years of age or older. The median age was 64 years. For every 100 females, there were 82.2 males. For every 100 females age 18 and over, there were 83.0 males.

The median income for a household in the city was $18,015, and the median income for a family was $28,500. Males had a median income of $17,292 versus $14,783 for females. The per capita income for the city was $13,001. About 9.3% of families and 18.9% of the population were below the poverty line, including 9.3% of those under age 18 and 27.4% of those age 65 or over.

== Education ==
The Ashley Public School District 9

- Ashley High School (7-12) in Ashley
- Ashley Elementary School (PK-6) in Ashley

The area is served by the Ashley School District 9. It operates the Ashley School. In the 2025-26 academic year, the district reported a total of 134 students.

== Notable people ==
- David Berman (1903–1957), Las Vegas gambling pioneer and Jewish mob boss
- Frederick Herzog (1925–1995), theologian
- Bryan Klipfel, superintendent of the North Dakota Highway Patrol
