= Do Communists Have Better Sex? =

- Promotional image on Amazon Prime Video
- German: Liebte der Osten anders? Sex im geteilten Deutschland
- Directed by: André Meier
- Written by: André Meier
- Produced by: Heino Deckert; Irène Challand; Gaspard Lamunière
- Cinematography: André Böhm
- Edited by: Thomas Kleinwächter
- Music by: Mario Krauß
- Production companies: Ma.ja.de; Mitteldeutscher Rundfunk; Arte; Télévision Suisse Romande; SBS
- Distributed by: Deckert Distribution
- Release date: 27 November 2006
- Running time: 52 minutes
- Country: Germany
- Language: German

Do Communists Have Better Sex? (German: Liebte der Osten anders? – Sex im geteilten Deutschland) is a 2006 German documentary film directed by André Meier. It compares the sexuality manifested by Germans during the period being divided into a Western and an Eastern part. The hypothesis manifested by scholars, interviews and footage is that sex was more free and women had more sexual pleasure in East Germany. The film discusses the possible reasons, considering the differences between the ideology and practical politics of a capitalist and a self-proclaimed communist regime.

The film was produced by Ma.ja.de in association with television and radio broadcasters from Germany, France, Switzerland, and Australia. Broadcast first on German television ARD in 2006, it was exhibited at the 2007 Yamagata International Documentary Film Festival and released on DVD in the United States and Japan in 2007 and 2008 respectively. The work has received a divided response; praised for its positive image of East Germany and for being humorous and informative simultaneously, it was criticized for its animation usage, not providing in-depth analysis, and a lack of comprehensiveness for not treating non-heterosexual relationships.

== Content ==
The documentary depicts and compares the sexual lives of people from West and East Germany during the period from the division in 1949 to the fall of the Berlin Wall in 1989. The comparison uses statistical data collected in the months following the fall of the wall on sex practice, age of start, partner numbers and orgasm achievement, and through opinions on abortion, dating, divorce, marriage, the pill, pornography and sex education. The main theories advanced are that sex in the East was "earlier, better, [and] more often" than in the West, and that women had more pleasure in the communist state, as evidenced by the fact that East German women reported having twice as many orgasms as their West counterparts.

Among the reasons presented by the documentary is different attitudes towards sex caused by ideological reasons and practical politics. The West is described as under greater influence of traditional gender roles (i.e. women as housewives having certain duties to their husbands), the concept of family, a Church-driven morality, a taboo on discussing sex publicly or with children, a commercialization of sex (especially through pornography), and the idea of sex as a form of prestige. The East is characterized as more sexually liberal because of its disregard of gendered expectations of womanhood, its public, sex education, desexualized practices of nudism adopted by 90% of the population, and women's independence. This independence is attributed to their high level of employment and the public child-care system, and its consequent higher level of gender equality in economic terms, but also to easier divorce processes and uncomplicated access to contraception and abortion.

The documentary uses footage from the analyzed period and interviews conducted by the filmmakers with specialists in German history, culture and sexology: historians like Dagmar Herzog and Gisela Staupe, sex researcher Kurt Starke and cultural studies researcher Dietrich Mühlberg. The footage includes newsreel clips of sex education films and television programs, scenes of the everyday body, daily activities such as factory workers, people going to strip clubs, and DIY and amateur soft-core pornography. Interviews and footage are intertwined with sequences of square-headed cartoons.

== Production ==
The documentary was written and directed by André Meier, an East German art historian with background as editor of the art section of the newspaper Die Tageszeitung. Meier directed works about historical figures such as politician Walter Ulbricht and alchemist Johann Friedrich Böttger for the public broadcaster Mitteldeutscher Rundfunk (MDR). Do Communists Have Better Sex? was produced by the film company Ma.ja.de in association with television and radio broadcasters from different countries: MDR (Germany), Arte (France), Télévision Suisse Romande (Switzerland), and SBS (Australia).

The individual producers of the film were Heino Deckert, Irène Challand and Gaspard Lamunière. The music was composed by Mario Krauß, photography was done by André Böhm, and Thomas Kleinwächter was its editor. The animation sequences were provided by Motionworks.

== Release and response ==
The documentary was originally broadcast on German TV channel ARD on 27 November 2006. It was shown at the 2007 Yamagata International Documentary Film Festival as part of the program "Reconsidering the Postwar History of East and West Germany". The documentary was released in the United States in 2007 on DVD and VHS formats by Brooklyn-based distribution company First Run/Icarus Films. The original title, Liebte der Osten anders? Sex im geteilten Deutschland (translated as "Do Easterners love differently?" or "Did the East love differently? Sex in divided Germany"), was changed for the American distribution. In February 2008, it was broadcast nationwide in Australia by SBS. The film was released in Japan by Pandora on DVD on 21 June 2008.

While films such as The Lives of Others and Good Bye, Lenin! were criticized for depicting a distorted picture of everyday life in East Germany, the documentary was noted for providing a positive image of it. The film won the Video Editing Award of the 2007 Prix CIRCOM Regional Programme Award given by the European Association of Regional Television. The jury report considered it to be "witty, funny and at the same time full of new information", and praised how the editing ensured a good pace and flow to the mix of different types of material. David S. Hall, in a review for the Electronic Journal of Human Sexuality, called it "entertaining and informative" and said it is "a valuable addition to the history of sexuality", especially for the post-World War II period and because of its comparative nature. Jessica Schomberg, writing for Educational Media Reviews Online, commented it "provide[s] an often humorous, always informative comparison of Western and Communist sexual mores" and that it is useful for people studying sexual politics and sex education. Clare Morgan of The Sydney Morning Herald called it "frequently amusing". Anthropologist Kristen Ghodsee, in her book Red Hangover: Legacies of Twentieth-Century Communism, deemed it as a "wonderful reflection" on how capitalism and communism affected intimacy. Sophie Lewis, writing for The New Inquiry, called it "sharp and entertaining".

Charles Mudede of The Stranger said that "The only thing bad" about the film was the animation usage. Both Benita Blessing on H-Net and Anikó Szûcs, writing for Women & Performance, criticized the animation bits; the former commented that they did not provide any dramaturgical function being mere repetition of what is commented by interviewers, while the latter said it occupied space that could be used to provide "in-depth analyses of the private and public topic of sexuality and sexual mores" but instead offered "facile stereotypes that all too often leave one cringing in embarrassment". Overall, Szûcs was critical of the film, saying "it falls short of its comprehensive promise", exhibits propagandistic and manipulative aspects and lacks any discussion on homosexual relationships. The focus on heterosexual and monogamous relationships was also highlighted by Blessing and SBS's Jim Poe. Blessing considered it to be "a welcome addition" to discussions on the topic and said it "belongs in any university library". However, she noted it focused too much on women and did not approach men's relation to sex. She also criticized the usage of images without dates, source or context to clarify whether they were Eastern or Western: "without explanation, they are at best mildly humorous windows into two societies, and at worst, they are unkind cheap shots of the most egregious kind". Leonardo Reviews's Michael R. Mosher criticized how it ends "irresolutely, too quickly" without a final summary that clarifies its intentions.

== See also ==
- Helga – Vom Werden des menschlichen Lebens: a West German sex educational film
- Ostalgie: nostalgia for aspects of life in Communist East Germany
