= Frederick Herzog =

American Protestant minister and theologian (1925–1995)

The Reverend Frederick Herzog
- Born: Frederick Ludwig Herzog; November 29, 1925; Ashley, North Dakota, US
- Died: October 9, 1995 (aged 69); Durham, North Carolina, US
- Spouse: Kristin Herzog

Ecclesiastical career
- Religion: Christianity
- Church: United Church of Christ

Academic background
- Education: Princeton University
- Thesis: The Possibility of Theological Understanding (1953)
- Doctoral advisor: Paul Lehmann
- Influences: Karl Barth

Academic work
- Discipline: Theology
- Sub-discipline: Systematic theology
- School or tradition: Liberation theology
- Institutions: Duke University
- Influenced: Daniel M. Bell Jr.; Joerg Rieger

Frederick Ludwig Herzog (1925–1995) was an American systematic theologian at Duke University and minister of the United Church of Christ. An impassioned champion of civil rights, his academic focus was liberation theology.

== Life ==
Herzog was born on November 29, 1925, in Ashley, North Dakota. He earned his doctorate from Princeton University in 1953 under the supervision of Paul Lehmann after having studied in Germany and Switzerland, where he was an assistant to the theologian Karl Barth. He was ordained to the ministry of the United Church of Christ, the successor to the German Reformed denomination of his childhood. In 1960, he joined the faculty at Duke Divinity School. Herzog taught Christian theology at Duke until his sudden death during a faculty meeting on October 9, 1995. In the spring of 1970, he wrote the first North American article by a white theologian on liberation theology, following James Cone's Black Theology and Black Power published in 1969, and in 1972 his Liberation Theology was published. In Justice Church Herzog extended his methodology for liberation theology in North America. During the final ten years of his life, his writings were strongly affected by his work in Latin America, especially Peru where he assisted with the support of a Methodist-related seminary, the cause of which he was championing at the moment of his death.

His daughter, Dagmar Herzog, is professor of history at the CUNY Graduate Center in New York City.

== Published works ==
- Herzog, F. Liberation Theology
- Herzog, F. European Pietism Reviewed
- Herzog, F. Justice Church
- Herzog, F. God-Walk - Liberation Shaping Dogmatics

Two books have been published referring to his work:

- Theology & Corporate Conscience: Essays in Honor of Frederick Herzog (ed by MD Meeks, J Moltmann, FR Trost)
- Theology from the Belly of the Whale: A Frederick Herzog Reader (ed by Joerg Rieger)

The Duke University Libraries has a collection of his papers:

- Guide to the Frederick Herzog Papers, 1947-2011 and undated (bulk 1947-1995)
