= SIG Sauer P250 =

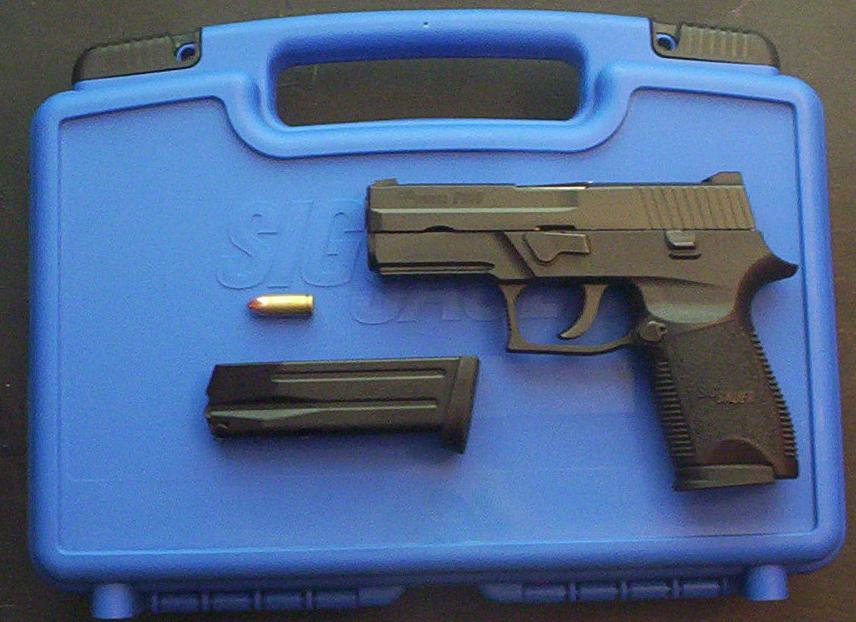
- SIG Sauer P250 9×19mm Parabellum
- Type: Semi-automatic pistol
- Place of origin: United States

Service history
- In service: 2007–present
- Used by: See Users

Production history
- Designer: Adrian Thomele, Thomas Metzger, Michael Mayerl, Ethan Lessard
- Manufacturer: SIG Sauer, Inc., Exeter, NH, United States
- Produced: 2007–2017
- Variants: Full-size, Carry, Compact, Subcompact

Specifications
- Mass: 820 g (28.9 oz) P250 Full Size (incl magazine); 720 g (25.4 oz) P250 Compact (incl magazine); 686 g (24.2 oz) P250 Subcompact (incl magazine)
- Length: 205 mm (8.1 in) P250 Full Size; 183 mm (7.2 in) P250 Carry; 183 mm (7.2 in) P250 Compact; 169 mm (6.7 in) P250 Subcompact
- Barrel length: 120 mm (4.7 in) P250 Full Size; 98 mm (3.9 in) P250 Compact; 91 mm (3.6 in) P250 Subcompact
- Width: 34 mm (1.3 in) P250 Full Size; 34 mm (1.3 in) P250 Compact; 28 mm (1.1 in) P250 Subcompact
- Height: 140 mm (5.5 in) P250 Full Size; 131 mm (5.2 in) P250 Compact; 120 mm (4.7 in) P250 Subcompact
- Caliber: .22 LR.380 ACP; 9×19mm Parabellum; 9×21mm IMI.357 SIG.40 S&W.45 ACP
- Action: Short recoil operated, locked breech.22LR: Blowback
- Rate of fire: Semi-automatic
- Feed system: Full Size: 17 rounds (9×19mm); 14 rounds (.357 SIG, .40 S&W); 10 rounds (.45 ACP); Compact: 15 rounds (9×19mm, 9×21mm); 13 rounds (.357 SIG, .40 S&W); 9 rounds (.45 ACP); 10 rounds (.22LR); Subcompact: 12 rounds (9×19mm, .380 ACP); 10 rounds (.40 S&W); 6 rounds (.45 ACP) "subcompact"
- Sights: Fixed iron sights, front—blade, rear—notch

The SIG Sauer P250 is a semi-automatic pistol made by Sigarms (now known as Sig Sauer Inc. of Exeter, New Hampshire).

== History ==
The P250 chambered in 9mm was introduced to the North American market on November 7, 2007, followed by the .45 ACP compact model in February 2008 at the SHOT Show.

The last of the models was introduced in late 2009.

In early 2014, the SIG P320 was introduced as the P250'S striker-fired descendant of the P250, which continued the modular format and shares several of the same components including magazines and grip frames.

In the 2017 Sig Sauer catalog, the P250 was found under the rimfire category showing the .22 LR caliber as being available but mentioning that caliber exchange kits could be applied to convert the handgun to 9 x 19mm, .40 S&W, or .45 ACP calibers.

As of January 2018, the P250 was no longer found on the Sig Sauer website.

== Design details ==
The hammer-fired P250 can be chambered in .22 Long Rifle, .380 ACP, 9×19mm Parabellum (9mm), .357 SIG, .40 S&W, and .45 ACP.

The P250 has no manual external safeties. Instead, a firing pin block helps to prevent the weapon from accidental discharge.

The trigger is a self-decocking DAO trigger system with spurless and recessed hammer. The trigger system has a pull weight of about 45 N (4.6 kgf, 10.1 lbf)

The handguns are available with a dark colored Nitron slide surface finish, two tone finish, where the stainless steel slide has an untreated surface, and a diamond-plated finish.

The grip module on the P250 Compact was changed in 2009. This change makes that the original and new style grip modules use different magazines.

These old magazines are not compatible with new grip modules; the accessory rail was changed as well from a curved rail to a Picatinny rail.

The factory holsters of the original grip modules do not fit newer grip modules featuring Picatinny rails though the modular nature of the firearm allows the original grip modules to be easily swapped out with the new version inexpensively.

== Variants ==
=== Commercial models ===
- Full Size
- Carry
- Compact
- Subcompact

In 2012, SIG Sauer introduced a medium width version of the subcompact grip module with the Picatinny rail.

The small width versions of the subcompact does not have this. Also introduced were exchange kits for a .380ACP and a .45ACP caliber subcompact version.

=== PPNL version ===
The SIG Sauer PPNL (Dutch: Politie Pistool Nederland, lit. 'Police Pistol Netherlands') was a custom P250 variant intended for Dutch law enforcement.

==== Cancellation ====
In March 2011 the Dutch government informed the Dutch parliament that Heckler & Koch and Walther had sought a preliminary injunction against the intended order for PPNL pistols.

The Volkskrant newspaper wrote:

the choice of the SIG-Sauer earlier this year evoked surprise with representatives of both the arms industry and police unions. During police tests there was a strong preference for a pistol made by Heckler & Koch.

According to the court verdict on 28 March 2011 there were no manipulations involved during the public tender process and the order was finalized.

On 8 November 2011, the Dutch Minister of Security and Justice formally declared SIG Sauer in default and immediately dissolved the order following the fourth negative production sample test of PPNL pistols firing Dutch police issue RUAG Action 4 NP ammunition by an independent German testing institute (Beschussamt Ulm).

Minister Ivo Opstelten found that SIG Sauer could not deliver the requisite quality in a mass production setting and had some harsh comments on SIG Sauer:

On the basis of the results of these tests I no longer find it responsible to continue with this pistol. There is no longer enough confidence in the quality of the pistol, nor in the capacity of the manufacturer to improve the quality or safeguard it. All this brings a risk to the safety of police officers on the street.

The Minister delegated a (legal) review to examine the possibility of coming to an agreement with one of the other suppliers that has had their pistol operationally tested in the procurement procedure.

== Users ==
- Hong Kong: Hong Kong Police Force Being phased out by CS/LS5 since July 2024.
- United Kingdom: Cleveland Police

=== Cancelled orders ===
- Netherlands: For Dutch police service the Dutch government intended to order about 45,000 PPNL pistols (a P250 DCc variant) in 2011 to replace the Walther P5 used by the police and Glock 17 in use as a stopgap measure by the Arrestatieteam (the SWAT team of the Dutch police). In March 2011 the Dutch government informed the Dutch parliament that Heckler & Koch and Walther had sought a preliminary injunction against the intended order for PPNL pistols. The Volkskrant newspaper wrote: "the choice of the SIG-Sauer earlier this year evoked surprise with representatives of both the arms industry and police unions. During police tests there was a strong preference for a pistol made by Heckler & Koch." According to the court verdict on 28 March 2011 there were no manipulations involved during the public tender process and the order was finalized. On 8 November 2011, the Dutch Minister of Security and Justice formally declared SIG Sauer in default and immediately dissolved the order following the fourth negative production sample test of PPNL pistols firing Dutch police issue RUAG Action 4 NP ammunition by an independent German testing institute (Beschussamt Ulm). Minister Ivo Opstelten found that SIG Sauer could not deliver the requisite quality in a mass production setting and had some harsh comments on SIG Sauer: "On the basis of the results of these tests I no longer find it responsible to continue with this pistol. There is no longer enough confidence in the quality of the pistol, nor in the capacity of the manufacturer to improve the quality or safeguard it. All this brings a risk to the safety of police officers on the street." The Minister delegated a (legal) review to examine the possibility of coming to an agreement with one of the other suppliers that has had their pistol operationally tested in the procurement procedure.
- United States: The Federal Air Marshal Service signed a multimillion-dollar contract for procurement of the SIG Sauer P250 Compact chambered for the .357 SIG cartridge in 2009. The order was cancelled and the FAMS continue to carry the current P229.

== Gallery ==
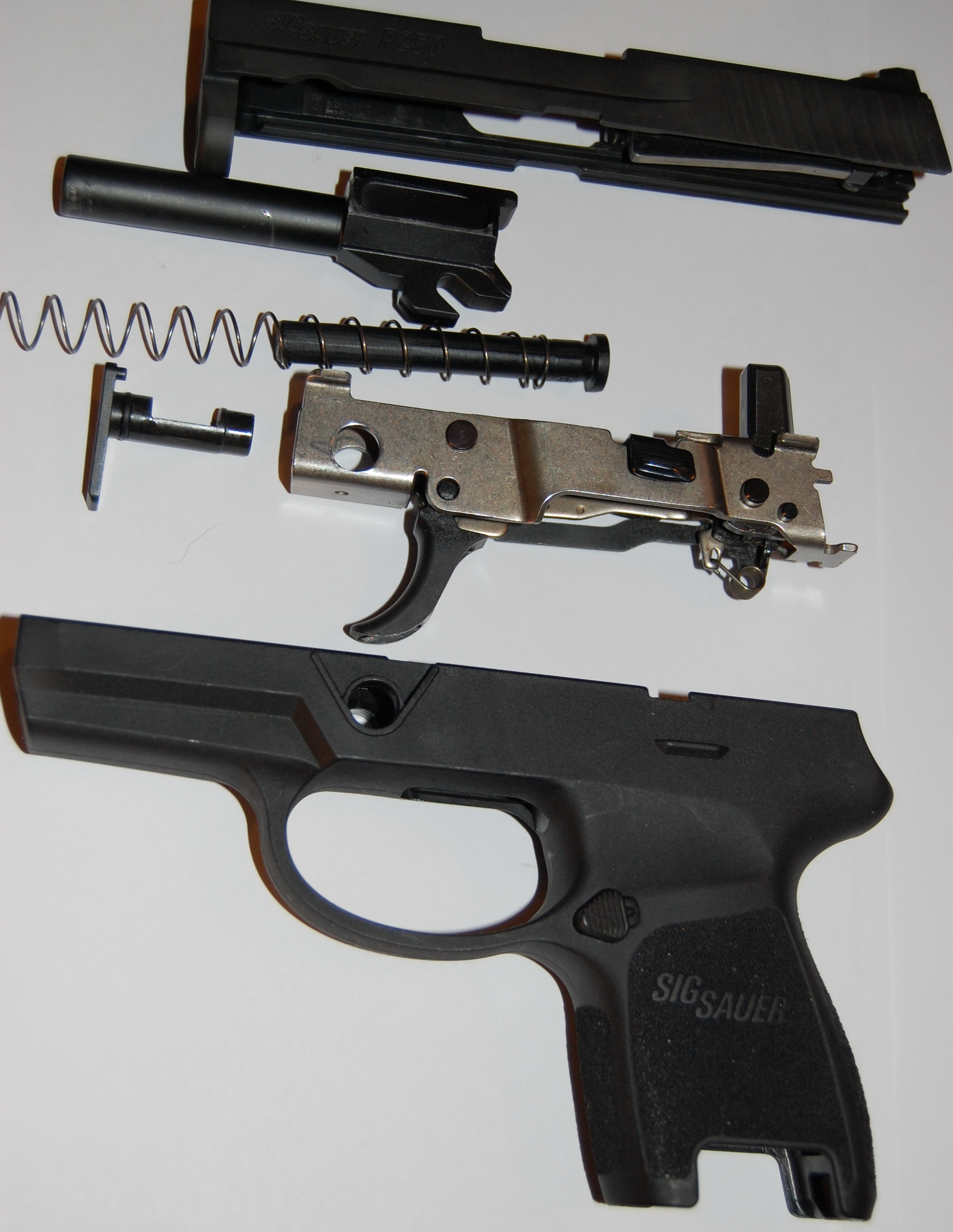
SIG Sauer P250 Sub-Compact disassembled into its major components

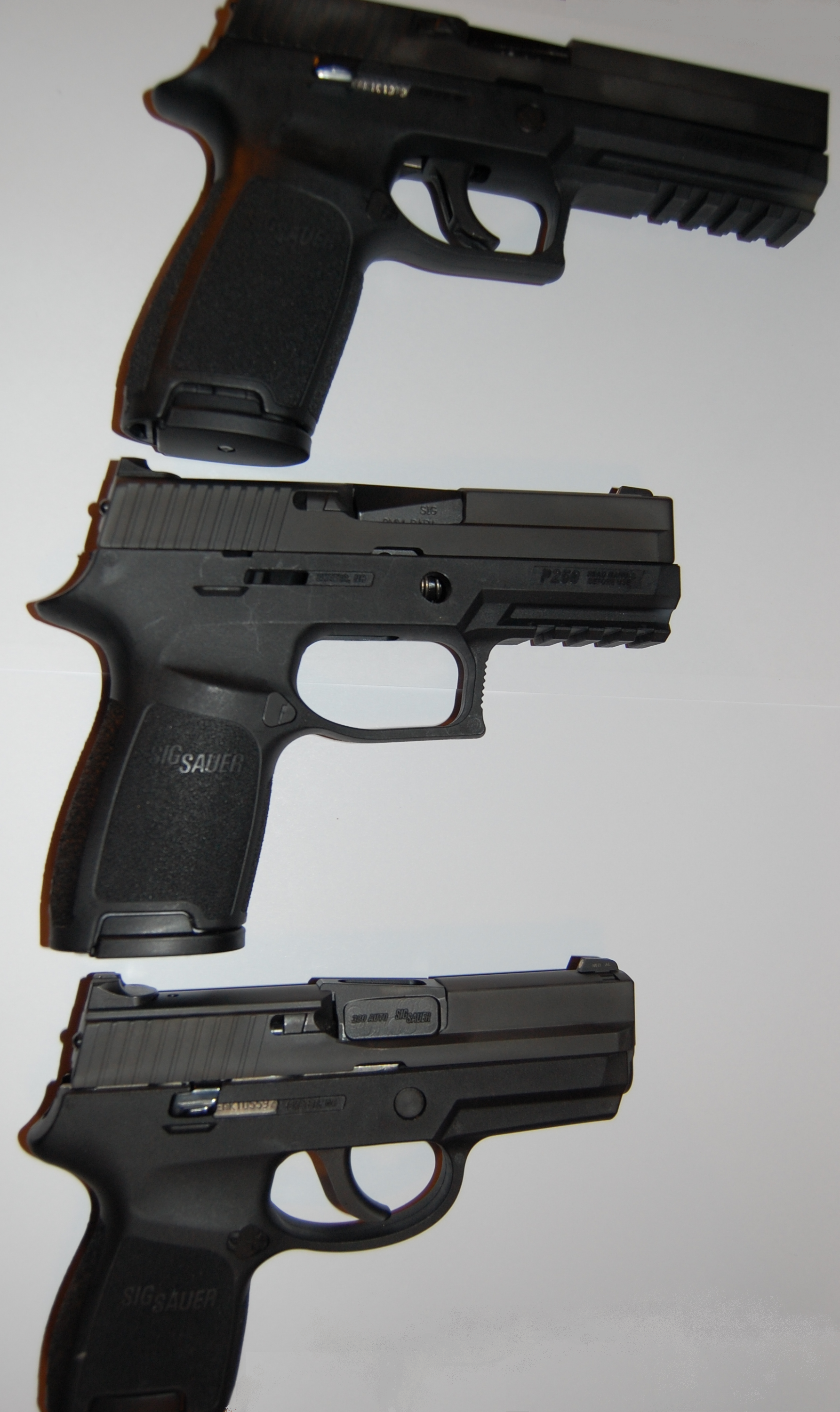
Top: P250 Full Size, middle: P250 Compact (with the trigger group removed), bottom: P250 Sub Compact

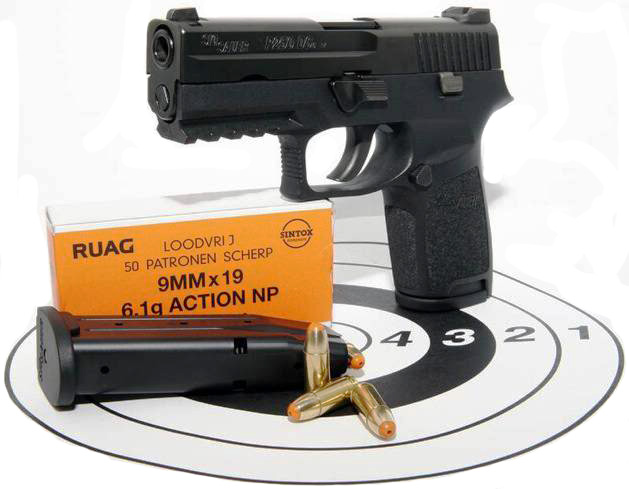
The cancelled SIG Sauer PPNL variant developed for the Dutch Police with RUAG Action 4 NP ammunition
