= SIG Sauer P320 =

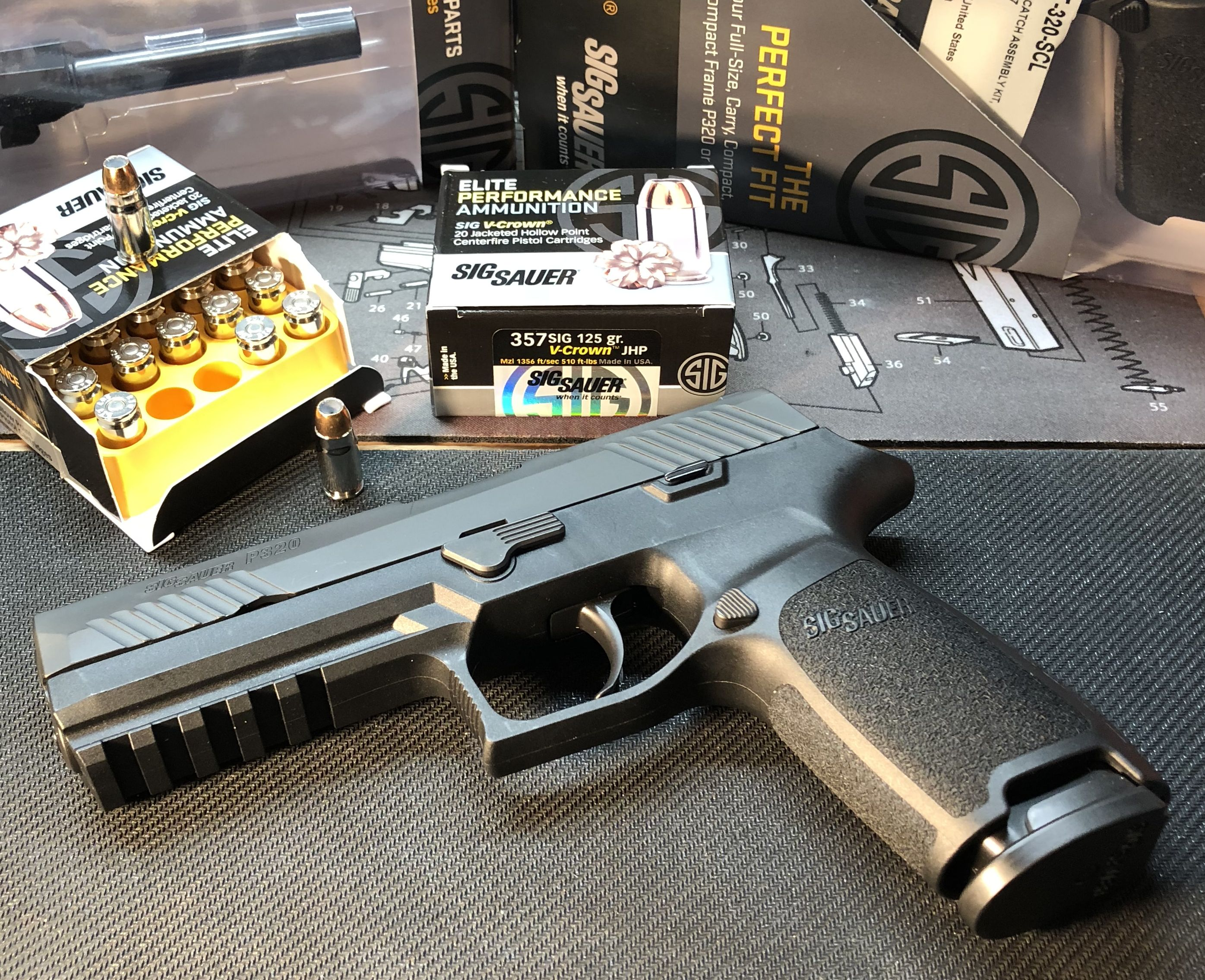
- SIG Sauer P320
- Type: Semi-automatic pistol
- Place of origin: United States; Germany; Switzerland

Service history
- In service: 2014–present
- Used by: See Users

Production history
- Designer: Sean Toner; Michael W. Mayerl
- Designed: 2014
- Manufacturer: SIG Sauer Inc.; SIG Sauer GmbH & Co. KG (Until 2020)
- Produced: 2014–present
- Variants: See Variants

Specifications
- Mass: 833 g (29.4 oz) (incl. magazine)
- Length: 203 mm (8.0 in)
- Barrel length: 120 mm (4.7 in)
- Width: 35.5 mm (1.4 in)
- Height: 140 mm (5.5 in)
- Caliber: 9×19mm Parabellum; .357 SIG; .40 S&W; 10 mm Auto; .45 ACP
- Action: Short recoil-operated, locked-breech SIG Sauer system
- Feed system: 10-round magazine .45 ACP; 14-round magazine .357 SIG, .40 S&W; 12-round, 15-round, 17-round, 21-round, or 30 round 9×19mm Parabellum
- Sights: Fixed iron sights, front—blade, rear—notch, with optional tritium night inserts, optical reflex sight on RX models, high sights on some RX and Tacops models

The SIG Sauer P320 is a modular striker-fired semi-automatic pistol made by SIG Sauer Inc., SIG Sauer's American branch, and the company's first striker-fired pistol to be commercially released.

In 2017, a customized version of the P320 was selected as the winner of the U.S. military's Modular Handgun System competition, becoming the primary service pistol for the U.S. Army. Following its military adoption, the P320 has been the subject of public scrutiny and litigation regarding its safety, with allegations of unintentional discharges. This has prompted some law enforcement agencies and civilian organizations to discontinue its use. SIG Sauer has maintained that the pistol can only be fired when the trigger is moved to the rear and has been rigorously tested.

According to The Washington Post, the P320 is one of the most popular handguns in the United States.

== History ==
The P320 chambered in 9×19mm Parabellum was introduced in the North American market on 15 January 2014, followed by the .45 ACP compact model at the SHOT Show in January 2015.

On January 19, 2017, it was announced that a customized version of the SIG Sauer P320 had won the United States Army's XM17 Modular Handgun System competition. In April 2017, Caracal International was made a licensed producer for the P320.

In December 2025, the SIG Sauer P320 replaced the SIG P220 as the Swiss Army's new service pistol.

== Design ==
The P320 is a further development of the SIG Sauer P250, utilizing a striker-fired mechanism in lieu of a double action only hammer system. SIG lists the trigger pull of the standard P320 at 29 N (6.5 lb_{f}). The P320 trigger pull is accomplished by a combination of a tensioned striker spring, ideal trigger shoe and trigger bar dimensions, sear/striker engagement, and a balanced trigger system.

=== Ammunition ===
The P320 can be chambered in 9×19mm Parabellum, .357 SIG, .40 S&W, .45 ACP, and 10mm Auto and can be easily converted from one caliber to another; a change from .357 SIG to .40 S&W requires only a barrel change; a change from 9mm to .357 SIG or .40 S&W (or vice versa) is accomplished using a caliber exchange kit.

Because of differences in sizes, caliber exchange kits are only available between 9mm, .357 SIG, and .40 S&W. .45 ACP and 10mm require larger components and are not interchangeable with smaller calibers.

=== Operation ===
The P320 was designed to be ambidextrous in handling, sporting a catch lever on both sides of the slide and a user-reversible magazine release, and all other operating controls are designed to be operated from either side.

The firearm can be field-stripped with no tools.

Additionally, the firearm can be field stripped without depressing the trigger, an additional safety feature to prevent negligent discharge of the weapon during disassembly. The fire control unit is removable, allowing the switch to a different grip size.

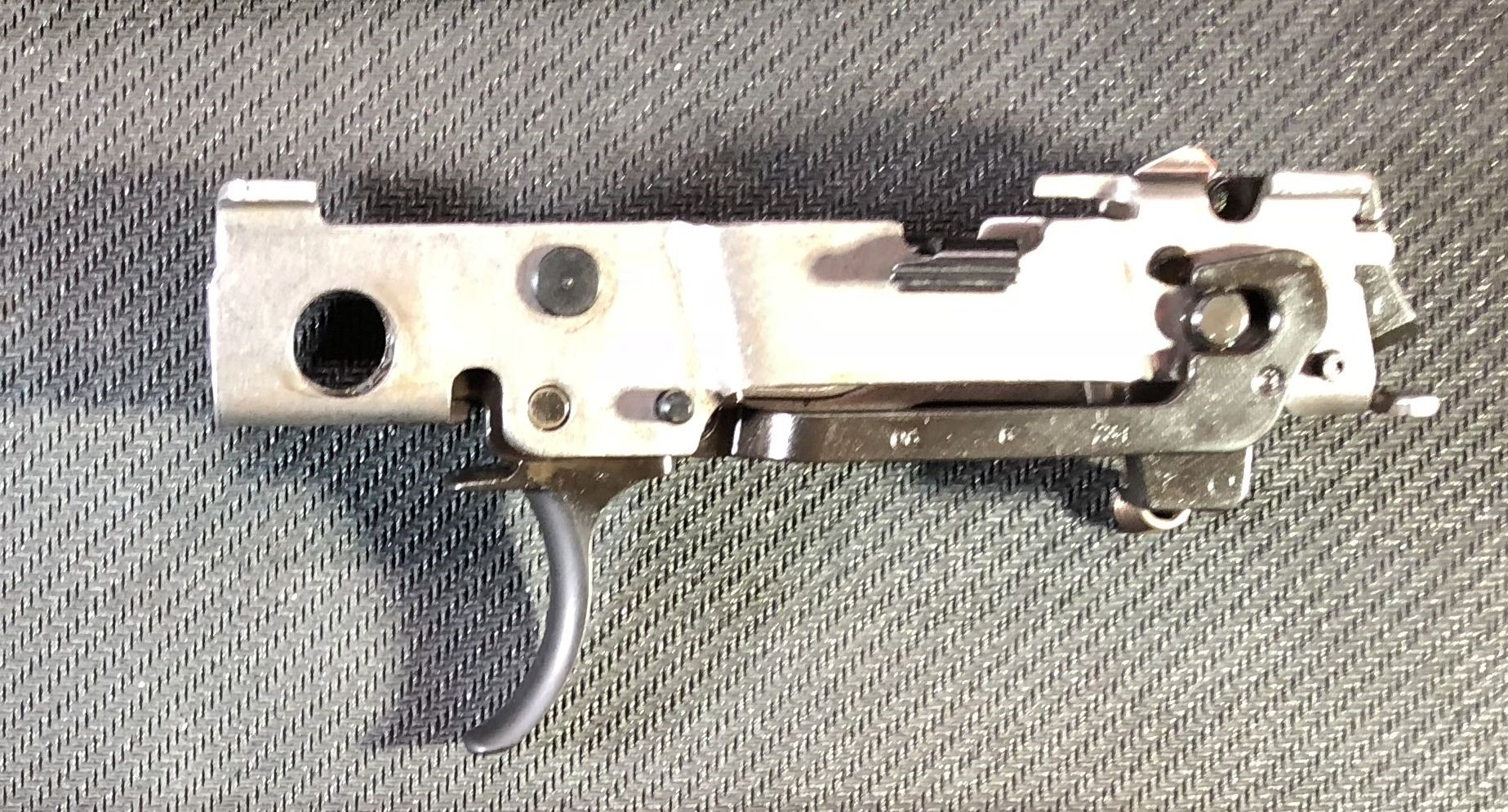
SIG Sauer P320 fire control unit

=== Trigger system ===
The P320 trigger shoe is available with a solid, all-metal trigger.

Both curved and straight trigger shoe variants are available from SIG and from third-party aftermarket suppliers.

== Variants ==
The full-sized model is known as the M17, and the compact carry-sized model is known as the M18.

=== X Series models ===
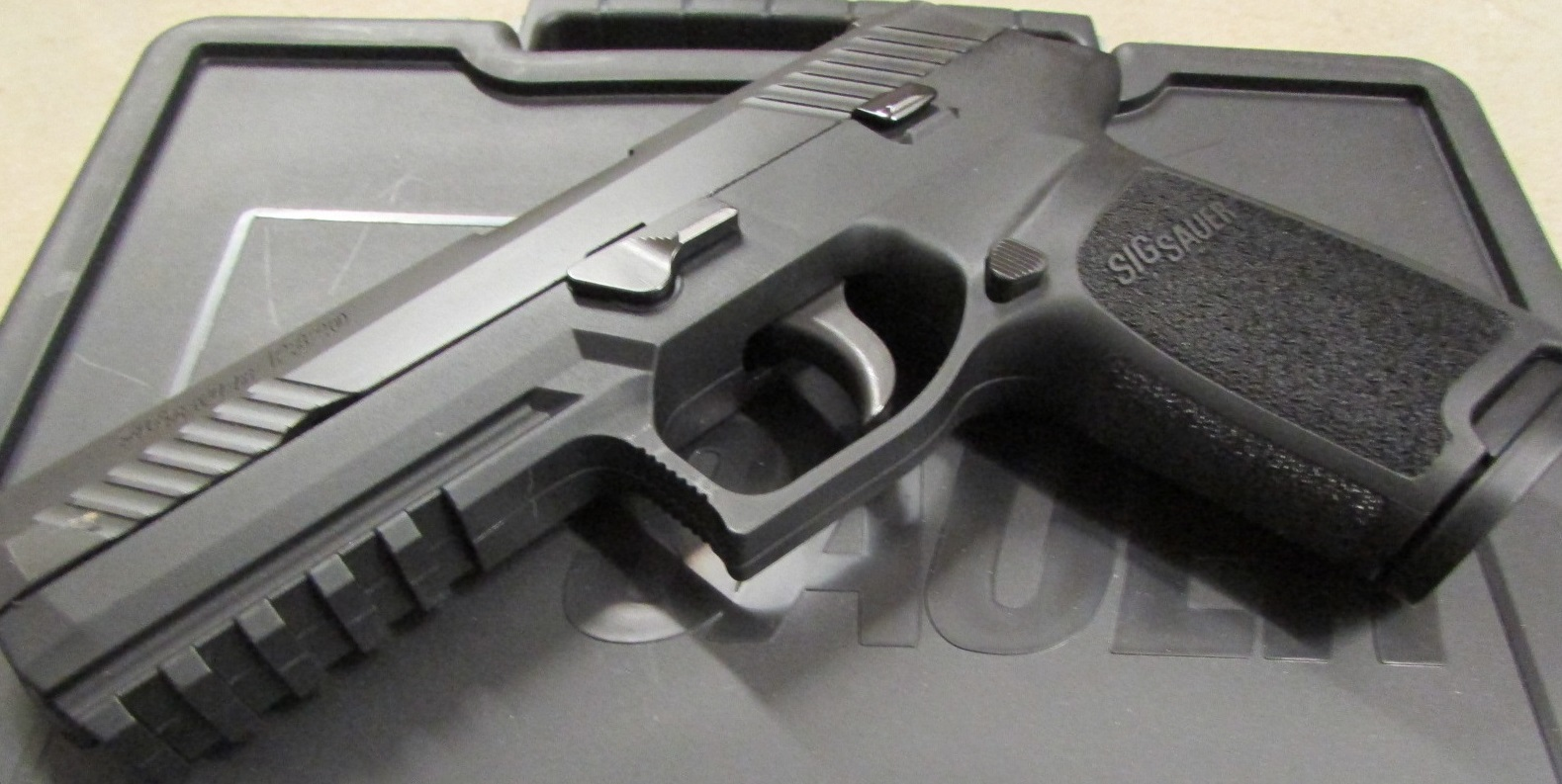
SIG Sauer P320 Full Size (pre-upgrade)

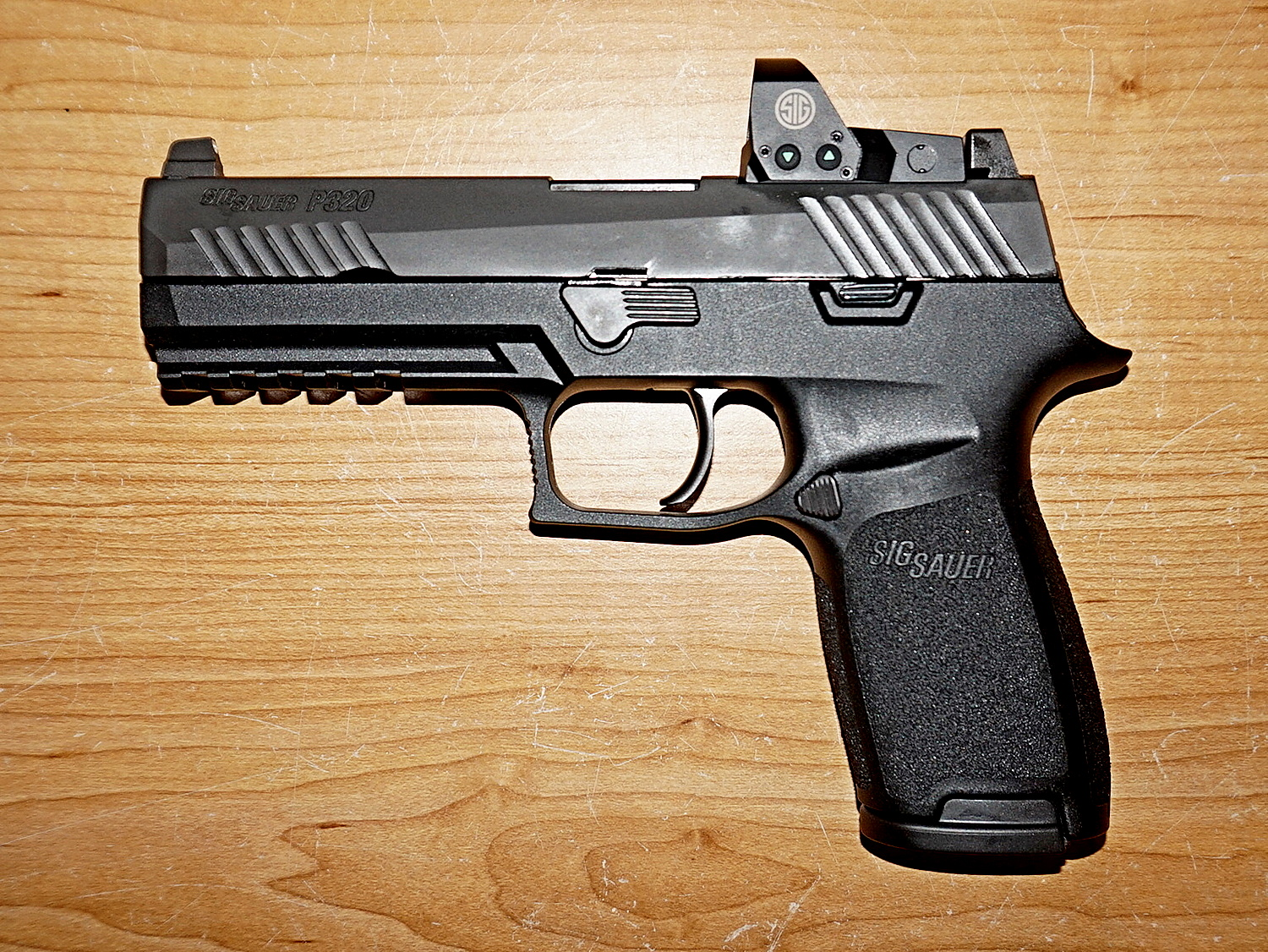
SIG Sauer P320 RX (with Romeo 1 optical reflex sight)

The X Series lineup includes the following grip module sizes:

- Cd .357 SIG. The full-size slide also fits the carry-size grip module without any part of the recoil spring showing.
- Full size – Fits any SIG P320 full-size slide in 9mm, .40 S&W, and .357 SIG

In January 2019, SIG Sauer announced the XCompact handgun as the newest entry in their X Series lineup.

- Compact size – As of March 2020, the P320 XCompact is available in 9mm only.

The XCompact size grip module is the smallest grip module SIG currently carries, as they have not released a subcompact X Series grip module to date.

In May 2022, SIG Sauer announced a 10mm Auto P320 variant, named the P320 XTEN.

=== M17 ===
The new US Army handgun requirements included a preference for an existing handgun model in the Modular Handgun System Request for Proposal, known as the XM17 Procurement. SIG Sauer submitted a P320 with a number of modifications and submitted it for the XM17 Modular Handgun System competition.

Features include:

- 3.9-inch (99 mm) barrel length in carry size pistol
- 4.7-inch (120 mm) barrel length in full size pistol
- Ambidextrous thumb safety
- Chambered in 9×19mm Parabellum (can be adapted to fire larger calibers like .357 SIG, .40 S&W, and .45 ACP)
- Improved slide sub-assembly to capture small components when disassembled
- Improved trigger "mud flap" to prevent foreign debris from entering the pistol action
- Loaded chamber indicator
- Pistols chambered in 9 mm can feature a 17-round magazine as standard, with optional 21-round extended magazines available.
- Slide cut-out to facilitate the addition of a reflex sight. (This is the slide from the RX Series)

On January 19, 2017, it was announced that the SIG Sauer P320 MHS variant had won the United States Military's Modular Handgun System trials. The P320 will be known as the M17 (full size) and M18 (compact) in U.S. Military service. Though the pistol will remain chambered in 9 × 19 mm Parabellum rather than a larger caliber, the contract allows the services to procure SIG Sauer's proposed XM1152 Full Metal Jacket and XM1153 Special Purpose ammunition.

In May 2017, the Army announced that the first unit that will receive the M17 would be the 101st Airborne Division by the end of the year. At the same time, the rest of the U.S. Armed Forces revealed they also intend to acquire the handgun, making it the standard sidearm for the entire U.S. military. The services plan to procure up to 421,000 weapons in total: 195,000 for the Army, 130,000 for the Air Force, 61,000 for the Navy (XM18 compact version only), and 35,000 for the Marines.

On 17 November 2017, soldiers of the 101st Airborne received the first XM17 and XM18 pistols, with over 2,000 handguns delivered. The XM17 has better accuracy and ergonomics, and tighter dispersion than the M9. It will also be fielded more widely, being issued down to squad and fireteam leaders; while special forces would dual-arm all of its members with a pistol and rifle; previously, junior leaders in regular infantry units were excluded from carrying sidearms but policy was changed to give them more choices and options in close quarters battle situations. All Army units are planned to replace the M9 with the M17 within a decade.

=== X-Carry ===
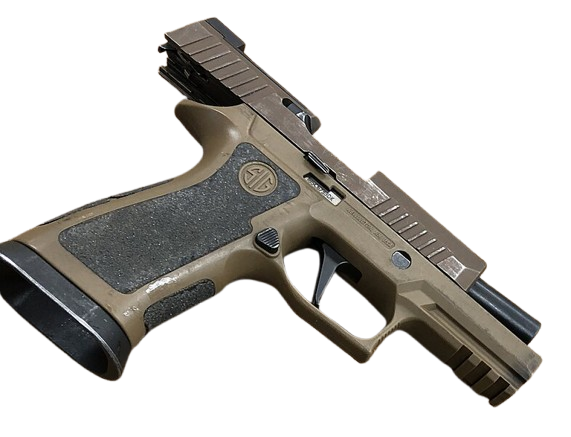
SIG Sauer P320 X-Carry with a flared magwell

The X-Carry is a larger model of the XCompact featuring 17 rounds per magazine, compared to the Compact's 15 rounds, an enlarged grip, a longer slide, and a smaller slide lock. The X-Carry is the frame used for the M18.

=== XFive Legion ===
Released in late July/early August 2019, the XFIVE Legion is considered the flagship of the P320 platform that brings added weight and features. The TXG grip module has tungsten-infused directly into the polymer along with an attachable magazine well. It comes standard with Henning group aluminum base pads and a skeletonized flat trigger. The complete 9mm slide has lightening cuts in the top to reduce weight and assist in recoil. It is also optics ready through the removal of the rear sight plate assembly. The optics cut is the Delta Point/Romeo 1 Pro profile, but will accommodate multiple optics via adapter plates.

=== P320-XTEN ===
The SIG P320-XTENMAX is a 10mm Auto chambered X Series variant of the P320, released in 2022. It features an X Series grip module, bull barrel, flat X Series trigger and a Nitron-finished stainless steel slide with a cut for mounting aiming optics. Magazine capacity is 15 rounds. It weighs 33 oz (936 grams), has a 5-inch (127 mm) bull barrel, overall length of 8.5 inches (216 mm), overall height of 5.6 inches (142 mm), overall width of 1.3 inches (33 mm) and a sight radius of 6.8 inches (173 mm).

=== P320MAX ===
The SIG P320MAX is a sporterised variant of the P320, designed in 2021 for use by competition shooters. The pistol comes with ROMEO3 MAX sights and tungsten infused TXG heavy grip module, weighs 43.5 oz (1.23 kilograms), has a 5-inch (130 mm) match grade barrel, and an overall length of 8.5 inches (220 mm).

=== P320AXG ===
The SIG P320AXG was the first P320 offered with a metal grip module. The first model was the 320AXG Scorpion and was launched in 2021. It was followed by the Equinox, Combat, and several other models later in the year. Its metal alloy grip module offered a new level of solidity and stiffness to the P320 platform and allowed for numerous colors, finishes, and aftermarket grip panels. The P320AXG Legion, released in April 2023, was offered with a Legion gray Cerakote finish, Hogue Legion grips and an integrated slide compensator. All P320AXG models come standard with XRay3 day-night sights and are offered with and without Romeo red dot optics.

=== P320SXG ===
The SIG P320SXG XFIVE was launched in November 2024, and was the first P320 offered with a heavy steel grip module. This was the heaviest P320 ever made at 50 oz (1.4 kilograms) in weight. Designed for the serious competitive shooter, the P320SXG XFIVE offered a 5" bull barrel, adjustable sights, an SXG full-length grip module and LOK G10 grip panels. The P320SXG grip was also offered in the P320 Reserve featuring a carry-length SXG grip module, integrated slide compensator and a high-polish finish.

== Military adoption ==
In January 2017, the SIG Sauer P320 was selected as the winner of the U.S. Army's Modular Handgun System (MHS) competition, a program intended to replace the Beretta M9 as the standard U.S. military sidearm. Designated the XM17 and XM18, the pistols were adopted under a joint-service procurement program that allowed the other military branches to purchase additional units.

== Problems ==
=== Drop firing ===
Initial production models of the P320 were found to have a "drop safety" vulnerability if the firearm was dropped at a specific angle and height outside of SAAMI and NATO standards, potentially causing it to discharge. SIG Sauer has since refitted the P320 to further improve its drop safety and offers a voluntary upgrade program for early P320s.

In late July 2017, the Dallas Police Department in Texas instructed all personnel to stop carrying the P320 pending an investigation. There were concerns that the firearm may discharge when it is dropped and the back of the slide hits the ground at a 33-degree angle. The problem was thought to be related to the trigger weight; some triggers were heavy enough that they essentially continued to move due to inertia after the gun hit the ground.

On 8 August 2017, SIG Sauer issued a notice that they would upgrade all P320s to address the issue. The upgrade is described on the company's website as: "an alternate design that reduces the physical weight of the trigger, sear, and striker while additionally adding a mechanical disconnector."

Issues of drop firing or shooting its user in the leg while holstered have continued sporadically with at least six departments removing the P320 from service.

=== Reports of misfiring ===
Around 400 P320s were procured for the Canadian Joint Task Force 2 special forces unit (JTF-2) in 2019, but these were withdrawn and the earlier P226 pistols (also manufactured by SIG Sauer) reinstated following a misfire that injured a soldier during a training exercise in November 2020; JTF-2 was the only Canadian military unit using the P320 at the time.

In June 2021, a technical investigation found that the misfire was due to "a partial depression of the trigger by a foreign object combined with simultaneous movement of the slide [...] that then allowed a round to be fired whilst the pistol was still holstered" and that the usage of a holster designed for a different pistol was a contributory factor. The investigation did not identify issues with how the pistol had been procured by Canadian defence officials, though questions had been raised as to whether these officials were aware of the drop safety issues.

However, the pistols would remain in storage pending a third-party safety assessment.

The safety assessment and other proceedings related to the misfire were concluded by June 2022, with a decision to reinstate the P320 being taken towards the end of that month.

=== Uncommanded discharge ===
An investigation by The Washington Post and The Trace, published in April 2023, found more than 100 people who say their P320 discharged with no trigger pressure; at least 80 of them were wounded as a result, including 33 officers at 18 law enforcement agencies. At least 35 of the shootings are purported to have occurred with either post-2017 P320s with the updated design intended to address the drop firing problem, or older ones which had been updated by SIG Sauer. Reports of discharges have been recorded as early as 2016.

Like some striker-fired pistols, the P320 is "effectively fully cocked at rest", since its striker is under constant spring pressure, which is released when the trigger is pulled. According to gunsmith James Tertin, this is a rare and "uniquely dangerous" configuration. During court testimony regarding firearms testing, P320 designer Sean Toner commented on the nature of voluntary U.S. industry safety standards, stating they are "not very stringent."

By April 2023, six American law enforcement agencies discontinued use of the firearm due to concerns over unintentional discharges. These agencies include the Milwaukee Police, the Dallas Police, the SEPTA Transit Police in Philadelphia, as well as other agencies in Alabama, Connecticut, Florida, Texas, Washington State, and Wisconsin. The Fraternal Order of Police's Wisconsin state lodge recommended in mid-September 2022 that the state's police departments stop using the weapon, citing three Milwaukee Police officer injuries involving their service weapons or their partner's service weapons firing without any trigger pressure since 2020.

SIG Sauer has maintained that the P320 meets applicable safety standards and that its design was validated through extensive testing, including the U.S. military’s Modular Handgun System evaluation. The company has said reported incidents are often the result of improper handling, while critics and plaintiffs have alleged unintentional discharges.

In August 2024, the FBI Ballistic Research Facility (BRF) evaluated an M18 issued to a Michigan State Police trooper that had reportedly discharged in its holster the previous month. The 32-page report, dated 30 August 2024, was released publicly in July 2025 in response to a public-records request. SIG Sauer declined to participate in the initial evaluation, though the holster manufacturer, Alien Gear, did participate.

Using X-ray imaging, coordinate scans and isolated tests of the fire control mechanism, BRF examiners identified several conditions on the evaluated pistol, including a striker safety lock spring that was not fully seated, uneven wear on the sear, wear on the primary and secondary sear notch edges, and a ledge on the underside of the striker pin hook where a flat surface would be expected. The report concluded that with movements representative of those common to a law enforcement officer, it was possible to render the striker safety lock inoperable if complete sear engagement was lost, allowing the striker to impact a chambered round without a trigger pull. BRF examiners also reported reproducing similar conditions on a factory-new M18.

SIG Sauer subsequently engaged with the FBI and Michigan State Police, and a follow-up round of testing was conducted using a mutually agreed protocol. According to SIG Sauer, the subsequent testing produced no failures across approximately 560 attempts on about 20 striker assemblies, and Michigan State Police continued to issue P320-platform pistols to its officers. The follow-up report has not been made public, and the FBI BRF has not issued a public statement on the safety of the P320.

In July 2025, Air Force Global Strike Command (AFGSC) temporarily paused the use of its M18 pistols as a precaution following the shooting death of a Security Forces Airman. An investigation by the Air Force Office of Special Investigations later revealed the incident was not a weapon malfunction; an airman was arrested and charged with involuntary manslaughter for allegedly pointing his weapon at the victim and making false statements about the shooting. After a command-wide inspection of all 7,970 M18s, AFGSC reinstated the pistol for duty use in August 2025, stating that a review of past discharges found none were attributable to weapon malfunction.

On July 9, 2025, a U.S. Department of Homeland Security memorandum directed U.S. Immigration and Customs Enforcement to discontinue operational use of the P320 and transition to a different model. On July 28, 2025, ICE renewed its contract for SIG P320 service weapons through 2027.

On July 31, 2025, the IDPA announced it was prohibiting the P320 from its competitions, explaining that "numerous reports and videos" alleging uncommanded discharges had made the matter "too visible to deny", while noting it possessed "no direct knowledge of any technical defect" with the firearm. Firearms media described the decision as the first blanket prohibition of the P320 by a national practical-shooting body and noted that other SIG Sauer handguns remain eligible within their respective IDPA divisions. IDPA stated that it would revisit the restriction in the future should new, credible information about the pistol's safety become available.

Multiple organizations and firing ranges, such as the National Law Enforcement Firearms Instructors Association, and the Washington State Criminal Justice Training Commission have also banned the use of the P320 over unresolved safety concerns.

=== 2025 response to claims ===
On March 7, 2025, SIG Sauer responded to claims that the SIG Sauer P320 would discharge on its own, or when dropped at a specific angle. The article released by SIG Sauer stated that "The P320 CANNOT, under any circumstances, discharge without a trigger pull – that is a fact. The allegations against the P320 are nothing more than individuals seeking to profit or avoid personal responsibility." and labeled those who made claims against the P320 as "uninformed and agenda-driven parties", a characterization that has been disputed by plaintiffs, some law enforcement agencies, and investigative reporting.

== Lawsuits ==
Lawsuits involving the P320 include the following (listed chronologically). This list is not exhaustive.

=== Steyr Arms, Inc. v. Sig Sauer, Inc. ===
In May 2017, Steyr Arms, Inc. filed a patent infringement lawsuit against SIG Sauer via the United States District Court for the Northern District of Alabama. Steyr refers to their patent US6260301 (filed in 1999 and approved in 2001), which is for a handgun with a removable chassis. Steyr Arms requested a preliminary and permanent injunction to stop SIG Sauer from manufacturing and selling its P250 and P320 pistols. On 25 February 2020, the United States District Court for the District of New Hampshire granted SIG Sauer summary judgment, finding that SIG Sauer did not infringe Steyr's patents and dismissed all motions.

=== Sheperis v. Sig Sauer, Inc. ===
On August 4, 2017, four days before the Voluntary Upgrade Program was announced, Stamford Police Department SRT officer Vincent Sheperis filed a negligence action in the United States District Court for the District of Connecticut against SIG Sauer after his holstered P320 allegedly fell from the back of his vehicle and discharged a round into his knee on January 4, 2017. Although SIG reassured the public that the P320 design met industry standards regarding its drop safety, Sheperis's attorney, Jeff Bagnell, stated that the upgrade was telling. "The suit has been validated already", he said, adding that having SIG recall and fix the alleged defect is one of the demands listed in the complaint. SIG settled the case in June 2018.

=== Vadnais v. Sig Sauer, Inc. ===
On May 4, 2018, Loudoun County deputy sheriff Marcie D. Vadnais, through her attorney, Jeffrey S. Bagnell, filed a negligence action against SIG Sauer in the United States District Court for the Eastern District of Virginia after her holstered P320 allegedly discharged and broke her femur in half in February 2018 as she was removing it from her belt. The case settled on May 29, 2019, the second day of a jury trial.

=== Leo Nielsen Trading ApS and Glock Ges.m.b.H v. Danish Defence Acquisition and Logistics Organization ===
On March 15, 2019, Glock disputed the adoption of the P320 X-Carry into Danish military service, claiming the P320 did not meet DALO specification No. 79, which stated "No parts of the pistol shall be possible to mount incorrectly or in the wrong places." The case was won by Leo Nielsen Trading ApS and Glock Ges.m.b.H as they proved the ejector could be assembled incorrectly, were paid 30,000 Danish krones, and the purchase was cancelled. Later the contract was put out with different requirements, which the P320 fulfilled.

=== Ortiz v. Sig Sauer, Inc. ===
In September 2019, an Arizona gun owner who purchased a P320 in September 2016 initiated a class action lawsuit. It claims that SIG Sauer "continued to sell the flawed gun to the public", and that the upgrade offered "would still not fully compensate him for the significantly diminished resale value of his pistol". In March 2020, Judge Joseph N. Laplante denied SIG Sauer's motion to dismiss the case. In May 2020, a trial notice was issued, with pretrial statements due on 5 October 2021; in January 2021, the due date for pretrial statements was revised to 1 February 2022. The motion for class certification was denied in 2022.

=== Green-Berrios v. Sig Sauer Inc. ===
On January 4, 2022, a police officer, Elvis Ramon Green-Berrios, filed a lawsuit with the United States District Court for the District of Puerto Rico claiming that his service pistol, a P320, discharged without the trigger being pulled. Specifically, "As soon as he took hold of the holster at his waistband inside his pants, the P320 fired and hit him in his right thigh...". The lawsuit was dismissed in March 2025 after the plaintiff "admitting in court filed documents that his P320 pistol has no defects and does not discharge without a trigger pull." SIG Sauer stated that this was the eighteenth P320 unintentional discharge lawsuit to be dismissed.

=== Armendariz, et al. v. Sig Sauer, Inc. ===
On November 30, 2022, a lawsuit was filed in U.S. federal court alleging several P320 pistols unintentionally fired "without the trigger being pulled or deliberately actuated by the user". The lawsuit claims there have been "over 100 incidents" of such discharges, "many of which have caused severe injury". An attorney representing the lawsuit's plaintiffs, Robert Zimmerman, said it was the largest lawsuit against SIG Sauer involving the P320 on behalf of people who were injured. The 20 plaintiffs in the case (20 individuals and about a dozen spouses) are from 13 different states.

=== Anderson, et al. v. Sig Sauer, Inc. ===
On March 26, 2025, a group of 22 plaintiffs from 16 states filed a negligence and product liability lawsuit against SIG Sauer, asserting "uncommanded firing" of P320 pistols. The lead attorney for the plaintiffs claimed, "Sig knowingly designed and manufactured America's most dangerously-defective firearm". The lawsuit was filed with the United States District Court for the District of New Hampshire.

=== Sig Sauer, Inc. v. Washington State Criminal Justice Training Commission ===
On June 11, 2025, Sig Sauer filed a lawsuit against the Washington State Criminal Justice Training Commission (WSCJTC), Washington State's police academy, and their executive director, Monica Alexander, following its ban of the P320 from use on their firing ranges. The WSCJTC had banned the P320 following a report from an instructor in 2024 that a trainee's P320 had fired on a range without a trigger pull and established a task force investigating the weapon's safety prior to the ban. SIG Sauer claims that the ban "is unnecessary, unprecedented, not well grounded in fact or law and harmful to Sig Sauer", claiming that the ban violates state law, and also sued to prevent the WSCJTC's executive director from making public statements about the P320.

=== Cole v. Sig Sauer Inc. ===
On August 7, 2026, a federal jury ruled in favor of Sig Sauer against David Cole that the P320 had a defective design. On May 4, 2022, while executing a search warrant for the Somerset County Sheriffs Department, Cole was struck after his P320 fired in the holster striking his leg. David Cole and his wife Kimberly Cole both sued Sig Sauer for product defect, negligence, and breach of implied warranty for the P320. The federal jury found Cole could not prove a defect in the P320, and also found no negligence for Sig Sauer.

== Users ==
Country	Organization/Notes	Model	Reference
Australia	Australian Defence Force	P320 X-Carry Pro (designated F9)	
Bolivia	Cuerpo de Policía Nacional	P320	
Brazil	Civil Police of Ceará State	P320	
Brazil	Military Police of Ceará State	P320	
Brazil	Military Police of Goiás State	P320	
Canada	Canadian Armed Forces	P320 (designated C22 Full Frame)	
Canada	Canadian Forces Military Police	P320 (designated C24 Medium Frame)	
Costa Rica	Public Force of Costa Rica	P320	
Denmark	Danish Defence	P320 X-Carry	
Denmark	Rigspolitiet	P320 X-Carry	
France	French National Railway Company Security	P320	
France	Wasquehal Municipal Police	P320	
Indonesia	Indonesian National Police	P320	
Indonesia	Korpasgat (Quick Reaction Forces Corps) of the Indonesian Air Force.	P320	
Mexico	National Guard of Mexico	P320	
Norway	Norwegian Police Service	P320 XCarry	
Spain	Grupo Especial de Operaciones	P320	
Switzerland	St. Gallen Police	P320	
Switzerland	Swiss armed forces (adoption announced December 2025)	P320	
Thailand	Royal Thai Police	P320	
United States	United States Armed Forces	M17; M18	
United States	United States Immigration and Customs Enforcement	P320	
United States	National Park Service: U.S. Park Police and Law Enforcement Rangers	P320 XCarry	
United States	Delaware State Police	P320	
United States	Hawaii Department of Public Safety	P320	
United States	Nevada Highway Patrol	P320	
United States	Michigan State Police	P320	
United States	North Dakota Highway Patrol	P320	
United States	Oklahoma Highway Patrol	P320	
United States	Rhode Island State Police	P320	
United States	Texas Department of Public Safety	P320	
United States	Indiana State Police	P320	
United States	Virginia State Police	P320	
United States	Puerto Rico Police Bureau	P320	
United States	Chicago Police Department	P320	
United States	Dallas Police Department (formerly)	P320	
United States	Tampa Police Department	P320	
United States	Braintree, Massachusetts	P320 .45ACP	
United States	Cambridge, Massachusetts Police Department	P320	
United States	Somerville, Massachusetts	P320	
United States	Pasco County Sheriff's Office	P320	
United States	Ventura County, California Sheriff's Office	P320	
United States	Manchester, New Hampshire	P320	
United States	Concord, New Hampshire Police Department	P320	
United States	Portsmouth, New Hampshire Police Department	P320	
United States	Newington, New Hampshire Police Department	P320	
United States	Lloyd Harbor, New York Police Department	P320	
United States	Milwaukee Police Department (formerly, 2019 — 2023)	P320	
United States	Sumter, South Carolina Police Department	P320	
United States	Newark, Delaware Police Department	P320	
United States	Miami Beach, Florida Police Department	P320 XCarry 9mm	
United States	Bay Area Rapid Transit Police Department	P320	
United States	Virginia Division of Capitol Police	P320	
United States	Ames, Iowa Police Department	P320	
