= Bryan R. Klipfel =

American politician

Colonel Bryan R. Klipfel is an American police officer. He was the superintendent of the North Dakota Highway Patrol from 2003 to 2007 and is a native of Ashley, North Dakota. He has been a member of the highway patrol since 1980. He is a graduate of the University of North Dakota (1975) and of the FBI National Academy (1987) in Quantico, Virginia.

Preceded by James M. Hughes	North Dakota Highway Patrol Superintendent; 2003–2007	Succeeded by Mark Nelson
