= Dagmar Herzog =

American history professor

Dagmar Herzog is Distinguished Professor of History and the Daniel Rose Faculty Scholar at the Graduate Center, City University of New York.

== Life and career ==
Herzog has published extensively on the histories of sexuality and gender, psychoanalysis and Freud, theology and religion, disability, eugenics, Jewish-Christian relations and Holocaust memory. Her most recent books include Unlearning Eugenics: Sexuality, Reproduction, and Disability in Post-Nazi Europe; Cold War Freud: Psychoanalysis in an Age of Catastrophes; Sex after Fascism: Memory and Morality in Twentieth-Century Germany; and Sex in Crisis: The New Sexual Revolution and the Future of American Politics.

Herzog graduated summa cum laude from Duke University. She received her Ph.D. from Brown University. Before going to the Graduate Center in 2005, Herzog taught at Michigan State, was a Mellon Fellow at Harvard and a member of the Institute for Advanced Study in Princeton, New Jersey. In 2012, she won a John Simon Guggenheim Memorial Foundation Fellowship for her work in Intellectual and Cultural History.

She is the daughter of scholar Frederick Herzog, who was a theology professor at Duke.

== Bibliography ==
Books

- Herzog, D: The Question of Unworthy Life. Eugenics and Germany's Twentieth Century, (Princeton University Press, 2024).
- Herzog, D: Unlearning Eugenics: Sexuality, Reproduction, and Disability in Post-Nazi Europe, (University of Wisconsin Press, George L. Mosse Series, 2018).
- Herzog, D: Cold War Freud: Psychoanalysis in an Age of Catastrophes, (Cambridge University Press 2016).
- Herzog, D: Sexuality in Europe: A Twentieth-Century History (Cambridge University Press 2011).
- Herzog D: Sex in Crisis: The New Sexual Revolution and the Future of American Politics (Basic 2008).
- Herzog D: Sex after Fascism: Memory and Morality in Twentieth-Century Germany (Princeton 2005); published in German translation as Die Politisierung der Lust: Sexualität in der deutschen Geschichte des 20. Jahrhunderts (Siedler/Random House 2005).
- Herzog D: Intimacy and Exclusion: Religious Politics in Pre-Revolutionary Baden (Princeton 1996; Transaction 2007).

Edited Collections

- Chelsea Schields and Dagmar Herzog, The Routledge Companion to Sexuality and Colonialism, (Routledge, 2021).
- Fritz Morgenthaler, On the Dialectics of Psychoanalytic Practice, edited and with an Introduction by Dagmar Herzog (Routledge, 2020).
- Rabinbach, An.: Staging the Third Reich, edited by S Geroulanos and D Herzog (Routledge 2020).
- Herzog D (ed): Brutality and Desire: War and Sexuality in Europe's Twentieth Century (Palgrave 2009).
- Herzog D (ed): Demokratie im Schatten der Gewalt: Geschichten des Privaten im deutschen Nachkrieg (with Daniel Fulda, Stefan-Ludwig Hoffmann, and Till van Rahden) (Wallstein 2008).
- Herzog D (ed): Sexuality in Austria (with Gunter Bischof, Anton Pelinka, and Josef Köstlbauer) (Transaction 2007).
- Herzog D (ed): Lessons and Legacies VII: The Holocaust in International Perspective (Northwestern 2006).
- Herzog D (ed): Sexuality and German Fascism (Berghahn 2004).

== See also ==
- Do Communists Have Better Sex? – a documentary she is featured in
