= Mark Nelson (police officer) =

Mark A. Nelson was born in 1957 and is a native of St. James, Minnesota, US. Col. Mark A. Nelson was the superintendent of the North Dakota Highway Patrol. He became a member of the highway patrol in 1981 in Rolla, ND and Devils Lake, ND. In 1988, he became a patrol officer in Grand Forks and was promoted to sergeant in 1989. He was then a graduate of the Northwestern University Traffic Institute's School of Police Staff and Command (1991). He was promoted to captain in 1996 as a district commander, and as superintendent in 2007, with a promotion to colonel. He graduated from Park University in Parkville, Missouri in 2002.

Preceded by Bryan R. Klipfel	North Dakota Highway Patrol Superintendent; 2007–2009	Succeeded by James Prochniak
