= Helga – Vom Werden des menschlichen Lebens =

- Australian film poster
- Directed by: Erich F. Bender
- Screenplay by: Erich F. Bender
- Produced by: Karl Ludwig Ruppel
- Starring: Ruth Gassmann; Eberhard Mondry; Ilse Zielstorff; Asgard Hummel
- Music by: Karl Barthel
- Production company: Rinco-Film
- Distributed by: Eckelkamp Verleihgesellschaft
- Release date: 22 September 1967 (Universum Film Theatre Frankfurt/Main)
- Running time: 77 min.
- Country: West Germany
- Language: German

Helga – Vom Werden des menschlichen Lebens (English: "Helga – On the Origins of Human Life", lit. "On the development of human life") is a 1967 West German sex education documentary and the first film of the Helga trilogy, starring Ruth Gassmann as Helga. Its release in West Germany was followed by international releases to many European countries, the British Commonwealth and the United States. It became one of the greatest box-office successes of West German cinema, viewed by forty million people in West Germany and internationally. In the first months of its showing in West Germany the audience had reached four million people. The film featured scenes of childbirth which were the first to be shown publicly in Germany. Helga was the first in a series of educational films which were considered "relatively permissive" at the time. The film was considered a part of an "enlightenment wave" which was undertaken by the West German Federal government at the time. In 1968, in France, the film was viewed by five million people. In Grenoble alone it is reported that 60,000 viewers had seen it in the first days of its screening, out of a population of 150,000. In Tours, the film played to full-houses for three consecutive weeks. The film used animation, stock footage and microphotography to depict the stages of life from conception to childbirth.

== Details ==
The film was produced between 1966 and 1967 by Rinco-Film in Munich for the West German Federal Ministry of Health under health minister Käte Ströbel through the German Health Museum. It documents the pregnancy of a young woman from the first visit to the doctor all the way to childbirth. Upon its release, it was classified as a documentary by the West German film classification board SPIO.

== Impact ==
The film has been studied due to its impact on German society involving the sociopolitical implications of the intervention by the West German federal government in matters of sexual education involving the mass media as well as the curriculum they approved regarding sexual matters. The West German federal government used the film as an educational tool but also as a means to gain influence in areas such as public health and education which were traditionally under regional jurisdiction, possibly even bypassing constitutional issues governing the distribution of powers between the Federal government and the regions. Up to that time, regional authorities could veto Federal policies which were seen by them as encroaching on their cultural policies.

The success of the film when viewed by an audience of a wide and diverse demographic was analysed in terms of its influence on social thinking. Gender issues related to the film have been considered due to the fact that matters traditionally concerning privacy, intimacy and femininity, up to that point in time, were made public to a wide demographic through film and the mass media. The commercial success of the film has also been examined since it was a sex-education film without any famous actors or an elaborate plot. The film was successful in countries such as France, Italy and England which were considered "prudish" at the time. In Paris, 1,500 Catholic priests and nuns attended a private screening of the film arranged by centrale catholique. The film was also extensively covered by print media such as Elle and Paris Match.

The film was a product of a political decision by the West German Federal government to educate the people regarding matters related to procreation and family planning at a time of advances in the fields of human genetics and contraception. The film gained acceptance in the young adult demographic due to their desire to be informed about issues related to family planning and childbirth as part of a consumer society in which women had to work. Educators, although worried about the impact of the violence of the scenes during childbirth upon the young, also accepted that the film could aid the understanding of husbands concerning the great pains experienced by their wives during childbirth. The film also presented a new model of informed motherhood based on knowledge and social awareness.

== Reception ==
The film received generally positive reviews, with the conservative press leading the way. Frankfurter Allgemeine Zeitung described the film as "enlightening in a comprehensive and rational manner, without hypocrisy and false shame". The critic added:

The cell proliferation is an aesthetic pleasure, an opal-like miracle of colour with effects of light and backlight, a piece of art from the era of Tachisme. The colours are so nice, the fast changes so wonderful that one nearly forgets the subject. Other processes [e.g. the representation of the different stages of the embryo] were still difficult to represent, some shots succeeded here for the first time; experts will rack their brains over how this was achieved

The conservative Mindener Tageblatt commented that "the really scientific information had been conveyed in a flawlessly proper manner without prudery and without arousing inappropriate sexual feelings".

The left-liberal press was more critical of the film. The Süddeutsche Zeitung critic remarked that:

We are at the point of wasting one of our basic rights: the right to keep silent and to privacy [verschlossene Türen] about certain aspects of life which should not be revealed to the public eye as they belong to the private sphere of human nature.

The press which was present at the sneak preview also criticised the film's "ridiculous frame action", "heavy didactic tone" and "lack of contraceptive information". Women correspondents also complained that Helga in "her perfect makeup" during childbirth "did not adequately depict the pain of the anonymous woman in labour".

Other audience reactions included those of some teenage girls which were shocked by the placenta removal scenes and the subsequent revelations that the placenta was used for the production of cosmetics. The perspective and appearance of medical instruments was also criticised as reminiscent of a horror film.

The Protestant Film Observer criticised the presentation aspects of the film and the absence of information on family planning, birth control and abortion.

== Award ==
- Golden Screen Award (German: Goldene Leinwand) by the German Cinema Board

== Cast ==
- Ruth Gassmann – Helga
- Eberhard Mondry – Helga's husband
- Ilse Zielstorff
- Asgard Hummel

== Sequels ==
- Helga und Michael (1968) – directed by Erich F. Bender
- Helga und die Männer - Die sexuelle Revolution (1969) - directed by Roland Cämmerer
