= North Dakota Highway Patrol =

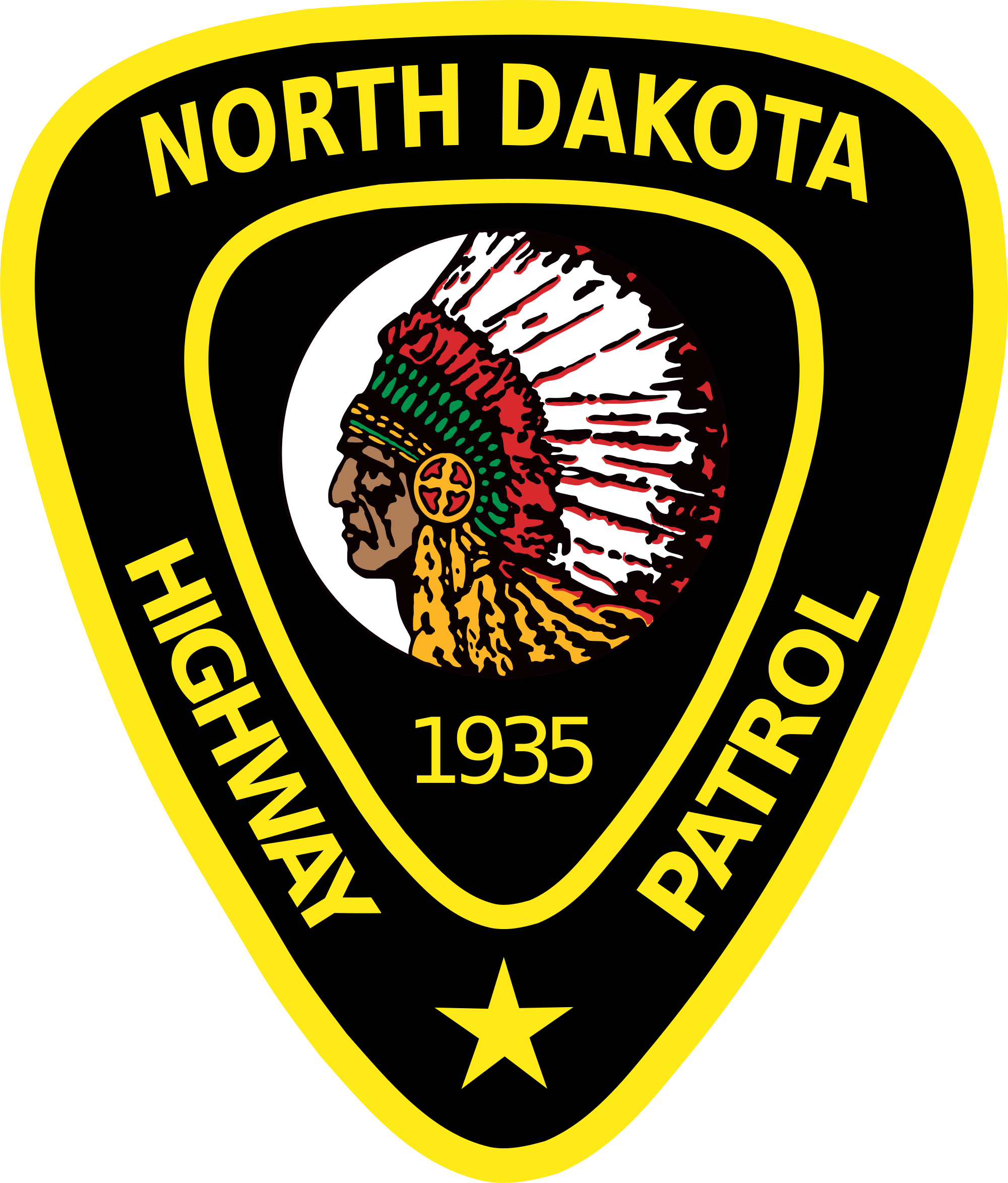
- Patch of North Dakota Highway Patrol

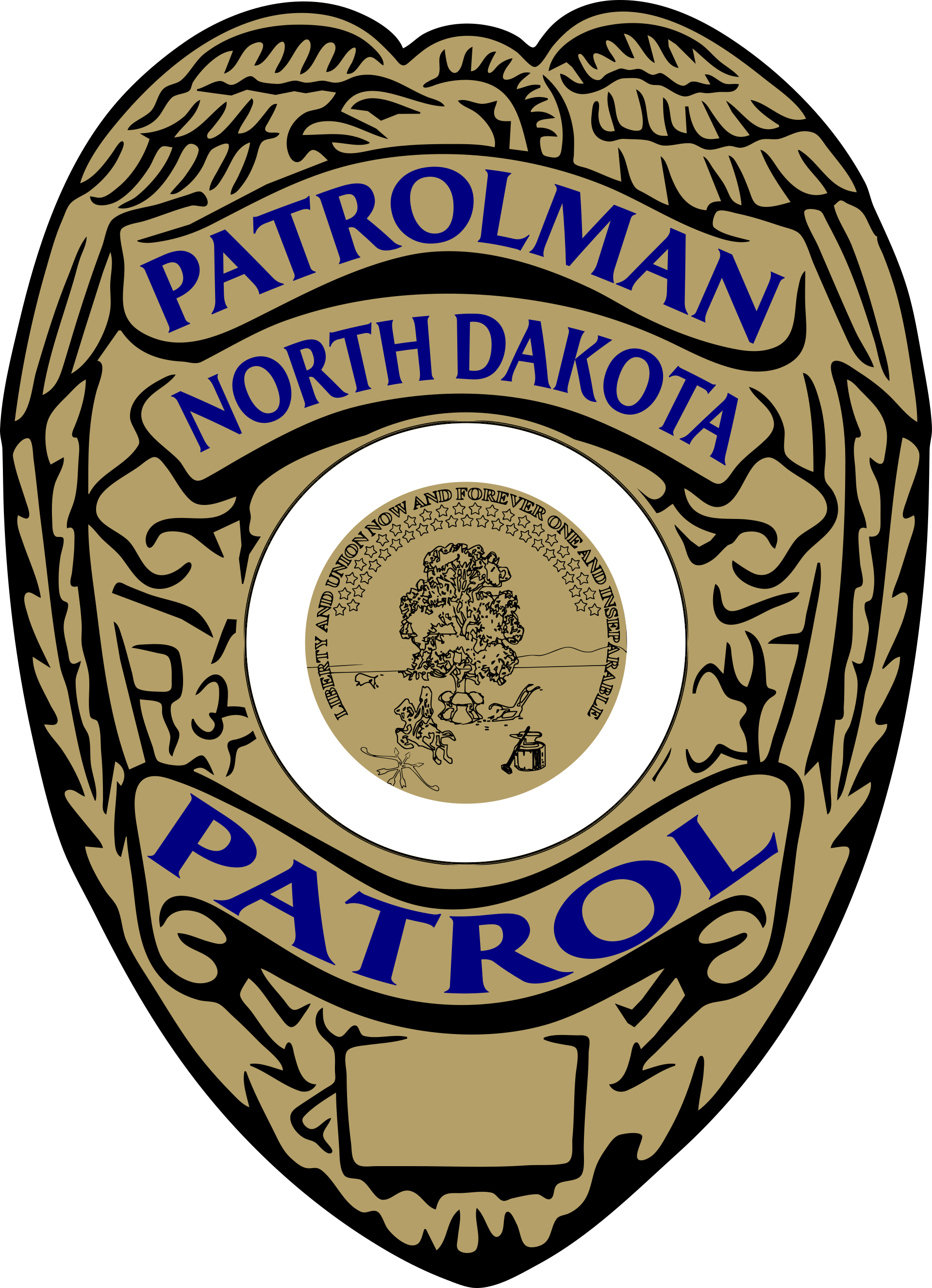
- Badge of North Dakota Highway Patrol

- Flag of North Dakota
- Abbreviation: NDHP

Agency overview
- Formed: 1935; 91 years ago
- Employees: 197 (as of 2021)
- Annual budget: $63,811,414 Million USD

Jurisdictional structure
- Operations jurisdiction: North Dakota, USA
- Area: 70,762 square miles (183,270 km^{2})
- Population: 779,094 (2020 est.)
- Legal jurisdiction: (North Dakota) Statewide
- General nature: Civilian police

Operational structure
- Headquarters: Bismarck, North Dakota
- Troopers: 159 (authorized, as of 2022)
- Civilians: 40 (as of 2021)
- Elected officer responsible: Kelly Armstrong, Governor of North Dakota
- Agency executive: Colonel Daniel J. Haugen, Superintendent
- Parent agency: North Dakota State Cabinet
- Regions: 4

Facilities
- Aircraft: Cessna 206; DJI Matrice 300 RTK

Website
- NDHP Website

The North Dakota Highway Patrol, also known as the North Dakota State Patrol, is the state police and highway patrol agency for North Dakota, with jurisdiction over the entire state. It is a division of the North Dakota State Cabinet. Colonel Daniel J. Haugen has been serving as the 18th superintendent since December 15, 2024.

North Dakota Highway Patrol established in 1935 by the North Dakota Legislative Assembly.

North Dakota state troopers, when hired, attend the Law Enforcement Training Academy in Bismarck. It is a 22-week program in which the recruits learn all Peace Officer Standards and Training as well as advanced traffic information. Troopers are assigned to many different post locations within the four regions upon graduating from the Academy.

Major activities of the State Patrol include: traffic enforcement, crash investigation, reporting road conditions, and enforcement of laws where state property is involved. A major duty of a North Dakota state trooper is the ability to work independently and exercise good judgement accordingly. This may differ from other peace officer agencies where operations are teamwork oriented.

== Regions ==
The state is divided into four regions. Each region is commanded by a regional commander and contains two offices located in the major cities of the region.

- Northeast Region: Grand Forks and Devils Lake
- Southeast Region: Fargo and Jamestown
- Southwest Region: Bismarck and Dickinson
- Northwest Region: Minot and Williston

Troopers work within their regions, however they have equal jurisdiction throughout the state.

== Highway Patrol symbol ==
The North Dakota Highway Patrol symbol is a profile of Red Tomahawk, a Teton Dakotah (Sioux) Indian who lived on his land near the Cannonball River on the Standing Rock Sioux Reservation near Mandan, North Dakota and who is famous for shooting Sitting Bull in the head. The North Dakota Highway Patrol officially adopted the profile of Red Tomahawk as the patrol vehicle door emblem and department symbol in 1951.

== Firearms ==
- Walther PDP - Current Issue
- SIG P320 - Phased out in 2026
- SIG P226 - Phased out in 2018

== Rank structure ==
The North Dakota Highway Patrol uses a paramilitary rank structure and has the following ranks:

Title	Insignia	Notes
Superintendent (rank of Colonel)		The Superintendent holds the rank of Colonel. Appointed by the Governor of North Dakota.
Major		Majors are responsible for a command within the Highway Patrol.
Captain		A captain is a troop commander in the Field Operations Bureau or a division commander in one of the other bureaus.
Lieutenant		A lieutenant is the assistant commander of a division/unit.
Sergeant		A Sergeant supervises an entire Patrol shift in His/Her respective District.
Trooper	No Insignia	Candidates successfully completing the academy and field training are appointed as troopers.

== Special Assignments ==
Troopers can serve in special roles including the following:

- Aviation (Manned and Unmanned)
- Crash Reconstruction Team (CRT)
- Cultural Liaison Officer
- Dignitary Protection
- Drug Recognition Expert (DRE)
- DUI Enforcement Team
- Emergency Response Team (ERT)
- Honor Guard
- K9 Program

== Superintendents of the North Dakota Highway Patrol ==
#	Name	Term
1	Frank Putman	1935–1937
2	H.G. Lund	1937–1938
3	Archie O’Connor	1939
4	Frank Putman	1939–1941
5	John Jeffery	1941–1943
6	E.M. Klein	1943–1953
7	Clark J. Monroe	1953–1961
8	Ralph M. Wood	1961–1978
9	James D. Martin	1978–1981
10	Norman D. Evans	1981–1985
11	Brian C. Berg	1985–1992
12	James M. Hughes	1993–2003
13	Bryan R. Klipfel	2003– 2007
14	Mark Nelson	2007–2009
15	James Prochniak	2009–2014
16	Michael Gerhart, Jr.	2014-2018
17	Brandon Solberg	2018-2024
18	Daniel J. Haugen	2024-Present

== Fallen officers ==
Since the organization was established, one North Dakota Highway Patrol officer has died while on duty.

== Vehicles ==
Current and historical patrol vehicles used by the North Dakota Highway Patrol.

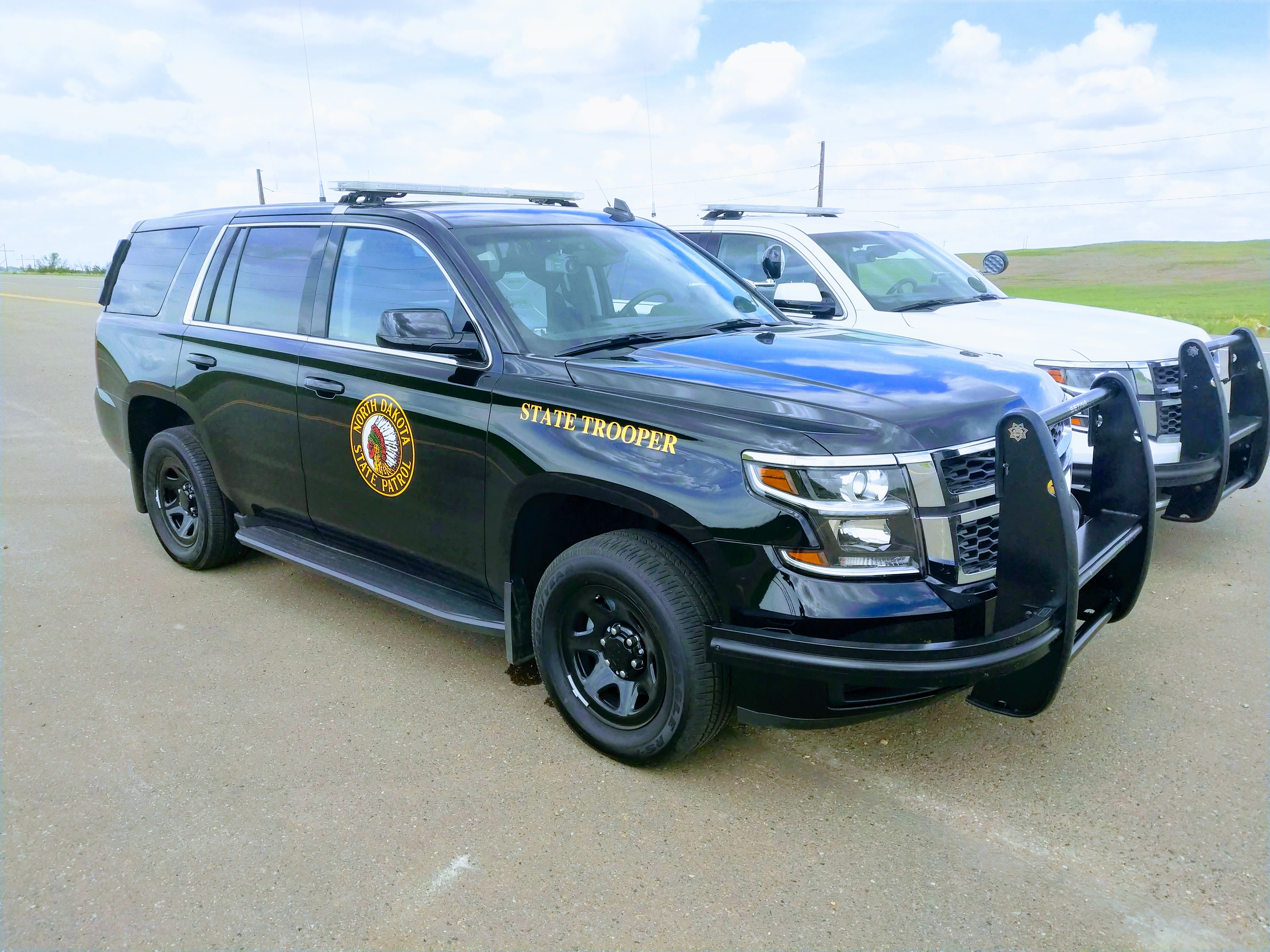

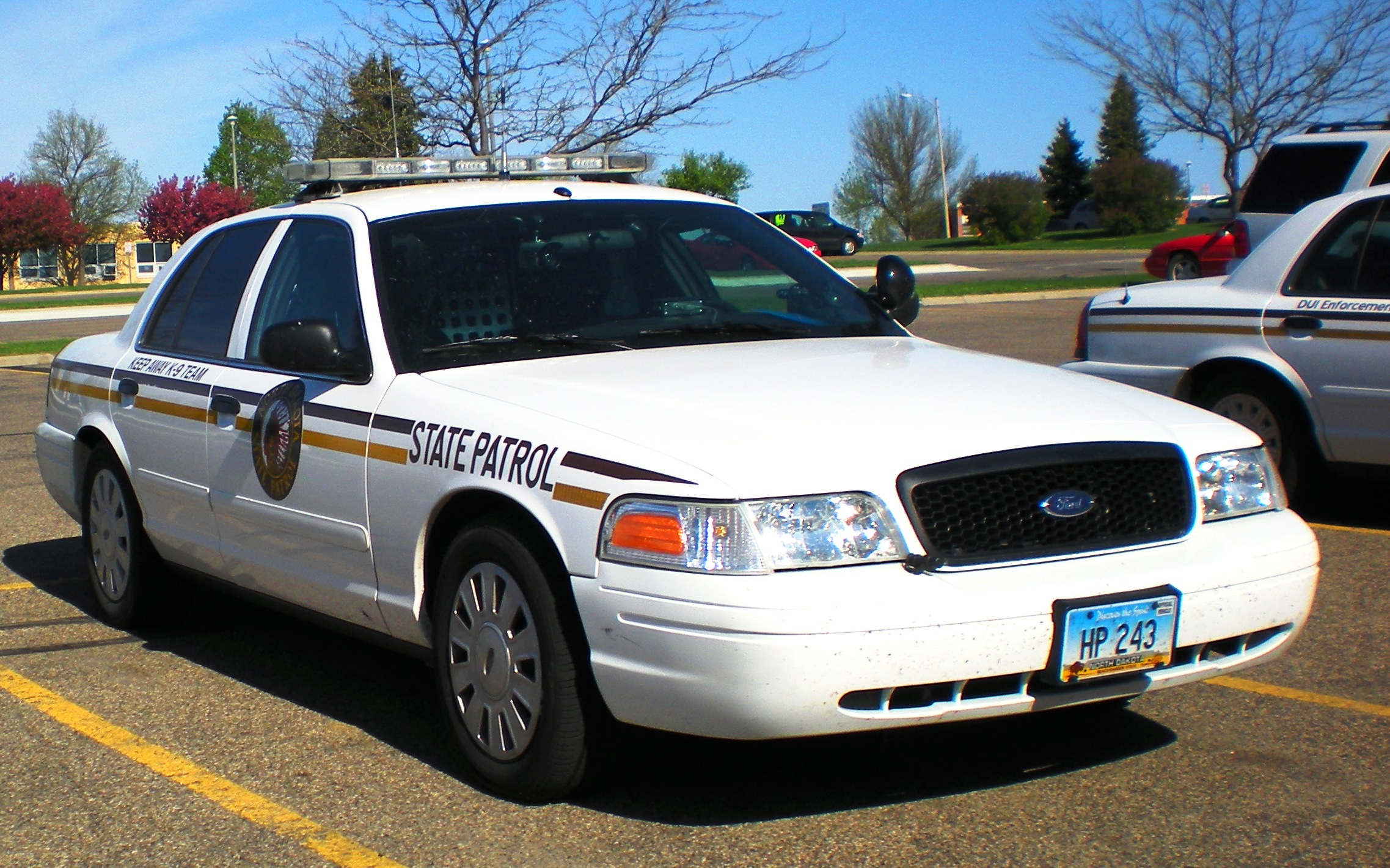

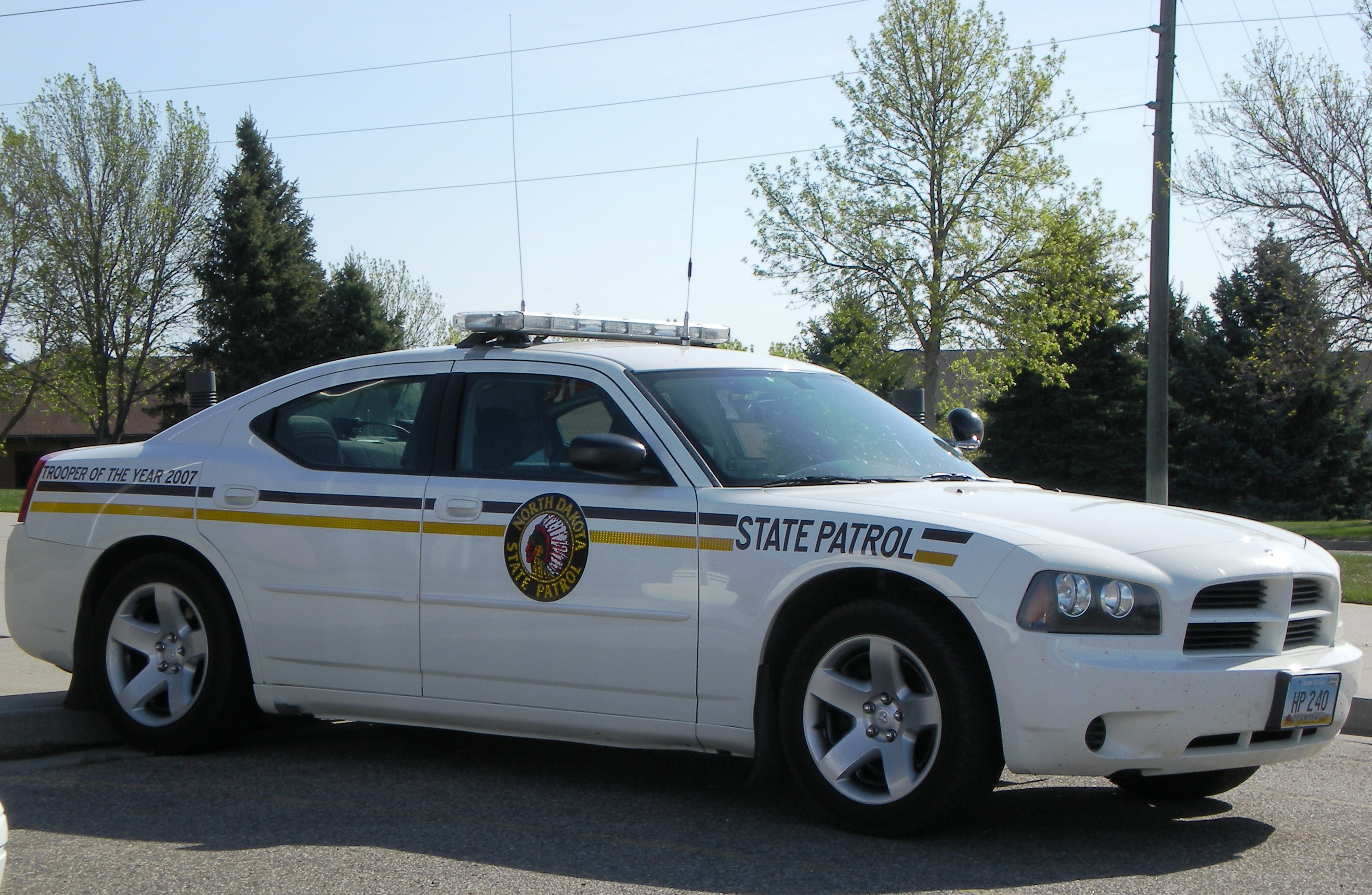

== See also ==
- List of law enforcement agencies in North Dakota
- State police
- Highway patrol
