= KelTec PR57 =

KelTec PR-5.7
- Type: Semi-automatic pistol
- Place of origin: United States

Production history
- Manufacturer: KelTec
- Produced: 2025–present

Specifications
- Mass: 0.866 lb (393 g) empty
- Length: 7.2 in (182 mm)
- Barrel length: 4.01 in (101.8 mm)
- Width: 0.94 in (23.8 mm)
- Height: 5.0 in (127 mm)
- Cartridge: 5.7x28mm.380 ACP (PR-3AT)
- Action: Short-recoil, Rotary barrel, double-action only
- Rate of fire: Semi-automatic
- Feed system: 20-round integral Magazine, fed by 10-round stripper clips, 14-round internal Magazine fed by 7 round stripper clips, (PR-3AT) 10 round internal Magazine (PR-3AT10).
- Sights: Iron sights (can accept pistol optics)

The KelTec PR-5.7 is a semi-automatic pistol manufactured by KelTec.

== Design ==
The weapon is chambered in the FN 5.7x28mm round, uses a rotating barrel locking operation and most unusually, uses a 20-round internal magazine fed from stripper clips (similar to the Steyr M1912 and the Grendel P10 .380).

The hammer rides at approximately the half-cock position, and the relatively long trigger pull moves the hammer to full-cock, then releases the hammer to strike the firing pin. There is a false reset on releasing the trigger; the actual reset is all the way at the front of trigger travel. The sights are fixed, albeit the front sight is held in place with a screw, and the rear sight is molded into the plastic rear slide cover. The rear of the slide is drilled and tapped for a rear optic plate, which comes in the box from the manufacturer.

Manufacture of the barrel and slide use a number of machining steps on a lathe, unusual for a slide, followed by more conventional mill work for final finishing. This likely lowers the manufacturing cost of the firearm. Two small guide rods and captive recoil springs are mounted underneath the rotating barrel. The pistol is very easy to field strip by unusually pushing the trigger forward, the magazine spring can be removed by punching out a pin in the baseplate and sliding the baseplate forward.

== Variants ==
=== PR-3AT ===
In January 2026, the PR-3AT chambered in .380 ACP was announced, holding 14 rounds. It features improved 7 round stripper clips and a 2.85 inch barrel, but it retains all features from the PR-57.

=== PR-3AT10 ===
The PR-3AT10 is a variant of the PR-3AT featuring a 10-round internal magazine, it comes with a 10 round stripper clip.

== Reception ==
American Rifleman praised its low recoil and pleasantness to shoot, quoting "makes for a capable-yet-unintimidating carry option", but notes its slowness to reload.

Shooting Illustrated noted the lack of a manual safety combined with a light trigger could be dangerous to the user, and the difficulty of unloading the gun, but praised its high-capacity and slender dimensions, quoting,

It could be the breakthrough handgun to mainstream the 5.7x28mm round—or it might not.

== See also ==
- Roth–Steyr M1907
- roth-teodorovic pistol
- Steyr M1912
- FN Five-seveN
- PSA 5.7 Rock
- TİSAŞ PX-5.7
- Ruger-5.7
