= Gemtech =

American firearms manufacturer

- Type: Private
- Industry: Defense
- Founded: 1993
- Headquarters: Eagle, Idaho, United States
- Key people: Ron Martinez
- Products: Suppressors, ammunition, accessories
- Website: www.gemtech.com

Gemtech (stylized as GEMTECH) is an American manufacturer of silencers (suppressors) for pistols, rifles, submachine guns, and personal defense weapons (PDWs). The company also produces ammunition and various accessories.

Gemtech was founded in 1993 in Boise, ID, and was later headquartered in Eagle, Idaho. GSL Technology of Jackson, Michigan designed and manufactured many of Gemtech's Suppressors from 1994 to 2016.

== Suppressors ==
Gemtech offers a variety of different silencers.

=== Rimfire suppressors ===
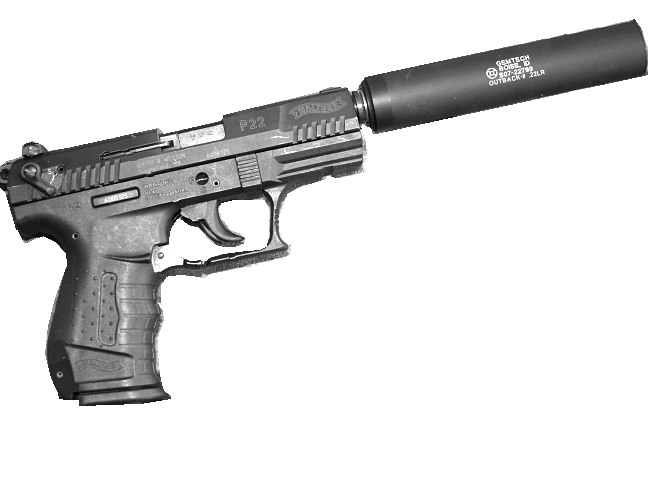
A Gemtech Outback suppressor mounted on a Walther P22.

- Outback: The Outback was a suppressor for handguns and rifles chambered in .22 lr.
- Quantum-200: The Quantum-200 was a .22 lr suppressor designed and sold in the 1990s.
- Vortex-2: The Vortex-2 was a .22 lr muzzle suppressor designed for handguns or rifles.
- LDES-2: The LDES-2 was a .22 lr handgun suppressor that is no longer in production.
- OASIS: The Oasis-P ("Pistol") and OASIS-R ("Rifle") were .22 lr integrally suppressed aluminum upper receivers for the Ruger MK II and Ruger MK III automatic pistols, and a silencer-integrated barrel for the Ruger 10-22 rifle; they were made in conjunction with Tactical Solutions, and are no longer in production.

=== Centerfire handgun suppressors ===
- GM-45: The GM-45 is a suppressor for pistols chambered in .45 ACP, 9mm Luger, 10mm Auto and .40 S&W.
- GM-9: The GM-9 is for 9mm and .300 Blackout (subsonic loads) firearms. It is rated for full-automatic fire.
- Tundra: The Tundra was a 9mm suppressor and it is designed to be fired "dry."
- Blackside-45: The Blackside-45 was a suppressor designed for handguns chambered in .45 ACP and .40 S&W.
- SFN-57: The SFN-57 was designed for use with the FN Five-seven automatic pistol chambered in SFN-57 5.7×28mm. It may also be utilized on firearms chambered in .17 HMR, .22 lr, and .22 WMR.
- Vortex-9: The Vortex-9 is a discontinued 9mm handgun suppressor.

=== Submachine gun and PDW suppressors ===
- RAPTOR-II: The RAPTOR-II is a suppressor for 9mm submachine guns such as the Uzi and MP5.
- RAPTOR-40: The RAPTOR-40 is a suppressor designed for submachine guns chambered in .40S&W and 10mm Auto, such as the UMP-40 or MP-5/10.
- VIPER: The VIPER is a suppressor designed for the MAC line of submachine guns (e.g., MAC-10, MAC-11) and will work with firearms chambered in .380 ACP, 9mm, and .45 ACP. The VIPER is small, lighter, and more efficient than original MAC suppressors.
- MOSSAD-II: The MOSSAD-II is a suppressor designed for the Uzi family of submachine guns.
- MK-9K: The MK-9K is a 9mm suppressor designed for use with open-bolt submachine guns.
- SAR57: The SAR57 is a 5.7mm suppressor designed for use with the SAR57. It is not recommended for use with the FN 5-7 pistol or P90 PDW.

=== Centerfire rifle suppressors ===
- GMT-300BLK: The GMT-300BLK is a suppressor for .300 Blackout rifles and carbines. It may be utilized with both super and subsonic ammunition.
- GMT-300WM: The GMT-300WM is for rifles chambered in .300 Winchester Magnum.
- GMT-556LE: The GMT-556LE is a 5.56mm rifle or carbine suppressor for designed for law enforcement use.
- GMT-556QM: The GMT-556QM is a 5.56mm automatic rifle or carbine suppressor for designed for military use.
- STORMFRONT: The STORMFRONT was a suppressor for .50 BMG rifles.
- TREK: The TREK is a 5.56mm "thread-on" suppressor for carbines and rifles.
- SANDSTORM: The SANDSTORM was a titanium 7.62×51mm NATO / .308 Winchester suppressor.
- QUICKSAND: The QUICKSAND was a light-weight, quick-detach version of the SANDSTORM.
- HVT-QM: The HVT-QM was a stainless steel, .30-caliber suppressor that uses Gemtech's Quickmount system.

== Ammunition ==
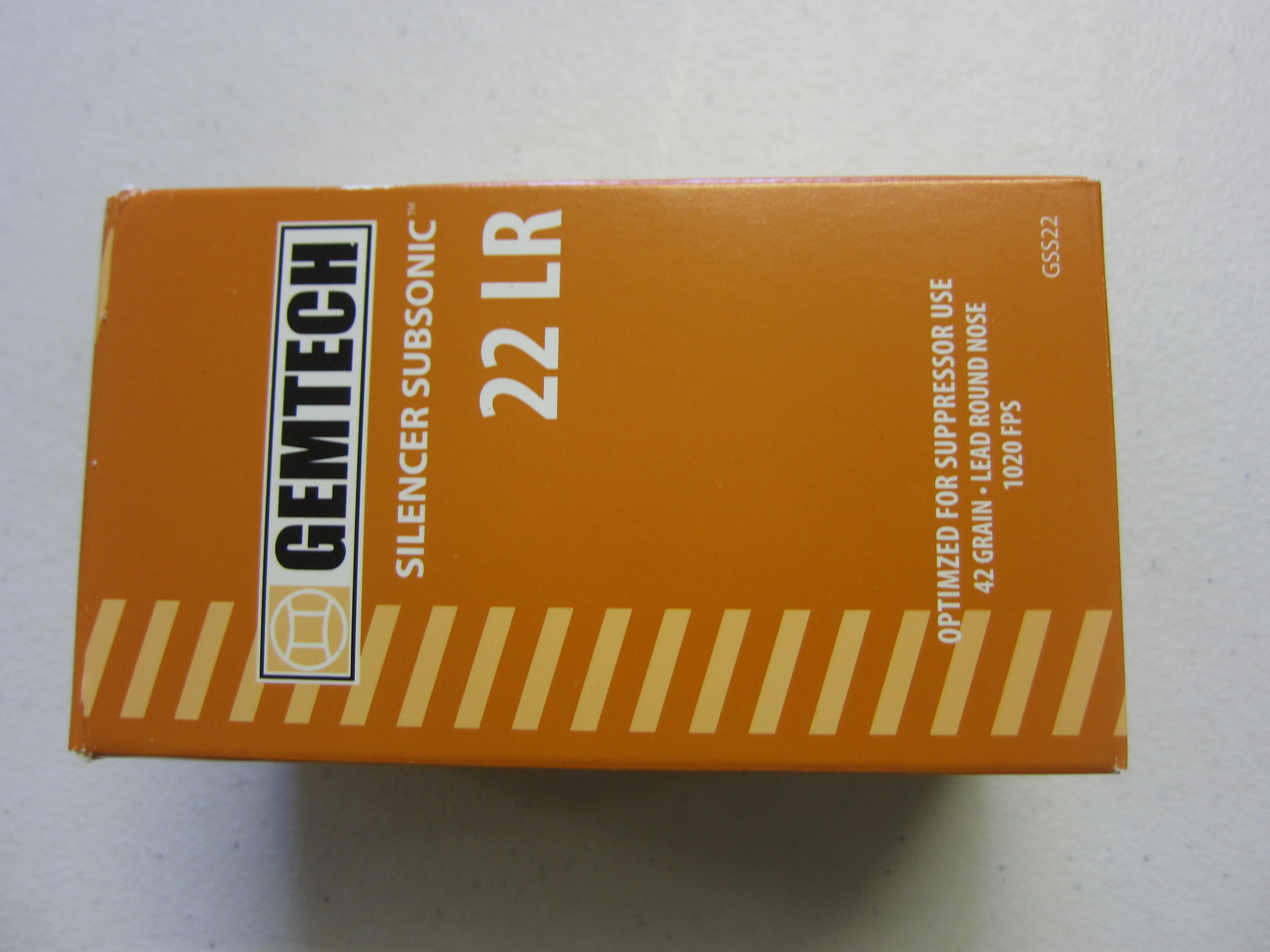
GemTech, Subsonic .22LR ammunition.

In 2011, Gemtech developed their own line of subsonic .22 Long Rifle ammunition optimized for use with sound suppressors. Kel Whelan, working with Brett Olin of CCI Ammunition came up with a round utilizing a unique 42 grain bullet and travelling at 1050 feet per second.

Two years later, the company began producing .300 Blackout ammunition in both supersonic and subsonic loads.

== American Suppressor Association ==
Gemtech was instrumental in forming the American Suppressor Association (ASA), a nonprofit trade association "to further the pursuit of education, public relations, legislation, hunting applications and military applications for the silencer industry".

== Purchase by Smith & Wesson ==
In July 2017, it was announced that Gemtech was purchased by firearm manufacturer, Smith & Wesson.

== See also ==
- Title II weapons
