= FN Five-seven =

Type of semi-automatic pistol

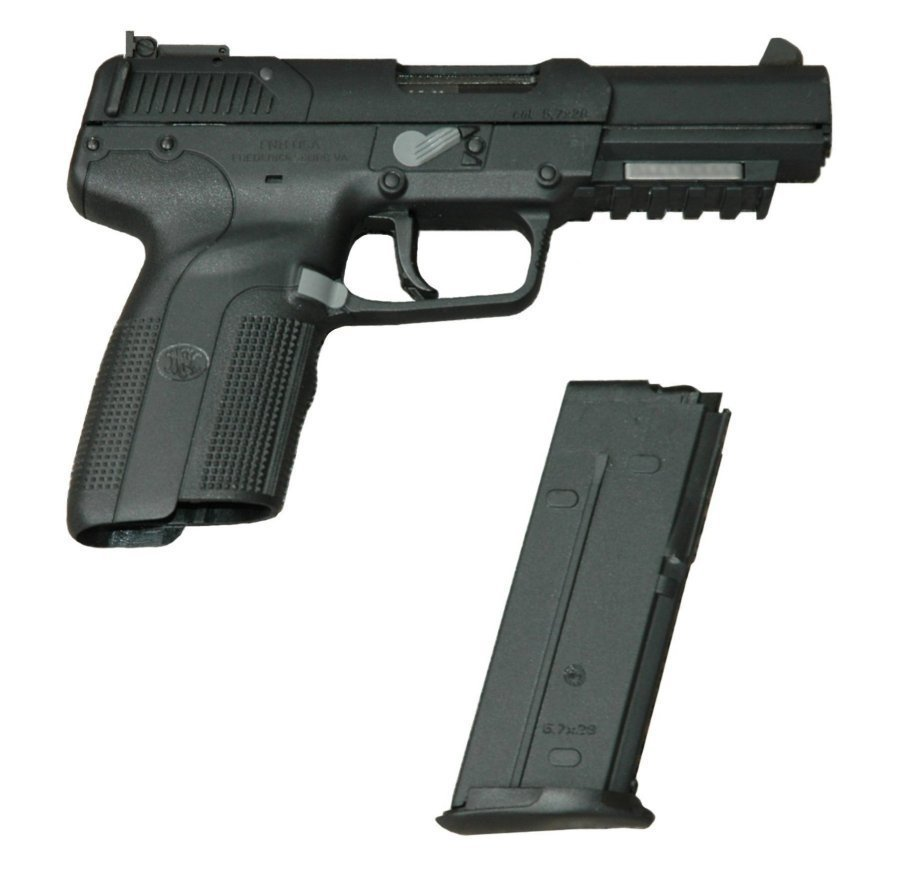
- Five-seveN USG with 20 round magazine fitting 5.7×28mm cartridges
- Type: Semi-automatic pistol
- Place of origin: Belgium

Service history
- In service: 2000–present
- Used by: 20+ nations (see Users)
- Wars: War in Afghanistan; Indonesian offensive in Aceh; Mexican drug war; Libyan Civil War

Production history
- Designer: FN Herstal
- Designed: 1993–1998
- Manufacturer: FN Herstal
- Produced: 1998–present
- Variants: See Variants

Specifications
- Mass: 610 g (1.3 lb) empty; 744 g (1.6 lb) loaded
- Length: 208 mm (8.2 in)
- Barrel length: 122 mm (4.8 in)
- Width: 36 mm (1.4 in)
- Height: 137 mm (5.4 in)
- Cartridge: FN 5.7×28mm
- Action: Delayed blowback
- Rate of fire: Semi-automatic
- Muzzle velocity: 762 m/s (2,500 ft/s) (SS198); 625 m/s (2,050 ft/s) (SS195); 520 m/s (1,700 ft/s) (SS197)
- Effective firing range: 50 m (55 yd)
- Maximum firing range: 1,510 m (1,651 yd)
- Feed system: Detachable box magazine; capacities: 10 rounds (restricted); 20 rounds (standard); 30 rounds (extended); Detachable drum magazine; capacity: 55 rounds
- Sights: "Three-dot" type: fixed or adjustable; 177.8 mm (7 in) sight radius

The FN Five-seven (stylized as FIVE-SEVEN® and Five-seveN) is a semi-automatic pistol designed and manufactured by FN Herstal in Belgium. The pistol is named for the 5.7×28mm cartridge's bullet diameter, and the trademark's capitalization style is intended to emphasize the manufacturer's initials—FN.

The Five-seven pistol was developed after the FN P90 personal defense weapon and the FN 5.7×28mm cartridge. The P90 was introduced in 1990, and the Five-seven was introduced in 1998 as a pistol chambered for the same 5.7×28mm ammunition. Developed as a companion pistol to the P90, the Five-seven shares many of its design features: it is a lightweight polymer-based weapon with a relatively large magazine capacity, ambidextrous controls, low recoil, and the ability to penetrate body armor when using certain cartridge types.

Sales of the Five-seven were originally restricted by FN to military and law enforcement customers, but since 2004, the pistol has also been offered to civilian shooters for uses such as personal protection and target shooting. Although offered only with sporting ammunition, the Five-seven's introduction to civilian shooters was met with vocal opposition from gun control organizations such as the Brady Campaign, and the pistol has been subject to ongoing controversy in the United States.

The Five-seven is currently in service with military and police forces in over 40 nations, including Canada, France, Greece, India, Poland, Spain, and the United States. In the United States, the Five-seven is in use with numerous law enforcement agencies, including the U.S. Secret Service. In the years since the pistol's introduction to the U.S. civilian market, it has become increasingly popular with civilian shooters.

== History ==
=== Development ===
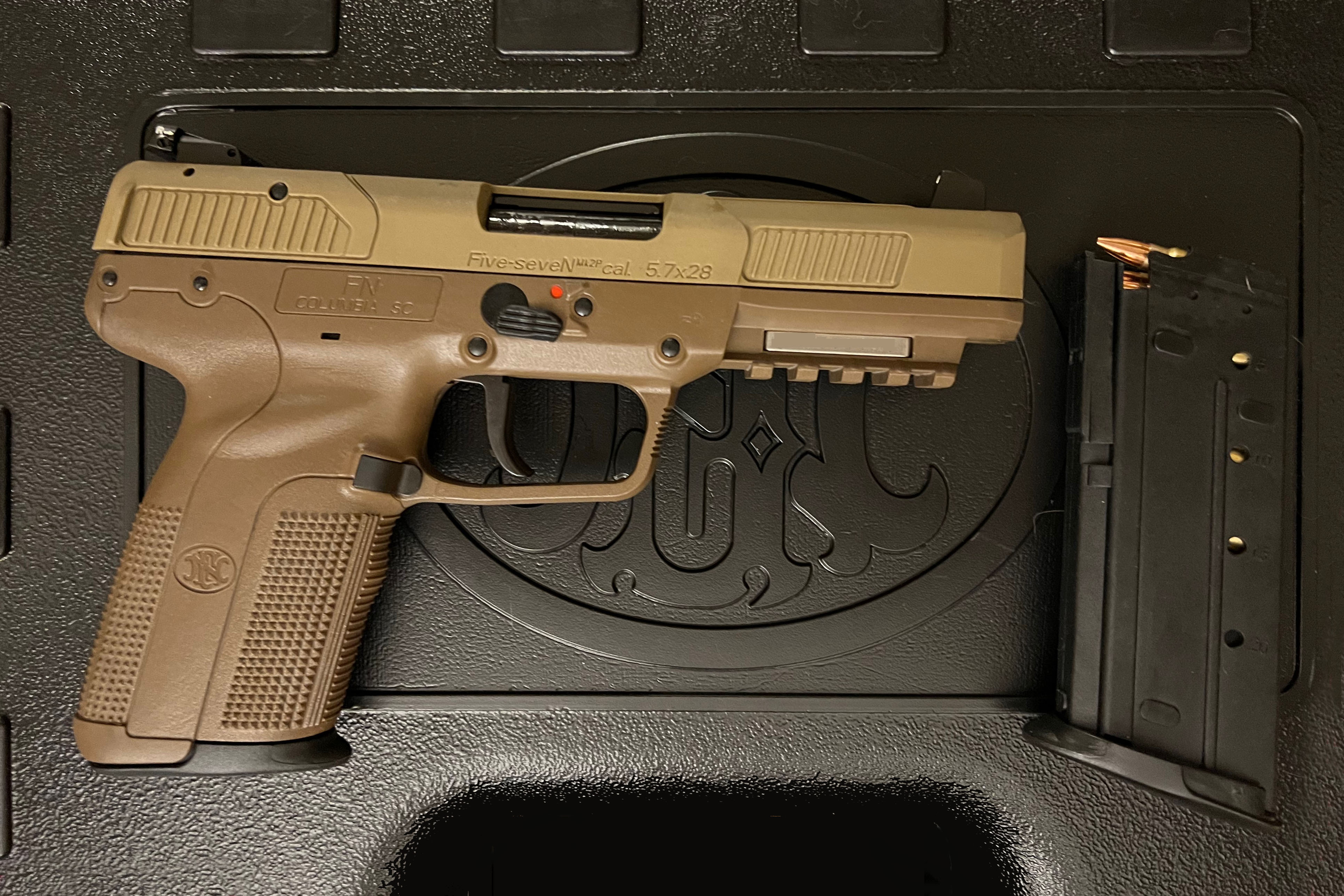
FN Five-seven (FDE) Flat Dark Earth

The Five-seven pistol and its 5.7×28mm ammunition were developed by FN Herstal in response to NATO requests for a replacement for the 9×19mm Parabellum cartridge and associated pistols and submachine guns. NATO called for two types of weapons chambered for a new cartridge—one a shoulder-fired weapon, and the other a handheld weapon. According to NATO, these new weapons, termed personal defense weapons (PDWs), were to provide "personal protection in last-resort situations when the user is directly endangered by the enemy [...]." In 1989, NATO published document D/296, outlining a number of preliminary specifications for these weapons:

- The new cartridge was to have greater range, accuracy, and terminal performance than the 9×19mm cartridge. Additionally, it was to be capable of penetrating certain types of body armor.
- The shoulder-fired personal defense weapon was to weigh less than 3 kg (6.6 lb), with a magazine capacity of at least 20 rounds.
- The handheld personal defense weapon (pistol) was to weigh less than 1 kg (2.2 lb), although a weight of 700 g (1.5 lb) was deemed desirable; it was to have a magazine capacity of no fewer than 20 rounds.
- Both weapons were to be sufficiently compact to be carried hands-free on the user's person at all times, whether in the cab of a vehicle or the cockpit of an aircraft, and were to perform effectively in all environments and weather conditions.

FN Herstal was the first small arms manufacturer to respond to NATO's requirement; FN started by developing a shoulder-fired personal defense weapon, the FN P90, along with a small caliber, high velocity 5.7×28mm cartridge type. The original 5.7×28mm cartridge, called the SS90, went into production with the P90 in 1990. This cartridge type was discontinued in 1993, and replaced with the 5.7×28mm SS190, which used a heavier and slightly shorter projectile weighing 2.0 g (31 grains). The reduced length of the SS190 projectile allowed it to be used more conveniently in the Five-seven, which was under development at that time.

In 1993, Jean-Louis Gathoye of FN filed a United States patent application for a delayed blowback operating system intended for the Five-seven pistol, and U.S. Patent 5,347,912 ("Elements for decelerating the recoil of the moving parts of a firearm") was received the following year. In 1995, FN officially announced development of the Five-seven pistol, and a prototype of the pistol was publicly displayed the following year. With some improvements, a double-action only model of the pistol went into production in 1998, and a single-action model called the Five-seven Tactical was then introduced shortly afterward. The Five-seven first entered service in May 2000, when the Cypriot National Guard (Greek: Εθνική Φρουρά) purchased 250 pistols for their special forces group.

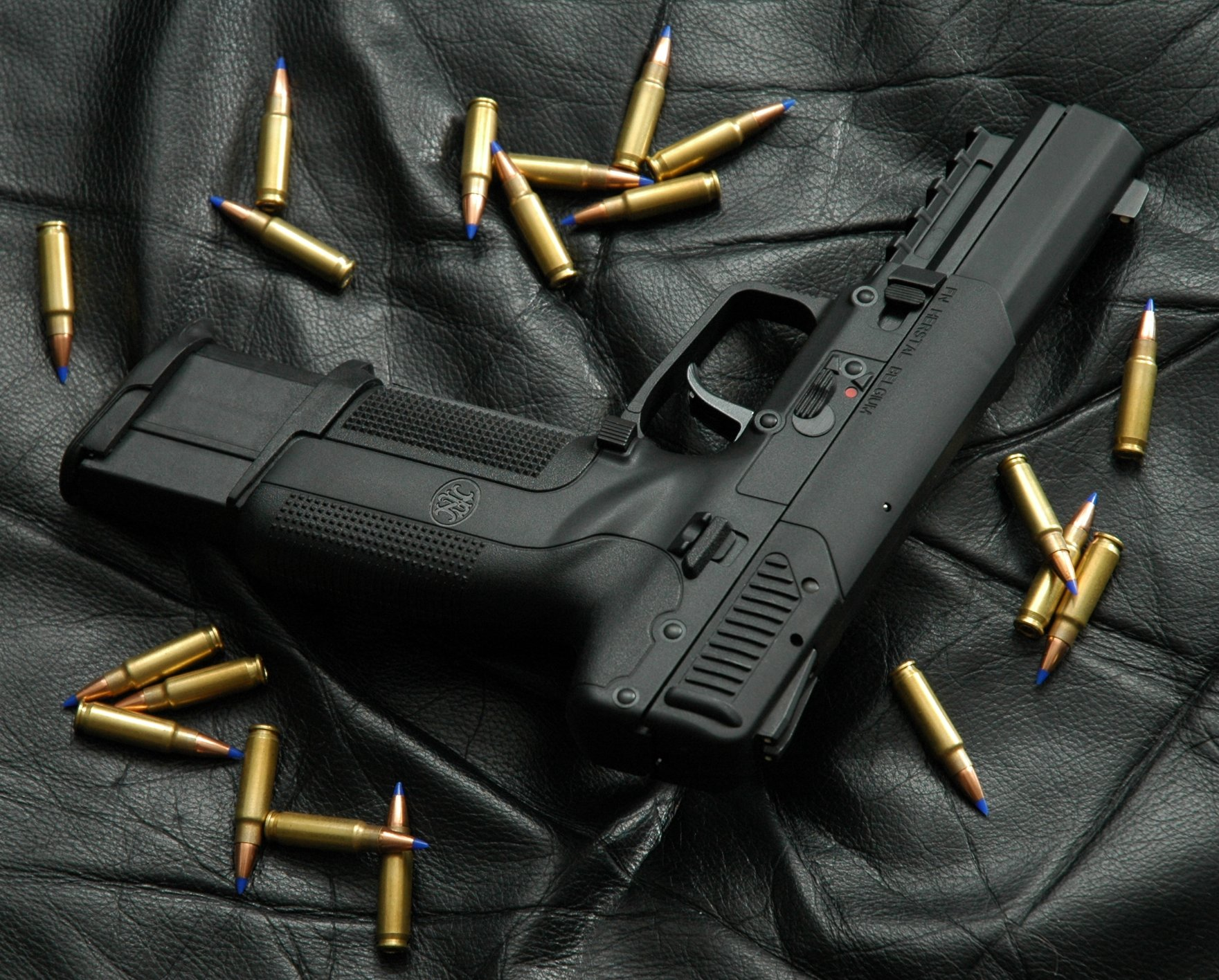
Polymer materials are used extensively in the Five-seven's design; even the steel slide is encased in a polymer shell.

=== NATO evaluation ===
In 2002 and 2003, NATO conducted a series of tests with the intention of standardizing a PDW cartridge as a replacement for the 9×19mm Parabellum cartridge. The tests compared the relative merits of the FN 5.7×28mm cartridge and the HK 4.6×30mm cartridge, which was created by German small arms manufacturer Heckler & Koch as a competitor to the 5.7×28mm. The results of the NATO tests were analyzed by a group formed of experts from Canada, France, the United Kingdom, and the United States, and the group's conclusion was that the 5.7×28mm was "undoubtedly" the more efficient cartridge.

At the time, the German delegation and others rejected the NATO recommendation that 5.7×28mm should be standardized, delaying the standardization until its eventual completion in February 2021. Despite this delay, both the 4.6×30mm and 5.7×28mm cartridges (and the associated weapons) have been independently adopted by various NATO countries, according to preference; the Five-seven pistol is currently in service with military and police forces in over 40 nations throughout the world (see FN Five-seven § Users).

=== Present ===
At first, sales of the Five-seven pistol were restricted by FN to military and law enforcement customers, but in 2004 the new Five-seven IOM model was introduced and offered to civilian shooters for use with 5.7×28mm sporting ammunition. The IOM model incorporated several modifications to the weapon's design, such as the addition of an M1913 accessory rail, a magazine safety mechanism, and fully adjustable sights.

Further development of the Five-seven pistol led to the introduction of the Five-seven USG model, which was approved by the ATF as a sporting firearm in 2004. The USG model incorporates a conventionally shaped square trigger guard, a reversible magazine release, and other minor changes.

The Five-seven MK2 was introduced in 2013, replacing the USG model. The MK2 model has cocking serrations on the front of the slide, all black controls, and slightly different iron sights.

The Five-seven MK3 MRD was introduced at Eurosatory in 2022, introducing the possibility to mount a Mini Red Dot on top of the slide, a threaded barrel, making it possible to use a silencer, a new texture pattern on the grip and deeper slide serrations.

== Design ==
The Five-seven is a semi-automatic delayed blowback pistol chambered for FN's 5.7×28mm ammunition. The pistol has a concealed hammer. Polymer materials are used extensively in the pistol's design, and even the steel slide is encased in a polymer shell. This provides reduced weight and greater resistance to corrosion. The slide's polymer shell gives the pistol the appearance of being constructed entirely of polymers, but the slide interior, barrel, trigger, springs, pins, and similar parts are all steel. However, the pistol is unusually lightweight, weighing only 744 g (1.6 lb) with a loaded 20-round magazine.

The Five-seven is a full-size pistol, having an overall length of 208 mm (8.2 in), a height of 137 mm (5.4 in), and a max width of 36 mm (1.4 in). It has the same grip angle as the distinguished Browning Hi-Power and M1911 pistols. Despite the considerable length of the pistol's 5.7×28mm ammunition, the grip is not particularly unwieldy—the distance from the trigger to the back of the grip measures 69.85 mm (2.750 in), which is identical to a U.S. Military issue M9 pistol chambered in 9×19mm Parabellum. The Five-seven barrel is cold hammer-forged and chrome-lined, with a total length of 122 mm (4.8 in) and a rifled length of 94 mm (3.7 in). The barrel has eight rifling grooves with a right-hand twist rate of 1:231 mm (1:9.1 in), and it weighs 113 g (0.249 lb). The small caliber gives the barrel a length in calibers of more than 20, 58% more than a comparable 9x19 barrel. It has a stated service life of 20,000 rounds and the Five-seven is noted for being very accurate.

Current models of the Five-seven are single-action, having a short and light trigger pull of 20 to 30 N (4.4 to 6.6 lb_{F}). They have a Picatinny rail for mounting accessories, and a magazine safety mechanism that prevents the pistol from firing without a magazine inserted. The grip texture on current pistols is extensively checkered for a superior hold, and each side of the slide has a series of narrow ridges at the rear to aid grasping. The trigger and trigger guard surfaces also have grooves to reduce finger slip, and the trigger guard is elongated to ease firing while wearing gloves. The Five-seven is currently offered in two different frame finishes (standard black or flat dark earth), and two different iron sight systems (adjustable sights or low profile fixed sights).

=== Ammunition ===
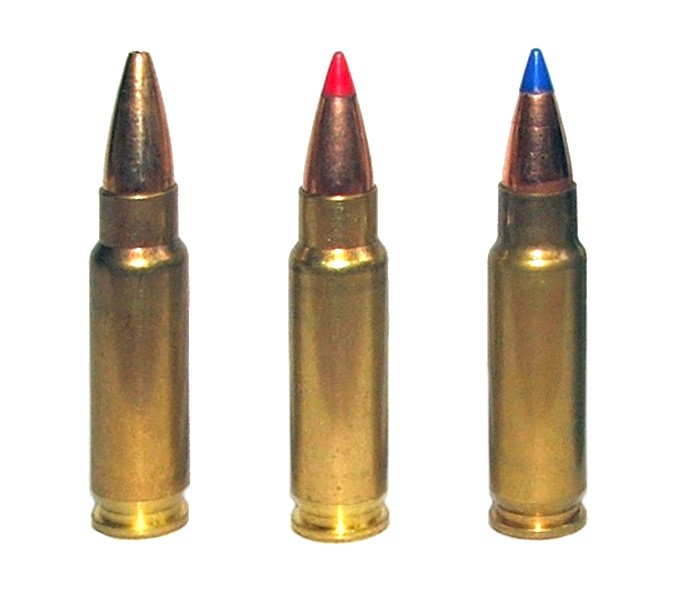
5.7×28mm cartridges as used in the Five-seven. From left to right: SS195LF hollow point, SS196SR V-Max, and SS197SR V-Max.

Particularly significant to the design of the Five-seven pistol is the small caliber, high velocity bottlenecked cartridge it uses. The 5.7×28mm cartridge was created by FN Herstal in response to NATO requests for a replacement for the 9×19mm Parabellum cartridge, which is commonly used in pistols and submachine guns. The 5.7×28mm cartridge weighs 6.0 g (93 grains)—significantly lighter than the average 9×19mm Parabellum cartridge (M882 NATO total cartridge weight of 12 grams (180 grains))—making extra ammunition less burdensome, or allowing more ammunition to be carried for the same weight. Since the 5.7×28mm cartridge also has a relatively small diameter, an unusually high number of cartridges can be contained in a magazine. The cartridge has a loud report and produces considerable muzzle flash, but it has roughly 30 percent less recoil than the 9×19mm cartridge, improving controllability. Due to its high velocity, the 5.7×28mm also exhibits an exceptionally flat trajectory.

One of the design intents for the standard 5.7×28mm cartridge type, the SS190, was that it would have the ability to penetrate Kevlar protective vests—such as the NATO CRISAT vest—that will stop conventional pistol bullets. Fired from the Five-seven, the 5.7×28mm SS190 has a muzzle velocity of roughly 650 m/s (2,130 ft/s) and is capable of penetrating the CRISAT vest at a range of 100 m (110 yd), or 48 layers of Kevlar material (roughly equivalent to two stacked Level II Kevlar vest panels) at a range of 50 m (55 yd). It is also capable of penetrating a PASGT vest at a range of 300 m (330 yd) or a PASGT helmet at a range of 240 m (260 yd). FN states an effective range of 50 m (55 yd) and a maximum range of 1,510 m (1,650 yd) for the 5.7×28mm cartridge when fired from the Five-seven pistol.

In testing conducted by Passaic County, New Jersey Sheriff's Department, the 5.7×28mm SS190 penetrated to a depth of 27 cm (11 in) in bare ballistic gelatin, and a depth of 23 cm (9.1 in) in gelatin protected with a Kevlar vest. In testing, the SS190 and similar 5.7×28mm projectiles consistently turn base over point ("tumble") as they pass through ballistic gelatin and other media, using the 21.6-mm (.85 in) projectile length to create a larger wound cavity. However, some are skeptical of the bullet's terminal performance, and it is a subject of debate among civilian shooters in the United States.

The 5.7×28mm projectile potentially poses less risk of collateral damage than conventional pistol bullets, because the projectile design limits overpenetration, as well as risk of ricochet. The lightweight projectile also poses less risk of collateral damage in the event of a miss, because it loses much of its kinetic energy after traveling only 400 m (440 yd), whereas a conventional pistol bullet such as the 9×19mm retains significant energy beyond 800 m (870 yd). This range exceeds the engagement distances expected for the 5.7×28mm cartridge's intended applications, so the cartridge's limited energy at long range is not considered to be disadvantageous. Since the 5.7×28mm SS190 projectile does not rely on fragmentation or the expansion of a hollow-point bullet, the cartridge and pistol are considered suitable for military use under the Hague Convention of 1899, which prohibits the use of expanding bullets in warfare.

Ballistic performance summary for various 5.7×28mm cartridges
Cartridge type	SS190	SS195LF	SS197SR	EA Protector	EA Varmintor	EA S4
Projectile weight	2.0 g (31 gr)	1.8 g (28 gr)	2.6 g (40 gr)	2.6 g (40 gr)	2.3 g (35 gr)	1.8 g (28 gr)
Muzzle velocity	650 m/s (2,100 ft/s)	625 m/s (2,050 ft/s)	520 m/s (1,700 ft/s)	610 m/s (2,000 ft/s)	640 m/s (2,100 ft/s)	770 m/s (2,500 ft/s)
Muzzle energy	424 J (313 ft⋅lb)	350 J (260 ft⋅lb)	350 J (260 ft⋅lb)	480 J (350 ft⋅lb)	480 J (350 ft⋅lb)	535 J (395 ft⋅lb)

=== Feeding ===
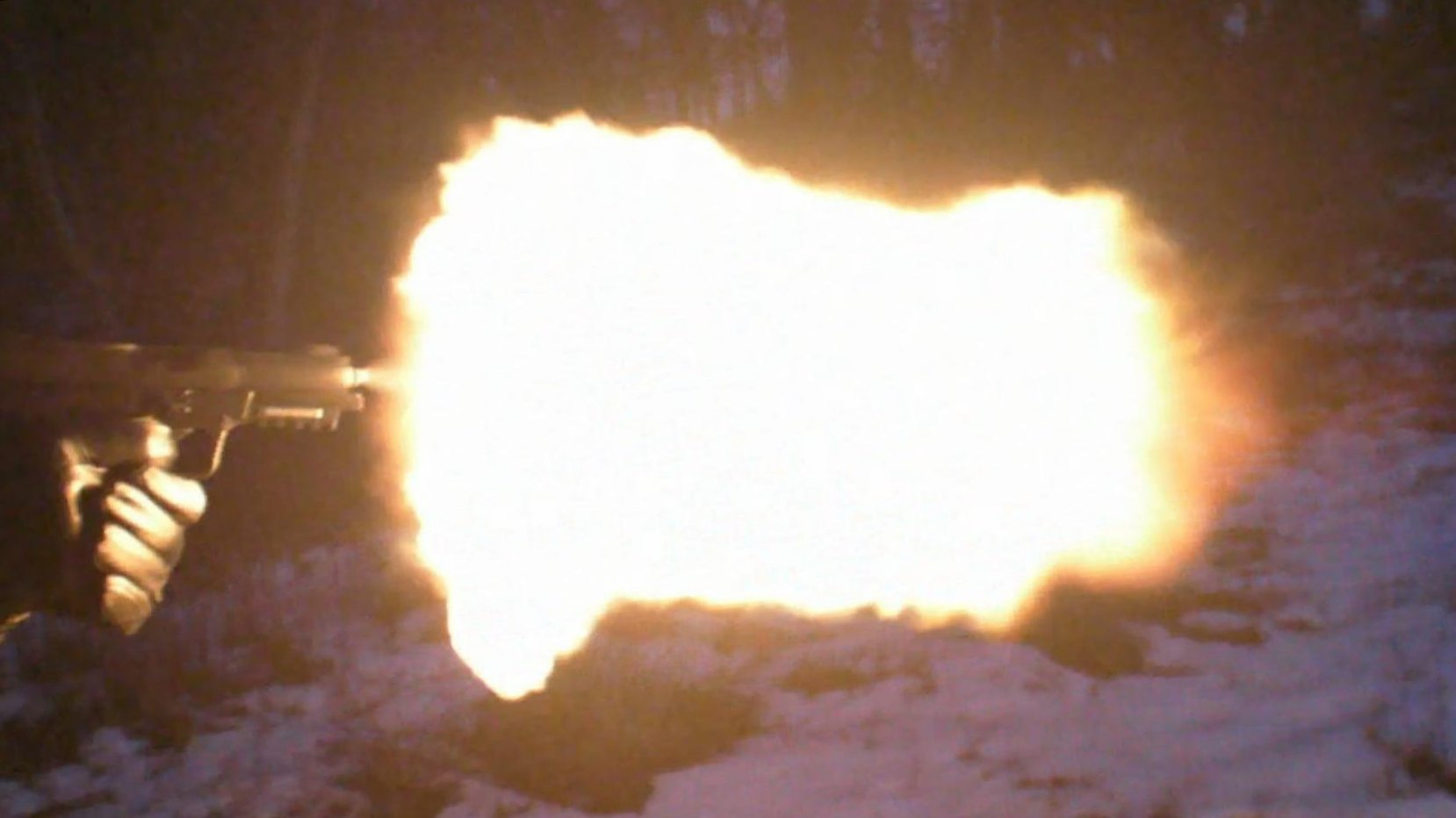
The Five-seven has a loud report and produces considerable muzzle flash, but it has roughly 30% less recoil than a 9×19mm pistol, improving controllability.

The Five-seven pistol feeds from detachable box magazines, but it is unconventional in that it feeds cartridges into the chamber without the use of a barrel feed ramp, having a beveled chamber only—the pistol's feeding is inherently reliable because of its use of bottlenecked cartridges. The pistol is supplied with 20-round magazines as standard, or 10-round magazines for jurisdictions with a high-capacity magazine ban. The Five-seven will also accept an aftermarket extended 30-round magazine, which protrudes an additional 38 mm (1.5 in) from the base of the pistol. With an additional cartridge in the chamber, the Five-seven pistol has a total capacity of 11, 21, or 31 rounds depending on which magazine type is used. Magazine pouches for the Five-seven magazine are available from various manufacturers.

The Five-seven's magazine can be disassembled for cleaning or lubrication by removing the polymer floorplate. The magazine body is constructed of polymer, with steel inserts at the feed lips. Unlike a conventional pistol magazine, it is a double-stack staggered-feed magazine, with a follower that has the same appearance as that of an M16 rifle's magazine, and which is loaded in the same manner: by pushing cartridges straight down into the magazine, rather than pushing them down and back. This setup makes it very easy to load individual cartridges into the magazine. The magazine floorplate has a slight finger spur, and four holes in the left side of the magazine body allow a convenient estimate of the amount of remaining ammunition.

=== Controls ===
All controls (excluding the trigger) on the Five-seven USG and earlier models are grey polymer, in contrast to the black polymer frame and slide cover. Similarly, all of the controls on the Five-seven FDE and Five-seven ODG models are black polymer, in contrast to the flat dark earth and olive drab polymer frames. A takedown lever is located at the front on the left side of the weapon's frame, and a slide release is located at the rear on the left side of the frame; these controls are protected from accidental movements by slight projections in the frame contour. A chamber indicator, in the form of a pin inside a tiny hole, is provided on the left side of the slide. When a round has been chambered, this pin will protrude 1.6 mm (0.063 in), which is sufficient to provide both visible and tactile indication of the chamber's status.

Current models of the Five-seven have an ambidextrous manual safety device, which is located in an unconventional position: one control is found on each side of the frame above the trigger guard, where it is reachable with the trigger finger or support hand thumb. A red dot is visible here when the safety is deactivated and the pistol is ready to fire; when the safety is moved to the raised position, it is activated and the red dot is no longer visible. The pistol's push-button magazine release, located on the left side of the frame where the trigger guard intersects with the grip, is square-shaped and reversible for left-handed shooters.

The Five-seven can be disassembled quickly and easily, by using the left hand to retract and hold the slide 5 mm (0.20 in) rearwards, while simultaneously using the left-hand thumb to push and hold the takedown lever rearwards. When the slide is released, it moves forward freely and the complete slide assembly can be disengaged from the frame, whereupon the barrel (and captured recoil spring) can be removed from the slide. This level of disassembly is sufficient to perform thorough cleaning of the pistol, and FNH USA recommends no further disassembly except by an authorized armorer, FN Herstal, or FNH USA. Reassembly of the pistol is done in the reverse order, except no use of the disassembly lever is necessary.

=== Sights and accessories ===
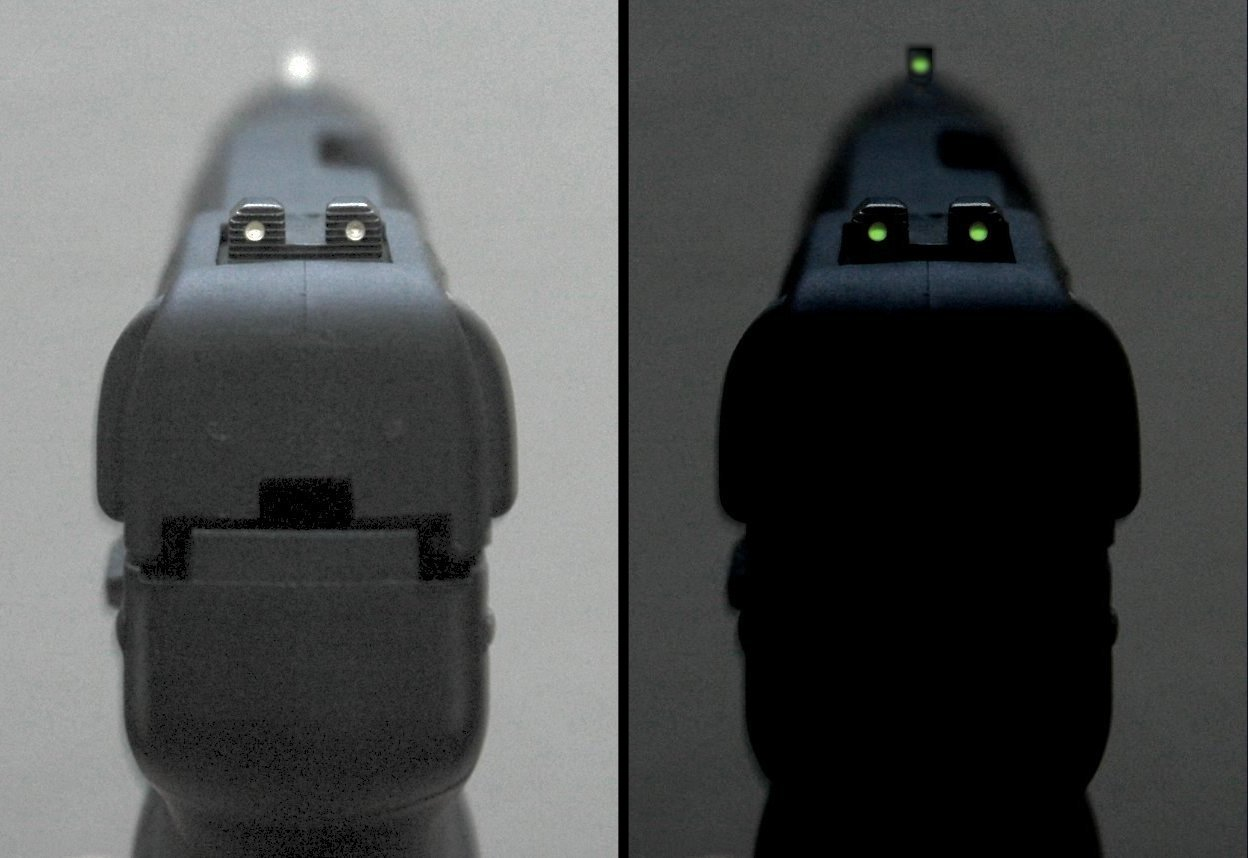
The tritium-illuminated fixed sights of the Five-seven USG pistol, in normal and dim lighting.

The Five-seven has a sight radius of 178 mm (7.0 in); the pistol is currently offered with either adjustable sights or fixed sights. The "three-dot" type adjustable sights consist of a 2.9-mm (0.12 in) square notch rear and a 3.6-mm (0.14 in) blade front, which has a height of 9.2 mm (0.36 in). The sights are targeted at 91.4 m (100.0 yd), but can be adjusted for either windage or elevation. The "three-dot" type C-More fixed sights, which are offered as a low profile alternative to the adjustable sights, can only be adjusted for windage. The fixed sights are targeted at 7.6 m (25 ft) using SS195LF ammunition, and are available with or without tritium-illuminated inserts ("night sights") to aid use of the pistol in dim lighting.

The Five-seven is supplied with a lockable hard case, a locking device and keys, a magazine release reversal tool, a sight adjustment tool (not included with the fixed sights model), a cleaning kit, an owner's manual, and three 20-round magazines (or three 10-round magazines, where restricted by law).

The Five-seven can be used in conjunction with a wide range of firearm accessories; holsters are offered by various manufacturers, and the pistol's MIL-STD-1913 (Picatinny) accessory rail will accept tactical lights or laser aiming devices. With the use of an extended, threaded barrel, the pistol can also be fitted with various sound suppressors developed by Advanced Armament Corporation, Gemtech, Silencerco, and other manufacturers. The Gemtech SFN-57, which was developed in 1998 specifically for use with the Five-seven, is a matte black aluminum suppressor with a length of 147 mm (5.8 in), a diameter of 32 mm (1.3 in), and a weight of 147 g (0.324 lb). Israeli manufacturer FAB Defense offers a complete PDW conversion kit for the Five-seven, designated the KPOS G2 FN 5.7, that allows the pistol to be reconfigured into a shoulder-fired personal defense weapon, and CornerShot offers a weapon system compatible with the Five-seven that allows the shooter to aim and fire around corners without being exposed.

== Variants ==
Five-seven
The original Five-seven was introduced in 1998, and it is now discontinued. It had no manual safety device and it was double-action only, with a heavy trigger pull of 4.5 to 6.5 daN (10 to 14 lb_{F}); its double-action only trigger was harshly criticized. The original Five-seven had a pebbled grip pattern, a smoothly contoured accessory rail, low profile fixed sights and a large circular-shaped trigger guard designed to facilitate gloved use. It did not have a slide release and the slide was not serrated as on newer models, but a portion at the rear of the slide was instead slightly concave to aid grasping. The pistol also had slightly different markings, with an FN logo placed on the left side of the frame above the trigger guard.

Five-seven Tactical
The Five-seven Tactical was introduced shortly after the original double-action only model, as a single-action alternative. It had a short and light trigger pull of 2 to 3 daN (4.4 to 6.6 lb_{F}), as on current models. It also had the addition of an ambidextrous manual safety device (located on each side of the frame, as on current models), and a slide release. Aside from these modifications, the Tactical model was identical to the original double-action only Five-seven. It was discontinued following the introduction of the IOM model.

Five-seven IOM
The Five-seven IOM (Individual Officer Model) was the first model of the Five-seven pistol to be offered to civilian shooters, debuting in 2004. It is now discontinued in favor of the USG model. The IOM was similar in its basic design to the Tactical version, but differed in that it had a MIL-STD-1913 (Picatinny) accessory rail, a serrated slide and trigger guard, and fully adjustable sights. It also had a magazine safety mechanism incorporated into the design, to prevent the pistol from being fired without a magazine inserted.

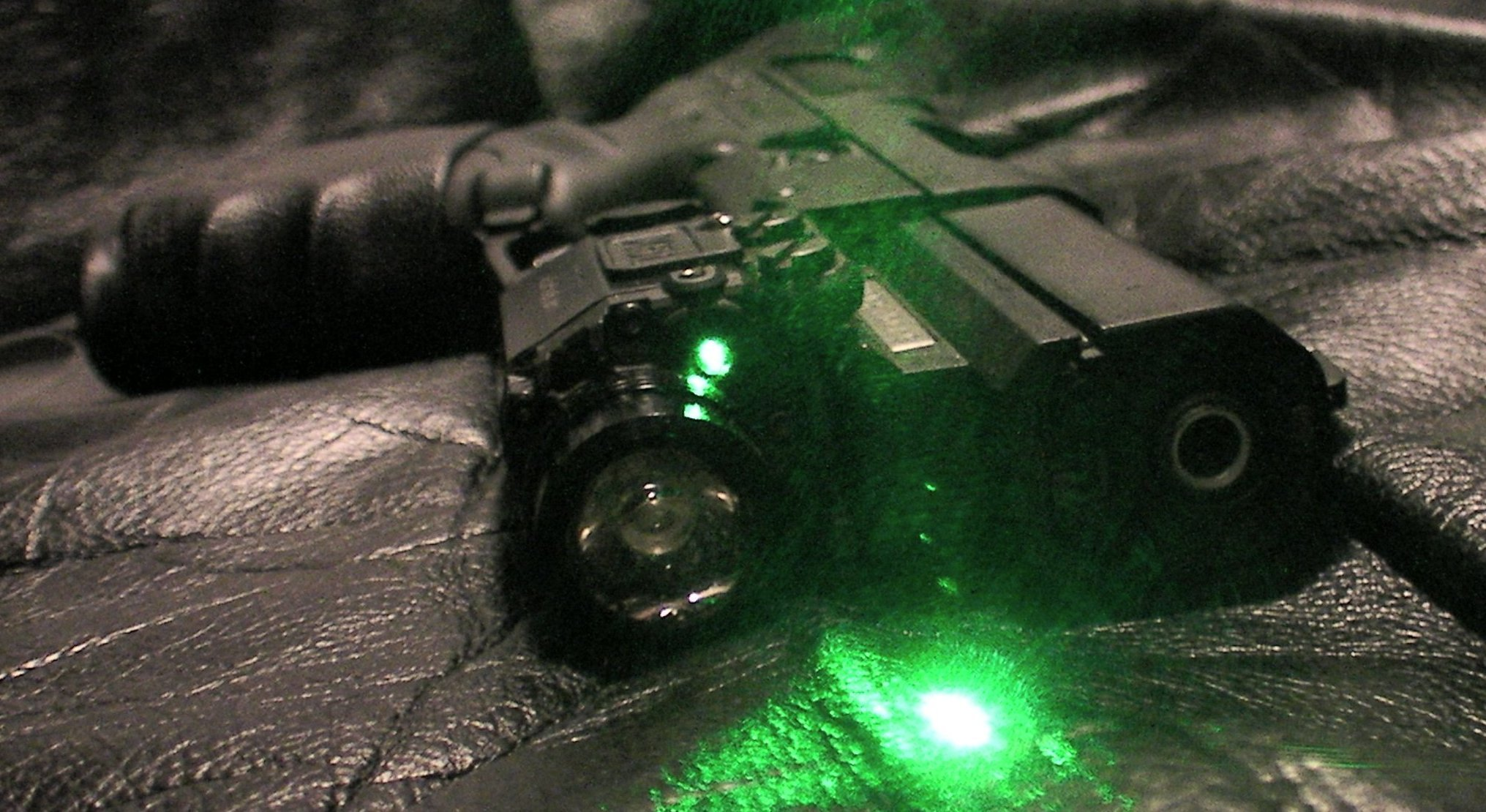
FN Five-seven USG pistol equipped with a Viridian X5L (Gen. 2) light/laser combo

Five-seven USG
The Five-seven USG (United States Government) model was approved by the ATF as a sporting firearm in 2004, replacing the IOM model. The USG retained the changes that were incorporated in the IOM, but it had further modifications, including a conventionally shaped square trigger guard, a tightly checkered grip pattern, and a larger, reversible magazine release. It was originally offered with adjustable sights, but starting in 2009 it was also offered with low profile fixed sights. The USG model had a black frame finish with grey controls as standard, but it was also offered in limited quantities with black controls. Since 2013, the USG model is no longer listed by FNH USA.

Five-seven FDE
The Five-seven FDE (Flat Dark Earth) model was built to the same specifications as the Five-seven USG, but it had a brown frame finish and black controls, as opposed to the standard black frame finish and grey controls of the Five-seven USG. Like the USG model, the FDE was offered with either adjustable sights or low profile fixed sights. Since 2013, the original FDE model is no longer listed by FNH USA, although a flat dark earth version of the new MK2 is available.

Five-seven ODG
The Five-seven ODG (Olive Drab Green) model was built to the same specifications as the Five-seven USG model, but it had an olive drab frame finish and black controls, as opposed to the standard black frame finish and grey controls of the Five-seven USG. Like the USG model, the ODG model was offered with either adjustable sights or low profile fixed sights. Since 2012, the ODG model is no longer listed by FNH USA.

Five-seven MK2
The Five-seven MK2 model was introduced in 2013. This new model has cocking serrations on the front of the slide, and has a one-piece metal slide (under the polymer cover), whereas the previous models have a two-piece welded metal slide. It is available only with adjustable sights. The rear sight on the adjustable-sight version has also been changed, with beefed-up construction and white straight-edge sight references compared to the present three-dot target-style sights; these have been described as "combat adjustable sights".

The MK2 has a black frame and slide, with flat black controls in place of the grey controls of the IOM and USG models. It is also available with a flat dark earth frame color. It is slightly wider than previous models and will not fit most custom holsters made for earlier versions of the Five-seven.

=== Current model ===
Five-seven MK3 MRD
The Five-seven MK3 MRD model was introduced in 2022, the main difference is the new FN patented interface that accepts the most commonly used red dot sights, and multisurfaced textures. Optically it has a new slide and a more textured grip, compared to the MK2. It is available in black and flat dark earth.

== Controversies ==
The Five-seven pistol and 5.7×28mm ammunition were originally restricted by FN to military and law enforcement customers, but in 2004 the new Five-seven IOM model was introduced, and offered to civilian shooters for use with 5.7×28mm SS192 ammunition. FNH USA has marketed the Five-seven to civilian shooters as a pistol suitable for personal protection, target shooting, and similar uses, but the Five-seven's introduction to civilian shooters was strongly opposed by U.S. gun control organizations such as the Brady Campaign; by the end of 2004, sales of the Five-seven pistol had increased dramatically.

In early 2005, the pistol was subject to controversy in the United States after the Brady Campaign stated that commercially available 5.7×28mm SS192 ammunition penetrated a Level IIA Kevlar vest in testing. The National Rifle Association of America (NRA) shortly countered the Brady Campaign's claim by stating that the gun control group may not have adhered to standard testing procedures, and that FN offers armor-piercing varieties of the 5.7×28mm cartridge only to military and law enforcement customers. Varieties offered to civilians are classified by the U.S. Bureau of Alcohol, Tobacco, Firearms and Explosives (ATF) as not armor-piercing, and it was stated that the SS192 and SS196 cartridge variations were unable to penetrate various types of Kevlar vests in tests conducted by FNH USA.

The Five-seveN has been loved and hated in the years since its introduction. It is one of the most controversial handguns of our time, and was so even before the Fort Hood atrocity.

— Massad Ayoob, On Target magazine

Michael D. Barnes, then-president of the Brady Campaign, responded to the NRA's statements on the Five-seven by challenging NRA Executive Vice President Wayne LaPierre to be shot with the pistol while wearing a Kevlar vest. The NRA again responded to the Brady Campaign's statements, saying that "Barnes demonstrated his group's complete and utter disregard for gun safety and its flaming zeal to further restrict the rights of law-abiding gun owners." In the same year, two pieces of legislation were introduced in the United States Congress, specifically targeting the Five-seven pistol and 5.7×28mm ammunition for a federal ban: the H.R. 1136: PLEA Act was introduced in the House of Representatives by Rep. Eliot Engel (D-NY), and the S. 527: PLEA Act was introduced in the Senate by Sen. Frank Lautenberg (D-NJ); neither bill proceeded to a vote by the House or Senate.

In March 2007, legislation was again introduced in the United States Congress by Rep. Engel, under the new designation H.R. 1784: PLEA Act. Once again, the bill failed to proceed to a vote. In the following years, the Five-seven was subject to further controversy due to reports of the pistol's use by drug cartels in the Mexican drug war. In the United States, the Five-seven has been used once to shoot and kill a police officer, causing the line of duty death of Wisconsin State Patrol Trooper Trevor Casper. Various news sources such as The Boston Globe and La Jornada also report incidents in which the pistol was used to shoot and kill police officers or civilians in Mexico. According to the ATF, the Five-seven is one of the weapons favored by drug cartels in the Mexican drug war, and a smuggled Five-seven pistol can sell for up to 66,000 pesos (US$5,000) in Mexico. From Mexico, the pistols have been smuggled into other South American countries; in a July 2010 drive-by shooting in Envigado, Colombia, two cartel gunmen armed with Five-seven pistols opened fire on a group of bystanders outside a nightclub, leaving 9 people dead and 10 wounded.

In November 2009, the Five-seven again became subject to controversy in the United States, following the shooting at Fort Hood military base, in Texas. A U.S. Army psychiatrist, Major Nidal Hasan, opened fire on fellow soldiers with a Five-seven pistol, killing 13 people and wounding 29 in the worst shooting ever to take place on an American military base. Shortly after the shooting, FNH USA responded with a fact sheet dismissing allegations about the nature of the pistol, stating that it is only offered to civilians with sporting ammunition. Later in the month, a number of gun control organizations such as the Brady Campaign wrote a collaborative letter to U.S. President Barack Obama, citing the weapon's use by the Fort Hood shooter and Mexican drug cartels, and calling on him to ban importation of the Five-seven pistol and 5.7×28mm ammunition. In July 2010, legislation was introduced in the United States Congress by Rep. Engel, for a third time, under the new designation H.R. 6030: PLEA Act. Like its previous incarnations, the H.R. 6030 bill failed to proceed to a vote by either the House of Representatives or Senate.

== Users ==
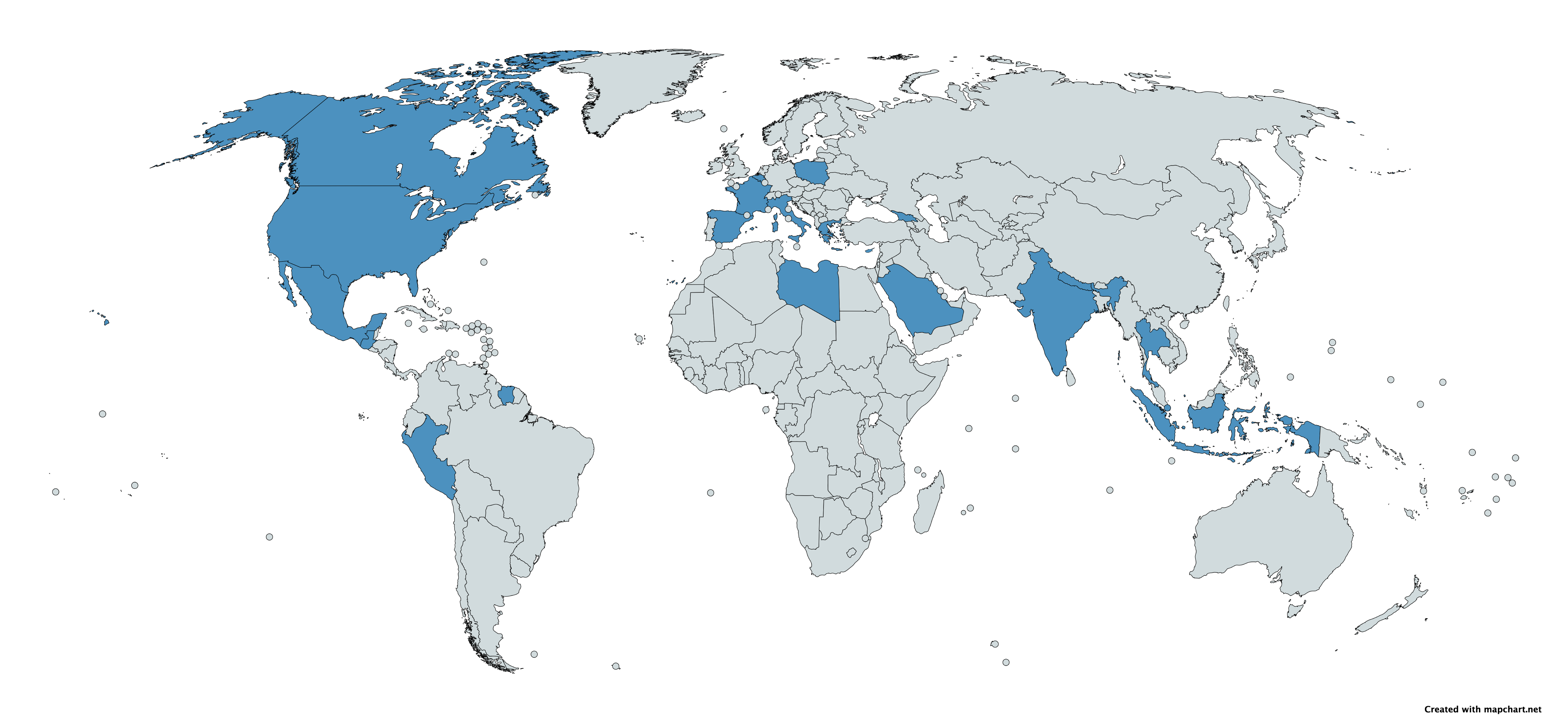
A map with Five-seven users in blue

The first military organization to adopt the Five-seven was the Cypriot National Guard (Greek: Εθνική Φρουρά), which purchased 250 pistols in May 2000 for its special forces group. By 2009, the Five-seven was in service with military and police forces in over 40 nations throughout the world.

In the United States, the Five-seven (as of 2010) is used by over 300 law enforcement agencies, including the U.S. Secret Service. Military and law enforcement organizations using the Five-seven include:

Country	Organization	Model	Quantity	Date	Reference
Belgium	Composante Air (Belgian Air Force) pilots	−	−	−	
Belgium	Composante Terre (Belgian Army), replacing the Browning Hi-Power pistol	Mk2	−	2013–	
Belgium	Directorate of Special Units (DSU) group of the Federale Politie/Police Fédérale	−	−	−	
Belgium	Special Forces Group (SFG)	−	−	−	
Belgium	Liège metropolitan police force	−	−	−	
Canada	Service de police de la Ville de Montréal (SPVM) in Montreal, Quebec	−	−	−	
Cyprus	Εθνική Φρουρά (Cypriot National Guard) special forces	Five-seven	250	2000–	
France	Direction Générale de la Sécurité Extérieure (DGSE) intelligence agency	−	−	−	
France	GIGN counter-terrorist unit of the Gendarmerie Nationale	−	−	−	
France	Recherche Assistance Intervention Dissuasion (RAID) unit of the Police Nationale	−	−	−	
Georgia	Georgian army	−	−	−	
Georgia	Ministry of Internal Affairs	−	−	−	
Greece	Ειδική Κατασταλτική Αντιτρομοκρατική Μονάδα (EKAM) unit of the Hellenic Police	−	−	−	
Guatemala	Dirección General de Inteligencia Civil (DIGICI) intelligence agency	USG	−	2008–	
India	Special Protection Group (SPG) assigned to the prime minister and other officials	USG	−	2008–	
Indonesia	Komando Pasukan Katak (Kopaska) tactical diver group of the Indonesian Navy	−	−	−	
Indonesia	Komando Pasukan Khusus (Kopassus) special forces group of the Indonesian Army	−	−	−	
Italy	Col Moschin 9º Reggimento d'Assalto Paracadutisti (9th Parachute Assault Regiment) special forces of the Italian Army	USG	−	−	
Libya	Military of Libya (used by Muammar Gaddafi's military forces in the 2011 Libyan civil war, and some of these examples were captured and used in the war by Libyan rebel forces)	USG	367	2008–	
Mexico	Ejército Méxicano (Mexican Army)	−	−	−	
Mexico	Estado Mayor Presidencial (EMP; Presidential Guard)	−	−	−	
Mexico	Fuerzas Especiales (FES; Special Forces) of the Mexican Navy	−	−	−	
Nepal	Nepalese Armed Forces	−	−	−	
Pakistan	Special Service Group	−	−	−	
Pakistan	Special Services Wing	−	−	−	
Peru	Grupo de Fuerzas Especiales (GRUFE) of the Peruvian Armed Forces	USG	−	2009–	
Poland	Centralne Biuro Śledcze (CBŚ; Central Bureau of Investigation)	−	−	−	
Poland	Grupa Reagowania Operacyjno-Manewrowego (GROM) special forces (used primarily for dignitary protection)	USG	−	2007–	
Saudi Arabia	Armed Forces of Saudi Arabia	USG	12,000	2007–	
Singapore	Singapore Armed Forces Commando Formation (CDO FN)	Five-seven Tactical	500	−	
Spain	Fuerzas Armadas Españolas (Spanish Armed Forces)	−	−	−	
Spain	Pozuelo de Alarcón (Madrid) municipal police force	−	−	−	
Suriname	Security forces	−	−	−	
Thailand	กองทัพบกไทย (Royal Thai Army)	−	−	−	
United States	United States Secret Service	−	−	−	
United States	Duluth, Georgia police department	−	−	−	
United States	Passaic County, New Jersey sheriff's department SWAT	−	−	2002–	
United States	Landis, North Carolina police department	USG & Mk2	5	2011–	

== See also ==
- FK BRNO Field Pistol – Modern Czech pistol chambered for bottlenecked, high velocity 7.5 FK ammunition.
- Fort mod. 28 – Semi-automatic Ukrainian pistol chambered for the 5.7×28mm cartridge
- Heckler & Koch UCP – Competing 4.6×30mm PDW-caliber pistol project briefly developed by Heckler & Koch in Germany.
- KelTec P50 – Semi-automatic American pistol chambered for the 5.7×28mm cartridge
- Kel-Tec PR57 – Semi-automatic American pistol chambered for the 5.7×28mm cartridge
- PSA 5.7 Rock – Semi-automatic American pistol chambered for the 5.7×28mm cartridge
- Ruger-5.7 – Semi-automatic American pistol chambered for the 5.7×28mm cartridge
- Smith & Wesson M&P 5.7 – Semi-automatic American pistol chambered for the 5.7×28mm cartridge
- Tisas PX-5.7 – Semi-automatic Turkish pistol chambered for the 5.7×28mm cartridge
