= Palmetto State Armory =

American firearms company

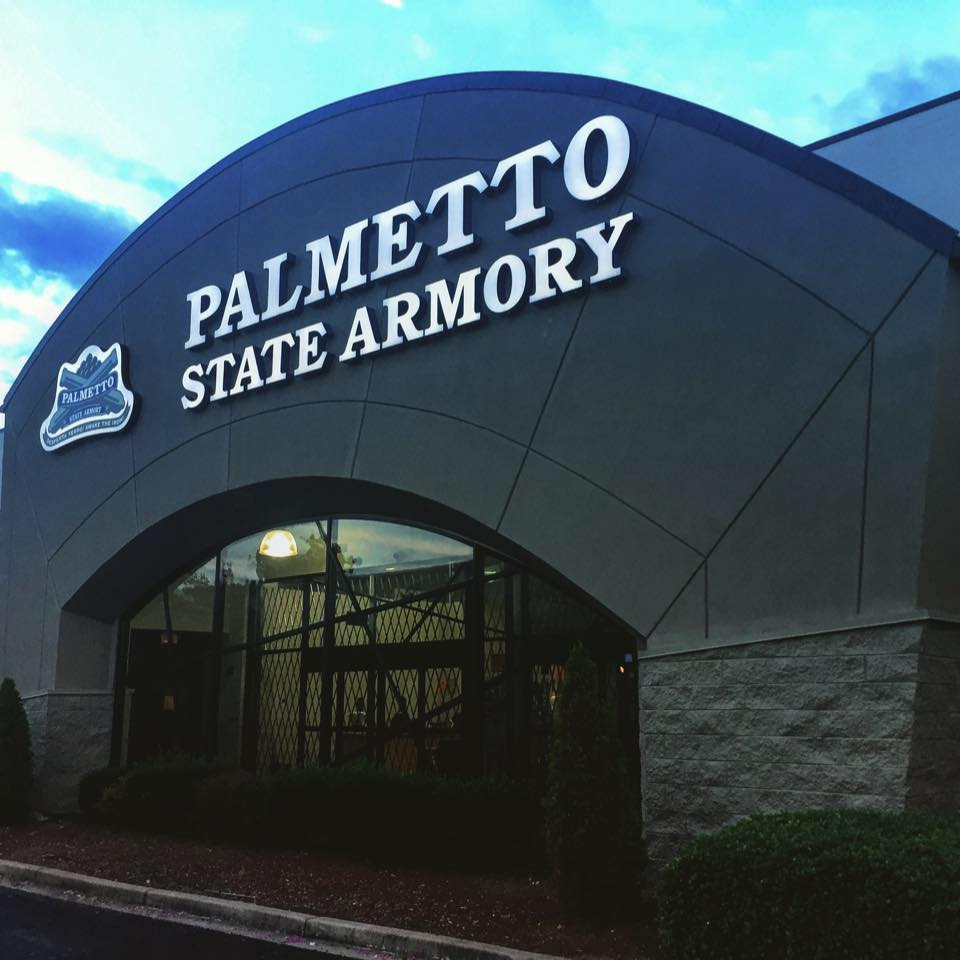
- Palmetto State Armory retail store in Greenville, South Carolina
- Industry: Arms industry
- Founded: 2008; 18 years ago
- Founder: Jamin McCallum
- Headquarters: Columbia, South Carolina
- Products: Firearms
- Parent: JJE Capital family of brands
- Website: palmettostatearmory.com

Palmetto State Armory is an American firearms company based in Columbia, South Carolina. The name is derived from South Carolina's official nickname, "The Palmetto State". Palmetto State Armory operates several retail locations around the states of South Carolina, Georgia and North Carolina.

== History ==
Jamin McCallum established Palmetto State Armory in 2008 after leaving a career in accounting.

Palmetto State Armory began with Jamin selling surplus magazines and ammunition online by fulfilling orders out of his home's garage. Shortly thereafter, Palmetto State Armory began producing its own firearms and firearm components. PSA, through acquisition, now produces AAC ammunition and suppressors as well as their own branded line of pistols, rifles, and shotguns,. As of 2026 the company employs more than 2000 people across multiple states and is continuing to grow, with former South Carolina Governor Nikki Haley calling it, "a valued member of South Carolina's thriving business community."

As of 2026 Palmetto State Armory is one of the two largest (non-auction) direct retailer online gun dealers, in the United States, typically listing over 5,600 firearms for sale at any given time.

== Company ==
=== Product line ===
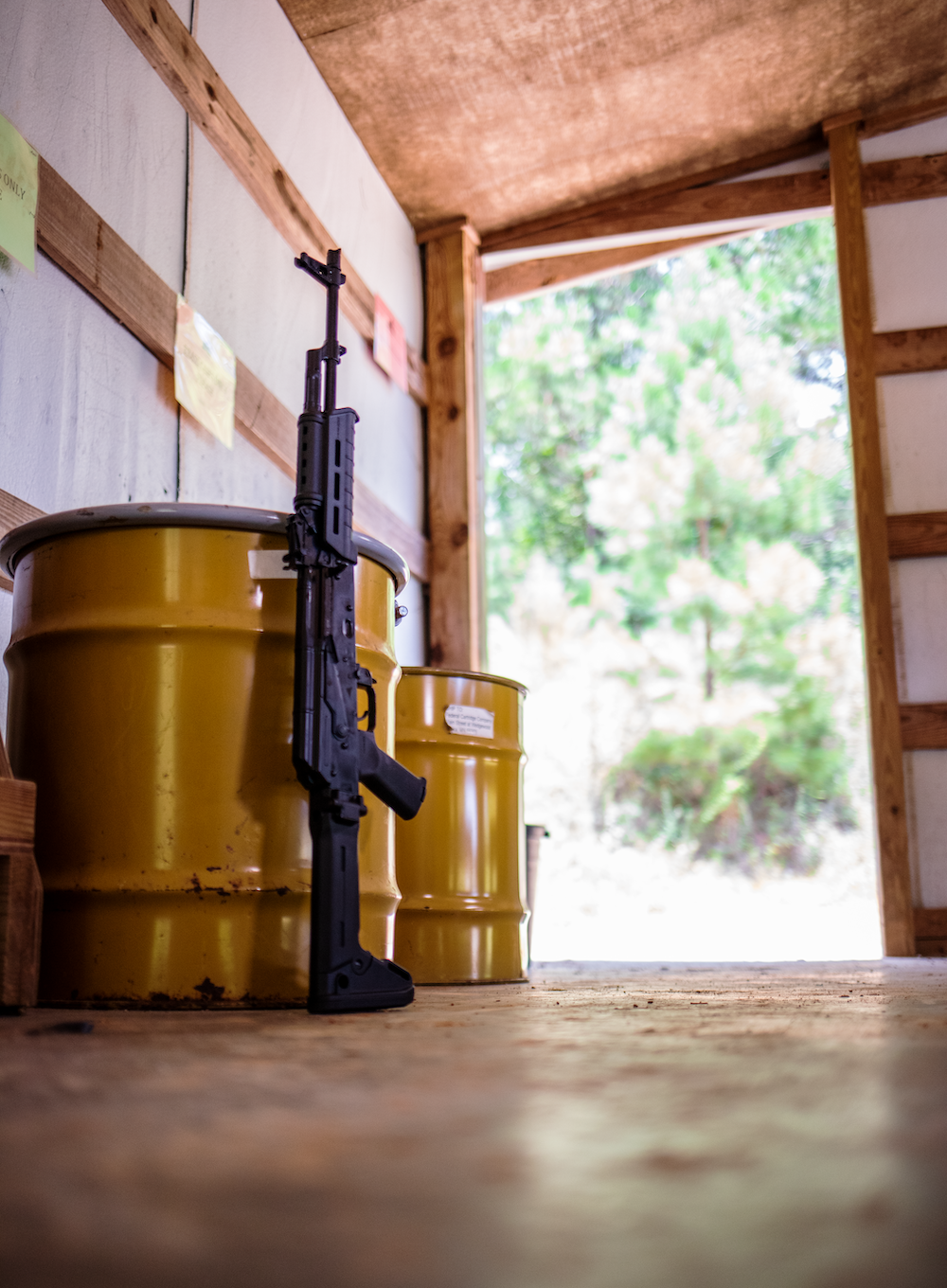
PSA AK-E

Palmetto State Armory is known for its line of AR-15 rifles and pistols, though, in the last several years Palmetto State Armory's line has expanded to include AKM style rifles. In 2019, Palmetto State Armory entered into an exclusive contract with FN America to source the world's only FN AK barrel in the Palmetto State Armory AK-E (enhanced) rifle. The use of the FN made AK barrel has since expanded to include other variations of the PSA AK lineup. PSA also sources FN cold hammer forged barrels for the AR-15.

PSA has now begun offering the AK-103, AK-104 and the AK-105, based on the modernized AK-100 family.

Palmetto State Armory also produces a line of 1911 handguns, AR-10 rifles, 9mm AR-style pistols and various AR style rifled-uppers ranging in caliber and cartridge dimensions from .22 Long Rifle to .308 Win/7.62x51 NATO.

Their latest offering, is the PSA Dagger pistol chambered in 9mm, which is based on the 3rd generation Glock G19. The Dagger is also available in a hybrid G19x/G45 configuration, using the 3rd generation form factor. The Dagger provides nearly full parts compatibility with the Glock generation 3, except for a unique front locking block-rail assembly and the rear rail assembly. Where the Glock rails are not serviceable, the Daggers unique design allows for servicing and replacement of the rail assemblies. Dagger barrels, trigger mechanisms, slides, magazines, and most other maintenance parts are fully interchangeable with their Glock counterparts. PSA also offers the 5.7x28mm pistol 5.7 Rock.

=== Retail locations ===
Palmetto State Armory has twelve retail stores located in South Carolina, Georgia, and North Carolina. It also has an outdoor shooting facility located in Swansea, South Carolina. A Myrtle Beach location, in the former Sun News building, opened in 2023, and a Florence, SC location opened in 2026.

== JJE Capital ==
Palmetto State Armory is a member of the JJE Capital family of brands. They also manage a number of different brands including, DC Machine, Ferrous Engineering, Lead Star Arms, PSA Defense, Palmetto Outdoors, Special Tool Solutions, and Spartan Forge. In September 2020 JJE Capital also acquired DPMS, H&R, Stormlake, AAC and Parker brands from the Freedom Group bankruptcy auction.
