= KelTec P50 =

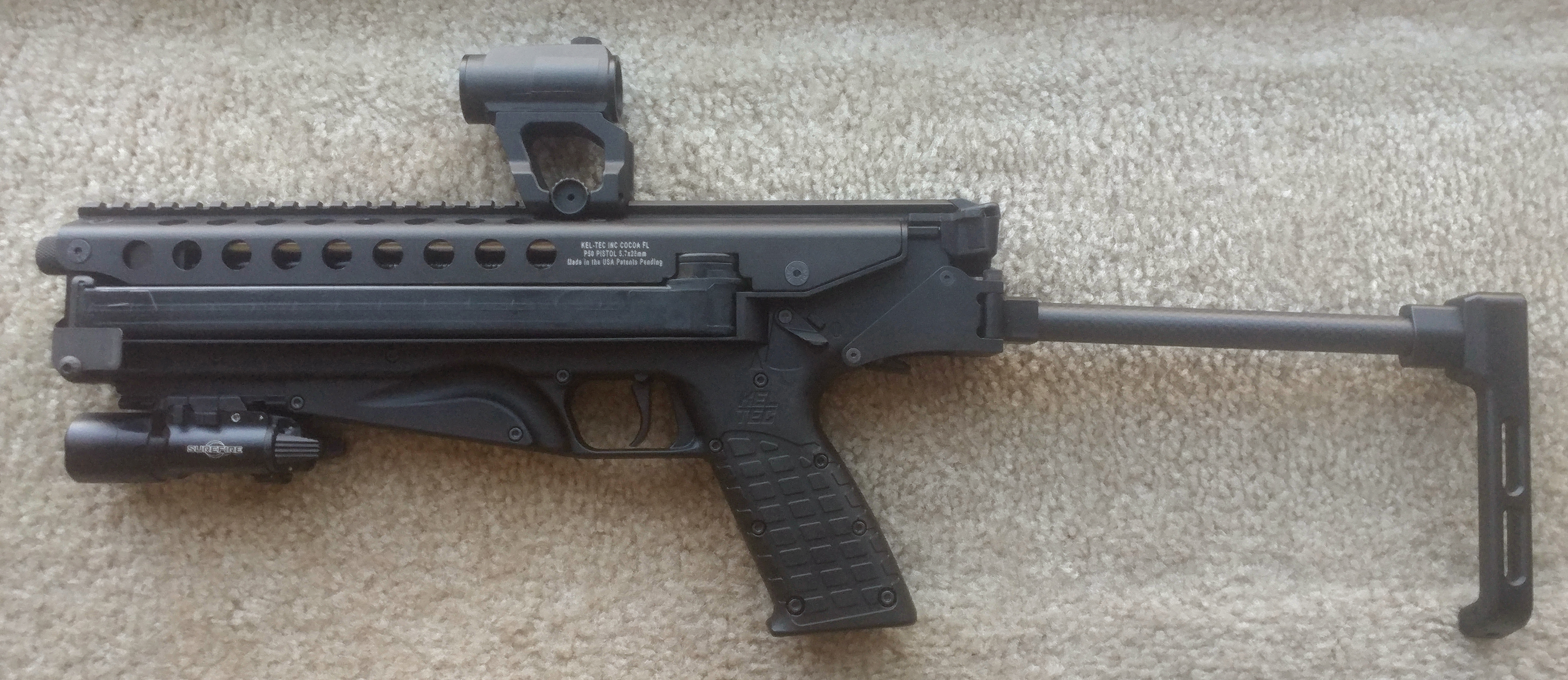
- Kel-Tec P50 with carbon fiber brace, red dot sight, and flashlight
- Type: Semi-automatic pistol
- Place of origin: United States

Production history
- Designed: 2021
- Manufacturer: KelTec
- Unit cost: $795

Specifications
- Mass: 3.2 lbs (1.43 kg)
- Length: 15 in (380 mm)
- Barrel length: 9.6 in (244 mm)
- Width: 2 in (50 mm)
- Height: 6.7 in (170 mm)
- Cartridge: 5.7×28mm
- Action: Straight blowback
- Feed system: 50-round FN P90 magazine

The KelTec P50 is a 5.7×28mm semi-automatic pistol designed in the United States by KelTec in 2021.

== History ==
In December 2020, an image of a magazine cover showcasing the P50 was leaked on KTOG, an online forum dedicated to KelTec.

The image advertised the pistol's ability to feed from 50 round 5.7×28mm magazines, and it is described as the "most unique KelTec yet".

The image subsequently spread to the rest of the Internet, which coincided with a trademark of the name P50, registered by KelTec in February 2020.

In January 2021, KelTec's official website revealed details about the P50, saying that the weapon was going to begin shipping in March 2021, with an MSRP of $995.

== Design ==
The P50 is a straight blowback semi-automatic pistol that feeds from FN P90 magazines.

Like the P90, the rounds are rotated at a 90-degree angle from the magazine into the chamber. A Picatinny rail is located on the upper receiver, and a second rail is located below the magazine. The trigger pull is 5 lb (22N). The barrel and moving parts are made from steel, with a polymer frame and lower receiver to reduce weight.

The P50 has an unusually long barrel for a handgun, helping to improve its muzzle velocity. At nine inches, it is over double the length of the barrel of the FN Five-seven, and only one inch less than the P90's barrel.

KelTec has stated that they have no intention of creating any braces or other accessories for the P50, leaving the aftermarket to "do their thing".

At 50 yards (45,72 m), the P50 has an average shot grouping of 1.5 inches (38 mm). The bolt is longer than that of an average handgun, which helps reduce recoil, making the P50 "significantly more accurate than 9mm machine pistols or their semiauto lookalikes".

With a sling attached, the P50 can consistently make accurate shots from ranges up to 100 yards (91 m).

== Variants ==
=== R50 ===
In 2023, KelTec designed a rifle variant named the R50, with an added stock and longer barrel, making for a total length of 30.5 inches (770 mm).

=== R50 Defender ===
Regular R50 with the barrel length of a P50.

=== KP-50 ===
In 2026, KelTec introduced the KP-50, an evolution of the P-50, it features a bottom mounted magazine well, removing the hinged sistem of the P-50 and allowed the use of jungle clips. Featuring a milled steel receiver, the KP-50 comes in a standard, braced and stocked configuration.

=== MP-50 ===
The MP-50 is a select-fire variant of the KP-50, possessing a cyclic-rate of 850 rpm, intended for use by law-enforcement and military.

== Reception ==
Shooting Illustrated called the P50 "rather bulky for a handgun" but noted that this increase in size gave it better velocity and magazine capacity than other handguns and that it could be used in home defense as a more compact alternative to a shotgun or rifle. They called the trigger "outstanding", and noted its light recoil, and said that the P50 was a "serious competitor" to other 5.7×28mm designs such as the FN Five-seven and Ruger-5.7.

The National Interest praised the low recoil, customization options from the various rails, and the "one of a kind" top-break access, describing it as "unique, buzzworthy, and the all-around coolest new gun of 2021."

Outdoor Life called the P50 "a cross between a space gun and a bullet hose" and named it as one of the best guns of the year.
