= Ruger-5.7 =

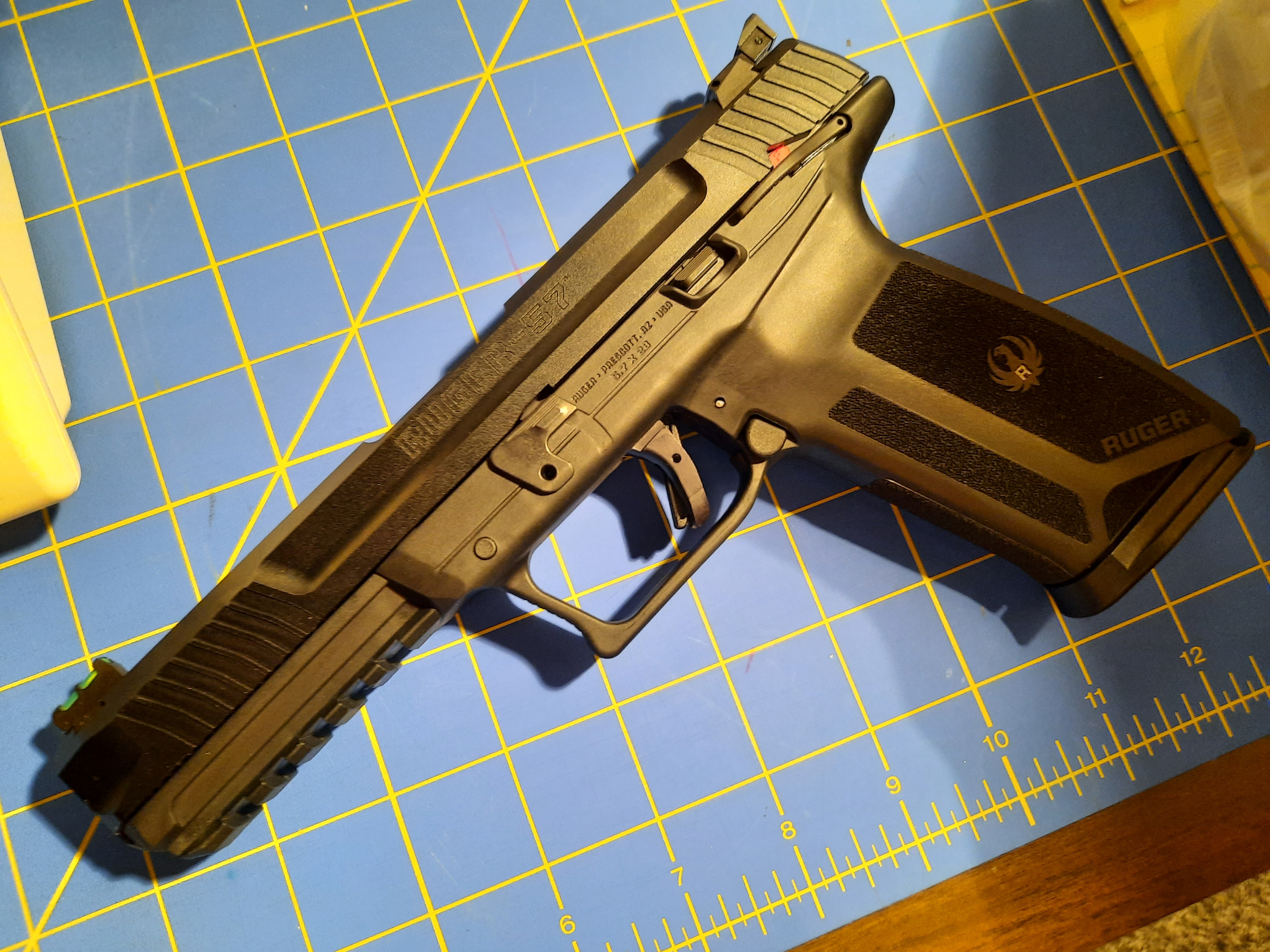
- Type: Semi-automatic pistol
- Place of origin: United States

Production history
- Designed: 2019
- Manufacturer: Sturm, Ruger & Co.
- Unit cost: US$799.00 (MSRP)
- Produced: 2019–present

Specifications
- Mass: 24.5 oz (690 g)
- Length: 8.65 in (220 mm)
- Barrel length: 4.94 in (125 mm)
- Width: 1.20 in (30 mm) (slide)
- Height: 5.60 in (142 mm)
- Cartridge: 5.7×28mm
- Action: Delayed blowback
- Muzzle velocity: 520 m/s (1,700 ft/s)
- Effective firing range: 123 m (135 yd)
- Feed system: 10- or 20-round box magazine
- Sights: Adjustable rear sight and fiber optic front sight

The Ruger-5.7 is a semi-automatic pistol introduced in December 2019 by Sturm, Ruger & Co. It is the first traditionally-styled semi-automatic pistol to be chambered for the 5.7×28mm cartridge since the introduction of the Excel Arms MP-57 in 2012.

== Overview ==
The Ruger-5.7 was introduced in December 2019 to be a more affordable alternative 5.7x28mm semi-automatic pistol compared to the FN Five-seven pistol (which had been the only other 5.7x28 pistol available to the civilian market for over 20 years). Since 2020, several different pistol designs from several different firearms manufacturers came into the market that expanded the 5.7x28mm’s growing popularity, including the PSA 5.7 Rock in January 2022, the S&W M&P 5.7 in January 2023, the TİSAŞ PX-5.7 in January 2024 and the Kel-Tec PR57 in January 2025.

== See also ==
- List of delayed-blowback firearms

=== Similar firearms ===
- FN Five-seven
- PSA 5.7 Rock
- Kel-Tec P50
- Smith & Wesson M&P 5.7
- TİSAŞ PX-5.7
- Kel-Tec PR57
