= FN 5.7×28mm =

Handgun cartridge developed by FN Herstal

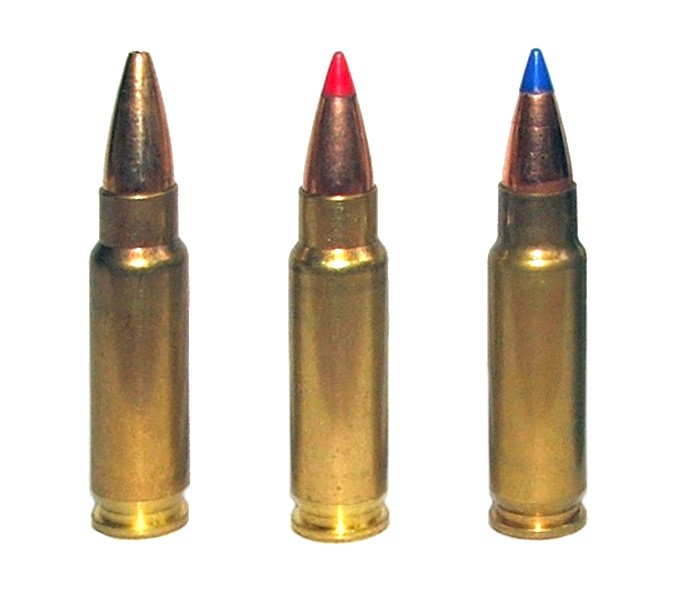
- 5.7×28mm sporting cartridges. From left to right: SS195LF, SS196SR, and SS197SR.
- Type: Pistol, personal defense weapon
- Place of origin: Belgium

Service history
- In service: 1990–present
- Used by: 40+ nations; see: P90 Users; Five-seven Users
- Wars: War in Afghanistan; Iraq War; Mexican drug war; Libyan civil war (2011)

Production history
- Designer: Jean-Paul Denis (SS90); Marc Neuforge (SS90)
- Designed: 1986–1990 (SS90); 1987–1993 (SS190)
- Manufacturer: FN Herstal
- Produced: 1987–1993 (SS90); 1989–present (SS190)
- Variants: See Varieties

Specifications
- Case type: Rebated, bottleneck
- Bullet diameter: 5.70 mm (0.224 in)
- Land diameter: 5.53 mm (0.218 in)
- Neck diameter: 6.38 mm (0.251 in)
- Shoulder diameter: 7.95 mm (0.313 in)
- Base diameter: 7.95 mm (0.313 in)
- Rim diameter: 7.80 mm (0.307 in)
- Rim thickness: 1.14 mm (0.045 in)
- Case length: 28.90 mm (1.138 in)
- Overall length: 40.50 mm (1.594 in)
- Case capacity: 0.90 cm^{3} (13.9 gr H_{2}O)
- Rifling twist: 228.6 mm (9.00 in)
- Primer type: Boxer Small Rifle
- Maximum pressure: 345.00 MPa (50,038 psi)

Ballistic performance
Bullet mass/type	Velocity	Energy
31 gr (2.0 g) SS190 AP FMJ	716 m/s (2,350 ft/s)	515 J (380 ft⋅lbf)
27 gr (1.7 g) SS195LF HP	576 m/s (1,890 ft/s)	290 J (210 ft⋅lbf)
40 gr (2.6 g) SS197SR V-Max	529 m/s (1,740 ft/s)	363 J (268 ft⋅lbf)
40 gr (2.6 g) Speer Gold Dot JHP	548 m/s (1,800 ft/s)	389 J (287 ft⋅lbf)
40 gr (2.6 g) Hornady Critical Defense FTX	551 m/s (1,810 ft/s)	393 J (290 ft⋅lbf)
- Test barrel length: 122 mm (4.8 in), 264 mm (10.4 in) for SS190.

The FN 5.7×28mm (designated as the 5.7×28 by the C.I.P. and 5.7×28mm NATO) is a small-caliber, high-velocity, smokeless-powder, rebated, non-tapered, bottleneck, centerfire cartridge designed for pistols and personal defense weapons (PDW) uses, manufactured by FN Herstal. It is similar in length to the .22 Winchester Magnum Rimfire (.22 WMR) and .22 Hornet. Unlike many new cartridges, it has no parent case; the complete package was developed from scratch by FN.

The 5.7×28mm was developed in conjunction with the FN P90 PDW and later the FN Five-seven pistol in response to NATO requests as a replacement for the 9×19mm Parabellum cartridge. In 2002 and 2003, NATO conducted a series of tests to find a replacement. The tests compared the relative merits of the 5.7×28mm cartridge and the 4.6×30mm cartridge, which was created by Heckler & Koch as a competitor to the 5.7×28mm. The NATO group subsequently recommended the 5.7×28mm cartridge, citing superior performance in testing, but the German delegation objected and the standardization process was halted until 2021 when it was officially adopted as a NATO standard Standardization Agreement (STANAG) 4509.

By 2006, FN's 5.7×28mm firearms — the P90 PDW and Five-seven pistol — were in service with military and police forces in over 40 nations throughout the world. In the United States, 5.7×28mm firearms are currently used by numerous law enforcement agencies, including the United States Secret Service.

In addition to being used in the FN P90 and FN Five-seven firearms, the 5.7×28mm cartridge has subsequently been used in a number of other weapons, such as the AR-57 and FN PS90 carbines. Excel Arms has developed four firearms chambered in 5.7×28mm, MasterPiece Arms offers three different firearms in 5.7×28mm., and CMMG offers several of its AR-Style Banshee firearms in 5.7x28. RPC Fort introduced the Fort-28 in 2015.

As of December 2019, Sturm, Ruger & Co. offers its Ruger-5.7 semi-automatic pistol chambered in this cartridge. January 2021 saw the announcement by KelTec of the P50 handgun, which uses 50 round P90 magazines. Palmetto State Armory introduced its Rock 5.7 pistol in January 2022; it became available for purchase in May 2022. In January 2023, Smith & Wesson introduced the M&P 5.7 gas-assisted pistol. In January 2024, TİSAŞ introduced the PX-5.7, the first Turkish-made 5.7x28 pistol. In 2025 Kel-Tec announced the PR57, a top loading rotary barrel pistol.

The 5.7×28mm cartridge is produced in a number of varieties, two of which — the SS195LF and SS197SR — are currently offered by FN to civilian shooters.

== History ==
=== Development ===
The 5.7×28mm cartridge was designed in response to NATO requests for a replacement for the 9×19mm Parabellum cartridge. According to the NATO requirement, the new cartridge was to have greater range, accuracy, and terminal performance than the 9×19mm cartridge. Additionally, it was to be capable of penetrating body armor. FN Herstal responded to the NATO requirement by developing the 5.7×28mm cartridge and two associated weapons: the FN P90 personal defense weapon (PDW) and FN Five-seven pistol.

The original 5.7×28mm cartridge, called the SS90, was introduced in 1990. It used a 1.5 g (23 gr) plastic-core projectile, which was propelled at a muzzle velocity of roughly 850 m/s (2,800 ft/s; Mach 2.5) when fired from the P90. A United States patent application for the projectile design used in the SS90 was filed by FN's Jean-Paul Denis and Marc Neuforge in 1989. U.S. Patent 5,012,743 ("High-Performance Projectile") was received in 1991.

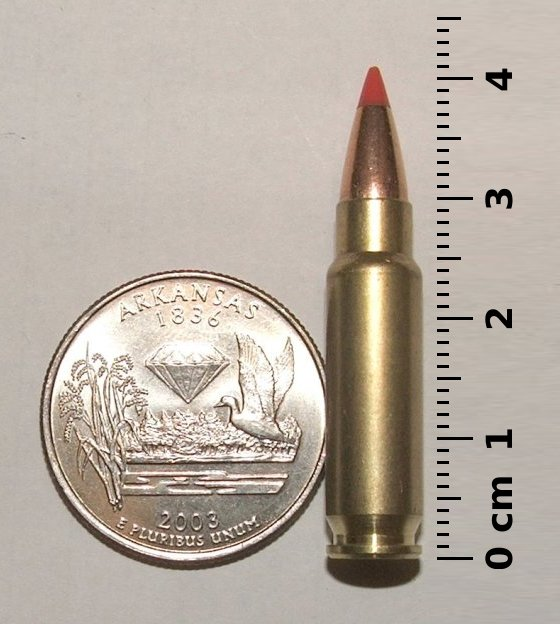
5.7×28mm SS196SR next to a U.S. quarter-dollar coin and a ruler

The 5.7×28mm SS90 cartridge was discontinued, and replaced, in 1993, with the 5.7×28mm SS190. The SS190 uses a 2.7 mm (0.11 in) shorter projectile with a mass of 2.0 g (31 gr), which has, when fired from the P90, a muzzle velocity of roughly 716 m/s (2,350 ft/s; Mach 2.1). The shorter length of the SS190 projectile allows it to be more conveniently used in the 5.7×28mm FN Five-seven pistol, which was also being developed at that time.

In 1993, FN introduced a modified version of the P90 with a magazine adapted to use the SS190 cartridge. Several specialized 5.7×28mm varieties were also developed alongside the SS190, such as the L191 tracer round and the subsonic SB193 bullet for sound-suppressed use. The 5.7×28mm chambered FN Five-seven pistol then went into production in 1998.

=== NATO evaluation ===
In 2002 and 2003, NATO conducted a series of tests with the intention of standardizing a PDW cartridge as a replacement for the 9×19mm Parabellum. The tests compared the relative merits of the 5.7×28mm cartridge and the HK 4.6×30mm cartridge, which was created by German small arms manufacturer Heckler & Koch as a competitor to the 5.7×28mm. The results of the NATO tests were analyzed by a group formed of experts from Canada, France, the United Kingdom, and the United States. The group's conclusion was that the 5.7×28mm was statistically the more efficient cartridge.

Among other points, the NATO group cited superior effectiveness (27 percent greater) for the 5.7×28mm against unprotected targets and equal effectiveness against protected targets. It also cited less sensitivity to extreme temperatures for the 5.7×28mm, and cited a greater potential risk of barrel erosion with the 4.6×30mm. In addition, the group pointed out that 5.7×28mm is close to the 5.56×45mm NATO by its design and manufacture process, allowing it to be manufactured on existing production lines. The group also noted that 5.7×28mm firearms had existed for a longer period of time than 4.6×30mm firearms, and that the 5.7×28mm FN Five-seven pistol was already in production at that time, while the 4.6×30mm Heckler & Koch UCP pistol was a new concept.

However, NATO countries could not reach the general consensus to standardized 5.7×28mm, which halted the standardization process indefinitely. As a result, both the 4.6×30mm and 5.7×28mm cartridges (and the associated weapons) have instead been independently adopted by various NATO countries, according to preference; both the P90 and Five-seven are currently in service with some military and police force units in over 40 nations throughout the world.

=== Present ===
In 2004, the SS192 hollow-point cartridge was introduced to civilian shooters alongside the new IOM variant of the Five-seven pistol. After being met with controversy regarding its alleged armour-piercing abilities, the SS192 variety was discontinued in the same year, and in 2005 the SS196SR variety was introduced using a 2.6 g (40 grain) Hornady V-Max projectile. The SS196 was also quickly discontinued in favor of the newer SS195LF and SS197SR varieties, which are currently offered to civilian shooters for use in 5.7×28mm firearms, followed by the SS198LF variety, which is currently produced but is restricted by FN to military and law enforcement customers.

FN's 5.7×28mm ammunition types were briefly manufactured by Olin-Winchester, but today they are made by FN Herstal in Belgium and (since 2006) Fiocchi in the United States. In 2009, the National Rifle Association of America added 5.7×28mm firearms to its NRA Tactical Police Competition standards, allowing law enforcement agencies to compete in this event using 5.7×28mm firearms. Starting in 2012, Federal began producing a new 5.7×28mm round for civilian shooters, designated the AE5728A.

On February 25, 2021, FN Herstal announced that 5.7×28mm caliber was recently recognized as a NATO caliber with the NATO STANAG 4509.

== Design details ==
The 5.7×28mm cartridge was designed by FN Herstal specifically for use in the FN P90 personal defense weapon and FN Five-seven pistol. Subsequently, it has been used in a number of other weapons, such as the FN PS90 carbine and the AR-57, an upper receiver for M16 and AR-15 rifles. The ST Kinetics CPW can be configured for the 5.7×28mm cartridge by changing the barrel and magazine groups. Excel Arms has developed four firearms chambered in 5.7×28mm, and MasterPiece Arms offers three different 5.7×28mm firearms.

The 5.7×28mm cartridge weighs 6.0 grams (93 grains) — roughly two-thirds as much as a typical 9×19mm Parabellum cartridge — making extra ammunition less burdensome, or allowing more ammunition to be carried for the same weight. Since the 5.7×28mm cartridge also has a relatively small diameter, a relatively high number of cartridges can be contained in a magazine. The cartridge has a loud report and produces considerable muzzle flash (when fired from a pistol), but it has roughly 30 percent less recoil than the 9×19mm cartridge, improving controllability. Due to its high velocity, the 5.7×28mm also exhibits an exceptionally flat trajectory.

One of the design intents of the SS190 variety of this cartridge was that it have the ability to penetrate Kevlar protective vests — such as the NATO CRISAT vest — that will stop conventional pistol bullets. Some sources claimed that when fired from the FN P90 (10.2-inch barrel), the 5.7×28mm SS190 can penetrate the NATO CRISAT vest or a Level IIIA Kevlar vest at a range of 200 m (219 yd). Although this seems unlikely to be accurate when comparing to the more modern test results. Additionally, sporting variants of the 5.7×28mm are classified by the U.S. Bureau of Alcohol, Tobacco, Firearms and Explosives (ATF) as not armor-piercing.

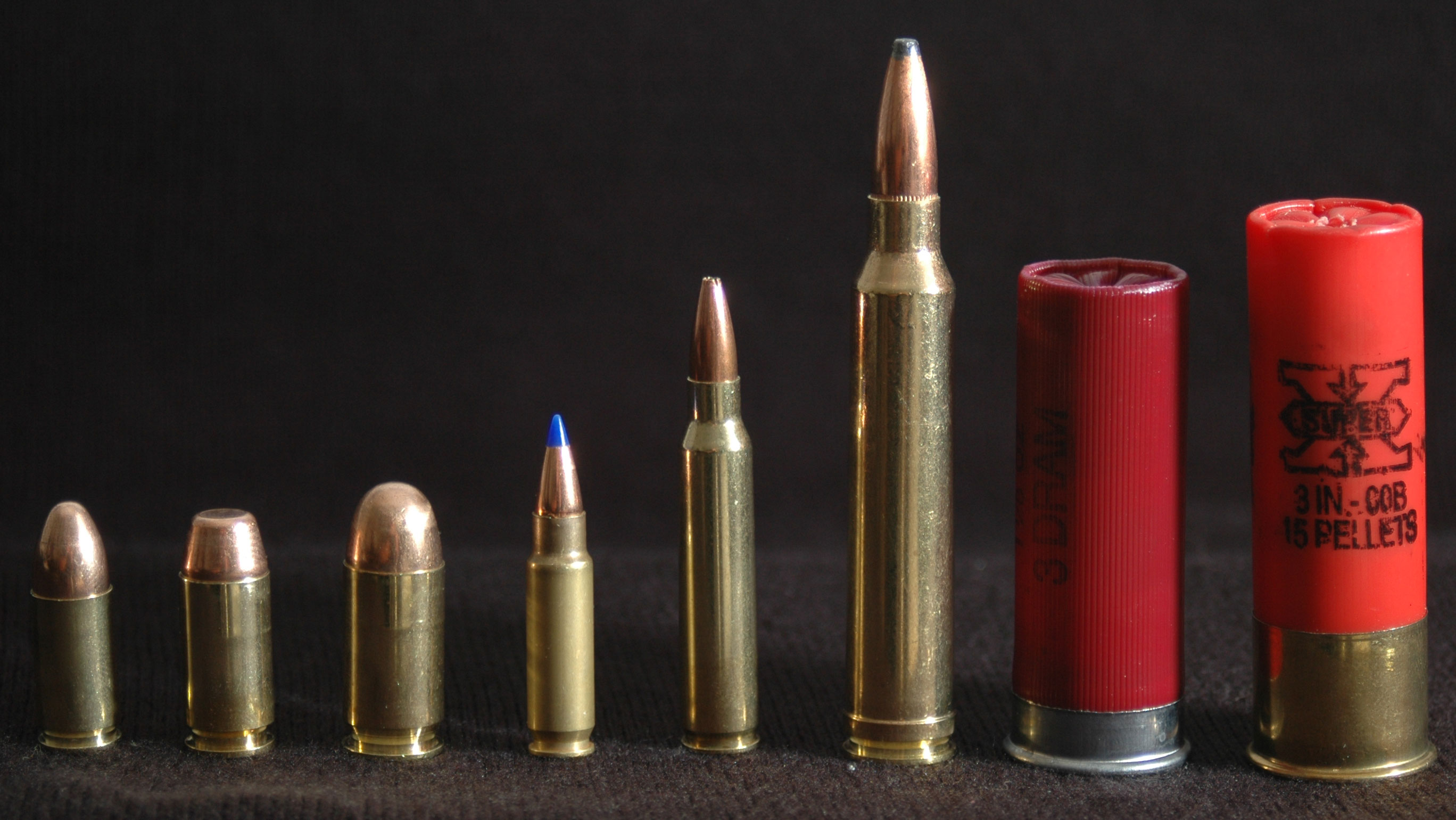
From left to right: 9×19mm Parabellum, .40 S&W, .45 ACP, 5.7×28mm, 5.56×45mm NATO, .300 Winchester Magnum, with 2.75-and-3-inch (70 and 76 mm) 12 gauge shotgun shells

According to FN, the 5.7×28mm cartridge has an effective range of 200 m (220 yd) and a maximum range of 1,800 m (2,000 yd) when fired from the P90, and an effective range of 50 m (55 yd) and a maximum range of 1,510 m (1,650 yd) when fired from the Five-seven. The lightweight of the round also reduces recoil and improves accuracy when firing the weapon. However, some are skeptical of the bullet's terminal performance, and it is a subject of debate among civilian shooters in the United States.

Since the 5.7×28mm SS190 projectile does not rely on fragmentation or the expansion of a hollow-point bullet, the cartridge (and 5.7×28mm firearms) are considered suitable for military use under the Hague Convention of 1899, which prohibits the use of expanding bullets in warfare.

FN's 5.7×28mm cartridge cases are covered with a special polymer coating for easier extraction with the PS90 carbine due to the high chamber pressures and lack of case tapering. In addition, this coating ensures proper feeding and function in the magazines.

== Cartridge dimensions ==
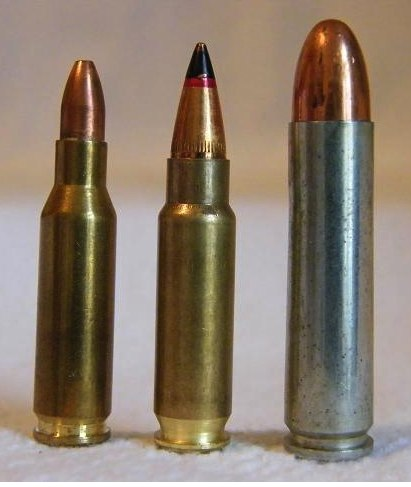
The 5.7×28mm cartridge next to similarly sized cartridges, from left to right: 4.6×30mm, 5.7×28mm, .30 Carbine

The 5.7×28mm has a cartridge case capacity of 0.90 ml (13.85 grains H_{2}O).

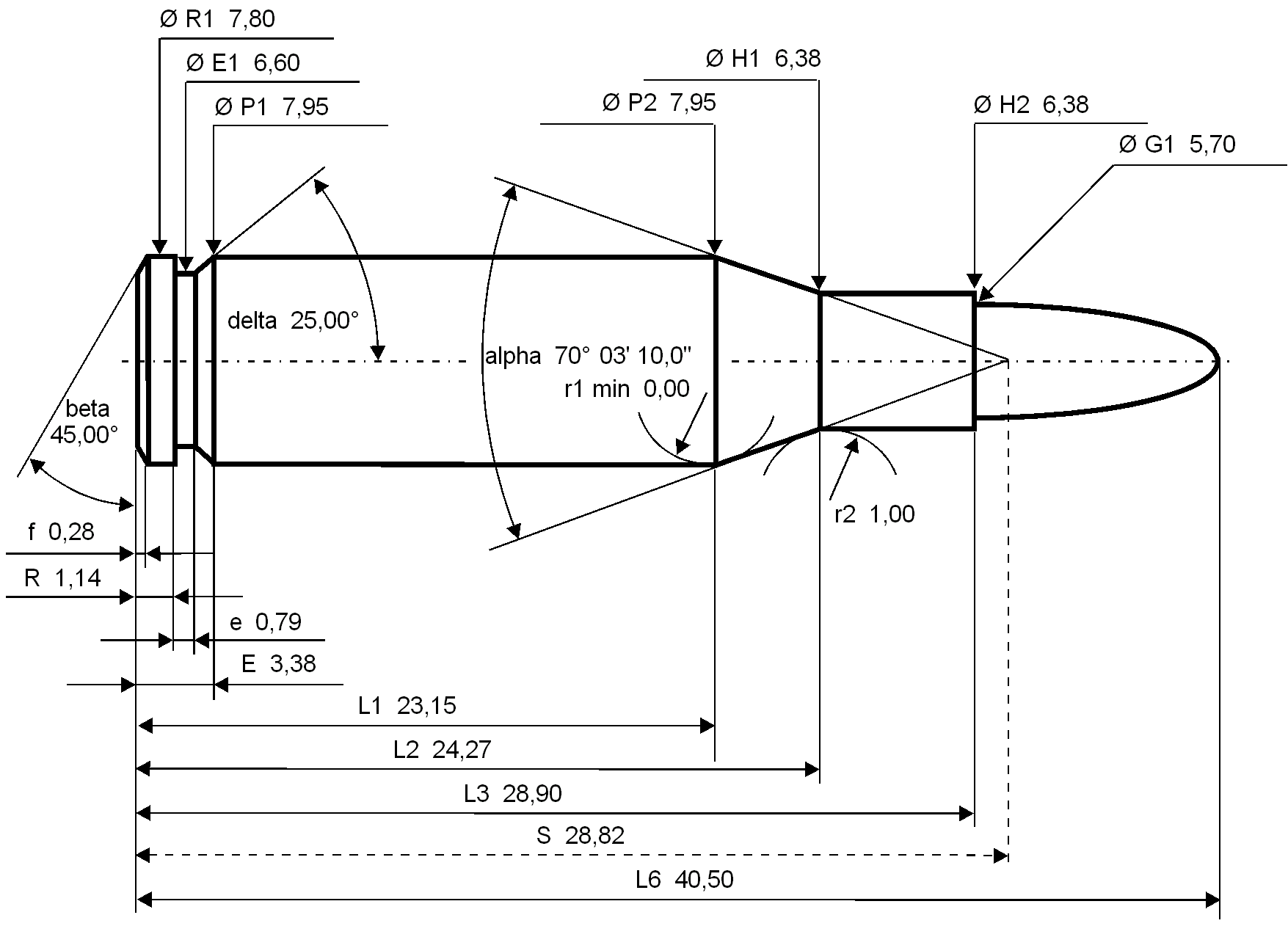
5.7×28mm maximum C.I.P. cartridge dimensions in millimeters (mm)

Americans define the shoulder angle at alpha/2 ≈ 35 degrees. The common rifling twist rate for this cartridge is 1:228.6 mm (1:9 in), 8 grooves, Ø lands = 5.53 mm, Ø grooves = 5.62 mm, land width = 1.63 mm and the recommended primer type is small rifle.

According to the official C.I.P. (Commission Internationale Permanente pour l'Epreuve des Armes à Feu Portatives) rulings, the 5.7×28mm can handle up to 3,450 bar (345 MPa; 50,038 psi) Pmax (the nominal maximum) piezo pressure. In C.I.P. regulated countries, every rifle cartridge combination has to be proofed at 125% of this maximum C.I.P. pressure to be certified for sale to consumers, referred to as "PE". This means that 5.7×28mm chambered arms in C.I.P. regulated countries are currently (2018) proof tested at 4,313 bar (431 MPa; 62,555 psi) PE piezo pressure. Despite the relatively high maximum pressure, the bolt thrust of the 5.7×28mm is on a similar level when compared with traditional service sidearm cartridges.

== Specifications ==
Name	SS190	L191	SS192	SB193	T194	SS195LF	SS196SR	SS197SR	SS198LF	AE5728A	T6B	S4M
Projectile mass	2.0 g (31 gr)	2.0 g (31 gr)	1.8 g (28 gr)	3.6 g (56 gr)	1.8 g (28 gr)	1.7 g (27 gr)	2.6 g (40 gr)	2.6 g (40 gr)	1.8 g (28 gr)	2.6 g (40 gr)	1.8 g (28 gr)	1.8 g (28 gr)
Muzzle velocity (P90)	716 m/s (2,350 ft/s)	716 m/s (2,350 ft/s)	716 m/s (2,350 ft/s)	305 m/s (1,000 ft/s)	716 m/s (2,350 ft/s)	777.2 m/s (2,550 ft/s)	549 m/s (1,800 ft/s)	594 m/s (1,950 ft/s)	792 m/s (2,600 ft/s)	583.6 m/s (1,915 ft/s)	930.6 m/s (3,053 ft/s)	930.6 m/s (3,053 ft/s)
Muzzle energy (P90)	534 J (394 ft⋅lb)	534 J (394 ft⋅lb)	467 J (344 ft⋅lb)	163 J (120 ft⋅lb)	467 J (344 ft⋅lb)	528 J (389 ft⋅lb)	393 J (290 ft⋅lb)	461 J (340 ft⋅lb)	482 J (356 ft⋅lb)	441 J (325 ft⋅lb)	788 J (581 ft lb)	788 J (581 ft⋅lb)
Projectile type	FMJ "AP"	FMJ tracer	JHP	FMJBT	JHP	JHP	V-Max	V-Max	JHP	TMJ	Turned Exotic Solid Copper	JHP
Effective range	200 m (660 ft)	200 m (660 ft)	200 m (660 ft)	50 m (160 ft)	200 m (660 ft)	200 m (660 ft)	150 m (490 ft)	150 m (490 ft)	200 m (660 ft)	200 m (660 ft)	200 m (660 ft)	200 m (660 ft)
Color code	Plain, black or white/black	Red or red/black	Plain JHP	White	Green	Plain JHP	Red V-Max	Blue V-Max	Green	Plain TMJ	Anodized Black	Plain JHP
Availability	Restricted by FN	Restricted by FN	Commercial (discontinued)	Restricted by FN	Restricted by FN (discontinued)	Commercial	Commercial (discontinued)	Commercial	Restricted by FN	Commercial	Commercial	Commercial

Fired from the longer 40.74 cm (16.04 in) barrel of the PS90, the muzzle velocity of SS195LF is roughly 60 m/s (200 ft/s) faster, and the muzzle velocity of SS197SR is roughly 45 m/s (150 ft/s) faster. Fired from the shorter 12.2 cm (4.8 in) barrel of the Five-seven pistol, the muzzle velocity of SS195LF is roughly 90 m/s (300 ft/s) slower, and the muzzle velocity of SS197SR is roughly 60 m/s (200 ft/s) slower.

== Cartridge types ==
SS90 prototype
The SS90 was an early prototype round used only in the earliest examples of the P90. It used a lightweight 1.5-g (23 grain) full metal jacket bullet with a polymer core, which it propelled at a muzzle velocity of roughly 850 m/s (2,800 ft/s). The SS90 was abandoned in 1994 in favor of the heavier and shorter 2.7 mm (0.11 in) SS190 projectile.
SS190 duty
The SS190 FMJ, a refinement of the SS90, was introduced in 1993. It offered superior performance over the prototype projectile as well as slightly reduced length. The latter change allowed it to be used more conveniently in the Five-seven pistol, also being developed at that time. Fired from the P90, the SS190 propels a 2.0-g (31 grain) bullet at a muzzle velocity of roughly 715 m/s (2,350 ft/s). It has a steel penetrator and an aluminum core. The SS190 has been manufactured with a plain, black, and a black-on-white tip color. It is classified by the ATF as armor-piercing (AP) handgun ammunition, and its sale is currently restricted by FN to military and law enforcement customers.
In testing done by Houston Police Department SWAT, the SS190 fired from the P90 into bare ballistic gelatin exhibited penetration depths ranging from 28 to 34 cm (11 to 13.5 in). In testing in 1999 by the Royal Canadian Mounted Police (RCMP), the SS190 fired from the P90 at a distance of 25 m (27 yd) exhibited an average penetration depth of 25 cm (9.8 in) in ballistic gelatin after passing through a Level II Kevlar vest.

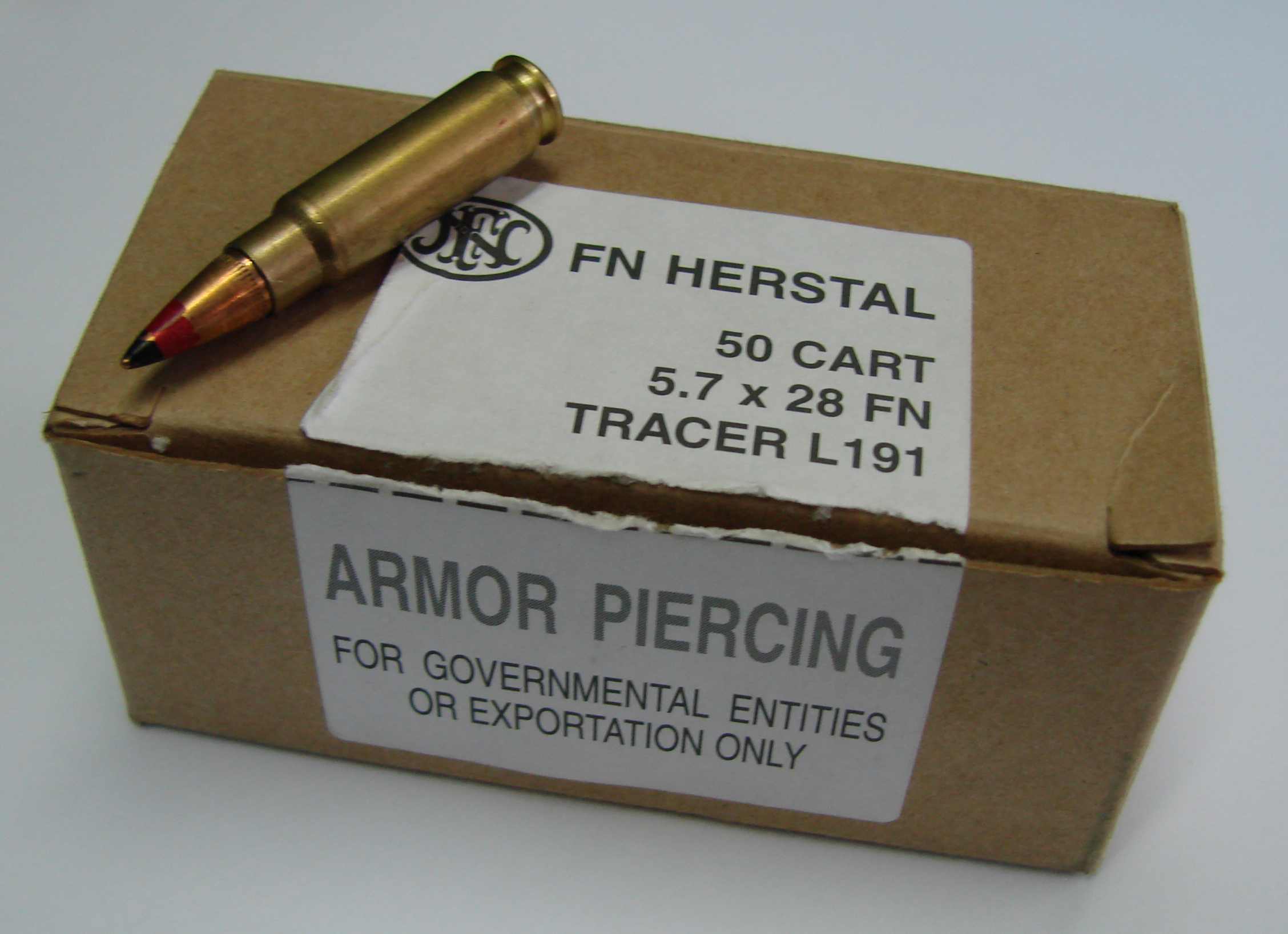
L191 cartridge and box

L191 tracer
The L191 (also formerly called the SS191) is a tracer cartridge designed for easier bullet spotting in dim light. Combustible chemicals packed in the rear of the L191 projectile create a light trail visible up to 200 m (220 yd). The L191 has been manufactured with red and red-on-black tips. The performance and trajectory of the L191 is identical to the SS190. For this reason, it is also classified by the ATF as armor-piercing handgun ammunition, and its sale is currently restricted by FN to military and law enforcement customers.
SS192 hollow-point
The SS192 was discontinued in late 2004. It used a 1.8 g (28 grain) hollow point bullet with a copper jacket and an aluminum core. The projectile had a length of 21.6 mm (0.85 in). It had an unmarked hollow nose with a depth of 7.6 mm (0.30 in) and a 0.8 mm (0.031 in) opening. The SS192 was classified by the ATF as not armor-piercing, and in testing by FNH USA it did not penetrate a Level IIIA vest when fired from the Five-seven.
SB193 subsonic
The SB193 (also formerly called the SS193) is a subsonic cartridge featuring a 3.6-g (55 grain) Sierra Game King FMJBT (FMJ boat tail) projectile. The SB193's sub-sonic speed eliminates the distinctive "crack" created by supersonic rounds. The muzzle report is also reduced when using the sub-sonic ammunition together with a suppressor. Due to the greatly decreased muzzle velocity, the SB193 benefits from a slightly reduced recoil force of 1.3 kgm/s. The SB193 can be identified by its white tip color. Its sale is currently restricted by FN to military and law enforcement customers.
T194 training
The T194 training round was discontinued in 2002. It could be considered an early version of the SS192 or SS195. It used the same 1.8-g (28 grain) copper-jacketed aluminum core bullet, propelled at the same muzzle velocity. It had a green tip.

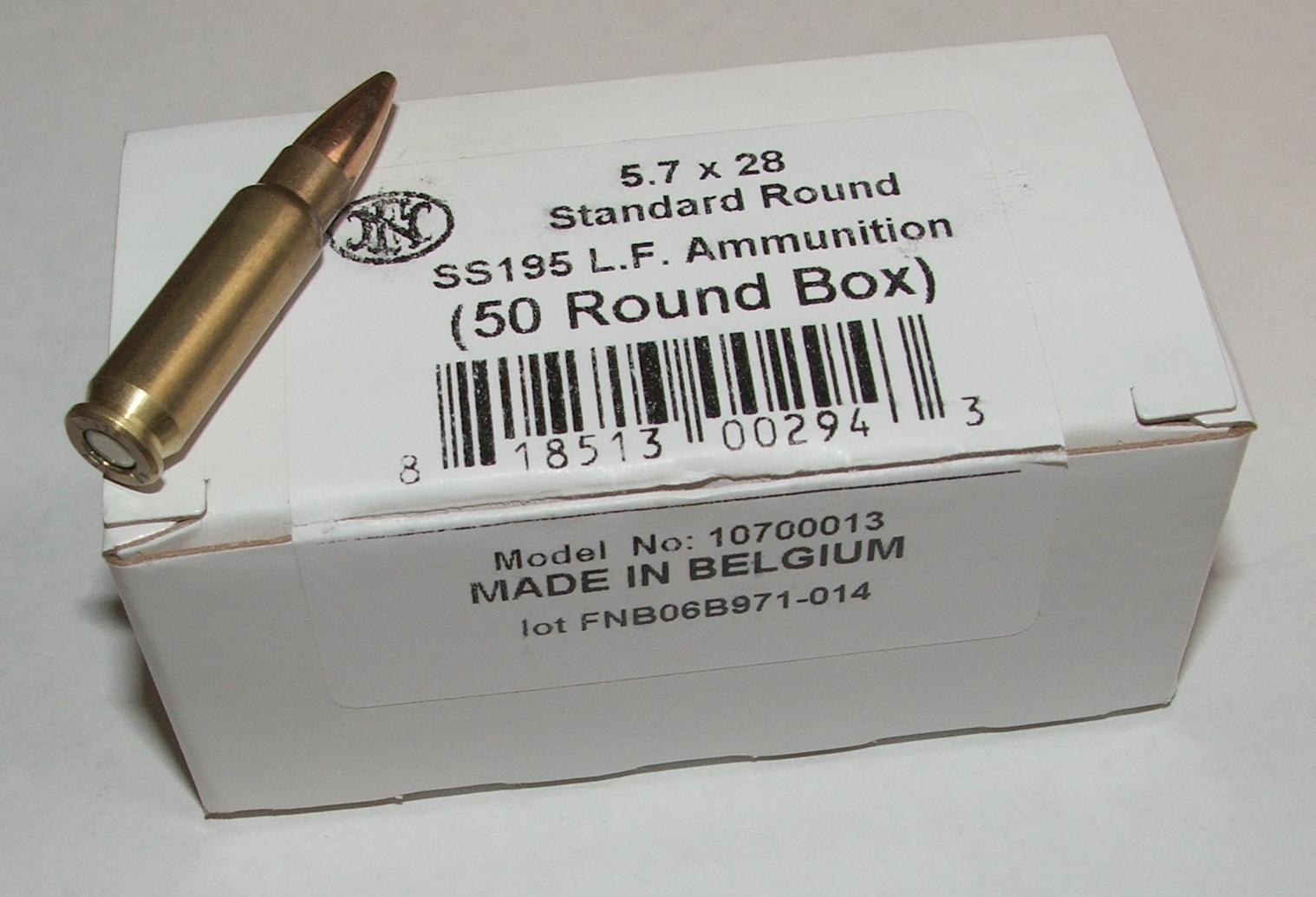
SS195LF cartridge and box

SS195LF (lead free)
The SS195LF is a commercially available cartridge that features a lead-free primer and produces ballistics similar to the SS192 round, which it replaced in late 2004. It uses the same 1.8-g (28 grain) copper-jacketed aluminum core bullet as the SS192, and it can be identified by the unmarked, hollow void at the tip and the silver-colored primer. The SS195 is classified by the ATF as not armor-piercing, and it is currently manufactured by FN Herstal in Belgium.
SS196SR (sporting round)
The SS196SR was introduced in 2005 and it is now discontinued in favor of the SS197SR cartridge. It featured a lead core 2.6-g (40 grain) Hornady V-Max bullet which it propelled at a muzzle velocity of roughly 500 m/s (1,600 ft/s) when fired from the Five-seven. The polycarbonate tip used in the V-Max bullet acted as a wedge, enhancing expansion of the bullet. The SS196 was classified by the ATF as not armor-piercing, and in testing by FNH USA it did not penetrate a Level II vest when fired from the Five-seven. The SS196 could be identified by its red polymer tip.
SS197SR (sporting round)

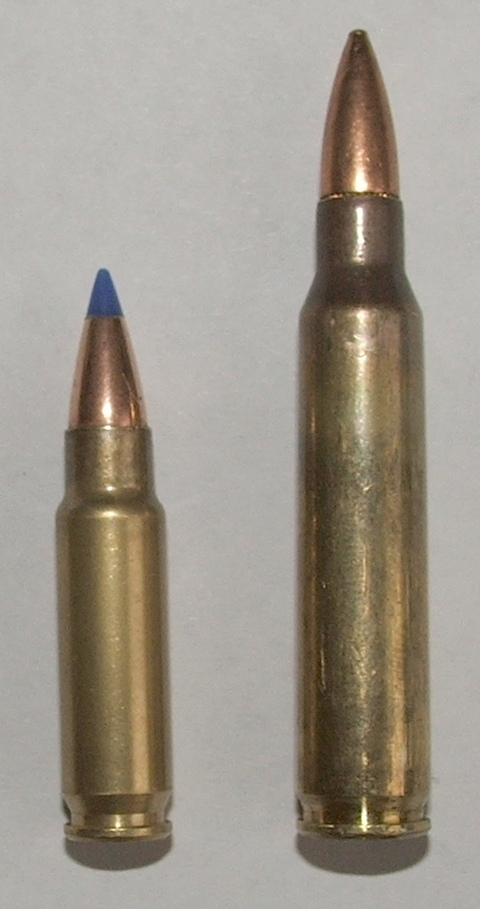
SS197SR (left) and 5.56×45mm NATO (right)

The SS197SR is currently offered to civilian shooters in addition to the SS195LF. It uses the same lead core 2.6-g (40 grain) Hornady V-Max projectile as the SS196SR, but it is loaded for a muzzle velocity roughly 30 m/s (98 ft/s) higher. The projectile has a blue-colored polymer tip instead of the red color used in the SS196 projectile tip. The SS197 has been manufactured by Fiocchi, under contract for FN Herstal, since 2006 and it is distributed in the United States by Federal Cartridge Company.
SS198LF (lead free)
The SS198LF uses the same lead-free projectile and primer as the SS195LF, but propels it at roughly a 30 m/s (98 ft/s) higher muzzle velocity. It’s manufactured in Belgium. It has a green painted tip, and its sale is currently restricted by FN to military and law enforcement customers, but is widely available through retailers to civilian customers.
American Eagle (AE5728A) TMJ
Since 2012, Federal Cartridge Company markets a loading produced by Fiocchi using a 5.7×28mm round under their American Eagle brand. Designated the AE5728A, this cartridge uses a 40-grain total metal jacket (TMJ) projectile, that is atypical in that it does not use a copper-plated bullet. The AE5728A casings are of FN manufacture, and the muzzle velocity is slightly lower than that of the SS197SR.
Non-FN ammunition
Elite Ammunition manufactures a wide variety of loaded 5.7×28mm ammunition offerings, including the "T6B" and "S4M" cartridges.
Handloading
Handloading is possible with 5.7×28mm ammunition, and 5.7 mm (0.22 in) bullets are widely available due to use in .223 Remington and 5.56×45mm NATO cartridges. Handloaders have noted that the 5.7×28mm cartridge is very sensitive to small changes in powder charge or overall length (OAL) with a bullet inserted. Bullets weighing 2.6 g (40 grains) or less are recommended for optimal use in 5.7×28mm applications, but the 228.6 mm (1:9 in) rifling twist rate (distance the bullet must travel to complete one full revolution) used in the firearms' barrels will stabilize bullets weighing up to 4.5 g (70 grains).

== Platforms ==
Manufacturer	Name	Country	Type	Introduced	Note
AR57 LLC	AR-57	United States	Personal defense weapon		M16 lower receiver with a redesigned upper receiver fed by FN P90 magazines
FN Herstal	FN P90; FN PS90	Belgium	Personal defense weapon	1990; 2005	Select fire
ST Kinetics	ST Kinetics CPW	Singapore	Personal defense weapon		
Excel Arms	Accelerator Pistol MP-5.7	United States	Pistol		
Diamondback Firearms	DBX57	United States	Pistol		can use the Five-seveN magazine
FNH	FN Five-seven	Belgium	Pistol	1998	
RPC Fort	Fort 28	Ukraine	Pistol		
KelTec	KelTec P50; KelTec R50	United States	Semi-automatic rifle Pistol	2023	Can use P90 magazines
KelTec	SUB-2000	United States	Semi-automatic rifle	2024	Can use FN Five-seven magazines
KelTec	Kel-Tec PR57	United States	Pistol	2025	Uses stripper clips
Smith & Wesson	M&P 5.7	United States	Pistol		
Palmetto State Armory	PSA 5.7 Rock	United States	Pistol	2022	
Palmetto State Armory	PSA X5.7	United States	Pistol		can use the PSA 5.7 Rock magazine
Ruger	Ruger-5.7	United States	Pistol	December 2019	
Dark Mountain Arms	Stowaway	United States	Bolt action rifle/pistol		
Van Bruaene Rik – Belgium	VBR PDW/CQBW	Belgium	Pistol		
V8VTwin / Lulzgoat / AWCY?	3DP90		Semi-automatic rifle	May 2023	3D printed firearm based on the FN P90
Excel Arms	X-5.7P Basic Pistol 30RD	United States	Semi-automatic rifle		can use the Five-seveN magazine
CMMG	CMMG Banshee, Mk57/Mk4 CMMG Resolute, Mk57/Mk4; CMMG Dissent, Mk57/Mk4	United States	Semi-automatic rifle Pistol		Mk57 versions can use the Five-seveN magazine
Excel Arms	Excel Arms MR-57	United States	Semi-automatic rifle		
Masterpiece Arms	MPA57000DMG; MPA57	United States	Semi-automatic rifle Pistol		can use the Five-seveN magazine
Ruger	Ruger LC Carbine	United States	Semi-automatic rifle		
Savage	Savage 25 Walking Varminter	United States	Bolt action rifle	2011	Not currently being made according to manufacturer's website
ST Kinetics	STK SSW	Singapore	Combination gun		Combined with 40 mm grenade launcher
Tisas	PX-5.7	Turkey	Pistol	Aug 2024	20-cartridge capacity
