= AR-57 =

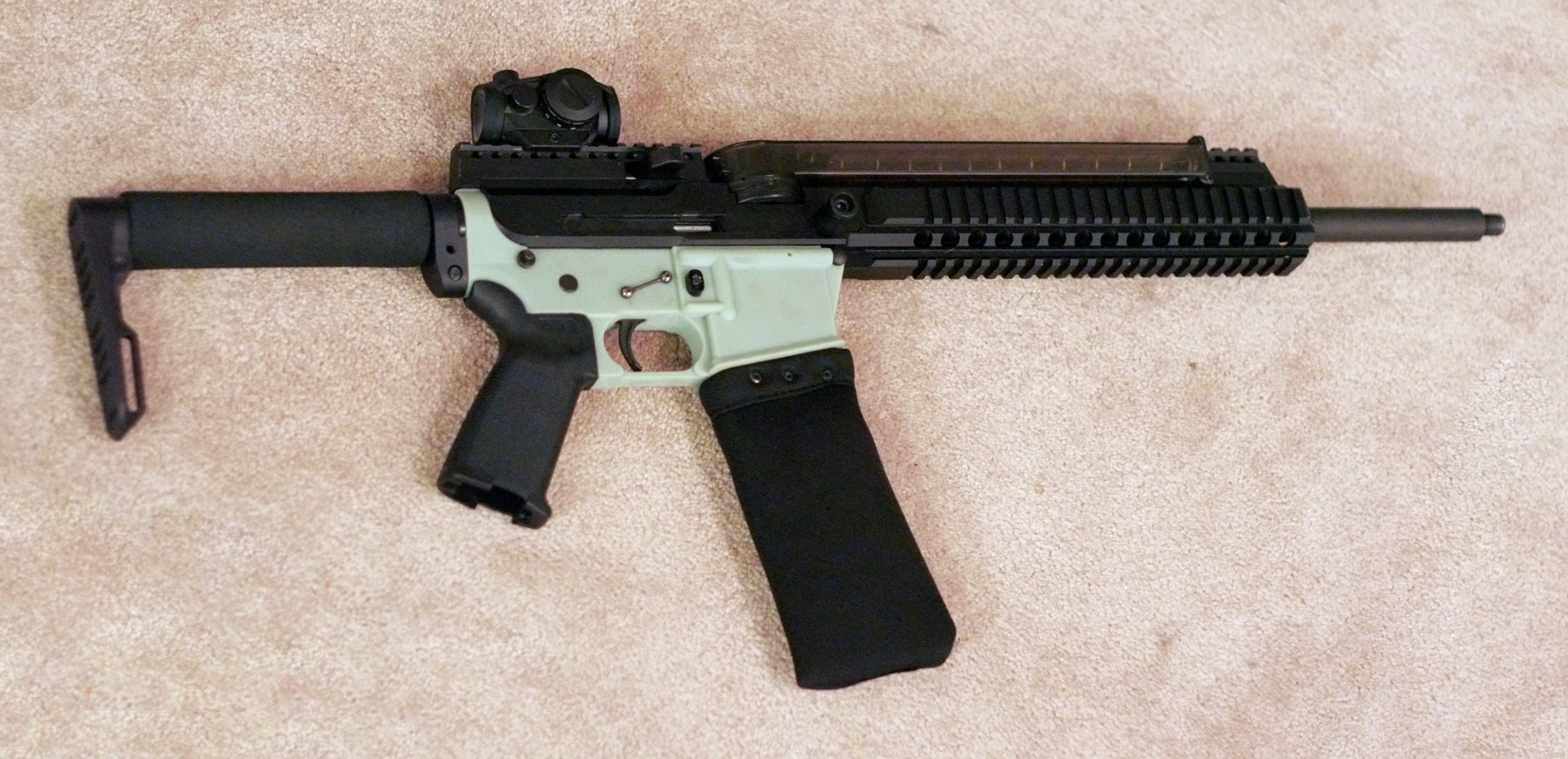
- The AR-57
- Type: Semi-automatic rifle/pistol-caliber carbine (civilian variant); Personal defense weapon Submachine gun
- Place of origin: United States

Service history
- In service: 2019–present
- Wars: Venezuelan crisis

Production history
- Designed: 2008–2016
- Manufacturer: Rhineland Arms (original), AR57 LLC
- Unit cost: US$1,099
- Produced: 2008–present

Specifications
- Mass: 7.45 lb (3.4 kg) (AR-57 PDW)
- Length: 30 in (762.0 mm) (AR-57 PDW)
- Barrel length: 16 in (406.4 mm) (AR-57 PDW)
- Cartridge: FN 5.7×28mm
- Feed system: FN P90 detachable box magazines
- Sights: M1913 Picatinny rail

The AR-57, also known as the AR Five Seven, is available as either an upper receiver for the AR-15/M16 rifle or a complete rifle, firing 5.7×28mm rounds from standard FN P90 magazines.

It was originally designed by Rhineland Arms but produced by AR57 LLC.

== Design ==
The AR-57 PDW upper is a new design on AR-15/M16 rifles, blending the AR-15/M16 lower with a lightweight, monolithic upper receiver system chambered in 5.7×28mm. This model is also sold as a complete rifle, supplied with two 50-round P90 magazines. The magazines mount horizontally on top of the front handguard, with brass ejecting through the magazine well. AR-15/M16-based STANAG magazines can be used to catch spent casings by taking out the feed lips, spring and follower. Sheet metal brass catchers can also be used on the AR-15/M16 lower.

Various scopes and other accessories can be mounted on the picatinny rail.

Unlike the standard AR-15 configuration which uses a gas-tube system, the AR-57 cycles via straight blowback. A fully automatic version exists and was marketed as a competitor to the P90 and other personal defense weapons.

Suppressed versions are also available.

== User ==
- Venezuela: Venezuelan soldiers who defected to Juan Guaidó were photographed using an AR-57 during the crisis in Venezuela in 2019.
