= PSA 5.7 Rock =

PSA 5.7 ROCK
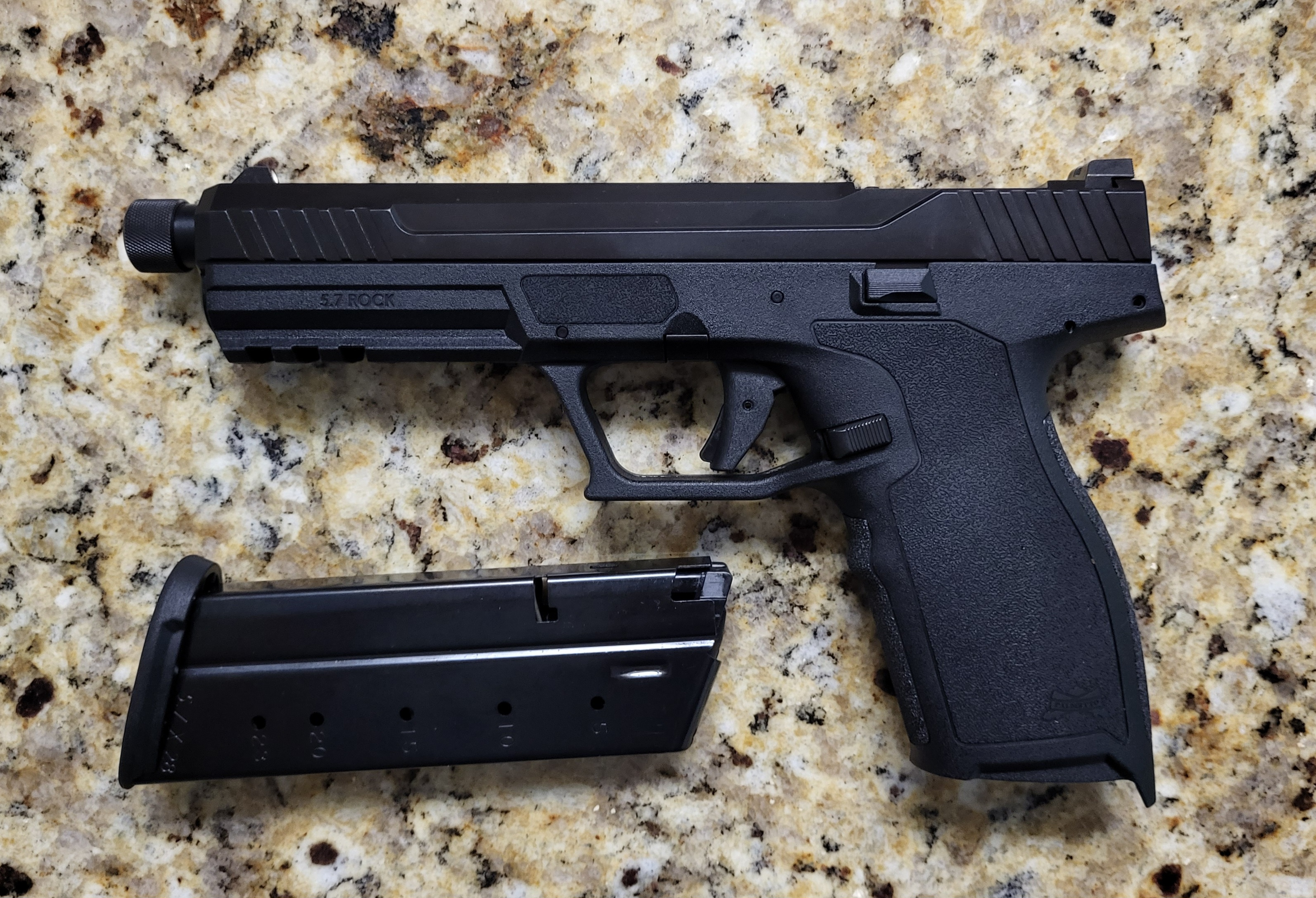
- A PSA 5.7 Rock with a threaded barrel and a 23 round magazine.
- Place of origin: United States

Production history
- Designer: Palmetto State Armory
- Unit cost: $499
- Produced: 2022–present

Specifications
- Mass: 709 g (25.0 oz)
- Length: 205 mm (8.1 in)
- Barrel length: 120 mm (4.7 in)
- Width: 32 mm (1.3 in)
- Height: 136 mm (5.4 in)
- Cartridge: 5.7x28mm
- Caliber: 5.70 mm (0.224 in)
- Feed system: 23-round magazine
- Sights: Glock compatible, picatinny rail

The 5.7 Rock is a semi-automatic pistol developed, manufactured, and sold by Palmetto State Armory.

== Design ==
The gun uses a smooth single-action striker-fired trigger mechanism. It is chambered for the FN 5.7×28mm cartridge and is characterized by its generally low recoil.

The frame is made out of polymer, the slide and barrel are made out of 416 stainless steel and the magazine is made out of black oxide alloy steel.

PSA offers the barrel finished in several colors, it can be bought threaded and non-threaded.

The standard magazine holds 23 rounds, 3 more than the FN Five-seven. It is also a competitor to the Ruger-5.7, the M&P 5.7 and the TİSAŞ PX-5.7.

== Variants ==
- RK1
- Compact

== Users ==
- City of Cut and Shoot, Texas, Police Department (November 2023)
