= Collaborative Research into Small Arms Technology =

Series of studies conducted by NATO

Collaborative Research Into Small Arms Technology (CRISAT) is the name of a series of studies conducted by the North Atlantic Treaty Organisation (NATO), identifying and defining threats with regard to the standardisation in the manufacturing of military equipment. The CRISAT target is defined as a 1.6 mm titanium (UK IMI Ti 318) plate supplemented by 20 layers of Kevlar (UK/SC/4468) as defined in STANAG 4512. The CRISAT target will stop the commonly used 9×19mm Parabellum full metal jacket cartridge, but it is pierced by the newer 5.7×28mm and 4.6×30mm personal defense weapon cartridges.

== Areas of study ==
=== Technology Area 1 ===
This study concerns Target Definition. It was done by the U.S. It defines for example the area of a CRISAT crouching man: 0.37m^{2}.

=== Technology Area 2 ===
This study concerns Terminal Effects. It was done by the U.K. It defines the ability to incapacitate within a few seconds, the Rapid Incapacitation Target (RIT) model.

=== Technology Area 3 ===
This study concerns Target Acquisition. It was done by France.

=== Technology Area 4 ===
This study concerns Materials. It was done by the U.S.

=== Technology Area 5 ===
This study concerns Propellants. It was done by Germany.

=== Technology Area 6 ===
Undisclosed.

=== Technology Area 7 ===
Undisclosed.

=== Technology Area 8 ===
This study concerns Power & Electronics Systems. It was done by the U.S.

=== Technology Area 9 ===
This study concerns Analysis of Effectiveness. It was done by the U.K.
