= Tisas PX-5.7 =

TİSAŞ PX-5.7
- Type: Semi-automatic pistol
- Place of origin: Turkey

Production history
- Manufacturer: TİSAŞ
- Unit cost: US$499.00 (MSRP)
- Produced: 2024–present

Specifications
- Mass: 24.5 oz (690 g)
- Length: 8.64 in (219 mm)
- Barrel length: 4.82 in (122 mm)
- Width: 1.38 in (35 mm) (slide)
- Height: 5.57 in (141 mm)
- Cartridge: 5.7×28mm
- Action: Delayed blowback
- Feed system: 20-round box magazine
- Sights: Adjustable rear sight and fiber optic front sight

The Tisas PX-5.7 is a polymer-frame auto-loading pistol introduced in 2024 by Tisas and made in Turkey. It is a competitor to the FN Five-seven, the Ruger-5.7, the Smith & Wesson M&P 5.7 and the PSA Rock 5.7.

As of mid 2024, it was the least expensive pistol chambered for the 5.7×28mm round.

== Design ==
The PX-5.7 is chambered for the 5.7×28mm cartridge and uses magazines that hold 20 rounds.It operates on a delayed blowback system.
