= P80 =

P80 may refer to:

== Automobiles ==
- BMW P80, a family of Formula One engines
- Toyota Starlet (P80), a Japanese car
- Volvo P80 platform, a Swedish mid-size automobile platform
- WM P80, a French prototype racing car

== Other vehicles ==
- P80 (rocket stage), a rocket engine
- INS Kavaratti (P80), a corvette of the Indian Navy
- Lockheed P-80 Shooting Star, an American jet fighter
- Pottier P.80, a French sport aircraft

== Other uses ==
- Nikon Coolpix P80, a digital camera
- P80, a national road of Latvia
- Pestivirus NS3 polyprotein peptidase, an enzyme
- p80, a subunit of the protein Katanin

== See also ==
- Pistole 80, a military designation for the Glock pistol
- Polymer80, an American firearms manufacturer
