= P90 (disambiguation) =

FN P90 is a compact 5.7×28mm personal defense weapon designed and manufactured by FN Herstal.

P90 or P-90 may also refer to:

- HMAS Attack (P 90), the lead ship of the Attack-class patrol boats used by the Royal Australian Navy
- Nikon Coolpix P90, a 12-megapixel CCD digital camera
- P-90, a single coil electric guitar pickup produced by Gibson
- P90, the fifth-generation Toyota Starlet subcompact car
- P90, a state regional road in Latvia
- Papyrus 90 (also 𝔓^{90}), a small fragment from the Gospel of John
- Ruger P90, a variant of the Ruger P series line of centerfire semi-automatic pistols
- P90, the 90th percentile
