= FN P90 =

Belgian compact personal defense weapon

- P90 5.7×28mm
- Type: Personal defense weapon
- Place of origin: Belgium

Service history
- In service: 1990–present
- Used by: See Users
- Wars: Internal conflict in Peru; War in Afghanistan; Iraq War; Mexican drug war; Libyan Civil War

Production history
- Designer: Rene Predazzer
- Designed: 1986–90
- Manufacturer: FN Herstal
- Produced: 1990–present (Note: The revised 5.7 SS190 cartridge, which would become the main chambering of P90, was developed in 1993. See Watters, Daniel E.)
- Variants: See Variants

Specifications
- Mass: 2.6 kg (5.8 lb) (P90); 2.85 kg (6.28 lb) (PS90)
- Length: 50.5 cm (19.9 in) (P90); 66.6 cm (26.2 in) (PS90)
- Barrel length: 26.4 cm (10.4 in) (P90); 40.7 cm (16.0 in) (PS90)
- Width: 5.5 cm (2.2 in)
- Height: 21 cm (8.3 in)
- Cartridge: FN 5.7×28mm
- Action: Straight blowback, closed bolt
- Rate of fire: 850–1,100 rounds/min
- Muzzle velocity: 715 m/s (2,350 ft/s)
- Effective firing range: 200 m (660 ft)
- Maximum firing range: 1,800 m (5,900 ft)
- Feed system: 50-round detachable box magazine
- Sights: Tritium-illuminated reflex sight, back-up iron sights

The FN P90 is a personal defense weapon chambered for the 5.7×28mm cartridge, also classified as a submachine gun, designed and manufactured by FN Herstal in Belgium. Created in response to NATO requests for a replacement for 9×19mm Parabellum firearms, the P90 was designed as a compact but powerful firearm for vehicle crews, operators of crew-served weapons, support personnel, special forces, and counter-terrorist groups.

Designed in conjunction with the FN 5.7×28mm NATO ammunition, development of the weapon began in 1986, and production commenced in 1990, when it was known as the Project 9.0 (from which the "90" in its name is derived), whereupon the 5.7×28mm ammunition was redesigned and shortened. A modified version of the P90 with a magazine adapted to use the new ammunition was introduced in 1993, and the Five-seven pistol was subsequently introduced as a companion weapon using the same 5.7×28mm ammunition.

Featuring a compact bullpup design with an integrated reflex sight and fully ambidextrous controls, the P90 is an unconventional weapon with a futuristic appearance. Its design incorporates several innovations, such as a unique top-mounted magazine and FN's small-caliber, high-velocity 5.7×28mm ammunition. Additional integrated features include interchangeable visible or infrared laser and tritium light sources.

The P90 is currently in service with military and police forces in over 40 nations, such as Austria, Brazil, Canada, France, Greece, India, Malaysia, Poland, and the United States. In the United States, the P90 is in use with over 200 law enforcement agencies, including the U.S. Secret Service. In the United States, the standard selective fire P90 is restricted to the military, law enforcement, or holders of certain Federal Firearms Licenses (FFLs) with the Special Occupational Tax (SOT). Since 2005, a semi-automatic version with a longer barrel has been offered to civilian users as the PS90.

== History ==
=== Development ===
The P90 and its 5.7×28mm ammunition were developed by the Belgian company FN Herstal in response to NATO requests for a replacement for the 9×19mm Parabellum cartridge and associated pistols and submachine guns. NATO called for two types of weapons chambered for a new cartridge—one a shoulder-fired weapon, and the other a handheld weapon, with the latter leading to the FN Five-seven. According to NATO, these new weapons, termed personal defense weapons (PDWs), were to provide "personal protection in last-resort situations when the user is directly endangered by the enemy [...]." In 1989, NATO published document D/296, outlining a number of preliminary specifications for these weapons:

- The new cartridge was to have greater range, accuracy, and terminal performance than the 9×19mm cartridge. Additionally, it was to be capable of penetrating body armor.
- The shoulder-fired personal defense weapon was to weigh less than 3 kg (6.6 lb), with a magazine capacity of at least 20 rounds.
- The handheld personal defense weapon (pistol) was to weigh less than 1 kg (2.2 lb), although a weight of 700 g (1.5 lb) was deemed desirable; it was to have a magazine capacity of at least 20 rounds.
- Both weapons were to be sufficiently compact to be carried hands-free on the user's person at all times, whether in the cab of a vehicle or the cockpit of an aircraft, and were to perform effectively in all environments and weather conditions.

FN Herstal was the first small arms manufacturer to respond to NATO's requirement; FN started by developing a shoulder-fired personal defense weapon, the P90, along with a small caliber, high velocity 5.7×28mm cartridge type. The original 5.7×28mm cartridge, called the SS90, went into production with the P90 in 1990. The SS90 propelled a 1.5 g (23 grain) plastic-core projectile from the P90 at a muzzle velocity of roughly 850 metres per second (2,800 ft/s).

Following the P90's introduction, FN revised the 5.7×28mm ammunition. The new variation, designated the SS190, used a projectile 2.7 mm (0.11 in) shorter in length than that of the SS90. This allowed it to be used more conveniently in the 5.7×28mm FN Five-seven pistol, which was under development at that time. The SS190 projectile had more weight and a more conventional construction with an aluminium and steel core. The first prototypes of the SS190 were created in 1992, and the design was finalized in 1993, replacing the SS90. A modified version of the P90, with a magazine adapted to use the shortened ammunition, was then introduced in the same year. Several special cartridge variations were developed, such as the L191 tracer round and the SB193 subsonic round for use with a sound-suppressed P90.

=== NATO evolution ===
In 2002 and 2003, NATO conducted a series of tests with the intention of standardizing a PDW cartridge as a replacement for the 9×19mm Parabellum cartridge. The tests compared the relative merits of the FN 5.7×28mm cartridge and the HK 4.6×30mm cartridge, which was created by German small arms manufacturer Heckler & Koch as a competitor to the 5.7×28mm. The results of the NATO tests were analyzed by a group formed of experts from Canada, France, the United Kingdom, and the United States. The group's conclusion was that the 5.7×28mm was statistically the more efficient cartridge; However, NATO countries could not reach the general consensus to standardized 5.7×28mm, which halted the standardization process indefinitely. As a result, both the 4.6×30mm and 5.7×28mm cartridges (and the associated weapons) have been independently adopted by various NATO countries, according to preference; the P90 is currently in service with some military and police force units in over 40 countries. The 5.7x28mm was eventually standardized by NATO in February 2021.

=== Present ===
Further development of the P90 led to the creation of the P90 TR model, which has a MIL-STD-1913 (Picatinny) triple rail interface for mounting accessories. This model was introduced in late 1999 and continues to be offered alongside the standard P90. More recently, the P90 has been offered to civilian shooters as the PS90, a semi-automatic carbine intended for personal protection and sporting use.

== Design ==
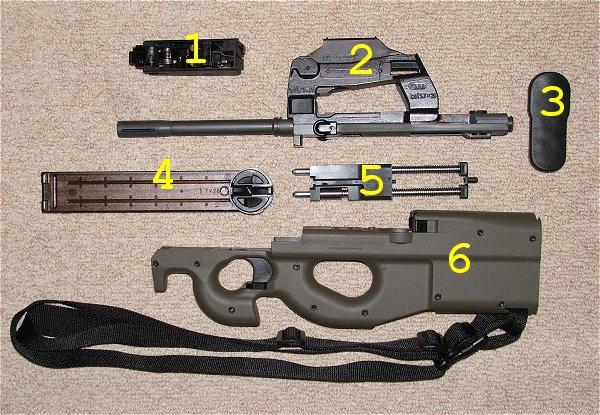
A disassembled PS90 carbine, showing the major component groups. The standard P90 disassembles into similar component groups: 1) trigger group, 2) barrel & upper receiver, 3) butt plate, 4) magazine, 5) bolt carrier, 6) frame / lower receiver

The P90 is a selective fire, straight blowback-operated weapon with a cyclic rate of fire of around 850–1,100 rounds per minute. The weapon is chambered for FN's 5.7×28mm ammunition. Its unusual shape is based on extensive ergonomic research. The weapon is grasped by means of a thumbhole in the frame that acts as a pistol grip, as well as an oversized trigger guard that acts as a foregrip for the shooter's support hand. The P90 fires from a closed bolt for maximum accuracy, and its design makes extensive use of polymers for reduced weight and cost. Overall, the weapon is relatively lightweight, weighing 2.5 kg (5.5 lb) empty, or 3 kg (6.6 lb) with a loaded 50-round magazine.

The P90 is notable for being fully ambidextrous—it can be operated by right or left-handed shooters with equal ease, and without making any modifications to the weapon. FN Herstal has described it as the "first fully ambidextrous individual automatic weapon." The charging handle, magazine release and backup iron sights are symmetrically distributed on both sides of the weapon, and the firing selector is located directly at the foot of the trigger, where it can be operated from either side by the shooter's trigger finger or support hand thumb. When fired, the P90 ejects spent cartridge casings downward through a chute located behind the grip, so spent cases are kept out of the shooter's line of sight.

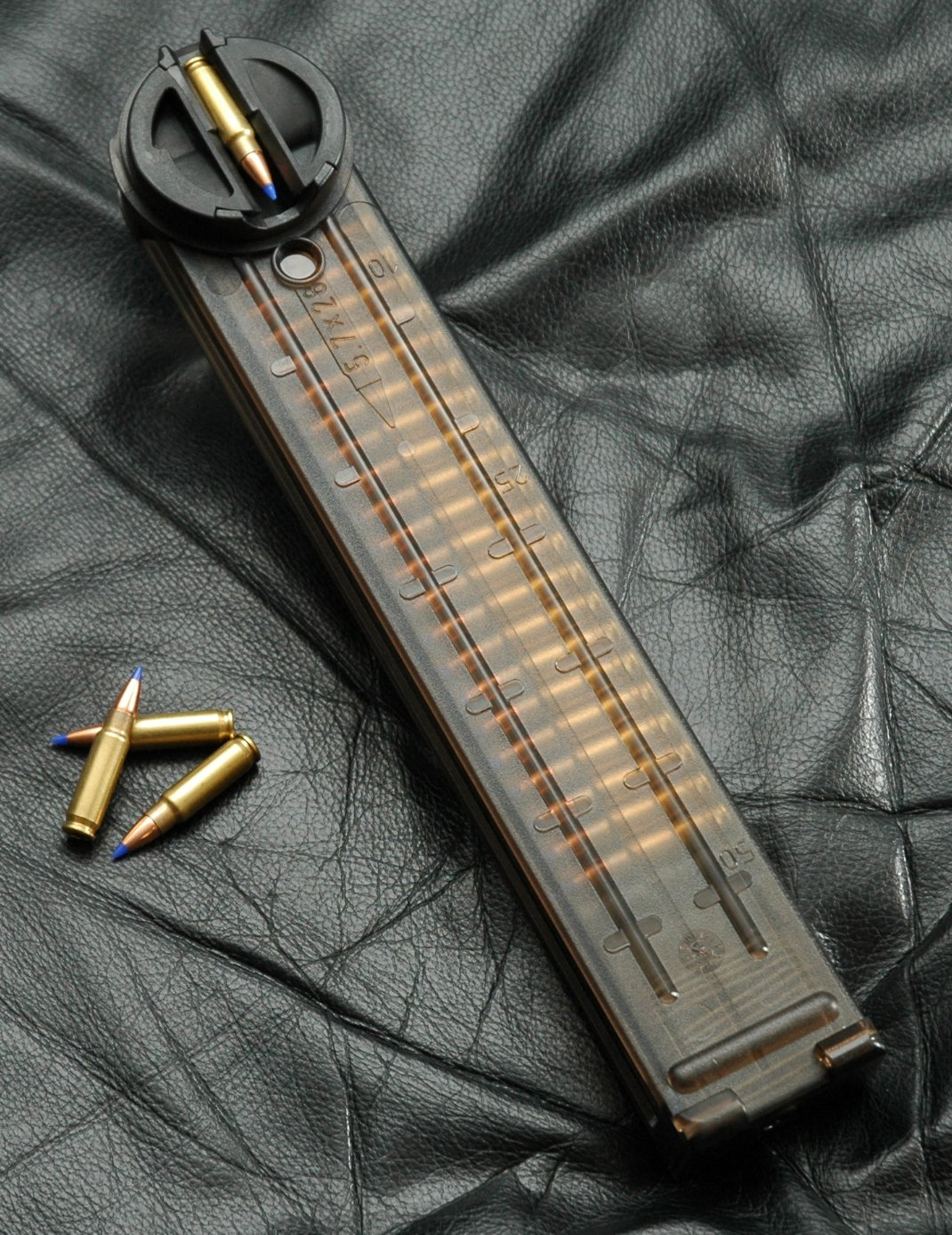
The P90's unique magazine has a capacity of 50 rounds, and it fits flush with the weapon's frame

The P90 can be fitted with a sling for greater ease of carry, and since the weapon has a fixed stock (as opposed to having a collapsing or folding stock), it can be quickly deployed when needed. The weapon's smooth, rounded contours prevent it from snagging on the shooter's clothing or equipment, and a small handstop at the weapon's front prevents the shooter's support hand from slipping in front of the muzzle while firing. A hollow compartment inside the rear of the weapon's frame—accessed by removing the buttplate—allows for storage of a cleaning kit.

The P90 was designed to have a length no greater than a man's shoulder width, to allow it to be easily carried and maneuvered in tight spaces, such as the inside of an armored vehicle. To achieve this, the weapon's design uses the unconventional bullpup configuration, in which the action and magazine are located behind the trigger and alongside the shooter's face so that there is no wasted space in the stock. The P90's dimensions are minimized by its unique horizontally mounted feeding system, wherein the box magazine sits parallel to the barrel on top of the weapon's frame. The weapon overall has an extremely compact profile—it is the most compact fixed-stock submachine gun to be made. The standard version of the weapon has an overall length of 500 mm (20 in), a height of 210 mm (8.3 in), and a width of 55 mm (2.2 in).

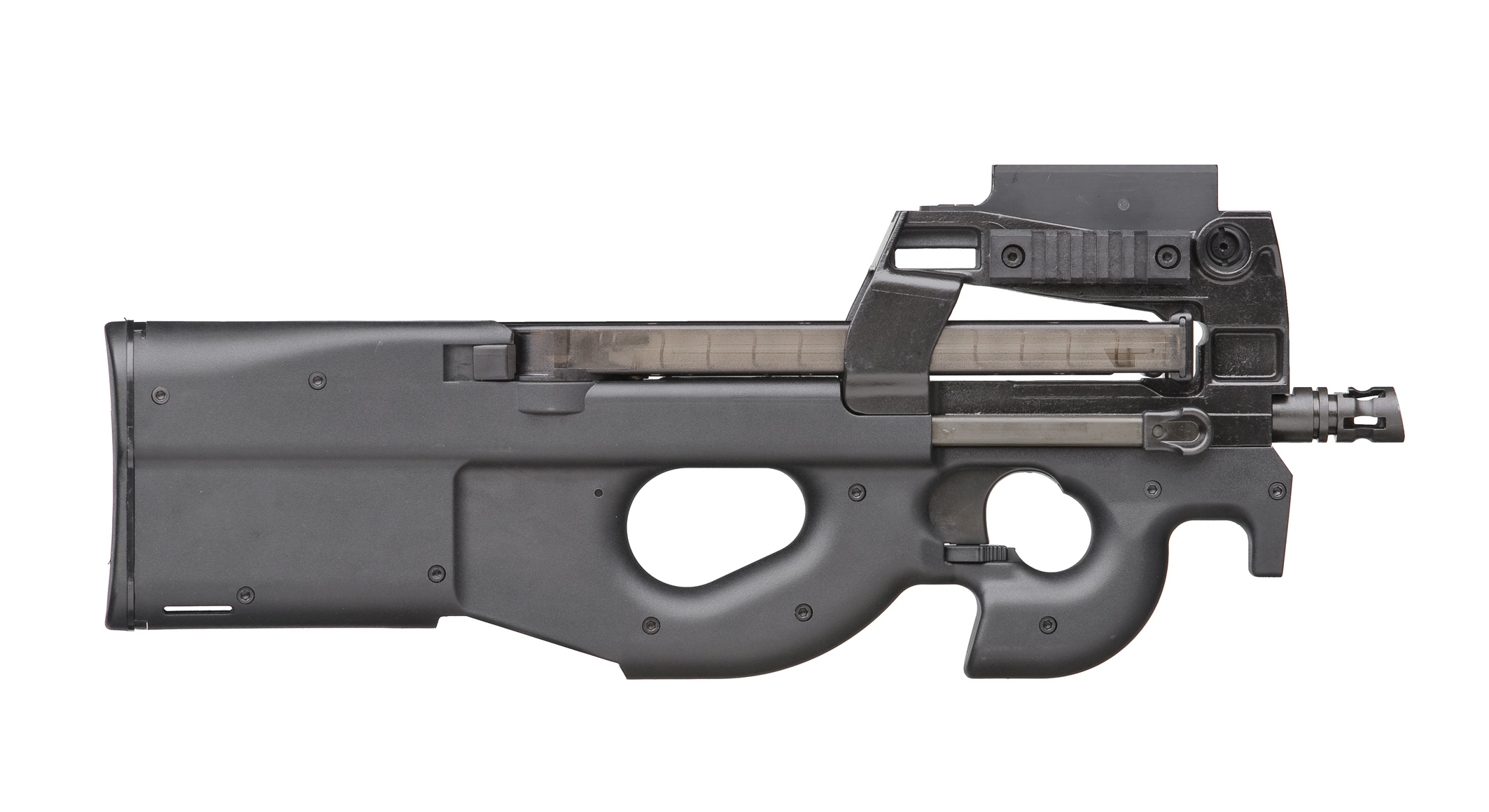
The P90 is fully ambidextrous

The P90 requires minimal maintenance, and it can be disassembled quickly and easily. It is a modular firearm, consisting of four main component groups: the barrel and optical sight group, the moving parts group, the frame and trigger group, and the hammer group. The P90's barrel is cold hammer-forged and chrome-lined, with an overall length of 263 mm (10.4 in). The barrel has eight rifling grooves with a right-hand twist rate of 1:231 mm (1:9.1 in), and it is equipped with a diagonally cut flash suppressor that also acts as a recoil compensator. The stated service life of the barrel is 20,000 rounds.

The P90 uses an internal hammer striking mechanism and a trigger mechanism with a three-position rotary dial fire control selector, located at the foot of the trigger. The dial has three settings: S – safe, 1 – semi-automatic fire, and A – fully automatic fire. When set on A, the P90's fire selector provides a two-stage trigger operation similar to that of the Steyr AUG assault rifle—pulling the trigger back slightly produces semi-automatic fire, and pulling the trigger fully to the rear produces fully automatic fire.

=== Ammunition ===
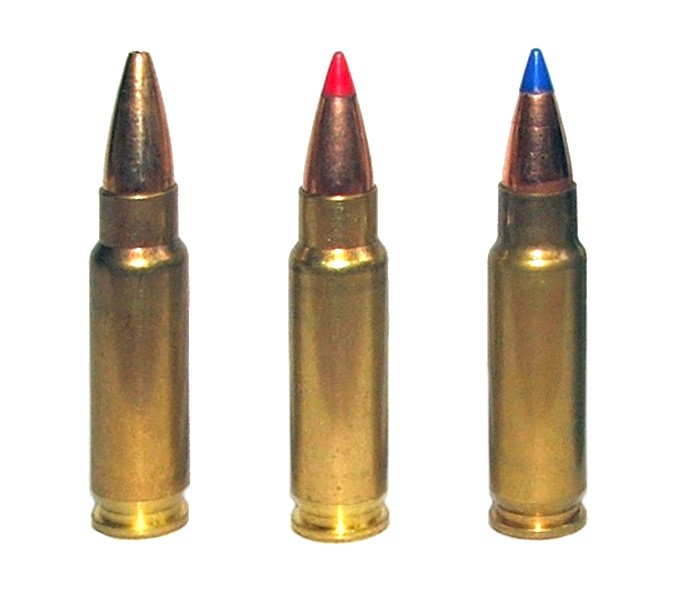
Three of the small-caliber, high-velocity 5.7×28mm cartridges as used in the P90. The left cartridge has a plain hollow tip, the center cartridge has a red plastic V-max tip, and the right cartridge has a blue plastic V-max tip

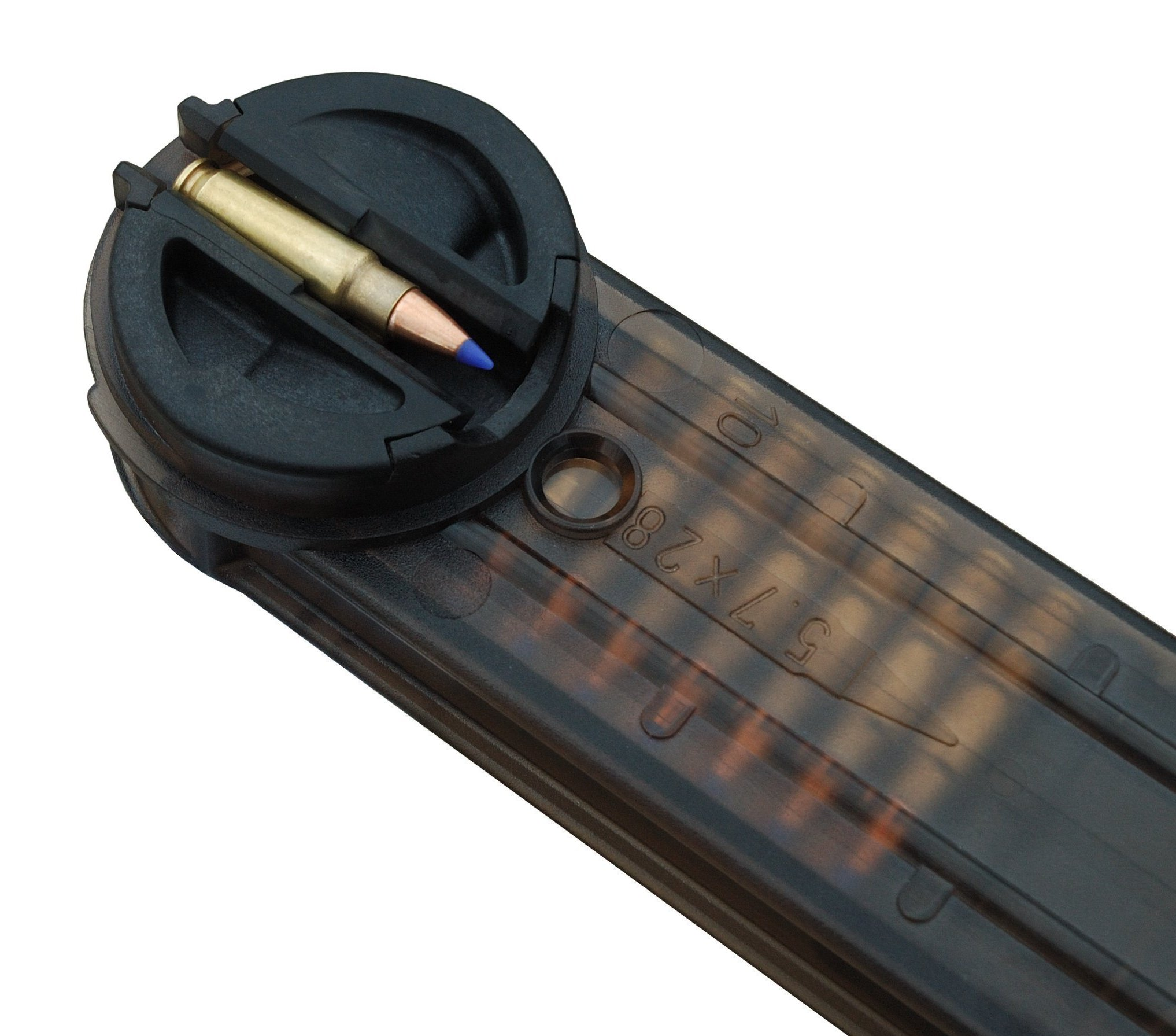
The P90 magazine feed lips

Particularly significant to the design of the P90 is the small-caliber, high-velocity bottlenecked cartridge it uses. The 5.7×28mm cartridge was created by FN Herstal in response to a NATO requirement that called for a replacement for the 9×19mm Parabellum cartridge, which is commonly used in pistols and submachine guns. The 5.7×28mm cartridge weighs 6.0 g (93 grains)—roughly half as much as a typical 9×19mm cartridge—allowing the same number of rounds to be carried for less weight, or allowing more rounds to be carried for the same weight. Since the 5.7×28mm cartridge has a relatively small diameter, an unusually high number of cartridges can be contained in a magazine. The cartridge has a loud report and produces considerable muzzle flash (when fired from a pistol), but it produces roughly 30 percent less recoil than the 9×19mm cartridge, improving controllability. Due to its high velocity, the 5.7×28mm exhibits an exceptionally flat trajectory compared to typical pistol ammunition.

Fired from the P90, the 5.7×28mm SS190 has a muzzle velocity of roughly 716 m/s (2,350 ft/s; Mach 2.1). FN states an effective range of 200 m (220 yd) and a maximum range of 1,800 m (2,000 yd) for the 5.7×28mm cartridge when fired from the P90.

In testing conducted by the Royal Canadian Mounted Police (RCMP) in 1999, the SS190 fired from the P90 at a distance of 25 m (27 yd) exhibited an average penetration depth of 25 cm (9.8 in) in ballistic gelatin covered with a Level II vest. The SS190 exhibited penetration depths ranging from 28 to 34 cm (11 to 13.5 in) when fired from the P90 into bare ballistic gelatin, in tests conducted by Houston Police Department SWAT.

The lightweight of the round also reduces recoil and improves accuracy when firing the weapon. However, some are skeptical of the bullet's terminal performance, and it is a subject of debate among civilian shooters in the United States.

Since the SS190 projectile does not rely on fragmentation or the expansion of a hollow point, the cartridge (and 5.7×28mm weapons) is considered suitable for military use under the Hague Convention of 1899, which prohibits the use of expanding bullets in warfare.

Ballistic performance summary for various 5.7×28mm cartridges
Cartridge type	SS195LF	SS197SR	EA Protector	EA Varmintor	EA Ultra Raptor
Projectile weight	1.8 g (28 gr)	2.6 g (40 gr)	2.6 g (40 gr)	2.3 g (36 gr)	1.8 g (28 gr)
Muzzle velocity	777 m/s (2,550 ft/s)	640 m/s (2,100 ft/s)	717 m/s (2,351 ft/s)	747 m/s (2,452 ft/s)	930 m/s (3,060 ft/s)
Muzzle energy	550 J (410 ft⋅lb)	530 J (390 ft⋅lb)	665 J (491 ft⋅lb)	651 J (481 ft⋅lb)	789 J (582 ft⋅lb)

=== Feeding ===
The P90 uses a unique horizontally mounted feeding system—patented in the United States—that contributes to the weapon's compact profile and unusual appearance. U.S. Patent 4,905,394 ("Top mounted longitudinal magazine") was awarded in 1990, naming René Predazzer as the sole inventor. The detachable box magazine is mounted parallel to the P90's barrel, fitting flush with the top of the weapon's frame, and it contains 50 rounds of ammunition which lie in two rows facing left, offset 90° from the bore axis. As the cartridges are pushed back by spring pressure and arrive at the rear end of the magazine, they are fed as a single row into a spiral feed ramp and rotated 90 degrees, aligning them with the chamber. The magazine body is composed of polymer, and it is translucent to allow the shooter to see the amount of ammunition remaining at any time.

=== Sights and accessories ===
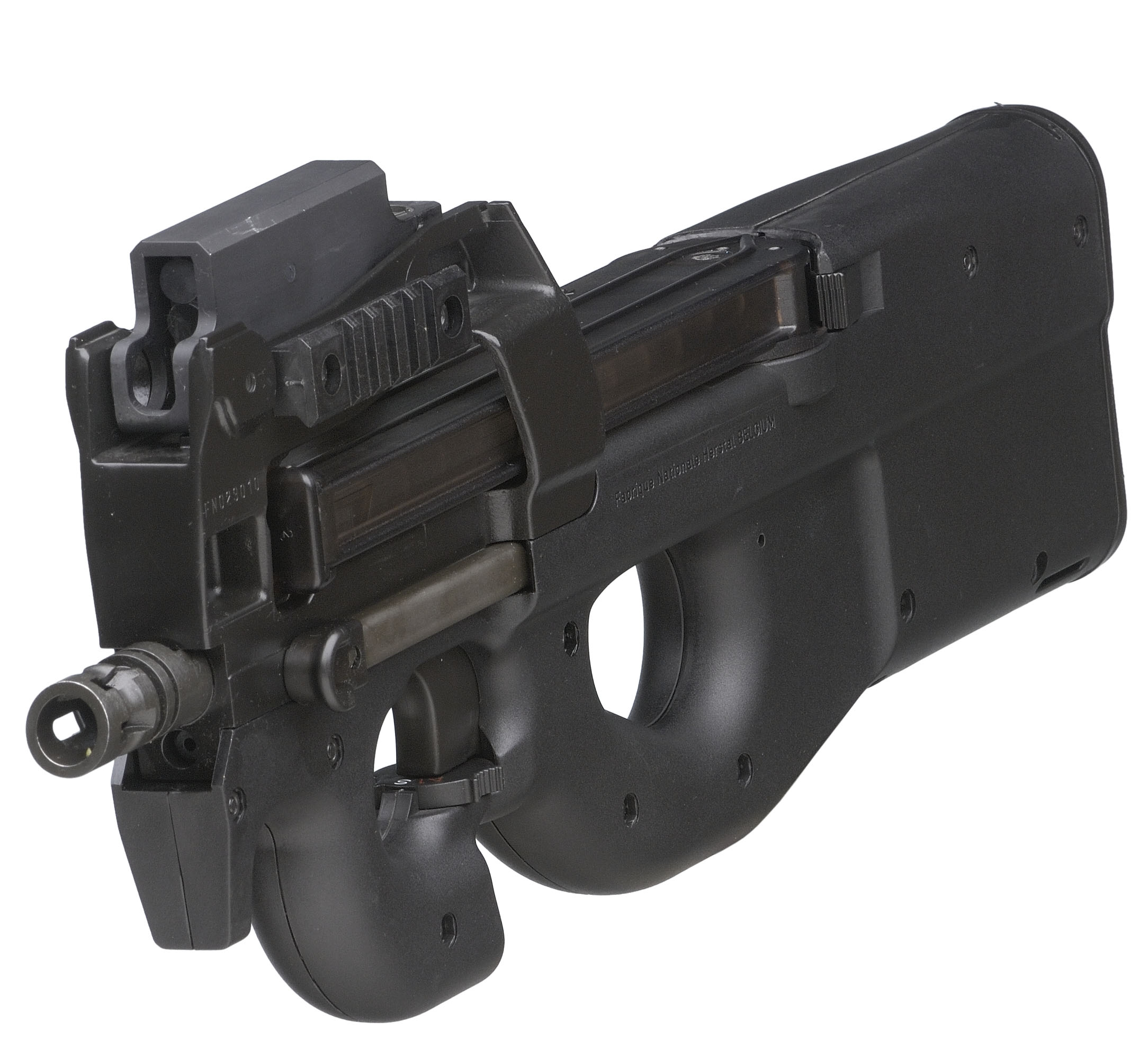
P90 Standard with reflex sight and accessory rail

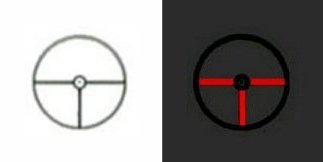
The normal and low-light reticles of the USG reflex sight used on the FN P90 / PS90 USG models. The USG reflex sight has a black T-shaped reticle with tritium elements that glow red and are visible in dim lighting

The P90 was originally equipped with the Ring Sights HC-14-62 reflex sight, but the current weapon is instead fitted with the Ring Sights MC-10-80 sight, which was specifically designed for it. The HC-14-62 has a polymer housing and uses a forward-aimed fiber optic collector to illuminate the white daytime reticle, which consists of a large circle of about 180 minutes of arc (MOA), with a 20 MOA circle surrounding a 3.5 MOA dot in the center. The MC-10-80 has an anodized aluminium housing, and has a similar black reticle. The night reticle for both the HC-14-62 and the MC-10-80 consists of an open T that is primarily illuminated by a tritium module, and, in the HC-14-62, ambient light drawn in by an upward-facing collector. The sight is adjustable for both windage and elevation, and it can be used in conjunction with night vision equipment. As backup in case the reflex sight is damaged, a set of fixed iron sights is provided on each side of the reflex sight housing. The newest MC-10-80, designated as the MC-10-80 Electronic, no longer uses tritium for its night reticle. Instead, the normal reticle can be illuminated in green powered by a CR2032 battery, with eight different brightness settings. The illuminated reticle makes the sight more versatile in a variety of different conditions.

The P90 has provisions for mounting a variety of different types of accessories, including tactical lights and laser aiming devices. A sling can be attached to the P90 for greater ease of carry, or it can be fitted with various sound suppressors such as the Gemtech SP90, which was designed specifically for the weapon in cooperation with FN Herstal. This stainless steel suppressor with a black oxide finish is built according to MIL-SPECs, including saltwater corrosion resistance. It has a length of 184 mm (7.2 in), a diameter of 35 mm (1.4 in) and a weight of 680 g (1.50 lb). When subsonic ammunition is used in conjunction with the suppressor, it reduces the sound signature of the P90 by 33 dB. A small case collector pouch for the P90 is available which fits over the ejection port and collects spent cases as they are ejected downward; the pouch will collect up to one hundred cases before filling.

== Variants ==
=== P90 ===
==== P90 TR ====
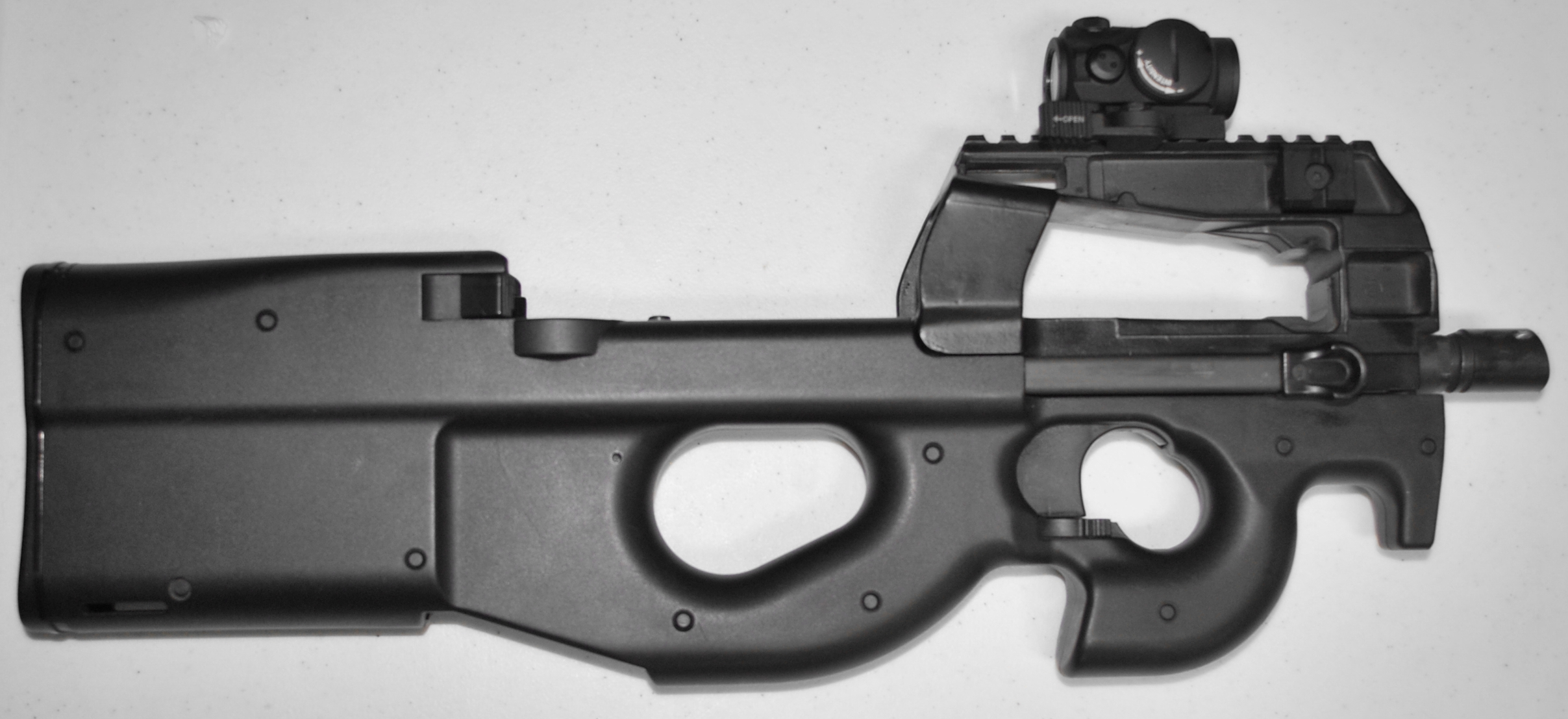
P90 TR (Triple Rail) model, which features a Picatinny rail system for mounting accessories, equipped with an Aimpoint red dot sight.

The P90 TR (Triple Rail) model, also known as the "flat-top," was introduced in late 1999. It features a receiver-mounted triple MIL-STD-1913 (Picatinny) rail interface system, or "Triple Rail," for mounting accessories. Also, instead of the integrated reflex sight, this model uses standard tritium iron sights. There is one full-length accessory rail integrated into the top of the receiver, and two rail stumps are included on the sides of the receiver. The top rail will accept various optical sights with no tools or additional mounting hardware required, and the side rails serve to mount secondary accessories, such as tactical lights or laser aiming devices.

==== P90 USG ====
The P90 USG (United States Government) model is similar to the standard P90, except the reflex sight housing is aluminium, and the sight has a revised reticle. The black reticle consists of a tiny dot inside of a small ring, which is joined by three posts that glow red in low light conditions due to tritium-illumination. The USG reflex sight can be removed and replaced with a special MIL-STD-1913 (Picatinny) rail mount for attaching a different sight.

==== P90 Laserex models ====
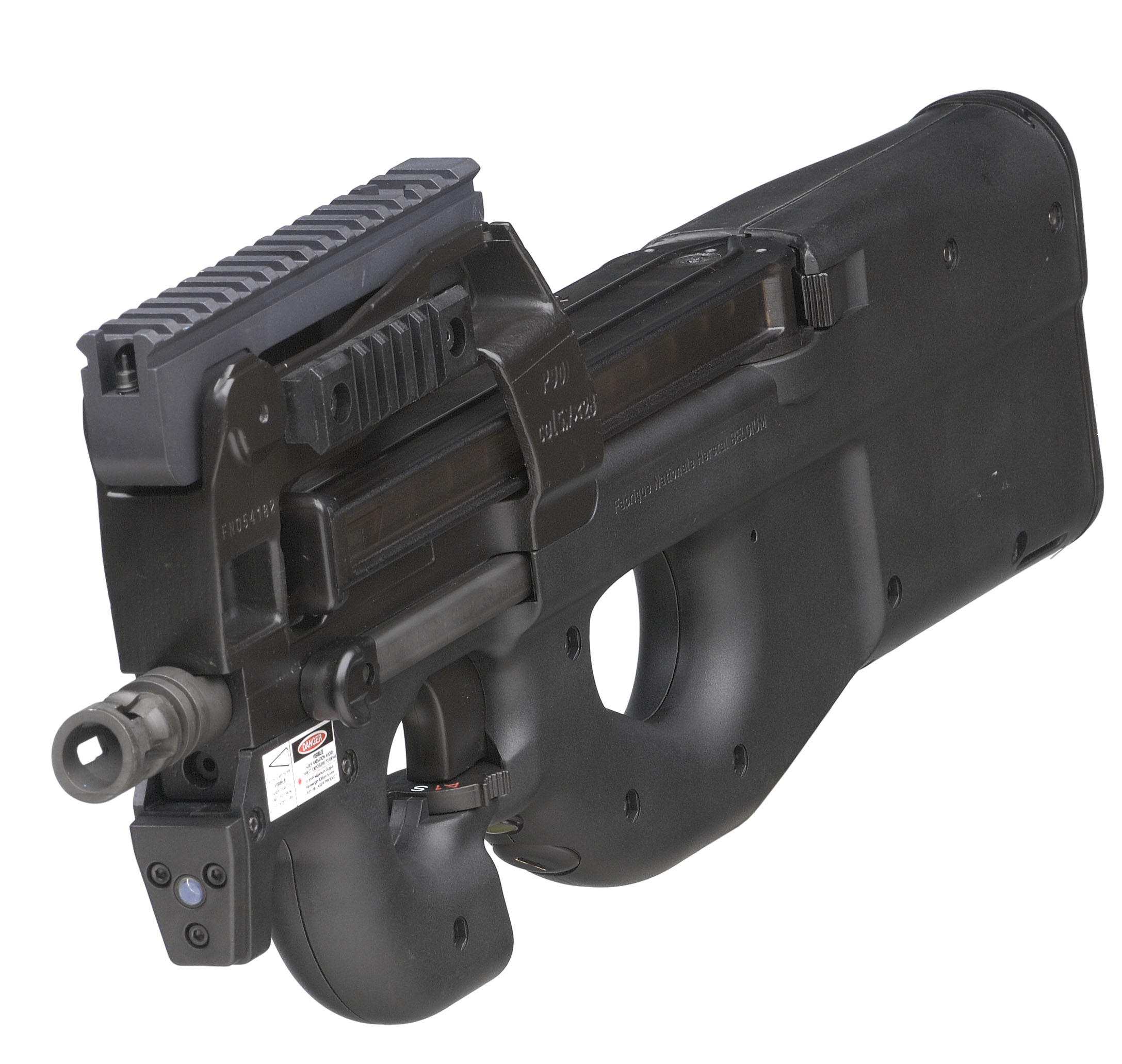
P90 LV with integrated laser aiming module from Laserex. The output end of the laser aiming module is visible below the muzzle. This example is also equipped with a Picatinny accessory Tri Rail.

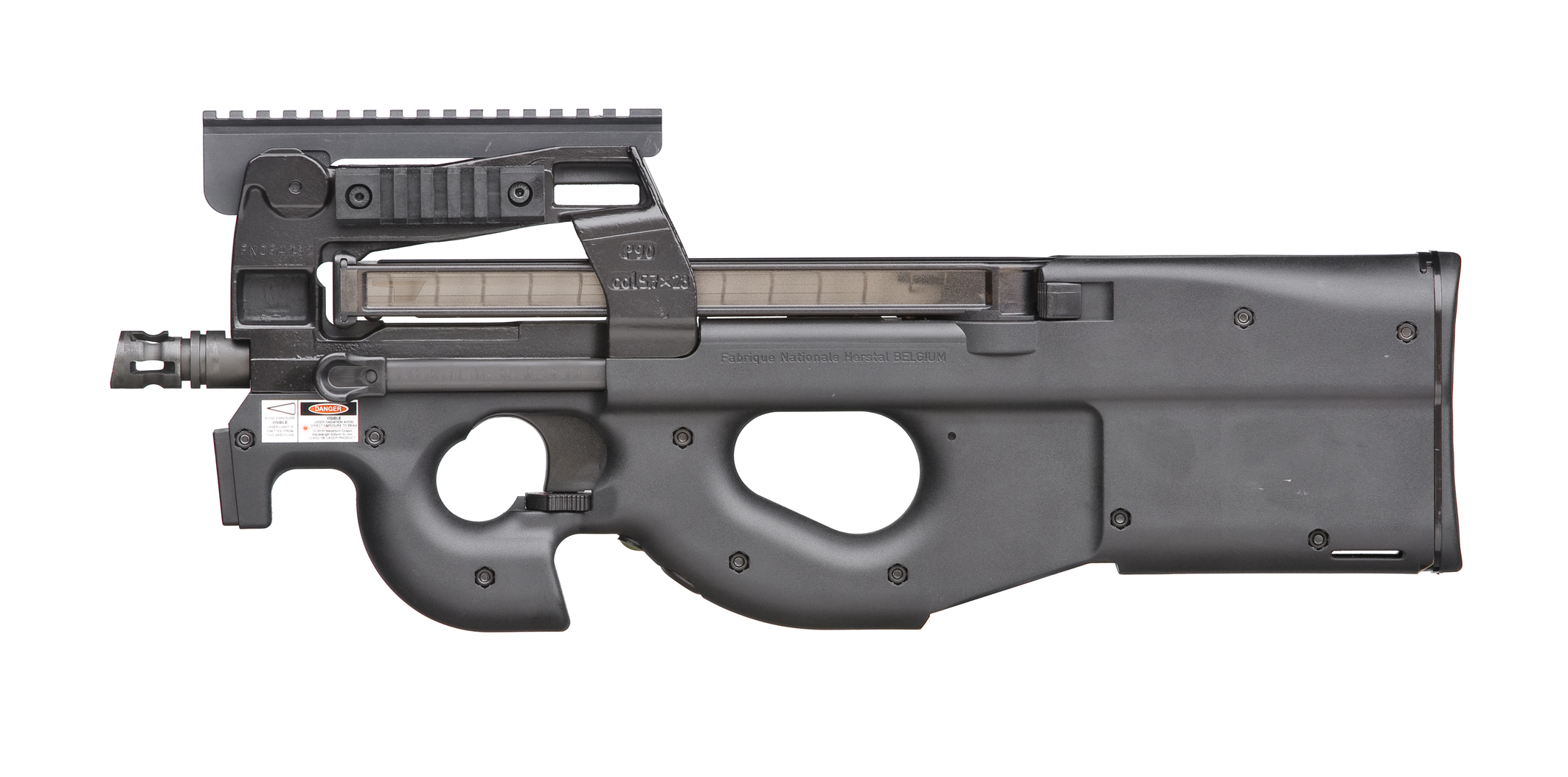
P90 LV

The P90 LV (Laser Visible) and P90 IR (InfraRed) models, both of which were introduced in late 1995, have an integrated laser sight manufactured by Laserex Technologies in Australia. The P90 LV model projects an 8 mW visible laser intended to be used as a low-light shooting aid or for dissuasive effect, while the P90 IR model projects a 4.5 mW infrared laser that can only be seen with night vision equipment. Both laser systems are compact, consisting of a small, flat panel integrated into the front end of the weapon's frame.

The Laserex P90 laser systems have a weight of 131 grams (0.289 lb; 4.6 oz), and they are activated by means of a green pressure switch located on the underside of the weapon's pistol grip. The lasers can be configured for three different internal settings: Off – disabled to prevent accidental activation, Training – low intensity for eye safety and extended battery life in training, or Combat – high intensity for maximum visibility. The Laserex P90 laser systems have a battery life of 250 hours when used on the Training setting, or a life of 50 hours when used on the Combat setting.

=== PS90 ===
The PS90 is a semi-automatic carbine variant of the P90, intended for civilian shooters for personal protection and sporting use; it was introduced in 2005, and continues to be offered in several configurations. The PS90 will accept the standard 50-round P90 magazines, but the gun is supplied with a magazine that is blocked to a capacity of 10 or 30 rounds, allowing it to be sold in jurisdictions where magazine capacities are restricted by law.

In order to be legal for purchase by civilians without obtaining a tax stamp for a Short Barreled Rifle (SBR) as defined by the United States National Firearms Act, the PS90 carbine has an extended 407 mm (16.0 in) barrel and is semi-automatic, with a trigger pull of approximately 31–36 newtons (7.0–8.1 lb_{f}). The lengthened barrel has eight rifling grooves, with a right-hand twist rate of 1:229 mm (1:9 in) and a rifled length of 376 mm (14.8 in); the muzzle is equipped with a fixed "birdcage" type flash suppressor.

Despite the added barrel length, the PS90 is relatively compact and lightweight, with an overall length of 667 mm (26.3 in), and a weight of 3.4 kg (7.5 lb) with a fully loaded 50-round magazine. Due to the added barrel length, the PS90 can achieve a muzzle velocity of up to 777 metres per second (2,550 ft/s) with SS195LF ammunition, or up to 930 metres per second (3,100 ft/s) with third-party ammunition.

==== PS90 Standard ====
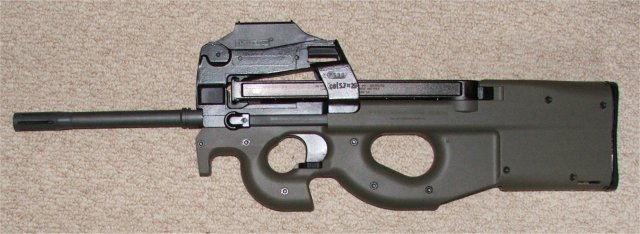
PS90 Standard

The PS90 Standard is the current model of the PS90 offered by FN Herstal. It features a MIL-STD-1913 (Picatinny) rail fitted to the top of the receiver, which allows the shooter to mount their preferred optical sight. The rail includes a set of integrated iron sights, as backup in case the primary sight is damaged. As of 2019 the PS90 Standard is available with a black frame.

==== PS90 SBR ====
The PS90 SBR variant is functionally identical to the “PS90 Standard”, but instead of the extended 16 inch barrel, this variant retains the standard 10.5 inch barrel of its selective-fire counterpart, thus making it the ballistic equivalent, in semi-automatic only form. The PS90 SBR is not usually listed on FN Herstal's website, but is offered commercially through third-party extensions. These are made either through factory standard layouts, or conversions made by swapping the barrel. This renders the weapon a “short barreled rifle”, and thus the required tax stamp is necessary in order to purchase and/or transfer it. The weapon is regulated as “Title II”, and special certification is required in most states. As with all factory standard PS90 receivers special welding is in place to complicate full auto conversion.

==== PS90 TR ====
The PS90 TR is now discontinued. It featured a "Triple Rail" receiver assembly identical to that of the P90 TR. The top of the receiver consisted of an MIL-STD-1913 (Picatinny) rail, allowing the shooter to mount their preferred optical sight. Two polymer side rails—one on each side of the receiver—were included for mounting secondary accessories, such as lasers or tactical lights. Like the PS90 Standard, the PS90 TR was available with either an olive drab or black frame. As of 2013, the PS90 TR model is no longer listed by FNH USA.

==== PS90 USG ====
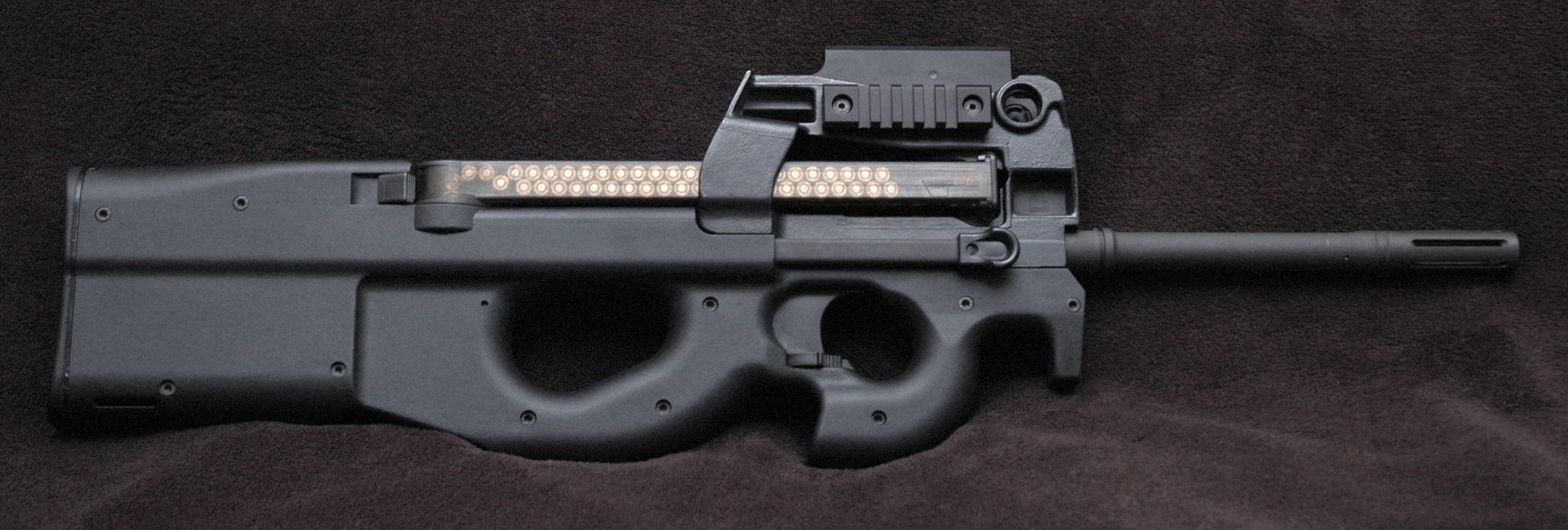
The matte black PS90 USG model.

The PS90 USG is now discontinued. In the same fashion as the P90 USG, this model had an aluminium reflex sight housing with a revised reticle. The black reticle consisted of a tiny dot inside of a small ring, which was joined by three posts that glowed red in low light conditions due to tritium-illumination. The USG reflex sight could be removed and replaced with a special MIL-STD-1913 (Picatinny) rail mount for attaching a different sight, and like other models of the PS90, the USG was available with either an olive drab or black frame.

As of 2011, the PS90 USG model is no longer listed by FNH USA, and the USG reflex sight is not offered anymore.

== Users ==
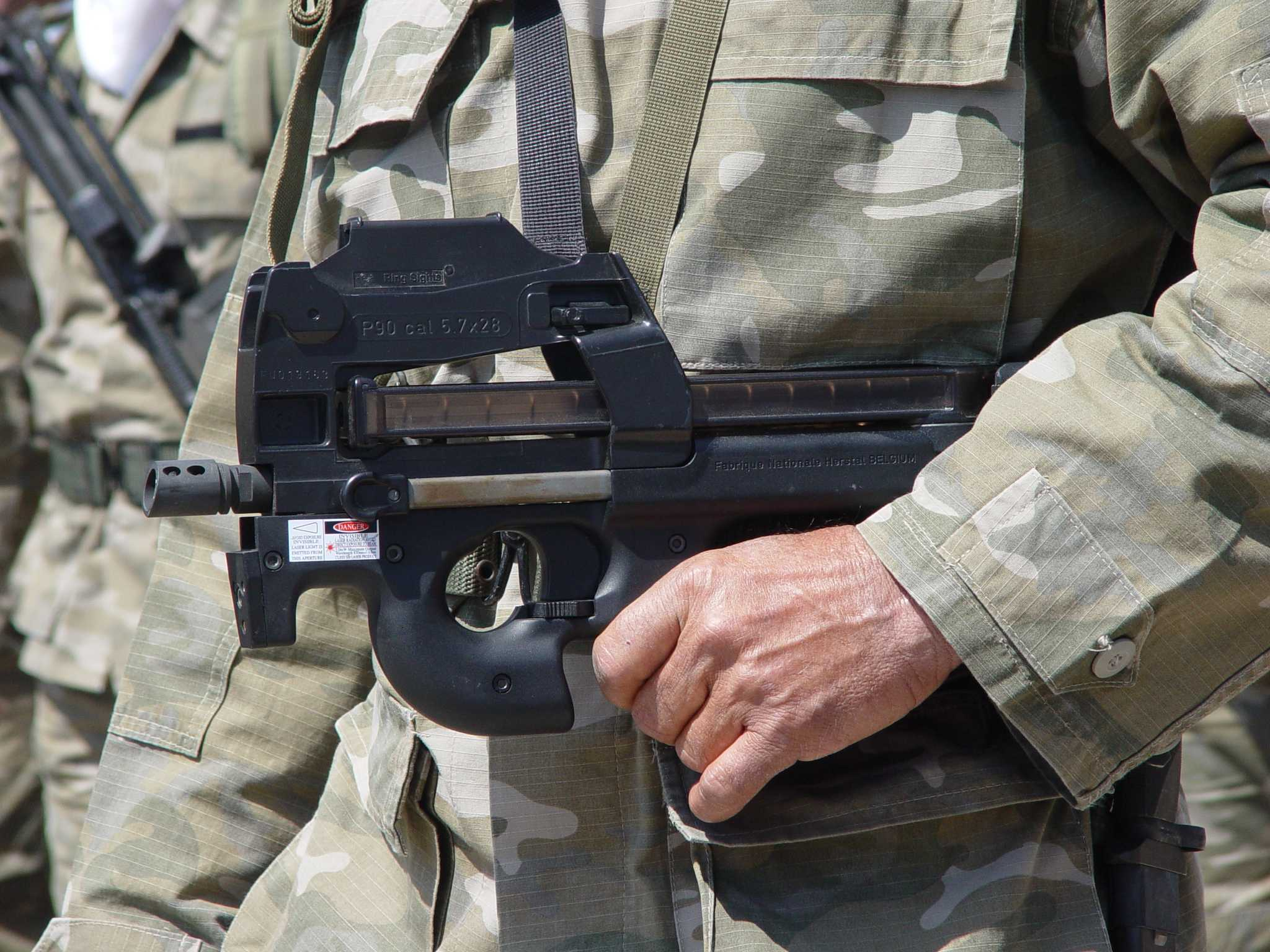
The Cypriot National Guard purchased 350 P90s in 2000.

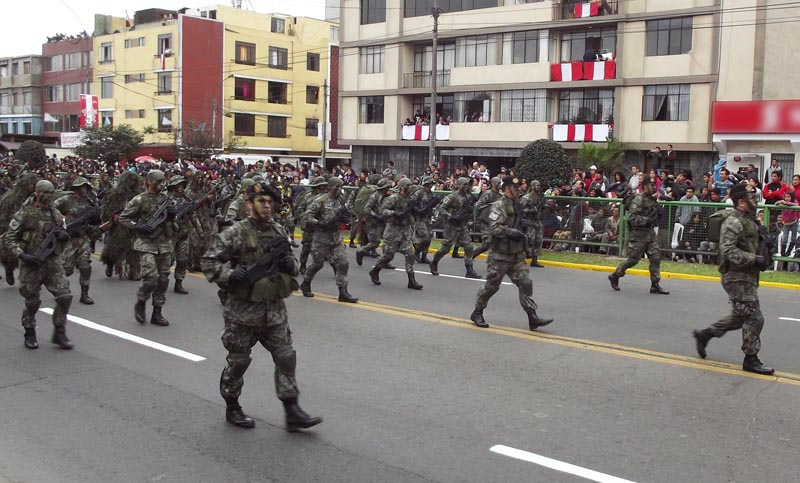
Peruvian special forces carrying P90s during a military parade in 2012

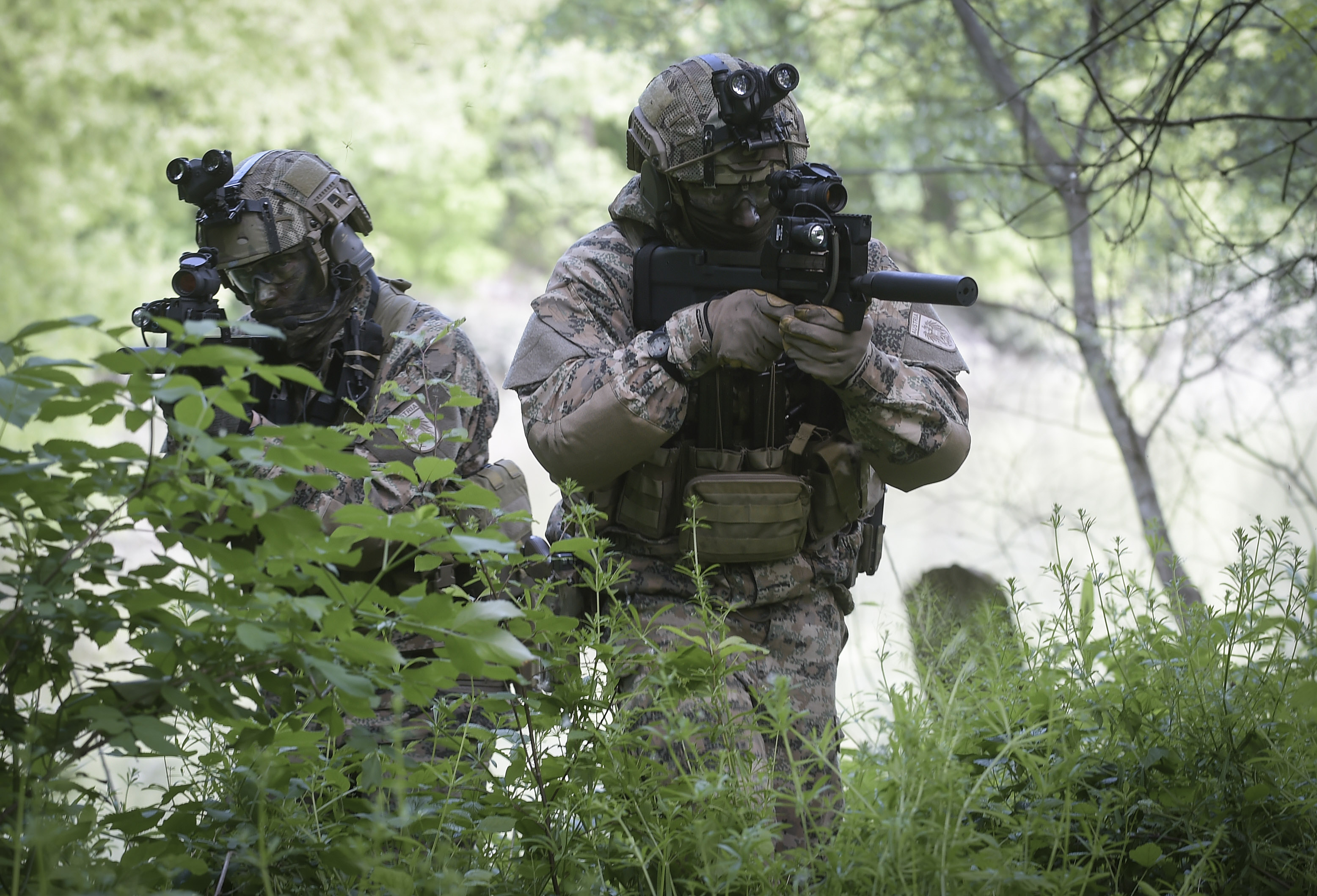
Austrian soldiers armed with P90s during a training exercise

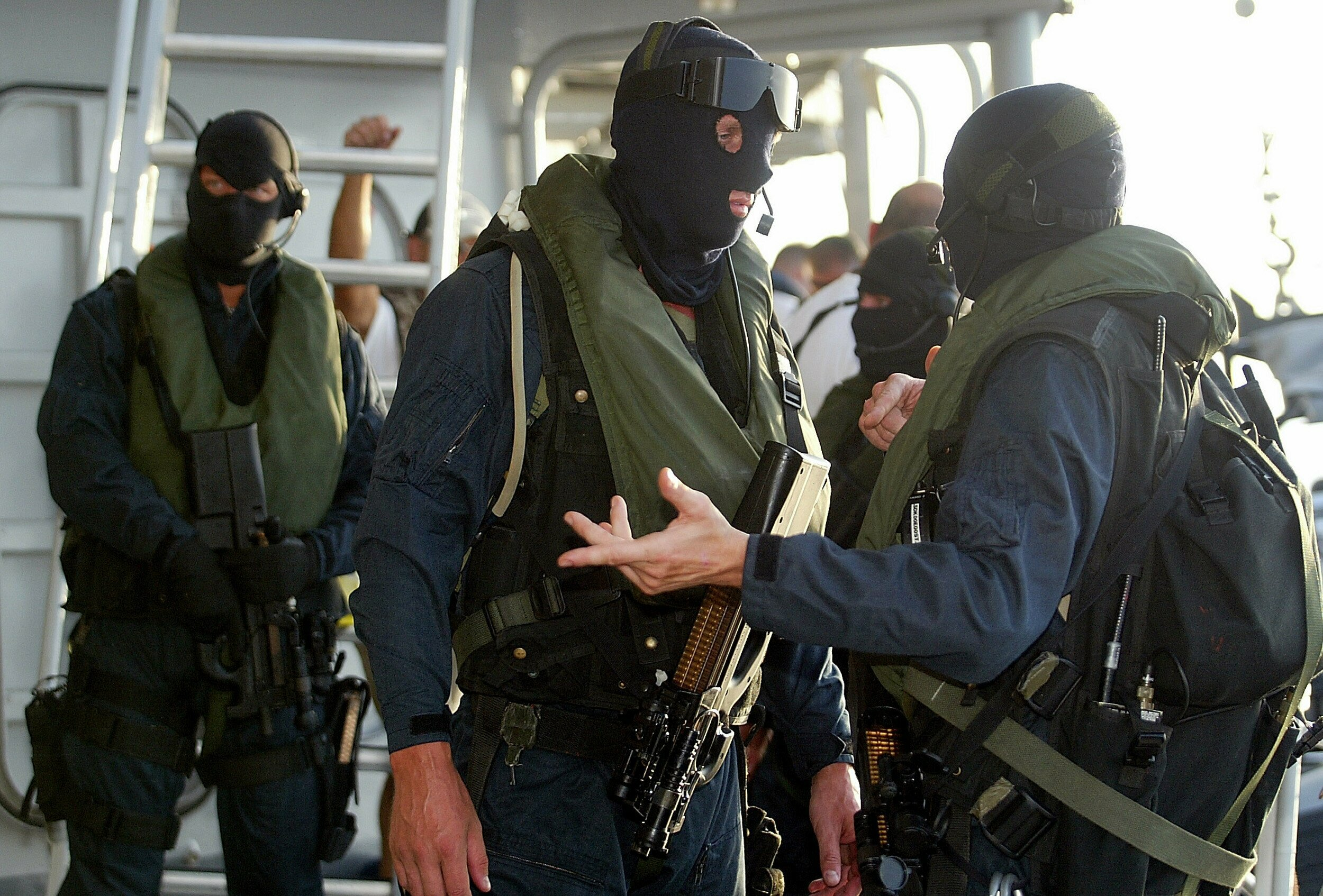
A Dutch boarding team armed with P90s operating in the Gulf of Oman from the frigate HNLMS Van Galen (F834).

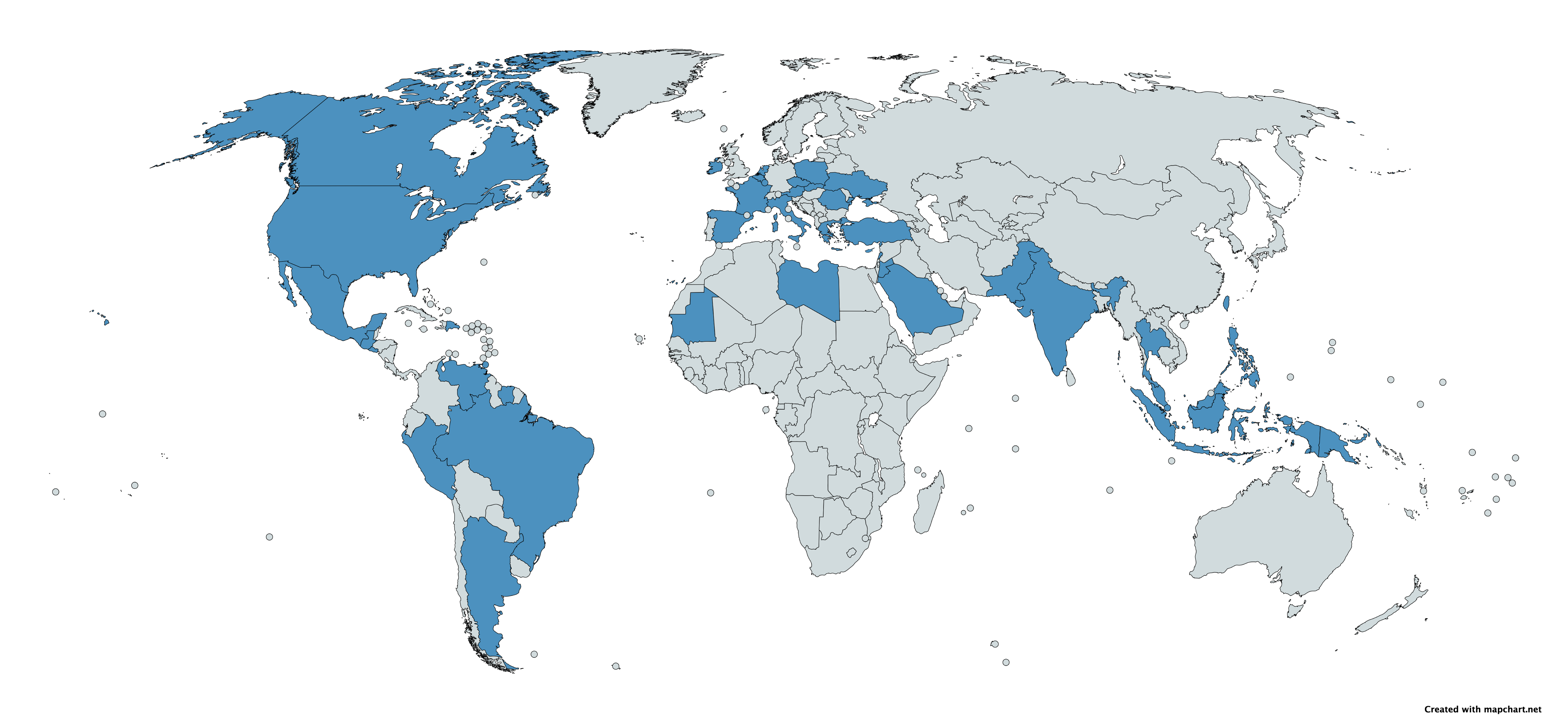
A map with P90 users in blue

Despite being originally intended as a defensive weapon for military personnel whose primary role is not fighting with small arms (such as vehicle drivers), most sales of the P90 have been to special forces and counter-terrorist groups who use it for offensive roles.

In 1997, suppressed P90s were used in combat by the Peruvian special forces group (Grupo de Fuerzas Especiales) in Operation Chavín de Huantar, the hostage rescue siege that ended the Japanese embassy hostage crisis. The operation was a success: all 14 MRTA revolutionaries were killed, and 71 hostages were rescued. The MRTA revolutionaries who had taken the hostages were equipped with body armor, but it was defeated by the Peruvian special forces' P90s. In 2011, P90s were used by Muammar Gaddafi's military forces in the 2011 Libyan civil war, and some of these examples were captured and used in the war by Libyan rebel forces.

By 2009, the P90 was in service with military and police forces in over 40 countries. In the United States, the Houston Police Department was the first local law enforcement agency to adopt the P90, acquiring it for their SWAT team in 1999. In 2003, the Houston SWAT team became one of the first agencies in the country to use the weapon in a shootout. By 2009, the P90 was in use with over 200 law enforcement agencies in the United States, including the Secret Service and Federal Protective Service. In response, the National Rifle Association of America (NRA) added the P90 and PS90 to its NRA Tactical Police Competition standards, allowing law enforcement agencies to compete in the event using either weapon.

Country/Territory	Organization	Model	Quantity	Date	Reference
Argentina	Agrupación de Buzos Tácticos tactical diver group of the Argentine Navy	P90	−	−	
Argentina	Policía de Seguridad Aeroportuaria (PSA; Airport Security Police)	P90	−	−	
Argentina	Grupo Alacrán special group of the Argentine National Gendarmerie	P90	−	−	
Austria	Jagdkommando (Jakdo) special group of the Austrian Army	P90, P90 TR	140	−	
Austria	Kommando Militärstreife & Militärpolizei (Kdo MilStrf&MP) close protection teams	P90 TR	−	−	
Belgium	Marinecomponent/Composante Marine (Belgian Navy) commandos	−	−	−	
Belgium	Landcomponent/Composante Terre (Belgian Army), replacing the Uzi	−	−	2004–	
Belgium	Détachement d'Agents de Sécurité (DAS) dignitary protection group	P90	53	−	
Belgium	Directorate of Special Units (DSU) group of the Federale Politie/Police Fédérale/Föderale Polizei	−	−	−	
Belgium	Former Gendarmerie/Rijkswacht paramilitary police force	P90	114	−	
Belgium	Aarschot municipal police force	P90	−	−	
Belgium	Liège metropolitan police force (replacing the Uzi)	−	−	2002–	
Belgium	Zone de Police Boraine (Boussu/Colfontaine/Frameries/Quaregnon/Saint-Ghislain municipalities) police force	P90 TR	−	−	
Brazil	Batalhão de Operações Policiais Especiais (BOPE) of the Military Police of Rio de Janeiro State	−	−	−	
Canada	Joint Task Force 2 (JTF2) special group of the CAF Special Operations Forces Command	−	−	2005–	
Canada	Halifax Regional Police force in Halifax Regional Municipality, Nova Scotia	−	−	−	
Canada	Service de police de la Ville de Montréal (SPVM) SWAT in Montreal, Quebec	−	−	−	
Cyprus	Εθνική Φρουρά (Cypriot National Guard) special forces	P90	350	2000–	
Czech Republic	Útvar rychlého nasazení (URNA) of the Czech National Police	P90	−	2000s–	
Dominican Republic	Cuerpo de Ayudantes Militares del Presidente de la República	−	−	−	
Dominican Republic	Dominican Republic's counter-terrorist group	−	150	2002–	
Dominican Republic	Fuerzas Armadas de la República Dominicana (Military of the Dominican Republic)	−	−	−	
El Salvador	Comando Especial Antiterrorista (CEAT)	−	350	2002–	
France	Commandement des Opérations Spéciales (COS) joint special operations command	−	−	−	
France	GIGN counter-terrorism group of the Gendarmerie Nationale	P90 TR	−	−	
France	RAID counter-terrorism group of the Police Nationale	−	−	−	
Greece	Ειδική Κατασταλτική Αντιτρομοκρατική Μονάδα (EKAM) unit of the Hellenic Police	−	−	−	
Guatemala	Secretaría de Asuntos Administrativos de Seguridad de la Presidencia (SAAS)	P90	20	2009–	
India	Special Protection Group (SPG; tasked with protection of the prime minister) and the Special Group (India) of Research and Analysis Wing	P90, P90 TR	−	2008–	
Indonesia	Komando Pasukan Katak (Kopaska) tactical diver group of the Indonesian Navy	−	−	−	
Indonesia	Komando Pasukan Khusus (Kopassus) special forces group of the Indonesian Army	−	−	−	
Ireland	Army Ranger Wing special forces of the Irish Defence Forces	−	−	2003–	
Italy	Col Moschin 9^{o} Reggimento d'Assalto Paracadutisti (9th Parachute Assault Regiment) special forces of the Italian Army	P90 TR	−	−	
Jordan	Jordanian Armed Forces	−	−	−	
Lebanon	Forces de Sécurité Intérieure (FSI)	P90	10000	−	
Libya	Military of Libya (used by Muammar Gaddafi's military forces in the 2011 Libyan civil war, and some of these examples were captured and used in the war by Libyan rebel forces)	−	367	2008–	
Luxembourg	Unité Spéciale de la Police (USP) group of the Grand Ducal Police	P90 TR	−	−	
Malaysia	Pasukan Khas Laut (PASKAL) special operations group of the Royal Malaysian Navy	−	−	−	
Mauritania	BASEP presidential security battalion	−	−	−	
Mexico	Ejército Méxicano (Mexican Army) Special Forces	P90	−	−	
Mexico	Estado Mayor Presidencial (EMP; Presidential Guard)	−	−	−	
Mexico	Fuerzas Especiales (FES) of the Mexican Navy	−	−	−	
Mexico	Policía Federal (PF; Federal Police) of the Secretaría de Seguridad Pública	−	−	−	
Netherlands	Korps Commandotroepen (KCT) of the Royal Netherlands Army (replacing the Uzi)	P90 TR	−	2000–	
Netherlands	Dienst Speciale Interventies (DSI) of the National Police Corps (Netherlands)	P90 TR	−	2001–	
Netherlands	Brigade Speciale Beveiligingsopdrachten (BSB) of the Dutch Gendarmerie	−	−	−	
Pakistan	Special Services Group	−	−	−	
Papua New Guinea	Papua New Guinea Defence Force (PNGDF)	−	−	−	
Peru	Grupo de Fuerzas Especiales (GRUFE) of the Peruvian Armed Forces	−	−	−	
Peru	Fuerza de Operaciones Especiales (FOES) of the Peruvian Navy	P90	53	−	
Peru	Paracaidistas del Ejército (Peruvian Army paratroopers)	−	−	−	
Philippines	Special Action Force (SAF) of the Philippine National Police Presidential Security Command	−	−	−	
Poland	Jednostka Wojskowa Grom	P90 TR	−	2006–	
Poland	Biuro Ochrony Rządu (used primarily for dignitary protection)	P90	−	2007–	
Portugal	Grupo de Operações Especiais (GOE) of the Polícia de Segurança Pública	−	−	2002–	
Romania	Detașamentul de Intervenție Rapidă special operations group of the Romanian Military	−	−	−	
Saudi Arabia	−	−	−	−	
Singapore	Singapore Armed Forces Commando Formation (CDO FN)	−	−	2002–	
Slovakia	Útvar osobitného určenia of Slovak Police Force	P90	−	−	
Spain	Grupo Especial de Operaciones (GEO) of the Cuerpo Nacional de Policía	P90 TR	−	−	
Spain	Escuadrón de Zapadores Paracaidistas (EZAPAC) special group of the Ejército del Aire (Spanish Air Force)	P90, P90 TR	−	−	
Suriname	Military of Suriname	−	900	2001–	
Taiwan	Republic of China Armed Forces	P90	−	1992–	
Thailand	กองทัพบกไทย (Royal Thai Army) special units	−	−	−	
Trinidad and Tobago	Trinidad and Tobago Defence Force	−	−	−	
Turkey	Karşı Atak Timi, prime minister's close protection teams.	−	−	−	
Turkey	Polis Özel Harekat special operations group of the General Directorate of Security	−	−	−	
Turkey	Jandarma Özel Asayiş Komutanlığı domestic special operations group of the Turkish Gendarmerie	−	−	−	
Ukraine	Ukrainian police force (unspecified)	P90 LV	30	2008–	
United States	U.S. Federal Protective Service branch of the DHS (formerly a branch of ICE)	P90	−	2001–	
United States	U.S. Immigration and Naturalization Service	−	−	−	
United States	Addison police department in Texas (first agency in the country to issue it to patrol cars)	PS90 TR	52	2007–	
United States	U.S. Secret Service	P90 TR	−	1990s–	
United States	Alaska State Troopers	P90 LV	9	−	
United States	Birmingham, Alabama SWAT	P90	−	−	
United States	Bryan, Texas police department SWAT	−	−	−	
United States	Chula Vista, California SWAT	P90 TR	−	−	
United States	Creve Coeur, Missouri police department	−	−	−	
United States	Edina, Minnesota police department	−	11	2005–	
United States	Houston, Texas SWAT (first local law enforcement agency in the country to adopt and use the weapon)	P90	5	1999–	
United States	Kutztown, Pennsylvania police department	−	−	−	
United States	Passaic County, New Jersey SWAT	−	−	2002–	
United States	Richland County, South Carolina SRT	−	−	2000–	
United States	Sioux Falls, South Dakota SWAT	−	−	−	
United States	Sparta Township, New Jersey Police Department	−	−	−	
United States	Zapata County, Texas sheriff's department	−	−	−	
Venezuela	Bodyguards assigned to the Ministerio del Poder Popular para Relaciones Exteriores	−	−	−	
Venezuela	Ejército Bolivariano de Venezuela (Venezuelan Bolivarian Army)	−	−	−	
Venezuela	Various police forces	−	−	−	

== See also ==
- AR-57 (AR platform rifle firing FN 5.7×28mm fed from a 50rd P90 magazine)
- FN Five-seven (5.7×28mm handgun designed by FN Herstal to accompany the P90)
- Kel-Tec P50 (Semi-automatic pistol chambered in FN 5.7×28mm)
- ST Kinetics CPW (multi-caliber SMG/PDW able to be chambered in FN 5.7×28mm)
