= Police Counter Attack Team =

Polis Karşı Atak Timleri Police Counter Attack Teams
- Active: 1970s–present
- Country: Turkey
- Branch: General Directorate of Security
- Type: Police tactical unit
- Role: Close protection, counter-terrorism and law enforcement

The Police Counter Attack Teams (Turkish: Polis Karşı Atak Timleri) or simply CAT is one of the special forces unit of the General Directorate of Security. Unlike the Police Special Operations Department (PÖH), the unit specializes in executive protection.

== Role ==
These teams, established in the 1970s, reinforce the other special forces in the event of a major terrorist incident.

The nature of the team was similar to the SWAT teams of North America, but with greater emphasis on counter-terrorism (CT) training and capability, reportedly to include operations involving hijacked aircraft.

Now, the team changes its role to a close protection unit, which is currently assigned to the protection to the Turkish Prime Minister and President.

== Involvement in attack on protestors ==
On May 16, 2017 fifteen members of the Police Counter Attack Teams were involved in an attack on protestors in Washington, DC and charged with assault by the US Department of Justice. The charges were later dropped.

== Equipment ==
Model	Origin	Type	References
SIG Sauer P226	West Germany	Semi-automatic pistol	
Heckler & Koch MP5	West Germany	Submachine gun	
FN P90	Belgium	Submachine gun	
IMI Micro Uzi	Israel	Submachine gun	
MKE MPT	Turkey	Assault rifle	
SIG SG 556	Switzerland	Assault rifle	
Heckler & Koch HK416	Germany	Assault rifle	
M4 carbine	United States	Assault rifle	
SIG Sauer SIG516	Turkey	Assault rifle	
