= Military Police (Austria) =

Austrian law enforcement service

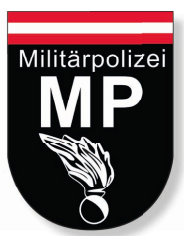
Military police badge

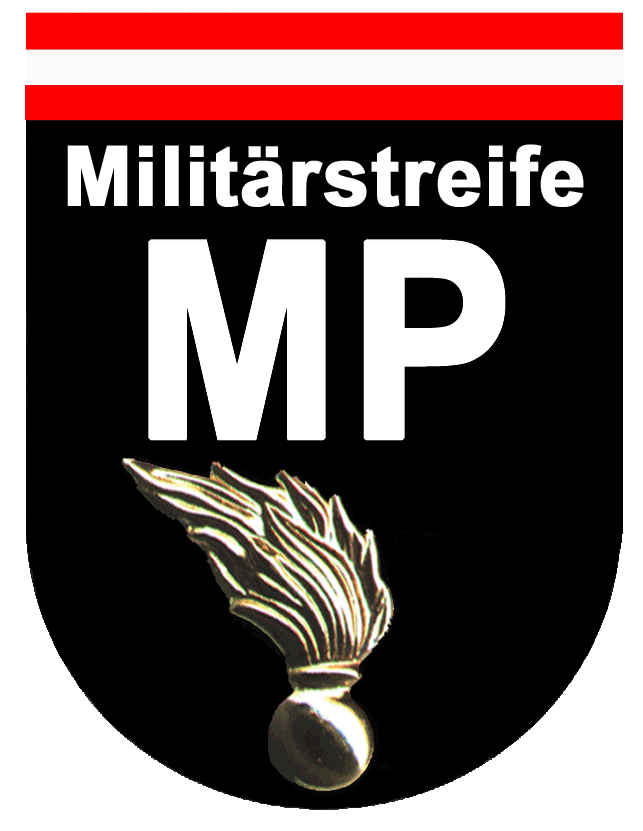
Austrian military patrol badge (until 2019)

The Military Police (German: Militärpolizei) is the branch within the Austrian Armed Forces tasked with law enforcement and the protection of the forces, military events and Austrian Armed Forces property.

Until March 31, 2019 called the Military Patrol and Military Police Command (German: Kommando Militärstreife und Militärpolizei, KdoMilStrf&MP).

== Military Police Command ==
The Austrian MP Command, located in Vienna, consists of the following elements

- Military Police HQ
- Fundamentals Division
- Training Division
- Signal platoon
- Personal protection
- 3 MP Companies
- MP militia

== MP Companies / Locations ==
One MP HQ in Vienna, one in Graz, one in Salzburg, one in Klagenfurt and one in St. Pölten, each composed of the following elements

- HQ element
- Special tasks
- Supply element
- 3 MP platoons

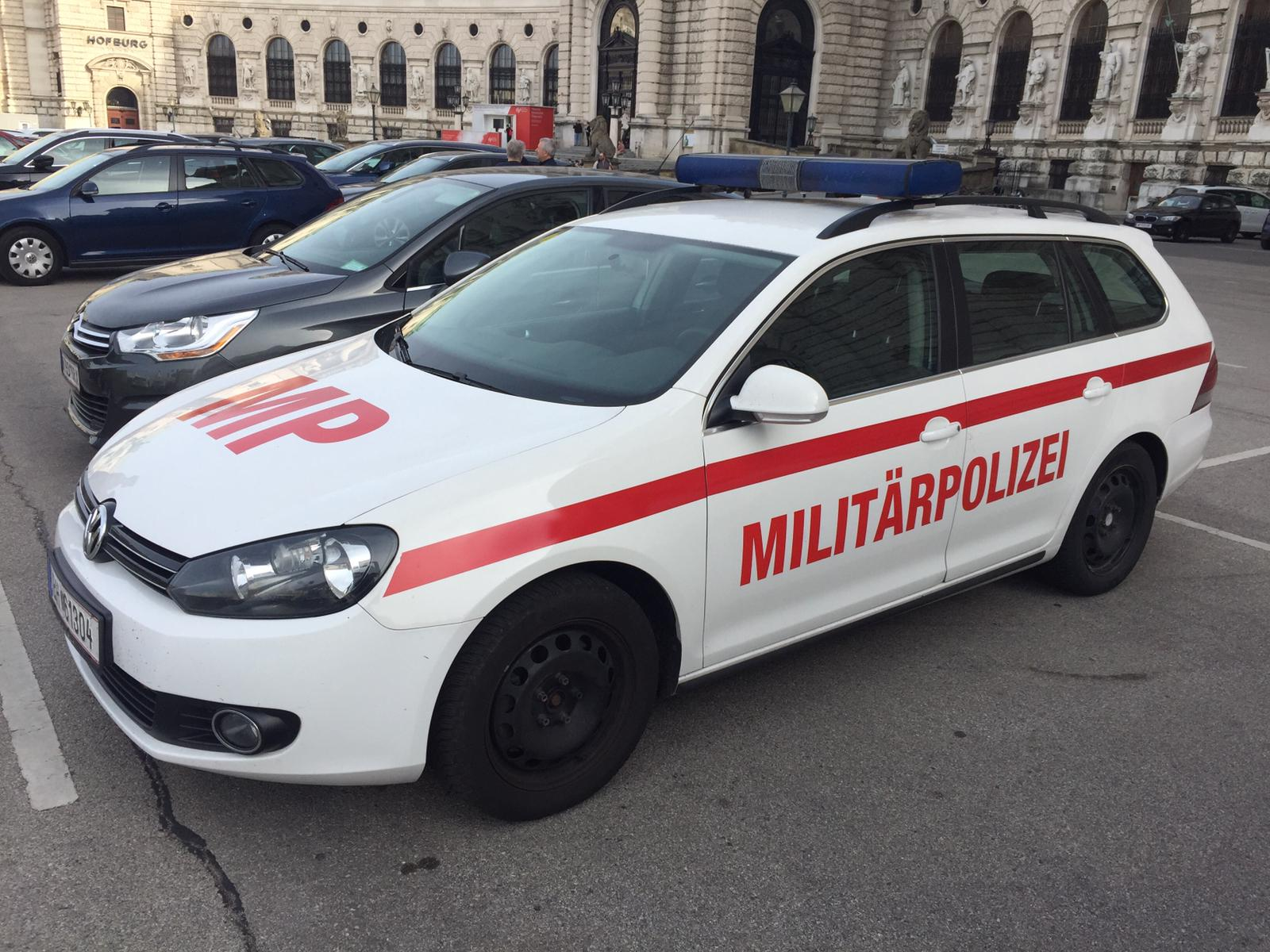
Standard patrol vehicle of the military police

== Tasks ==
Additionally to its traditional domestic tasks, the formation now also fulfills tasks in international operations. In Austria the Military Police is only tasked with internal Armed Forces matters. Abroad, the Military Police is tasked with extensive assignments. It closes the security gap between a conflict that has ended and a functioning society. A large number of experienced specialists and modern equipment are required to meet these demanding tasks.

=== National tasks ===
- Check routines and security checks
- Security duty
- Traffic control
- Personal Protection
- Force Protection
- Law enforcement
- Inquiries

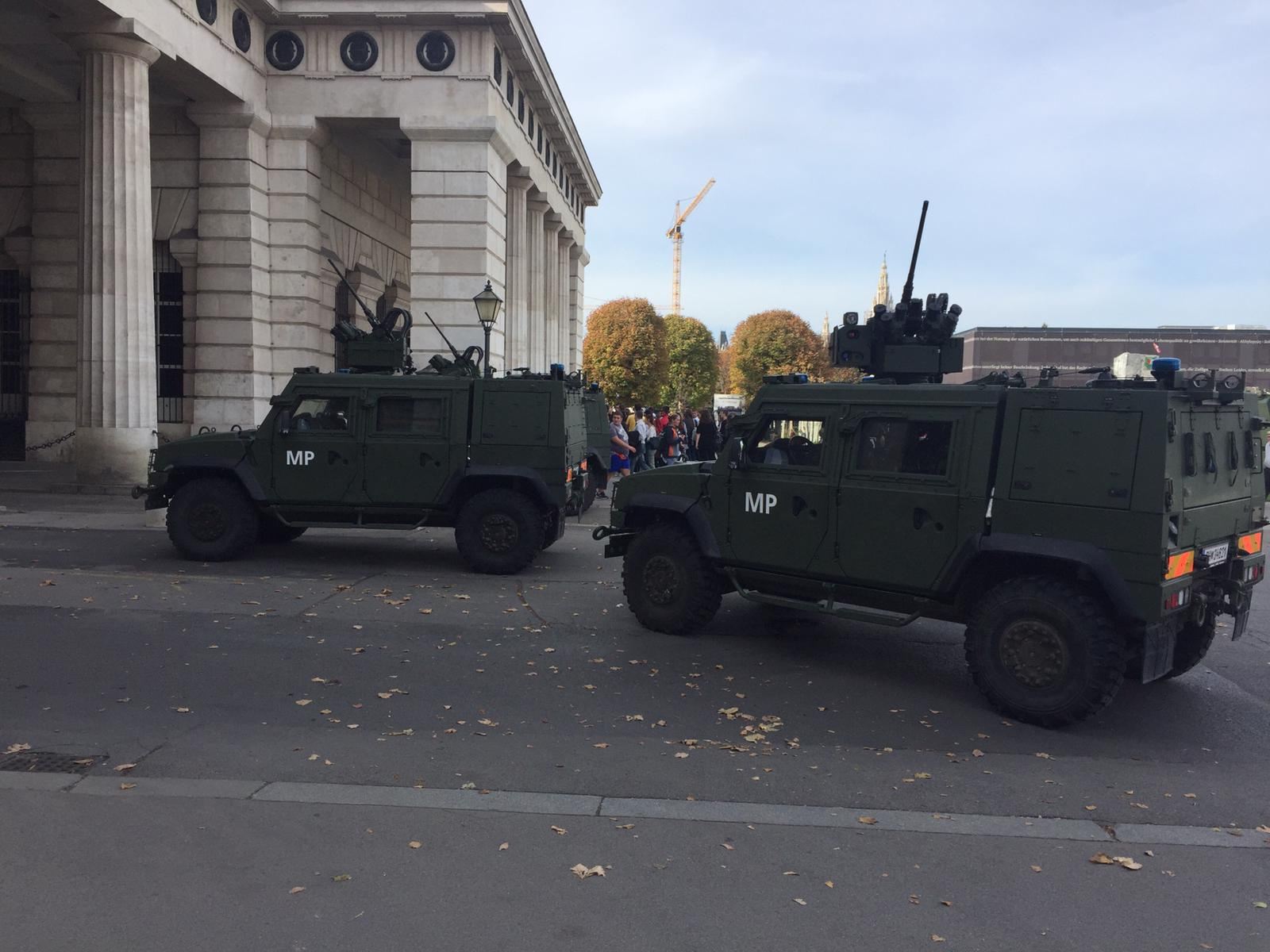
Armoured vehicle of the military police blocking a road in Vienna

=== International tasks ===
Until national police units have been formed, the Military Police is responsible for all tasks which have to be fulfilled by law-enforcement agencies. These tasks are highly diverse and in every field require the employment of specialists with modern equipment.

- Taking down traffic accidents
- Crime scene investigation
- Fingerprinting and photographing
- Interrogations
- Searches/investigations/support in interventions
- Detention of dangerous criminals
- Crowd and riot control
- Operation of detention facilities
- Interventions (Special weapons and tactics - SWAT)
- Personal Protection
- Defence against terrorism

== Requirements ==
- Austrian citizenship
- Completed basic national service in the Austrian Armed Forces
- No previous criminal or disciplinary convictions
- Good vision
- Military driver's license, at least B1
- Security clearance
- Good physical fitness
- Aptitude rating above 5 (= result of the induction process)
- Minimum height: Men: 168; Women: 163 cm

== Selection ==
Professional and militia officers and non-commissioned officers take precedence. (International) experience in command functions of combat units is an advantage. The MP selection procedure can, however, already be undergone after the corporals' course. It is not before the second semester of the NCO training course, though, that the actual training to become a member of the Military Police begins. During the MP selection procedure, the candidates' psychological resilience is especially tested, besides general fitness and the ability to work in a team.

== Training ==
Before admission to the MP selection course, every candidate has successfully to complete basic training 1, 2 and 3 as well as the corporals' course. Having passed the selection course, the candidate is admitted to the first semester of the NCO training course at the NCO Academy. During the second semester the candidate starts MP basic training at the Training Division of the Military Police Command in Vienna, after the successful completion of which s/he becomes a member of the MP.

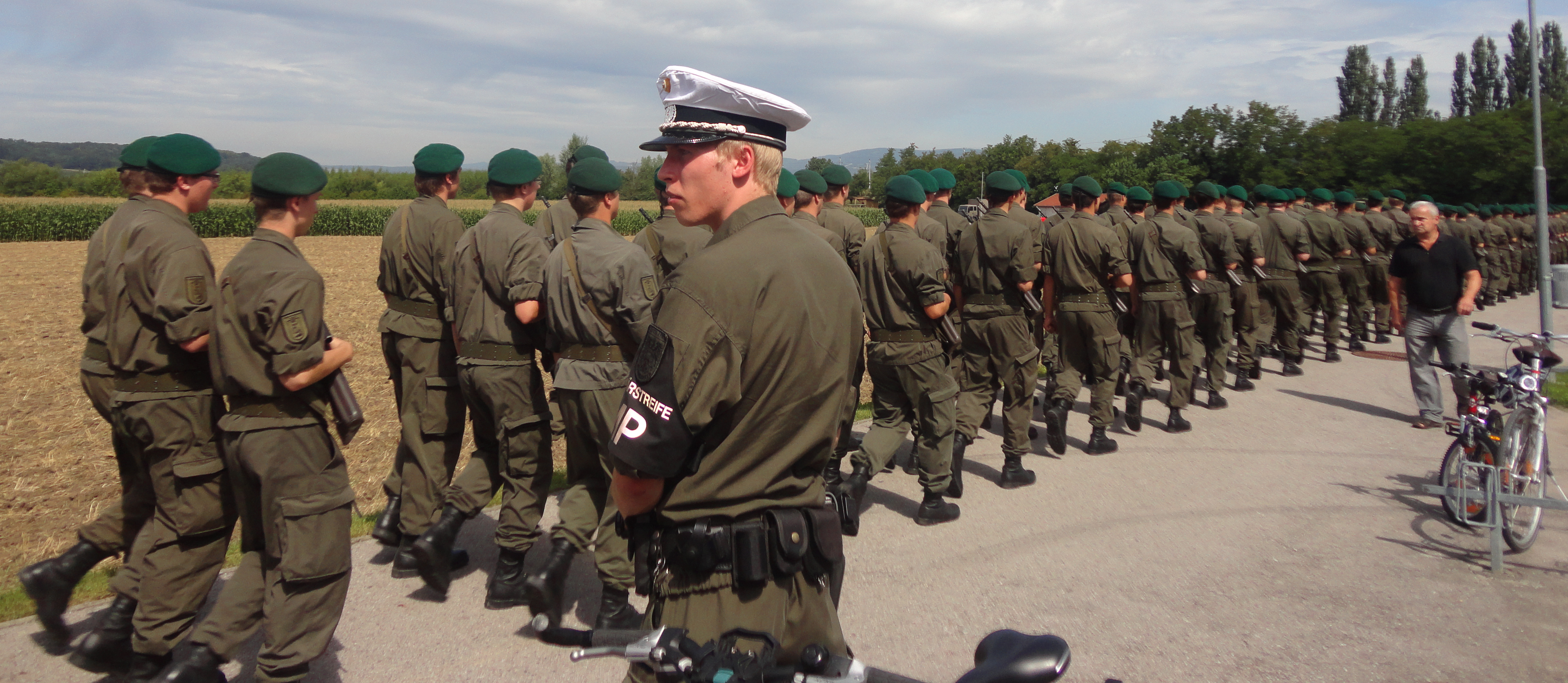
An Austrian MP secures and monitors marching conscript soldiers

=== Basic MP training ===
- Overpowering a suspect
- Legal provisions
- Traffic control
- Check routines
- Inquiry fundamentals
- Law enforcement
- Weapons Training
- Military hand-to-hand combat
- Medical service
- Procedures in buildings
- Various military driver's licenses
- Radio operator training
- CRC training (duty during demonstrations)
- Search for persons
- Employment in the international MP service

=== Special training ===
Basic MP training is followed by special MP training, in which MP members are trained in the task areas they are earmarked for.

- Member of a SWAT team
- Inquiry service
- Close Protection
- Hand-to-hand combat instructor
- Live firing instructor
- Driving instructor
- Dog handler
- SWAT element
- Training to become an operation leader
- Forensic special investigation
- MP snipers

Parts of the training take place in cooperation with the Federal Ministry of the Interior, the Federal Ministry of Justice and the HQ Commandos.

== Weapons ==
- FN P90
- Glock 17 (P.80- Standard Issue)
- Glock 26 (P26)
- Steyr AUG (StG.77)
- Steyr TMP
- Taser
