= Zheng Xiyuan =

Chinese diplomat

- 郑曦原

Consul-General of the People's Republic of China in Manchester
- In office July 2018 – 14 December 2022
- Preceded by: Sun Dali
- Succeeded by: Tang Rui

Consul-General of the People's Republic of China in Mumbai
- In office January 2015 – June 2018

Personal details
- Born: May 1963 (age 63) Neijiang, Sichuan, China
- Party: Chinese Communist Party
- Children: 1
- Education: Lanzhou University; China Foreign Affairs University; Peking University; Duke University

Zheng Xiyuan (Chinese: 郑曦原; pinyin: Zhèng Xīyuán; born May 1963) is a Chinese diplomat who served as the Consul General of the People's Republic of China in Manchester, United Kingdom.

== Early life and education ==
Zheng was born in Sichuan, China. He studied at Lanzhou University, China Foreign Affairs University, the School of International Studies at Peking University, and Duke University. Zheng is married, and has a daughter.

== Career ==
Zheng has previously served in a variety of roles within China's Ministry of Foreign Affairs, including as Vice-consul at the Chinese Consulate General in New York from 1996 to 1998, Counselor at the Chinese Embassy in Greece from 2006 to 2011, and Consul General in Mumbai from 2015 to 2018.

=== 2022 clash ===
Zheng was involved in a 16 October 2022 incident at the Consulate during a protest in support of the Hong Kong pro-democracy movement. Zheng ripped down posters and pulled the hair of a protester, who was dragged into the consulate grounds and beaten. Zheng was recalled to China on 14 December.

== See also ==
- Consulate General of China, Manchester
