= Consulate General of China, Manchester =

Diplomatic mission in Manchester, England

Consulate-General of China in Manchester
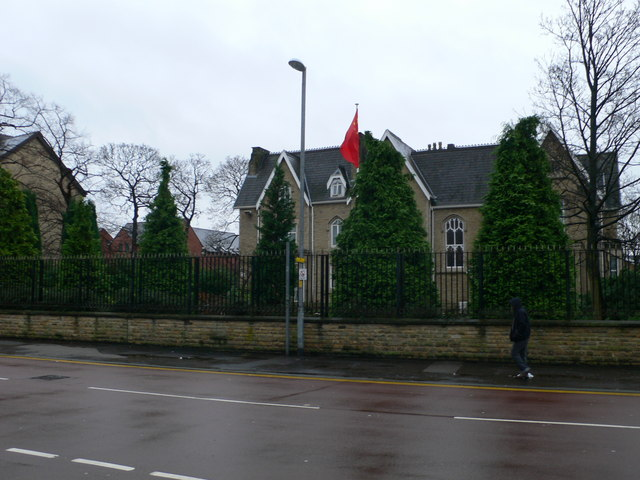
- Location: Manchester, United Kingdom
- Address: 71 Denison Rd
- Coordinates: 53°27′16″N 2°13′08″W
- Website: Official website

The Consulate General of China in Manchester, England, is a diplomatic mission of China in the United Kingdom.

== History ==
The consulate occupies a Grade II listed building called Denison House, built in 1862.

During the COVID-19 pandemic, the consulate distributed 12.7 tonnes of supplies to Chinese students, including masks, disinfectant wipes, and herbal medicine.

On 16 October 2022, the day of the commencement of the 20th National Congress of the Chinese Communist Party, a clash occurred outside the consulate general between UK-based Hong Kong pro-democracy activists and consulate members. Then Consul General Zheng Xiyuan was involved in the clash.

== See also ==
- Embassy of China, London
- Listed buildings in Manchester-M14
