= Clash at the Consulate General of China, Manchester =

October 2022 brawl with protesters

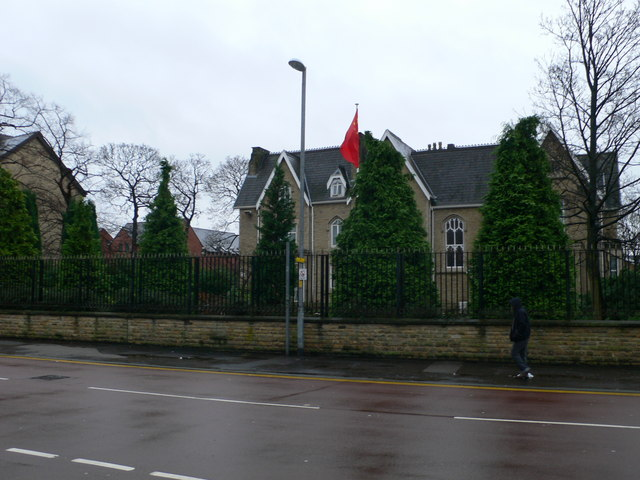
- Location of the clash
- Date: 16 October 2022
- Location: Consulate General of China, Manchester
- Caused by: Opening of the 20th National Congress of the Chinese Communist Party; Ongoing conflict between Hong Kongers and Mainlanders

Parties
Hong Kong pro democracy activists Greater Manchester Police	China: Consul General Zheng Xiyuan; Consul Gao Lianjia; Counsellor Chen Wei; Deputy Consul Fan Yingjie; Consulate staff

Casualties
- Injuries: 1

On 16 October 2022 – the day of the opening of the 20th National Congress of the Chinese Communist Party – a clash broke out at the Chinese consulate in Manchester, England, between United Kingdom-based Hong Kong pro-democracy activists and members of the People's Republic of China (PRC) consulate general.

== Incident ==
The clash started when consulate members, including the consul general Zheng Xiyuan and staff who wore protective gear, attempted to take down protest signs that were being used as part of a demonstration against the Chinese Communist Party (CCP) which was being held in the immediate vicinity of the consulate general. During the course of the melee, a protester named Bob Chan was pulled into consulate grounds and physically assaulted before he was pulled back out with the help of Greater Manchester Police and other protesters. At least four Chinese officials were involved in the incident including Consul General Zheng Xiyuan, Consul Gao Lianjia, Counsellor Chen Wei, and Deputy Consul Fan Yingjie. According to the PRC, Chinese officials were acting in self-defense as the protesters illegally entered and endangered the security of the premises of the consulate general, but this account of the situation was contradicted by Manchester police and video footage of the incident.

== Reaction ==
The clashes were decried as an attack on protesters exercising their right of protest and drew cross-party condemnation. On 18 October, Prime Minister Liz Truss expressed "deep concerns" about the incident. and Britain summoned a senior Chinese diplomat to demand an explanation. Local police said on 19 October that its "complex and sensitive inquiry" would take time. Alicia Kearns, a lawmaker, said that Consul General Zheng "had full sight, and was quite possibly involved, in the assaults." Kearns also said that Zheng was at the scene and was there "ripping down posters" that the protesters had set up. Zheng said that he was present during the clash, but was not involved. This was later contradicted by remarks he gave in an interview with Sky News, where Zheng said it was his "duty" to pull Chan's hair and drag him into the consulate grounds as he had "abused" China and its leader.

A spokesman for the Chinese consulate said that the protesters had "hung an insulting portrait of the Chinese president at the main entrance" and that "This would be intolerable and unacceptable for any diplomatic and consular missions of any country." An article in the Hong Kong Free Press noted that "Pro-Beijing protesters have often wielded effigies of foreign leaders at overseas consulates in Hong Kong."

Chinese foreign ministry spokesman Wang Wenbin claimed that "the troublemakers illegally entered the Chinese Consulate-General in Manchester, endangering the security of the premises", and urged the United Kingdom to "earnestly fulfil its duties and take effective measures to step up protection of the premises and personnel of the Chinese embassy and consulates".

On 20 October, Jesse Norman, the then British Foreign Office Minister, informed parliament that "we would expect the Chinese consulate to waive immunity for (any Chinese officials charged by the police). If they do not, then diplomatic consequences will follow." On 14 December, six Chinese officials were recalled back to China including the consul-general of the Manchester consulate Zheng Xiyuan. This came in response to the expiry of a deadline Greater Manchester Police had set for the officials to waive their diplomatic immunity and appear for questioning in relation to the case. British foreign secretary James Cleverly said that while he was disappointed that the officials would not be interviewed, he was nonetheless satisfied that they would no longer be operating on British soil.

== See also ==
- Wolf warrior diplomacy
- Attack on protestors at the Turkish embassy in Washington, D.C
