= Attack on protestors at the Turkish embassy in Washington, D.C =

2017 civil conflict

Attack on protestors at the Turkish embassy in Washington, D.C.
- Video of the clashes captured by Voice of America in Sheridan Circle in Washington, D.C.
- Date: 16 May 2017
- Location: Turkish Ambassador's Residence, Washington, D.C., United States
- Caused by: Protests against Recep Tayyip Erdoğan's state visit to the United States
- Result: Turkey–United States relations strained

Parties
Turkey; Presidential Police Counter Attack Team; Pro-Erdoğan supporters	Anti-Erdoğan protesters; United States; D.C. Metropolitan Police Department

Casualties
- Injuries: 11
- Arrested: 4

The attack on protestors at the Turkish embassy in Washington, D.C. broke out on May 16, 2017, between Turkey's Police Counter Attack Team and a crowd of protesters, some of whom carried flags of a Kurdish political party. According to Turkey, Turkish bodyguards were acting in self-defense and the protesters were tied to a terrorist group. However, according to US officials the Turkish bodyguards attacked the protesters unprovoked. A protest leader denied that any participants had ties to any terrorist group. Turkish President Recep Tayyip Erdoğan was in Washington that day to meet with U.S. President Donald Trump and observed the clashes from a distance.

The clashes were decried as a Turkish attack on American protesters exercising their First Amendment rights, which guarantees freedom of speech and assembly. Turkey declined to apologize for the incident, blaming the protestors for provoking the response.

Of the 24 men who were filmed attacking protesters, nearly a month passed before any were charged with a crime. However, on June 6, a U.S. House resolution unanimously passed calling for all Turkish security guards involved to be charged and prosecuted under United States law. On June 14, two men were arrested for assault in connection to the attacks, while arrest warrants were issued for the bodyguards. The charges were dropped in March 2018, days before high level meetings between US Secretary of State Rex Tillerson and Erdoğan.

== Clashes ==
Erdoğan just before the clash. Video from Voice of America.

Video of the clashes by Voice of America.

Video of the clashes by Voice of America.

On May 16, 2017, protesters critical of the policies of the Turkish Government gathered in front of the Turkish Ambassador's Residence in Washington on the same day Trump held a meeting with Erdoğan.

Shortly after Erdoğan arrived at the ambassador's residence, tensions began to rise between the two sides of the protest. The D.C. police urged the pro-Erdoğan side to retreat. However, a video widely circulated on social media showed that the pro-Erdoğan supporters and Turkish security guards instead dodged the police officers to attack the peaceful protesters. The attackers punched and kicked people lying on the ground in fetal position repeatedly, causing several to bleed.

Another video showed Erdoğan watching the clashes from a distance, prompting speculation that Erdoğan personally ordered the attack. In the video, a member of Erdoğan's security detail speaks to him in his car. Subsequently, that member of the detail spoke to another member of the security detail who ran towards the crowd and appeared to instigate the clashes.

Two men were arrested at the scene – one for aggravated assault and the other for assaulting a police officer. Two members of the presidential security detail were also detained, but were released after a short while.

== Immediate reactions ==
=== United States ===
Immediately following the events, U.S. lawmakers condemned Turkey's actions during the clashes. Republican Senator John McCain called for the expulsion of the Turkish ambassador. Democratic Senator Claire McCaskill agreed, saying "They were assaulting these people on US soil. Turkish Ambassador should be kicked out of country." A group of nearly 30 Democratic lawmakers, led by Representative Carolyn Maloney, wrote a letter to Secretary of State Rex Tillerson demanding that the Turkish guards be "arrested, prosecuted and jailed". Tillerson said that he was going to wait for the findings from a State Department investigation before taking any action. Peter Newsham, the Chief of the D.C. Metropolitan Police, announced that nine people had to be taken to hospital due to the clashes.

On May 18, Under Secretary of State Tom Shannon summoned Turkish Ambassador Serdar Kılıç after the events.

==== Washington, D.C. ====
D.C. Mayor Muriel Bowser called the clashes a "violent attack on a peaceful demonstration", and said it "is an affront to DC values and our rights as Americans".

On May 17, the D.C. Police Department announced that two individuals had been arrested in connection with the clashes, and stated "The actions seen outside the Turkish Embassy yesterday in Washington, D.C. stand in contrast to the First Amendment rights and principles we work tirelessly to protect each and every day." The department announced further cooperation with the United States State Department and United States Secret Service "to identify and hold all subjects accountable for their involvement in the altercation".

=== Turkey ===
The Turkish Embassy in Washington accused the protesters of starting the clashes by "aggressively provoking" Turkish-American citizens who had gathered to greet the president, leading them to respond in "self-defense". The embassies officials blamed the people affiliated with the Kurdistan Workers' Party (PKK), a group considered to be a terrorist organization by Turkey and the United States, for the clashes.

On May 18, Turkish Foreign Minister Mevlut Cavusoglu accused senior U.S. diplomat Brett McGurk of supporting the PKK.

On May 22, Turkey summoned U.S. Ambassador John R. Bass and released a statement protesting "aggressive and unprofessional actions" by U.S. security personnel and called the United States to conduct a "full investigation of this diplomatic incident and provide the necessary explanation".

== Aftermath ==
=== U.S. Congressional action ===
Name	Date of arrest	Charge
U.S. citizens
Jalal Kheirabaoi	16 May 2017	Assault on a police officer
Necmi Ayten	16 May 2017	Aggravated assault
Sinan Narin	14 June 2017	Assault with significant bodily injury
Eyup Yildirim	14 June 2017	Assault with significant bodily injury
Canadian citizens
Ahmet Dereci	Not yet arrested	
Mahmut Ellialtiis	Not yet arrested	
Turkish security and police officials
Ahmet Karabay	Not yet arrested	
Feride Kayasan	Not yet arrested	
Gokhan Yildirim	Not yet arrested	
Hamza Yurteri	Not yet arrested	
Harritten Eren	Not yet arrested	
Ismail Dalkiran	Not yet arrested	
Ismail Ergunduz	Not yet arrested	
Lutfu Kutluca	Not yet arrested	
Mamet Samman	Not yet arrested	
Muhsin Kose	Not yet arrested	
Mustafa Sumercan	Not yet arrested	
Server Erken	Not yet arrested	
Tugay Erken	Not yet arrested	
Turgut Akar	Not yet arrested	
Yusuf Ayar	Not yet arrested	
Sources	Not yet arrested	

On June 6, 2017, the U.S. House of Representatives called for the members of the security detail who were involved in the melee to be brought to justice. The resolution, which passed in a unanimous 397–0 vote, called for "any Turkish security official who directed or participated in efforts by Turkish security forces to suppress peaceful protests outside of the Turkish ambassador's residence" to be charged and prosecuted under U.S. law. The measure was similar to a Senate demand to waive diplomatic immunity for security forces involved in the assault.

Congressman Steny Hoyer called the incident an outrage that the U.S. cannot tolerate. Congressman Ed Royce called the violence an "act of suppression on American soil". Speaker of the House Paul Ryan called for the Turkish government to "finally accept responsibility for this egregious incident and apologise to those who were harmed".

The day following the vote, Turkey dismissed the resolution saying that it would "distort and politicize" matters and that the measure was "against the spirit of alliance and partnership" between the two countries.

=== Other countries ===
As a consequence of this violence, the German government, host of the 2017 G20 Hamburg summit in July 2017, reportedly rejected the attendance of twelve guards from Turkey's presidential security team.

=== Arrests and warrants ===
On June 14, 2017, two men, Sinan Narin of Virginia and Eyup Yildirim of New Jersey, were arrested for aggravated assault in connection to the clashes.

On June 15, the United States issued 16 arrest warrants, 12 of which were for presidential security guards involved in the clashes. President Erdoğan criticized the United States for issuing the arrest warrants, saying "They have issued arrest warrants for 12 of my bodyguards. What kind of law is this? If my bodyguards cannot protect me then why am I bringing them to America with me?". Erdoğan also claimed that D.C. police failed to intervene during the clashes. Turkey summoned Ambassador John R. Bass and stated that Turkish citizens cannot be held responsible for the clashes since U.S. and local security authorities failed to take the proper measures during Erdoğan's state visit.

In August 2017, a grand jury indicted 19 defendants in connection with the clashes. The 19 defendants included the 16 individuals criminally charged in June. Fifteen of the defendants are Turkish security officials. All the defendants were indicted on a charge of conspiracy to commit a crime of violence. Additionally, many of the defendants were indicted on charges such as assault with a dangerous weapon and aggravated assault.

=== September phone call between Erdoğan and Trump ===
In a PBS NewsHour interview with Judy Woodruff on September 19, 2017, Erdoğan said that Trump had called him the previous week to apologize for the incident, and promised to follow up on it during future talks with the Turkish government. A spokesperson for the White House said that while many issues were discussed during the call, Trump had not offered an apology.

== Charges dropped ==
In March 2018 the Department of Justice announced that it had dropped all charges against eleven of the fifteen members of the Turkish Presidential Counter Attack Team who had been charged with assault. The charges were dropped days before high-level meetings between Secretary of State Rex Tillerson and Erdoğan in Ankara. Tillerson told Erdoğan that the dropped charges were an example of how the U.S. had addressed Turkey's grievances. Contradicting earlier statements, State Department spokesperson Heather Nauert denied political pressure was behind the decision and claimed that a lack of evidence prompted them to drop the charges.

=== Civil lawsuits ===
In May 2018, two lawsuits were filed by victims of the Turkish attack. Fearing Turkish reprisal, many of the plaintiffs withheld their names from the case. One lawsuit filed on May 3 seeks more than $100 million in damages while the other requests an unspecified amount. The Turkish government claimed to be protected against legal action by sovereign immunity. On February 6, 2020, the U.S. District Court for the District of Columbia ruled that Turkey was not protected by sovereign immunity, and that the case could proceed. In July 2020, the Turkish government appealed the sovereign immunity ruling to the U.S. Court of Appeals for the District of Columbia. In January 2021, the Court ruled that the security details of the Turkish president were not protected from prosecution by any law, both domestic nor international, if they as was shown in the evidence reviewed were "strik[ing] and kick[ing]" civilians who had fallen to the ground and did not represent any immediate threat to the President of Turkey. The US Senate and the House of Representatives both also supported the prosecution of the involved security personnel. Turkey’s immunity arguments failed at every level of the U.S. court system. On May 16, 2024, U.S. congressman John Sarbanes led a bipartisan group of 73 lawmakers urging the State Department to hold Turkish President Recep Tayyip Erdoğan accountable.

== See also ==
- Purges in Turkey following the 2016 Turkish coup attempt
- Turkey–United States relations
- Clash at the Consulate General of China, Manchester
