= Nikon Coolpix P80 =

Digital camera model

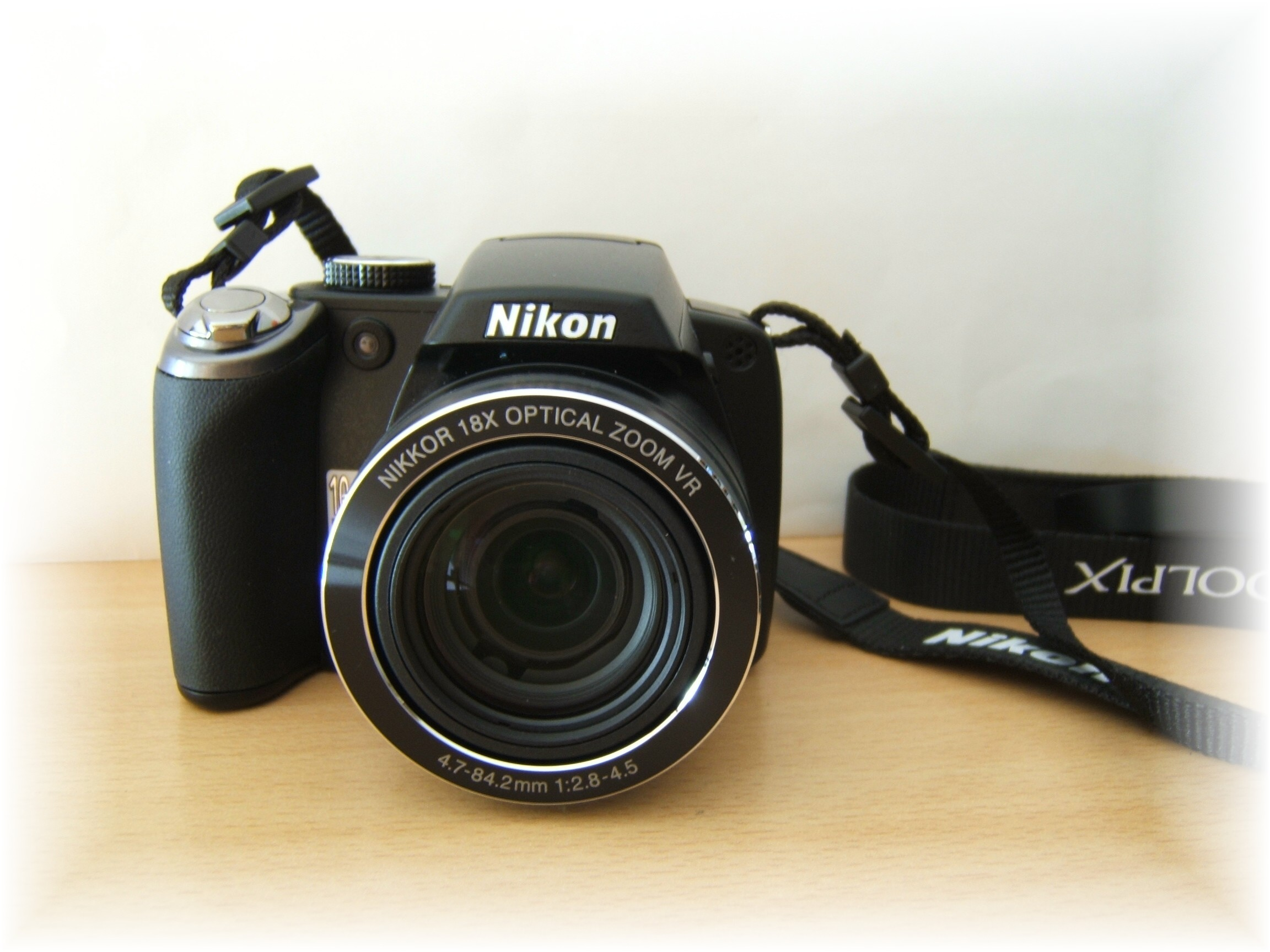

Overview
- Maker: Nikon
- Type: Point-and-shoot

Lens
- Lens: 18× Optical Zoom-NIKKOR 4.7–84.2 mm (35mm format picture angle: 27–486 mm)

Sensor/medium
- Sensor: CCD
- Maximum resolution: 3648 × 2736
- Film speed: 64, 100, 200, 400, 800, 1600, 3200, 6400 (ISO equivalent)
- Storage media: Internal 50 MB + SD

Focusing
- Focus areas: Auto (9-area automatic selection), center and manual with 99 focus areas

Exposure/metering
- Exposure metering: 256-segment matrix, center-weighted, spot, spot AF

Flash
- Flash: Built in flash. Range: 0.5–8.8 m (1 ft 8 in – 28 ft 10 in)

Shutter
- Shutter: mechanical and charge-coupled electronic
- Shutter speed range: 8 sec to 1/2000 sec
- Continuous shooting: 13 frame/s

Viewfinder
- Viewfinder: Electronic

General
- Video recording: 480p and 240p at 30fps and 15fps
- LCD screen: 2.7", 230k-pixel TFT
- Battery: EN-EL5 Li-ion
- Weight: 365 g (12.9 oz) [Not inc batteries or memory card]

The Coolpix P80 is a point-and-shoot digital camera produced by Nikon that was introduced in April 2008.

Its image sensor is a CCD with 10.1 megapixels. It has an 18× optical zoom lens that is not interchangeable.

The Coolpix P80 was superseded in March 2009 by the Nikon Coolpix P90.

== Features ==
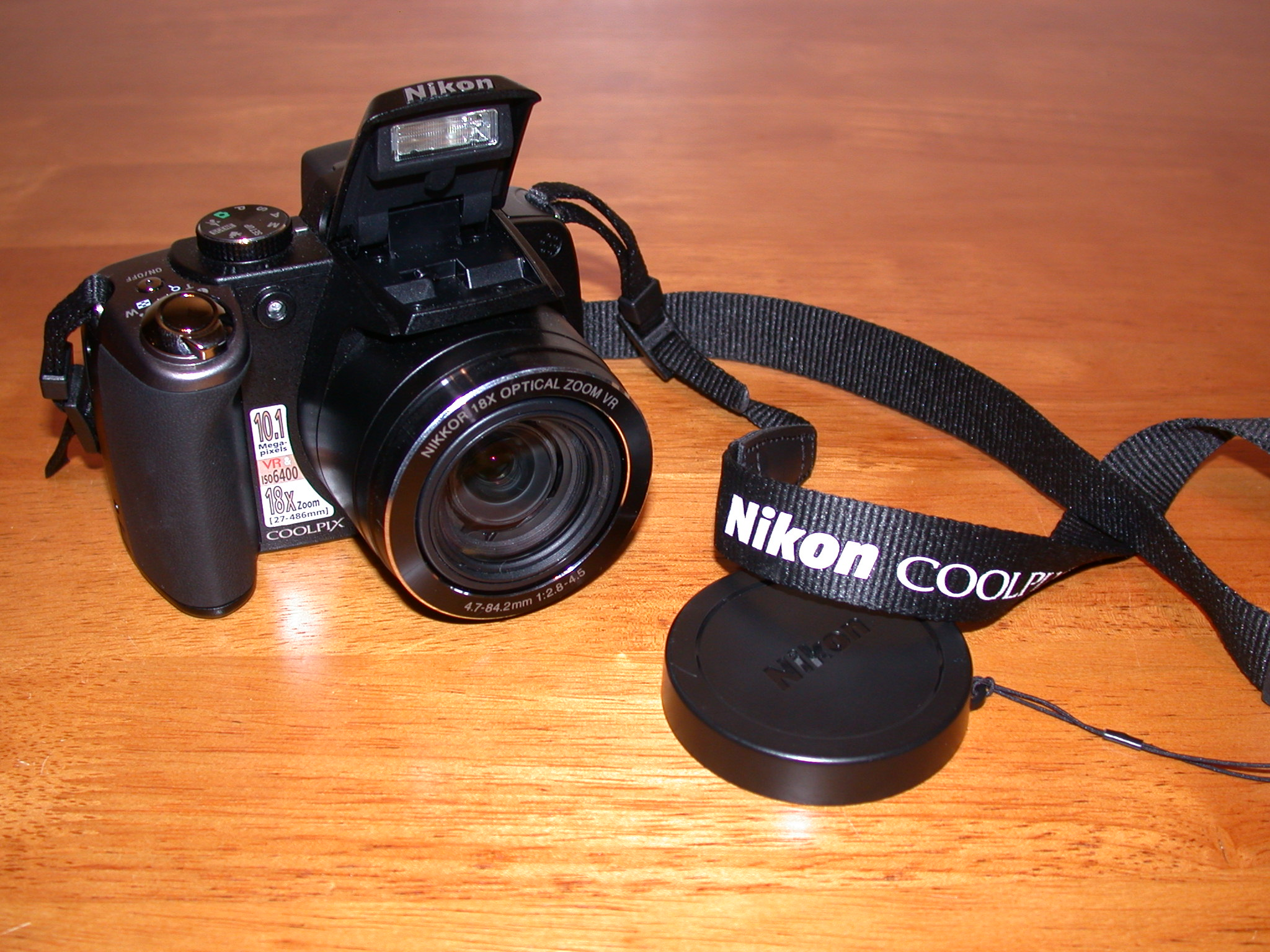
Coolpix P80

Its image sensor is a CCD with 10.1 megapixels. It has a 2.7-inch (69 mm) thin-film transistor LCD screen with 230,000 pixels. The P80 comes with an 18× optical zoom Nikkor fixed lens that is not interchangeable, and with vibration reduction (VR) optical image stabilization. Its image processor provides face-priority autofocus, in-camera red-eye fix, D-lighting, backlight and panorama assist.

The camera can record video in AVI-format at up to 480p (VGA) at 30 frames per second, and audio in WAV-format.

Its interface is a USB port that can be used to connect the camera directly to a printer that supports PictBridge.

Video output can be selected between NTSC and PAL.

A fully charged battery is sufficient to take approximately 250 shots.
