= Pestivirus NS3 polyprotein peptidase =

Identifiers
- EC no.: 3.4.21.113

Databases
- IntEnz: IntEnz view
- BRENDA: BRENDA entry
- ExPASy: NiceZyme view
- KEGG: KEGG entry
- MetaCyc: metabolic pathway
- PRIAM: profile
- PDB structures: RCSB PDB PDBe PDBsum
Search
- PMC: articles
- PubMed: articles
- NCBI: proteins

Pestivirus NS3 polyprotein peptidase (EC 3.4.21.113, border disease virus NS3 endopeptidase, BDV NS3 endopeptidase, bovine viral diarrhea virus NS3 endopeptidase, BVDV NS3 endopeptidase, classical swine fever virus NS3 endopeptidase, CSFV NS3 endopeptidase, p80) is an enzyme. This enzyme catalyses the following chemical reaction

Leu is conserved at position P1 for all four cleavage sites. Alanine is found at position P1' of the NS4A-NS4B cleavage site, whereas serine is found at position P1' of the NS3-NS4A, NS4B-NS5A and NS5A-NS5B cleavage sites

The genomes of Cytopathogenic pestivirus strains express at least one additional protein, called NS3 (p80).
