= Nikon Coolpix P90 =

2009 digital bridge camera

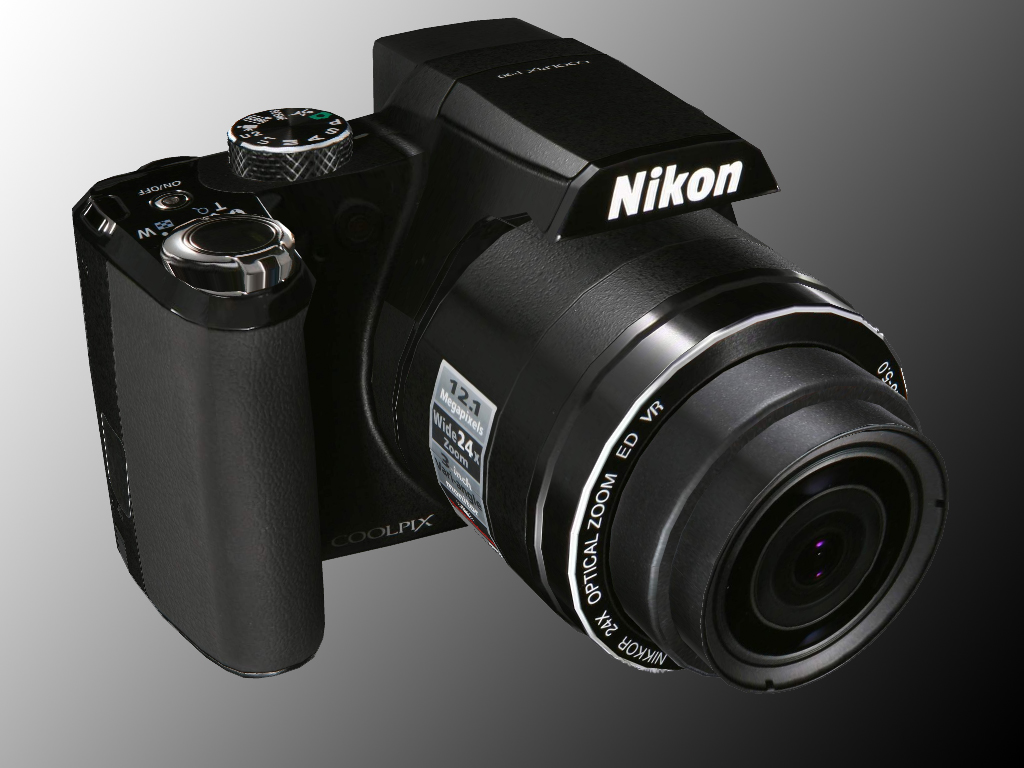

Overview
- Maker: Nikon
- Type: Super-zoom Point-and-shoot

Lens
- Lens: 24× Optical Zoom NIKKOR ED 4.6-110.4mm f2.8~5.0 (35mm format equivalent: 26-624mm)

Sensor/medium
- Sensor: CCD
- Maximum resolution: 4000 × 3000
- Film speed: 64, 100, 200, 400, 800, 1600, 3200, 6400 (ISO equivalent)
- Storage media: Internal 47Mb + SD/SDHC

Flash
- Flash: Built in flash, manual pop-up.

Shutter
- Shutter: mechanical and electronic
- Continuous shooting: 15 frame/s

Viewfinder
- Viewfinder: 230.000 dots LCD panel with variable diopter

Image processing
- White balance: Manual and automatic

General
- LCD screen: 3", 230k-pixel TFT
- Battery: EN-EL5 Li-ion
- Weight: 498 g (17.6 oz) inc lens cap, batteries and memory card

The Nikon Coolpix P90 was launched by Nikon on 3 February 2009 as an improved version of the Nikon Coolpix P80. It is a 12-megapixel CCD digital camera with a fixed 24× zoom lens giving more than twelve times image magnification fully extended.

A year later in March 2010, the camera was replaced by the P100 model. The notable improvement in the P100 is the use of a CMOS image sensor with claimed better light sensitivity and less noise, but with a lower 10 MP resolution.

== Features ==
It is a 12-megapixel CCD digital camera with a fixed 24× zoom Nikkor ED glass lens giving more than twelve times image magnification fully extended.

Vibration reduction (VR) image stabilisation.

The camera has a three-inch (76 mm) LCD that may be folded 45 degrees downward and 90 degrees upward to facilitate shooting above-the-head or low-to-the ground images as well as traditional waist-level and eye-level viewing. The electronic eyelevel viewfinder has the same resolution as the LCD.

Most of the features otherwise are carried over from the P80 model.
