= Comando Especial Anti-Terrorista =

Salvadorian special forces unit

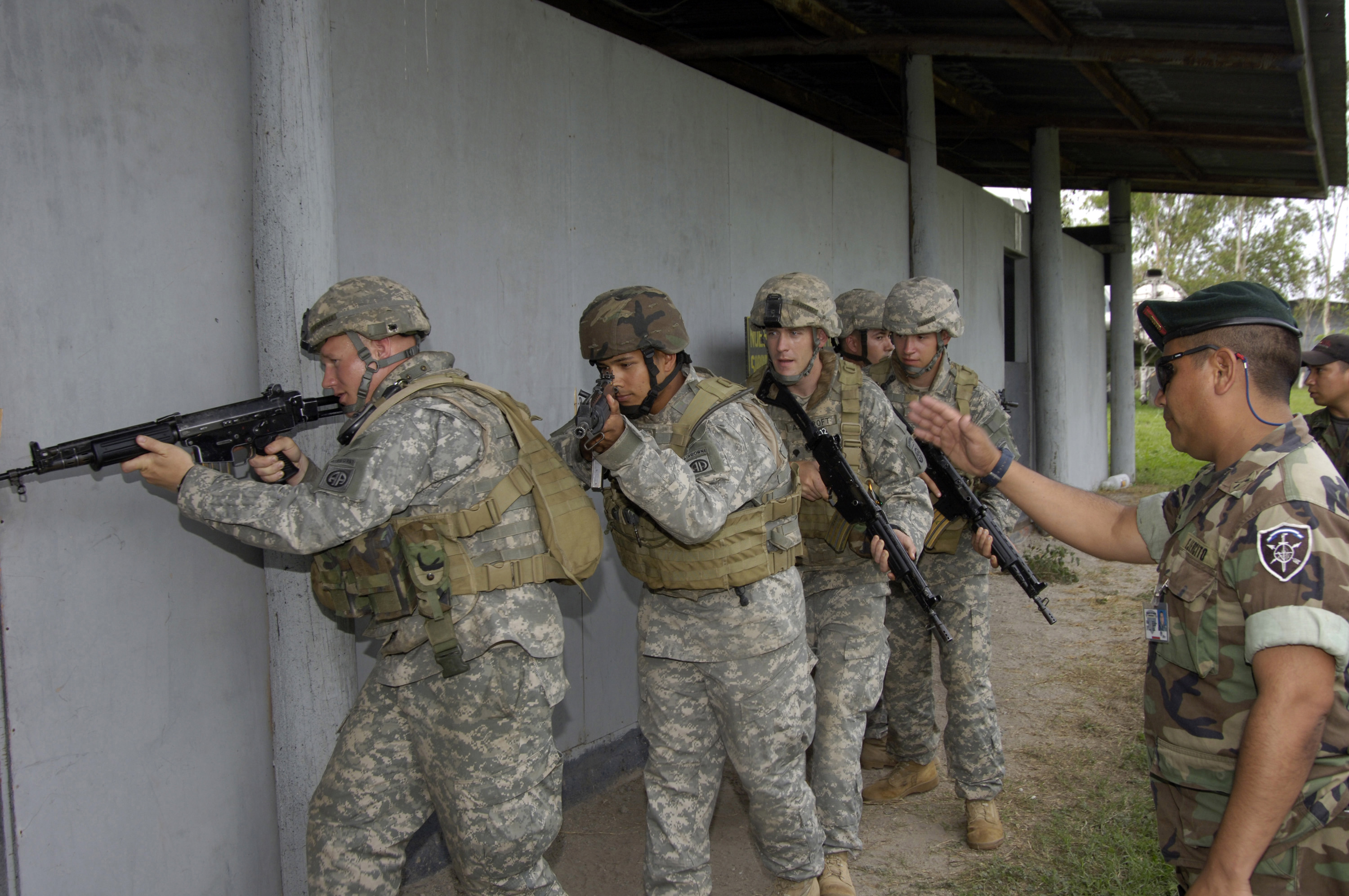
Soldier of the CEAT tells US Army soldier to go ahead for room clearing.

The Comando Especial Anti-Terrorista (Special Counter-Terrorism Command, CEAT) is the only tier one special forces unit of the Salvadoran Army under the operational control of Special Forces Command and executive branch security of El Salvador, created on July 6, 1985 during the Salvadoran Civil War, and trained by United States Special Operations Forces (SOF).

Its main duties are black operations, capture or kill high-value targets, commando style raids on key targets, hostage rescue crisis management, irregular warfare, long-range penetration, protecting high-level meeting areas, providing security in areas at risk of terrorism, special reconnaissance, tactical international counterterrorism, and VIPs protection.

Although under the direct command of the Army chief of staff, the CEAT reportedly consisted of PH (Policia de Hacienda) members. Anecdotal evidence has it that they are trained to ambush and destroy up to five hundred enemy combatants with only two special force operators, employing M18 Claymore anti-personnel land mines facing the killing zone of the planned ambush route and triggered by remote control.
