= WM P80 =

French prototype race car

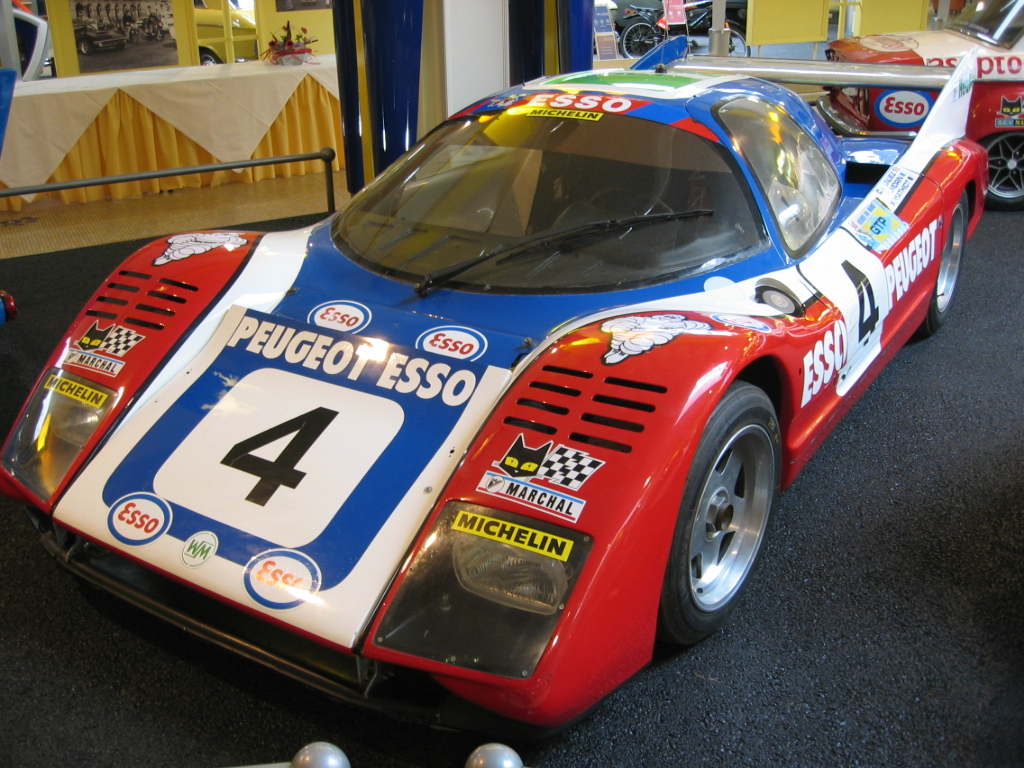
Front

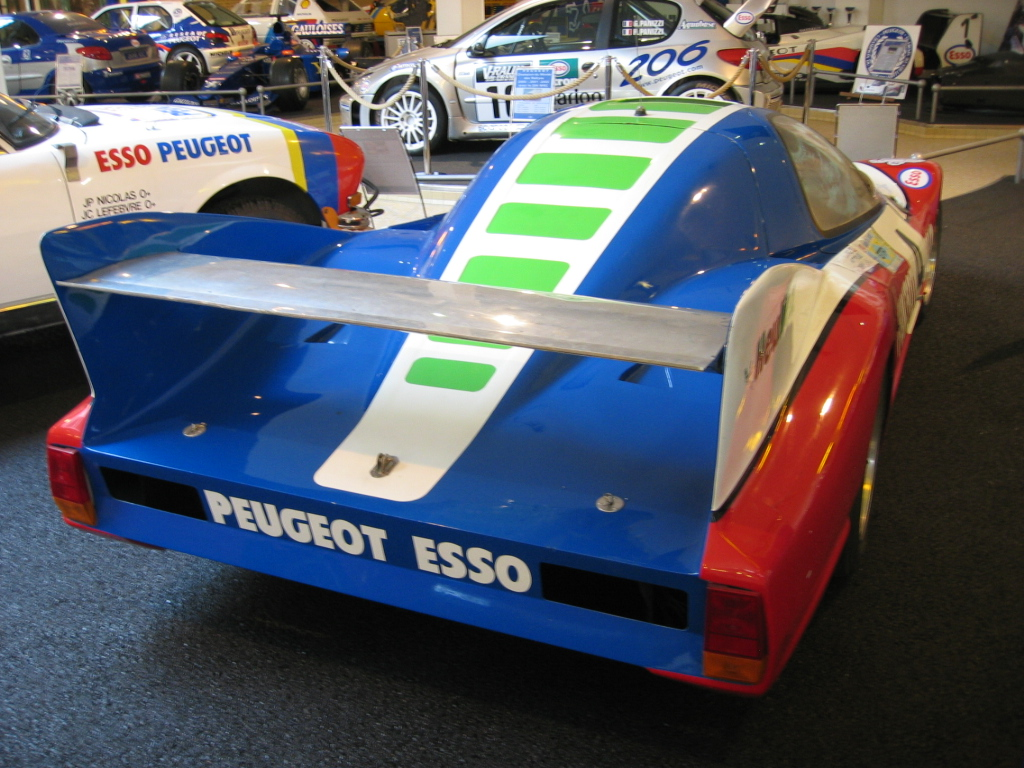
Rear

The Welter-Meunier P80 is a sports prototype race car, designed, developed and built by French racing team Welter Racing, for sports car racing, specifically the 24 Hours of Le Mans, between 1980 and 1982. It was powered by a twin-turbocharged 2.7 L (160 cu in) Peugeot PRV V6 engine, producing 500 hp (370 kW), which drove the rear wheels through a 5-speed ZF manual transmission. The bodywork is constructed out of Kevlar epoxy and carbon fiber.

At the car's first participation in Le Mans, led by Guy Frequelin and Roger Dorchy, the finished 4th overall and 2nd in the GTP (Grand Touring Prototype) class. The following year, with the trio Morin/Mendez/Mathiot he finished 13th overall and 4th in the GTP class.

== Background ==
The WM series was designed by Gérard Welter and Michel Meunier and has participated in the Le Mans event since 1969.

In 1981, four cars took part in the 24 Hours of Le Mans - Two WM P80s and two WM P81s.

== 24 Hours of Le Mans results ==
- 1980: Drivers: Guy Fréquelin and Roger Dorchy - 4th overall and 2nd in the GTP category (Grand Touring Prototype).
- 1981: Drivers: Morin/Mendez/Mathiot - 13th overall and 4th in the GTP category.
