= List of carbines =

A carbine (/ˈkɑːrbiːn/ or /ˈkɑːrbaɪn/), from French carabine, is a long arm firearm but with a shorter barrel than a rifle or musket. Many carbines are shortened versions of full-length rifles, shooting the same ammunition, while others fire lower-powered ammunition, typically ranging from pistol/PDW to intermediate rifle cartridges.

Below is the list of carbines:

Name	Manufacturer	Image	Cartridge	length	shortest state	Country	Production years
9A-91	KBP Instrument Design Bureau		9×39mm	594 mm	373 mm	Soviet Union	1994-present?
AAC/Q Honey Badger	Advanced Armament Corporation, Q, LCC		.300 AAC Blackout	650 mm	508 mm	US	2011-2020
Aero Survival	TNW Firearms		.22LR; 9x19mm.45 ACP.40 S&W; 10mm Auto.357 SIG.460 Rowland			US	
AG-043	Sergei Gavrilovich Simonov		5.45×39mm	680 mm	420 mm	Soviet Union	1974-?
AGM-1 carbine	AL.GI.MEC.Srl		9×19mm Parabellum.45 ACP.22LR	670 mm	670 mm	Italy	1980s
Automatkarbin 5D	Förenade Fabriksverken		5.56×45mm			Kingdom of Sweden	1986–present
AK-9	Kalashnikov Concern		9×39mm	705 mm	465 mm	Russian Federation	2000s
AK-102 AK-104 AK-105	Kalashnikov Concern		5.56×45mm 7.62×39mm 5.45×39mm	824 mm	586 mm	Russian Federation	1994-present
AK-202 AK-204	Kalashnikov Concern		5.56×45mm 7.62×39mm	850 mm	605 mm	Russian Federation	2018-present?
AK-205	Kalashnikov Concern		5.45×39mm	850 mm	605 mm	Russian Federation	2018-present?
AKMSU	Disputed; presumed to have been made by a gunsmith from Darra Adam Khel		7.62×39mm	740 mm	480 mm	Disputed; presumed Pakistan	1980s (only one built)
AKS-74U	Izhmash		5.45×39mm	730 mm	490 mm	Soviet Union	1979-1993
AM-17	Kalashnikov Concern		5.45×39mm	740 mm	490 mm	RUS	circa 2015-present
AMB-17	Kalashnikov Concern		9×39mm	840 mm	600 mm	RUS	circa 2015-present
Amogh carbine	Indian Ordnance Factory		5.56×30mm MINSAS	800 mm	575 mm	India	circa 2005-present
AO-46	TsNIITochMash		5.45×39mm	655 mm	458 mm	Soviet Union	1969 (single prototype only)
AR-57	AR57 LLC		5.7×28mm	762 mm	762 mm	US	2008 or 2016-present
Barrett REC7 PDW	Barrett Firearms Manufacturing		5.56×45mm			US	2008
Beretta Cx4 Storm Beretta Mx4 Storm	Fabbrica d'Armi Pietro Beretta		9×19mm Parabellum; 9×21mm IMI.40 S&W.45 ACP	755 mm	755 mm	Italy	2003-present
B&T APC556	Brügger & Thomet		5.56×45mm	838 mm	220 mm	SWI	2011–present
Berthier carbine			8×51mmR French	945 mm	945 mm	France	circa 1890-?
BSA machine carbine	Birmingham Small Arms company		.30 carbine	n/a	n/a	UK	1946
Burnside carbine	Bristol Firearms Company; Burnside Rifle Company			1000 mm	1000 mm	US	1858-1870
Bushmaster Arm Pistol	Gwinn Firearms Company, Bushmaster Firearms International		5.56×45mm	510 mm	510 mm	US	1972–1991 (rifle variant)
CETME Model LC carbine	CETME		5.56×45mm	860 mm	665 mm	Spain	circa late 1980s to early 1990s
CAR 816 / Caracal Sultan (191mm barrel version)	Caracal International		5.56×45mm	709 mm	627 mm	UAE	2014–present
Close Quarters Battle Receiver/MK18	Colt's Manufacturing Company, Daniel Defense		5.56×45mm	762 mm	679.4mm	US	2000-present
Chapina carbine	Empresa Irmãos Chapina S/A. Industria Metalúrgica		.32-20 Winchester			Brazil	1964-1975
Colt model 1839 carbine	Colt's Manufacturing Company		.525 in. lead ball	1100 mm	1100 mm	US	1838-1841
Colt Advanced Piston Carbine	Colt Defense		5.56×45mm	840 mm	760 mm	US	2010s-present
Colt M4 Commando	Colt Defense		5.56×45mm	762 mm	680 mm	US	1995-present
Diemaco C8	Colt Canada, Diemaco		5.56×45mm	840 mm	760 mm	Canada	Circa 1988-present
Diemaco PDW	Diemaco		5.56×45mm		530 mm	Canada	1990s or 2000s (prototype only)
DRDO CQBR	Defence Research and Development Organisation		5.56×45mm			India	
ČZ 2000 carbine	Česká Zbrojovka Uherský Brod		5.56×45mm	675 mm	435 mm	Czechoslovakia	1986-1990 (LADA), 1990-1991 (ČZ 2000) (prototypes only, project terminated in 2007)
Chauchat-Ribeyrolles 1918 submachine gun	Ribeyrolles, Sutter and Chauchat (RSC)		8×50mmR Lebel	575 mm	575 mm	France	1918 (single prototype only)
Dasan Machineries K16	Dasan Machineries		5.56×45mm	760 mm	760 mm	KOR	Circa 2024 (has not been confirmed to be in production yet)
Daewoo K1	Daewoo Precision Industries, S&T Motiv, SNT Motiv		5.56×45mm	838 mm	653 mm	KOR	1980-present
K2C	Daewoo Precision Industries, S&T Motiv, SNT Motiv		5.56×45mm	875 mm	570 mm	KOR	Circa 2013-present
Desert Tech MDR-C	Desert Tech		5.56×45mm	508 mm	508 mm	US	2014
De Lisle carbine	Ford Dagenham; Sterling		.45 ACP	900 mm	900 mm	UK	1942-1945
D-Max Industries 100	P.G.W. Arms; D-Max Industries		9×19mm Parabellum.38 Super.40 S&W; 10mm Auto.41 AE.45 ACP	977.9 mm	977.9 mm	US	1985
FAMAS Commando	GIAT Industries		5.56×45mm	555 mm	555 mm	France	
Flint River Armory CSA45	Flint River Armory		.45 ACP	889 mm	762 mm	US	2017
Floro PDW	Floro International Corporation		5.56×45mm	720 mm	450 mm	PHL	≈2002
FN .30 Carbine	FN Herstal		.30 Carbine			Belgium	1946
FR8	Various, see article		7.62×51mm CETME; 7.62×51mm	960 mm	960 mm	Francoist Spain	1950s
FX-05 Xiuhcoatl carbine	Dirección General de Industria Militar del Ejército		5.56×45mm	980 mm	780 mm	Mexico	2005
G13 carbine	Tbilisi Aircraft Manufacturing		5.56×45mm	840 mm	750 mm	Georgia	2012
Grendel R31	Grendel Inc.		.22 Winchester Magnum Rimfire	425 mm		US	
GA Personal Defense Weapon	Government Arsenal		7.62×37mm Musang	890 mm	810 mm	PHL	2011
HK416C	Heckler & Koch		5.56×45mm	690 mm	560 mm	Germany	2004
HK437 Sneaker 9"	Heckler & Koch		.300 Blackout	745 mm	487 mm	Germany	2017
G36C	Heckler & Koch		5.56×45mm	720 mm	500 mm	Germany	2001
Hi-Point 995	Hi-Point Firearms		9×19mm Parabellum.40 S&W.45 ACP	830 mm	830 mm	US	1994
HIW VSK	Hessische Industrie Werke		8×33mm Kurz			Nazi Germany	1944
HK53	Heckler & Koch		5.56×45mm	755 mm	563 mm	Germany	
H&R M16A1	ArmaLite; Harrington & Richardson		5.56×45mm	Unknown	Unknown	US	2015
Ingram Durango	Military Armament Corporation		.22 LR; 9x19mm Parabellum.45 ACP			US	1977
Ingram S12	Military Armament Corporation		.30 Ingram.41 Ingram.50 Ingram.45 ACP			US	1977
Taurus T4 11,5"	Taurus		5.56×45mm	811 mm	716 mm	Brazil	2017
Vektor R6	Denel Land Systems		5.56×45mm	805 mm	565 mm	South Africa	1990s
"Jungle carbine" (Lee–Enfield, rifle No. 5 Mk I)	Royal Ordnance Factory; Birmingham Small Arms Company		.303 British	1000 mm	1000 mm	UK	1944
Just Right Carbines	JR Carbines		9×19mm Parabellum.40 S&W.357 SIG.45 ACP; 10mm Auto			US	2012
K31	Waffenfabrik Bern		7.5×55mm Swiss	1105 mm	1105 mm	SWI	1933
Kbk wz. 91/98/23	Centralna Składnica Broni ARMA		7.92×57mm Mauser	1000 mm	1000 mm	Poland	1923
Karabiner 98k	Mauser		7.92×57mm Mauser	1110 mm	1110 mm	Nazi Germany	1935
Kbk wz. 1996 Mini-Beryl	Łucznik Arms Factory		5.56×45mm	730 mm	525 mm	Poland	1995
Kel-Tec SUB-2000	Kel-Tec CNC Industries Inc.		9×19mm Parabellum.40 S&W	750 mm	410 mm	US	2001
Knight's Armament Company PDW	Knight's Armament Company		6×35mm.300 Whisper.300 Blackout	710 mm	500 mm	US	2006
Krag–Jørgensen (M-1899 Carbine)			6.5×55 Rimless			Norway	1889
La France M16K	La France Specialties		5.56x45mm	670 mm	600 mm	US	1982
L22 Carbine	BAE Systems		5.56×45mm	565 mm	565 mm	UK	1985
M-101C	Morgan Arms		9x19mm Parabellum			US	1974
M1 carbine	General Motors		.30 Carbine	900 mm	900 mm	US	1938
M4/M4A1	Colt Defense		5.56×45mm	838 mm	756 mm	US	1987
Magpul PDR	Magpul Industries		5.56×45mm	480 mm	480 mm	US	2006
Marck-15 Hydra 10mm H21	Hydra Weaponry		10mm Auto			US	2015
Marlin Model 1894	Marlin Firearms		.218 Bee.25-20 Winchester.32-20 Winchester.32 H&R Magnum.38 Special.357 Magnum.41 Remington Magnum.44-40 Winchester.44 Special.44 Magnum.45 Colt			US	1894
Maynard carbine	Maynard Factory		.50.52	1000 mm	1000 mm	Confederate States of America	1851
Mini-14	Sturm, Ruger & Company		.223 Remington; 5.56×45mm	917-965 mm	917-965 mm	US	1967
Mini-30	Sturm, Ruger & Company		7.62×39mm	917-965mm	917-965mm	US	1987
Modern Sub Machine Carbine	Ordnance Factory Tiruchirappalli		5.56×30mm MINSAS	745 mm	552 mm	India	2006
Mosin–Nagant (M1907 Carbine)	Tula Arms Plant		7.62×54mmR	1013 mm	1013 mm	Russian Empire	1907
Mosin–Nagant (M1938 Carbine)	Tula Arms Plant		7.62×54mmR	1013 mm	1013 mm	Soviet Union	1939
Mosin–Nagant (M1944 Carbine)	Tula Arms Plant		7.62×54mmR	1013 mm	1013 mm	Soviet Union	1944
Mosin–Nagant (M1891/59 Carbine)	Tula Arms Plant		7.62×54mmR	1013 mm	1013 mm	Soviet Union	1959
Nighthawk	Weaver Arms Corporation		9x19mm Parabellum			US	1982-1990
OTs-12 Tiss	KBP Instrument Design Bureau		9×39mm 7.62×39mm	730 mm	490 mm	Russia	1994
OTs-14-4A-02	TsKIB SOO		9×39mm	500 mm	500 mm	Russia	1992
PAWS ZX-7	Police Automatic Weapons Systems		.30 Carbine.357 (proposed); 9x19mm Parabellum.40 S&W.45 ACP			US	1986
PC-80	Bertil Johansson		.221 Fireball			Sweden	1980
Pistola Herval	Fábrica de Armas da Conceição					Brazil	1879
PM md. 90	ROMARM		7.62×39mm	870 mm	640 mm	Socialist Republic of Romania	1963
QBZ-95B	Norinco		5.8×42mm DBP87; 5.56×45mm	609 mm	609 mm	China	1997
QBZ-192	Norinco		5.8×42mm		266 mm	China	2019
QC-5/QC-10	Quarter Circle 10		9x19mm Parabellum			US	2015
Remington R4	Remington Arms		5.56×45mm			US	2010
SS2-V5	Pindad		5.56×45mm	770 mm	520 mm	IDN	2008
SS3-M1	Pindad		5.56×45mm	797 mm	265 mm	IDN	2023-present
Sa 81 KRÁSA	VVÚ ZVS		7.62x39mm 5.45x39mm	562 mm	315 mm	CZ	1980
San Cristobal Carbine	Armería San Cristóbal Weapon Factory		.30 Carbine	945 mm	945 mm	Dominican Republic	1950
SCAR PDW	FN Herstal		5.56×45mm		536 mm	BEL	2000's
SCAR SC	FN Herstal		5.56×45mm.300 Blackout	650mm	540mm	BEL	2018
FAMAE SG 443 Carbine	Schweizerische Industrie Gesellschaft, FAMAE		5.56×45mm	805 mm	569 mm	SWI; CHL	1977
SIG552	Swiss Arms AG		5.56x45mm NATO/5.6mm GP Pat 90	730 mm	504 mm	SWI	1998
SIG553 SB	Swiss Arms AG		5.56x45mm/5.6mm GP Pat 90.300 Blackout; 7.62x39mm	733mm	503mm	SWI	2008
SIG MCX Rattler	SIG Sauer		5.56×45mm.300 Blackout	597mm	432mm	US	2008
Skbk wz. 1989 Onyks	Łucznik Arms Factory		5.45×39mm	720 mm	519 mm	Polish People's Republic	1987
SKS			7.62×39mm	1020 mm	1020 mm	Soviet Union	1944
Smith & Wesson Model 1940 Light Rifle	Smith & Wesson		9×19mm Parabellum	810 mm	810 mm	US	1940
STV-022 STV-215 STV-270	Z111 Factory		7.62×39mm			Vietnam	2019
STC-16 (SNT Motiv K13)	SNT Motiv		5.56×45mm	810 mm	294 mm	KOR	2021
SNT Motiv K17	SNT Motiv		5.56×45mm	810 mm	294 mm	KOR	2025
SNT Motiv K1AC1	SNT Motiv		5.56×45mm	838 mm	653 mm	KOR	2020s
SR-3 Vikhr	Tula Arms Plant		9×39mm	640 mm	396 mm	Soviet Union	1990s
Stoner 63/63A Carbine	Cadillac Gage		5.56×45mm	931.7 mm	675.6 mm	US	1964
Swiss Mannlicher M1893 carbine	Sig Holding AG; Waffenfabrik Bern		7.5×53.5mm Swiss	1000 mm	1000 mm	SWI	1893
Thorneycroft carbine			.303 British			UK	1901
Type 38 cavalry rifle			6.5×50mm Arisaka	966 mm	966 mm	Empire of Japan	1906
Type 44 carbine			6.5×50mm Arisaka	966 mm	966 mm	Empire of Japan	1911
Wesco Ordnance Mark IV	Wesco Ordnance, Lynwood CA		9x19mm Parabellum.45 ACP			US	1964-2007
IWI Tavor X95 330	Israel Weapon Industries(IWI)		5.56×45mm.300 AAC Blackout; 5.45×39mm 9×19mm	580 mm	580 mm	Israel	2009
Micro Galil	IMI Systems		5.56×45mm	706 mm	465 mm	Israel	1994
Zastava M85	Zastava Arms		5.56×45mm	800 mm	540 mm	Yugoslavia	1985
XM177E1	Colt Defense		5.56×45mm	790 mm	720 mm	US	1966-1994

== See also ==
- List of assault rifles
- List of battle rifles
- List of flamethrowers
- List of machine guns
- List of multiple-barrel firearms
- List of pistols
- List of revolvers
- List of semi-automatic pistols
- List of shotguns
- List of submachine guns
