= Tuma MTE 224 VA =

MTE .224
- Type: Machine pistol, submachine gun, personal defense weapon
- Place of origin: Switzerland

Production history
- Designer: Martin Tuma
- Manufacturer: MARTIN TUMA ENGINEERING, Gmbh

Specifications
- Mass: (Empty) 1.045 kg
- Length: 260mm
- Barrel length: 165mm
- Width: 39mm
- Height: 148mm
- Cartridge: .224 Voboril
- Caliber: 5.7mm
- Action: Blowback
- Rate of fire: 940
- Muzzle velocity: 720m/s
- Effective firing range: 200m
- Feed system: 16 or 26 cartridge detachable grip-internal magazine

The Tuma MTE 224 VA is a machine pistol of Swiss origin and is manufactured by Waffenfabrik Solothurn.

== History ==
The gun was competing in the Offensive Handgun Weapon System (OHWS) programm by SOCOM but lost to the HK MK23. It also never went into full production.

== Characteristics ==
Tuma MTE 224 VA is chambered in the .224 Voboril/5.56x23mm calibre, semi-automatic and fully automatic fire is possible.

Its components are made from chrome nickel-molybdenum steel and 'space technology' type alloys, it can resist longer periods of salty rain and water depths down to 50m.

The .224 Voboril cartridge is a 7.62×25mm Tokarev cartridge necked down to 5.7mm.

== Pop culture ==
The Tuma MTE-224 is featured in Alliance of Valiant Arms

== See also ==
- Colt SCAMP
- Heckler & Koch MP7
- ST Kinetics CPW
- Modern Sub Machine Carbine
- Saab Bofors Dynamics CBJ-MS
- Brügger & Thomet MP9
