= Floro PDW =

Filipino personal defense weapon

- Type: Personal defense weapon, assault rifle carbine
- Place of origin: Philippines

Production history
- Manufacturer: Floro International Corporation

Specifications
- Mass: 2.80 kg (Unloaded); 3.26 kg (Loaded)
- Length: 720 mm 450 mm (stock folded)
- Barrel length: 200 mm
- Cartridge: 5.56×45mm NATO
- Action: Gas Operated
- Rate of fire: 750 rpm
- Feed system: 30-round STANAG magazine
- Sights: Iron, Optical Sight optional via Picatinny Rail

The Floro PDW is a compact carbine that was formerly developed by the Floro International Corporation.

== Design ==
The Floro PDW uses 5.56×45mm NATO ammunition and compatible with 20 or 30-round STANAG Magazines, improving ammunition compatibility requirements among troops while increasing their firepower effectiveness. The use of the Recoil Reduction System (RRS) enhances operator marksmanship and training.

A folding stock is used, being folded on the right side. An optional noise suppressor reduces the sound signature of the Floro PDW for special forces applications.

== See also ==
- Knight's Armament Company PDW — Experimental personal defense weapon designed by Knight's Armament Company.
- Magpul PDR — Compact bullpup carbine being developed by Magpul Industries.

== Bibliography ==
- Jones, Richard D.; Ness, Leland S., eds. (2010). Jane's Infantry Weapons 2010-2011. Jane's Publishing. ISBN 978-0710629081.
