= AAC Honey Badger =

American personal defense weapon

Honey Badger
- Type: Carbine; Personal defense weapon
- Place of origin: United States

Production history
- Manufacturer: Advanced Armament Corporation
- Produced: 2011–2020

Specifications
- Mass: 6.5 lb (2.9 kg) (unloaded)
- Length: 24 in (610 mm) retracted with suppressor 29 in (740 mm) extended with suppressor: Q Honey Badger: 20 in (510 mm) retracted, 25 in (640 mm) extended
- Barrel length: 6 in (15 cm)
- Cartridge: .300 AAC Blackout
- Rate of fire: ~800 rounds per minute cyclic
- Feed system: STANAG magazines
- Sights: Picatinny rail provided for optics

The AAC Honey Badger is an AR-pattern personal defense weapon, designed primarily for use in a suppressed configuration. It is chambered in .300 AAC Blackout and was originally produced by Advanced Armament Corporation (AAC). The weapon is named after the honey badger mammal.

== History ==
=== Replacement ===
In 2013, AAC began focusing its efforts on the production of suppressors. "We made the decision that we are getting out of the rifle-making business", stated Jeff Still, Director of Accessories and Silencers at Remington Outdoor Company. "We are going to focus all of our efforts on silencers and related accessories". In 2017, Kevin Brittingham founded a new company named "Q, LLC". Along with suppressors and a bolt-action rifle of their design, Q has also developed and marketed an improved Honey Badger.

=== Cease and desist ===
On October 6, 2020, the ATF sent Q a cease and desist letter, asserting that the Honey Badger pistol was a short-barreled rifle. Though Q tried to resist this claim, they ceased production of the weapon, and confirmed this in an official statement on October 14. On October 15, the ATF gave their cease and desist a 60-day suspension, but Q chose not to resume production of the Honey Badger until the ATF made a definitive decision, as they believed "the ATF could arbitrarily withdraw the suspension at any time."

== Design ==
The rifle is designed to be very convenient for military use where M16s are issued and in common use, since many similarities would exist in the fire controls, weapon manipulation, and magazines. The weapon is suppressed and it can be made even quieter by using heavy subsonic .300 Blackout ammunition.

Kevin Brittingham, the founder of AAC, wanted to design a weapon that had the ease of use of an AR-15, but the portability of an MP5.

The Honey Badger was developed with a standard M4 upper and lower receiver, a short barrel with a very short gas impingement system and fast rate of rifling twist, a large conventional detachable silencer, and a proprietary buffer tube and collapsible stock featuring two prongs. Whilst with the added silencer, it is 7.62-15.24 cm longer than the MP5SD, the mass is nearly identical unloaded.

== See also ==
- GA Personal Defense Weapon – another AR-15-based PDW, chambered in 7.62×37mm Musang
- Knight's Armament Company PDW – similar AR-based PDW
- Magpul PDR – a bullpup PDW chambered in 5.56×45mm NATO
