= Bushmaster Arm Pistol =

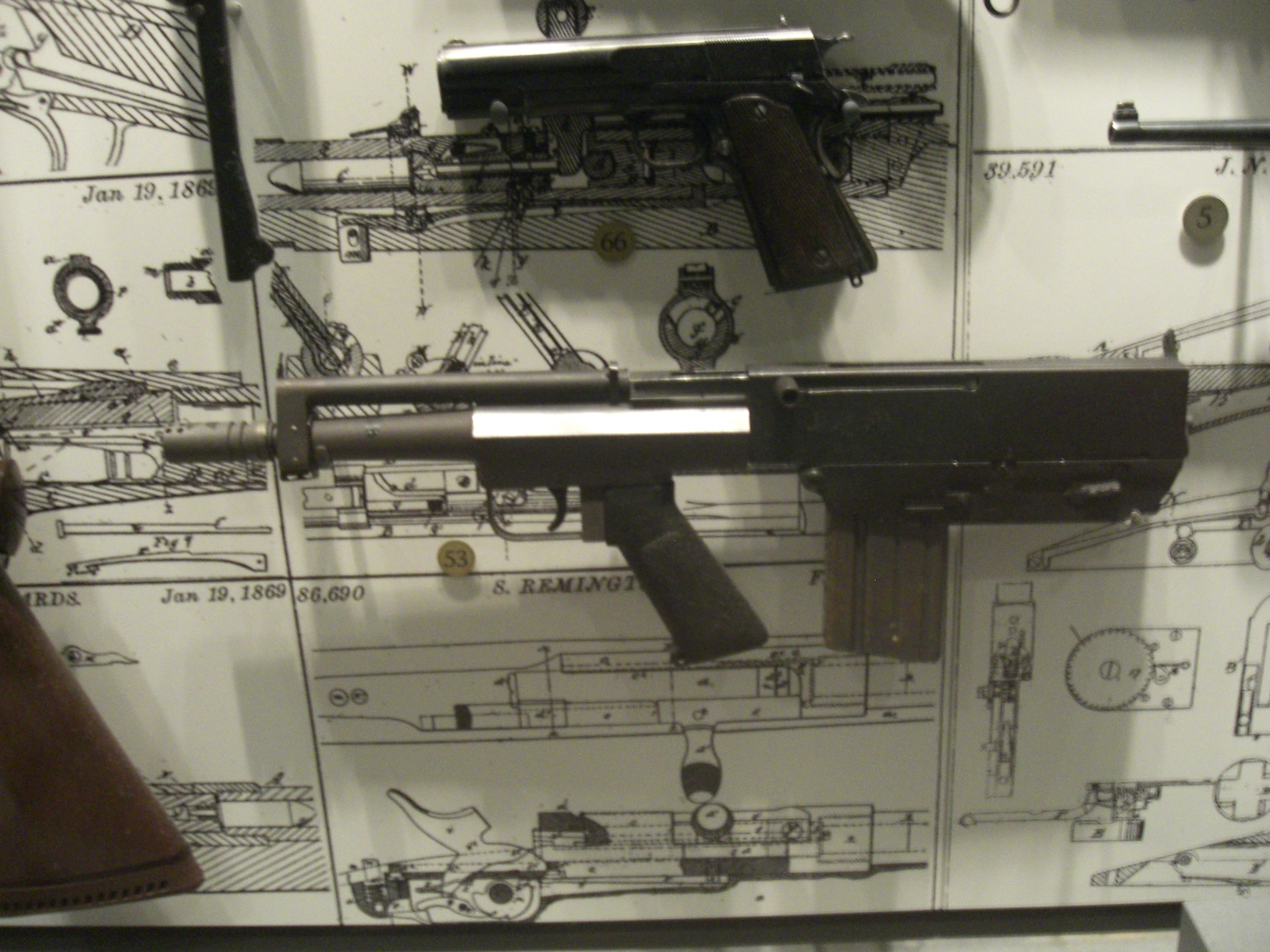
- The Bushmaster Arm Pistol at the National Firearms Museum under a Colt M1911 handgun.
- Type: Bullpup pistol Personal defense weapon Carbine
- Place of origin: United States

Production history
- Manufacturer: Gwinn Firearms Company, Bushmaster Firearms International
- Produced: 1972–1990

Specifications
- Mass: 4.25 lb (1.93 kg)
- Length: 20 in (510 mm)
- Barrel length: 11.5 in (290 mm)
- Cartridge: 5.56×45mm NATO
- Caliber: 5.56mm
- Action: Rotating bolt, Long-stroke Gas piston
- Feed system: 30-round detachable STANAG Magazine
- Sights: Iron sights

The Bushmaster Arm Pistol was a 5.56×45mm NATO firearm, categorizeable as either a long pistol (under the American legal definition of a pistol) or compact carbine rifle, produced by the Gwinn Firearms Company, and later Bushmaster Firearms Inc. The firearm was a new design, having a rotating bolt combined with a long stroke gas piston system similar to the AK-47 rifle.

Some AR-15 parts were used in its construction and it used STANAG type magazines.

Production ceased in 1988 for the pistol variant and 1991 for the rifle following Bushmaster's acquisition by the Quality Products Company the previous year; the company now known as Bushmaster is primarily known for making the more common AR-15 type rifles.

== See also ==
- Magpul PDR – 5.56×45mm – 480 mm long
- OTs-14-1A-02 – 7.62×39mm
- TKB-022PM – 7.62×39mm – 525 mm long
- List of bullpup firearms
