= HK 4.6×30mm =

PDW cartridge designed for HK MP7

4.6×30mm
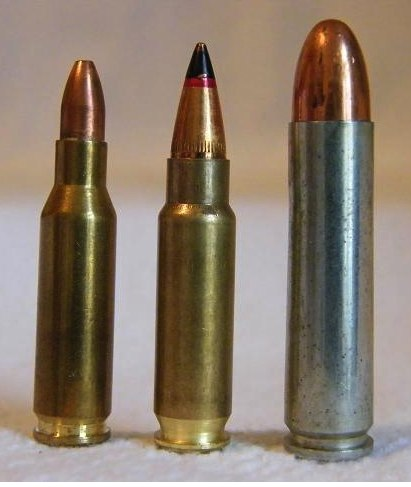
- From left to right: 4.6×30mm (hollow point), 5.7×28mm, .30 carbine
- Type: Personal defense weapon
- Place of origin: Germany

Service history
- In service: 2001–present
- Used by: See Heckler & Koch MP7 Users
- Wars: War in Afghanistan (2001-2021)

Production history
- Manufacturer: Heckler & Koch
- Variants: See Cartridge types

Specifications
- Case type: Rebated, bottleneck
- Bullet diameter: 4.65 mm (0.183 in)
- Land diameter: 4.52 mm (0.178 in)
- Neck diameter: 5.31 mm (0.209 in)
- Shoulder diameter: 7.75 mm (0.305 in)
- Base diameter: 8.02 mm (0.316 in)
- Rim diameter: 8.00 mm (0.315 in)
- Rim thickness: 1.10 mm (0.043 in)
- Case length: 30.50 mm (1.201 in)
- Overall length: 38.50 mm (1.516 in)
- Rifling twist: 160 mm (1 in 6.3 in)
- Primer type: Boxer small rifle
- Maximum pressure: 400.00 MPa (58,015 psi)

Ballistic performance
Bullet mass/type	Velocity	Energy
1.7 g (26 gr) Copper-plated steel bullet AP ("combat steel")	725 m/s (2,380 ft/s)	447 J (330 ft⋅lbf)
2.0 g (31 gr) Copper-plated steel bullet AP (DM11, "ultimate combat")	720.0 m/s (2,362 ft/s)	518 J (382 ft⋅lbf)
2.0 g (31 gr) Copper-plated steel bullet AP (DM31)	680 m/s (2,200 ft/s)	462 J (341 ft⋅lbf)
2.7 g (42 gr) FMJ	600 m/s (2,000 ft/s)	486 J (358 ft⋅lbf)
2.0 g (31 gr) Copper-plated steel bullet AP (SFN Ram / CPS Black Tip)	735 m/s (2,410 ft/s)	540 J (400 ft⋅lbf)
- Test barrel length: 180 mm Sources: Heckler & Koch 2004 Slideshow; Heckler & Koch Ammunition Partners brochures

The HK 4.6×30mm (designated as the 4,6 × 30 by the C.I.P., and 4.6×30mm NATO) cartridge is a small-caliber, high-velocity, smokeless powder, rebated, bottleneck, centerfire cartridge designed for personal defense weapons (PDW) developed by German armament manufacturer Heckler & Koch (HK) in 1999. It was designed primarily for the MP7 PDW to minimize weight and recoil while increasing body armor penetration. It features a pointed, steel-core, brass-jacketed bullet.

== Development ==
The 4.6×30mm cartridge was introduced in 1999 as a competitor to FN Herstal's 5.7×28mm cartridge. Heckler & Koch started the development of a semi-automatic handgun for their 4.6×30mm PDW cartridge, the Universal Combat Pistol (UCP), but canceled it at the prototype stage.

== Overview ==
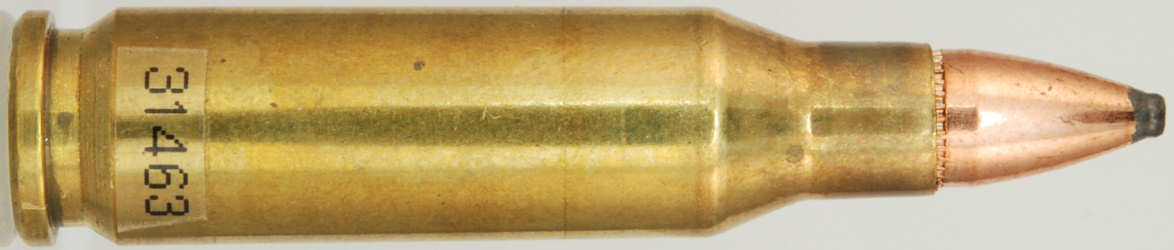
HK 4.6×30mm

Compared to standard intermediate cartridges, one can carry more 4.6×30mm ammunition due to the cartridge's lower weight and relatively small dimensions. Also, due to the lower weight of the bullet, aiming in rapid fire is much easier as recoil depends much on the weight of the bullet. CRISAT testing shows that because of the round's smaller diameter and high projectile velocity, body armor penetration is higher than that of traditional handgun projectiles.

A series of tests performed by NATO in the United Kingdom and France indicated that 5.7×28mm was a superior cartridge. The results of the NATO tests were analyzed by a group of experts from France, the United States, Canada, and the United Kingdom and the group's conclusion was that the 5.7×28mm was "undoubtedly" the more efficient cartridge.

Among other points, the NATO group cited superior effectiveness (27% greater) for the 5.7×28mm against unprotected targets and equal effectiveness against protected targets. It also cited less sensitivity to extreme temperatures for the 5.7×28mm and cited a greater potential risk of barrel erosion with the 4.6×30mm. In addition, the group pointed out that 5.7×28mm is close to the 5.56×45mm NATO by its design and manufacture process, allowing it to be manufactured on existing production lines. The group also pointed out that 5.7×28mm weapons are more mature than 4.6×30mm weapons, and the 5.7×28mm FN Five-seveN pistol was already in production at that time, while the 4.6×30mm Heckler & Koch UCP pistol was still only an early concept. However, the German delegation and others rejected the NATO recommendation that 5.7×28mm be standardized, and as a result, the standardization process was indefinitely halted, though both cartridges would ultimately be standardized by NATO with STANAG 4509 for 5.7×28mm and STANAG 4820 for 4.6×30mm respectively.

A 2004 HK presentation claims that 4.6×30mm Combat Steel retains more energy after CRISAT-penetration than 5.7×28mm SS190 (2 g).

== Cartridge dimensions ==
The 4.6×30mm has 0.87 mL (13.4 grains) H_{2}O cartridge case capacity.

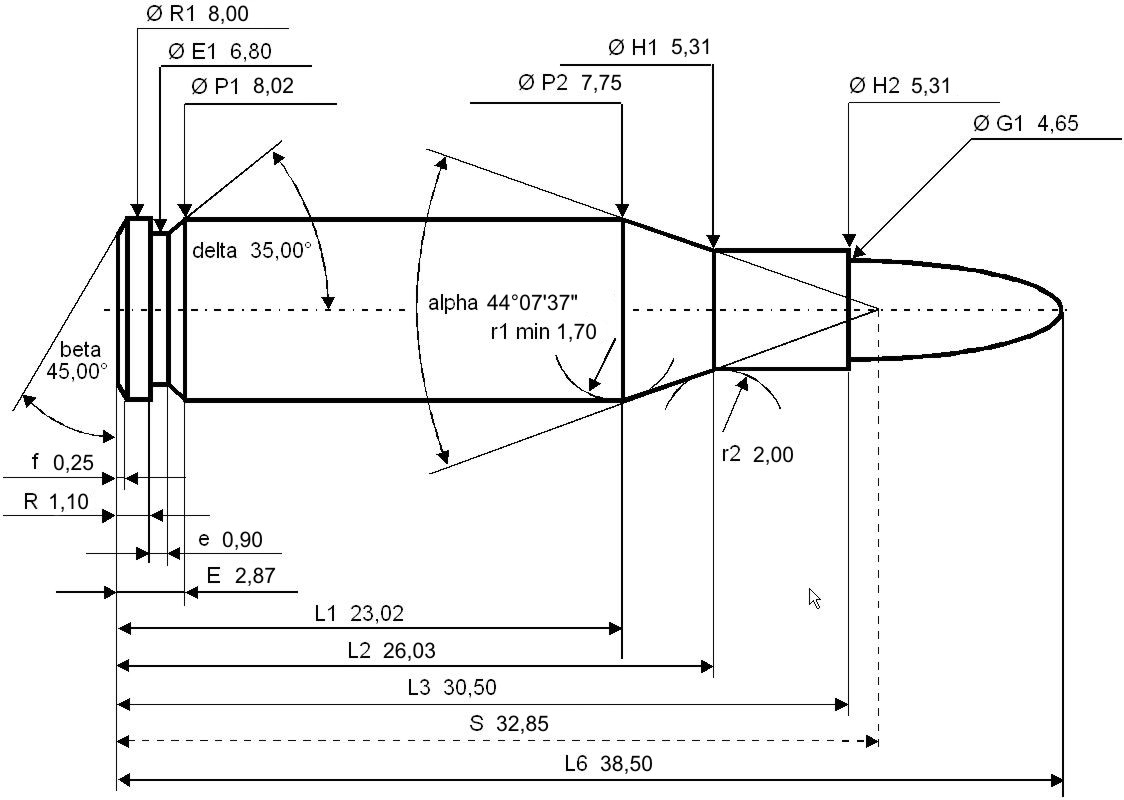

4.6×30mm maximum C.I.P. cartridge dimensions; all sizes in millimeters (mm).

Americans define the shoulder angle at alpha/2 ≈ 22 degrees. The common rifling twist rate for this cartridge is 160 mm (1 in 6.3 in), 6 grooves, Ø lands = 4.52 mm, Ø grooves = 4.65 mm, land width = 1.21 mm and the primer type is small rifle.

According to the official C.I.P. (Commission Internationale Permanente pour l'Epreuve des Armes à Feu Portatives) rulings, the 4.6×30mm can handle up to 4,000 bar (400 MPa; 58,015 psi) Pmax (the nominal maximum) piezo pressure. In C.I.P. regulated countries, every rifle cartridge combination has to be proofed at 125% of this maximum C.I.P. pressure to be certified for sale to consumers, referred to as "PE". This means that 4.6×30mm chambered arms in C.I.P. regulated countries are currently (2018) proof tested at 5,000 bar (500 MPa; 72,519 psi) PE piezo pressure. Despite the relatively high Pmax the bolt thrust of the 4.6×30mm is on a similar level when compared with traditional service sidearm cartridges.

== Cartridge types ==
The 4.6×30mm ammunition is produced by RUAG Ammotec, Fiocchi, and BAE Systems.

=== German Army cartridges ===
DM11 "Ultimate Combat" (2.0 g AP steel projectile)
The DM11 cartridge weighs 6.5 g and uses a 2-g copper-plated steel bullet projectile at 720 m/s (2,362 ft/s) muzzle velocity. The DM11 Penetrator cartridge is designed for the MP7. The Ultimate Combat can penetrate the NATO CRISAT target at more than 200 meters. This ammunition combines energy transfer in soft targets and very good penetration. The muzzle velocity V_{0} and V_{100} indicate a G1 ballistic coefficient of approximately 0.141 to 0.150 (BCs are somewhat debatable) making the DM11 projectile aerodynamically more efficient compared to typical service handgun projectiles, but less efficient compared to typical assault rifle projectiles. At the stated effective range of 200 m, the DM11 projectile will be traveling at approximately Mach 1.25 (425 m/s) under International Standard Atmosphere (ISA) conditions at sea level (air density ρ = 1.225 kg/m^{3}). Made by RUAG.
A 2004 Heckler and Koch slideshow claims a 300 m range for CRISAT penetration for the "Ultimate Combat". This early version was made by Radway Green of UK.
DM18 (Blank)
Blank cartridge weighing 4.5 g. Available through RUAG/RWS.
DM21 (2.6 g FMJ)
Tombac-plated steel jacket, lead core. Projectile weighs 2.6 g, cartridge weighs 6.9 g. Available through RUAG/RWS. Is made by MEN – Metallwerk Elisenhütte.
DM31 (2.0 g AP steel projectile)
Found in HK brochures for MP7A1. Same claim of penetrating CRISAT target at 200+ meters. Weighs 7.3 g and uses a 2-g copper-plated steel bullet. Reported muzzle velocity is 670 m/s (2,198 ft/s). Is made by MEN – Metallwerk Elisenhütte.
DM41 (2.0 g DEA)
Controlled-deformation copper-alloy (lead-free) bullet for German special forces. Projectile weighs 2.60 g, cartridge weighs 6.9 g.

=== Other RUAG cartridges ===
Action SX (2.0 g DEA)
Controlled-deformation copper-alloy (lead-free) bullet weighing 2.0 g. Cartridge weighs 6.3 g. Website data identical to DM41 DEA.
Older version: The Action 4.6×30mm Law Enforcement cartridge weighs 6.5 g and is loaded with a 2 g CuZn-alloy (brass) solid hollow point projectile that achieves 700 m/s (2,300 ft/s) muzzle velocity. The cartridge is designed for the MP7. This ammunition is optimized for energy transfer in soft targets and to offer decent penetration performance on hard and combined targets like car doors or glass and body armor. The muzzle velocity V_{0} and V_{50} indicate a G1 ballistic coefficient of 0.112 to 0.119. At the range of 50 m, the 2 g Action projectile travels at approximately Mach 1.67 (586 m/s or 1923 f/s) under International Standard Atmosphere conditions at sea level (air density ρ = 1.225 kg/m^{3}).
Action Law Enforcement cartridge technical data (old):
- Temperature range: -30 °C to +52 °C
- Velocity, energy at 0 m: 700 m/s, 480 joules
- Velocity, energy at 50 m: 568 m/s, 322 joules
- Ballistic coefficient C 1: 0.112-0.119 (ICAO)/(Army Metro)
- Mean chamber pressure: max. 400 MPa
- Penetration in 20% gelatine: bare at 25 m: < 30 cm
- Accuracy at 50 m: Ø 5 cm
- Effective service range: 200 m (656 ft)
FMJ SX (2.6 g FMJ)
Tombac-plated steel jacket, lead core. Cartridge weight 6.9 g.
Possibly the same as DM31, as the same reference term is used in an old version of its datasheet.
Older version: The ball 4.6×30mm cartridge weighs 7 g and is loaded with a 2.6 g full metal jacket projectile with a PbSb-alloy core and a copper-plated steel jacket that achieves 600 m/s (2,000 ft/s) muzzle velocity. The cartridge is designed for the MP7. This ammunition is optimized for energy transfer in soft targets and offers good precision. The muzzle velocity V_{0} and V_{100} indicate a G1 ballistic coefficient of 0.171 to 0.187. At the range of 100 m, the 2.6 g ball projectile travels at approximately Mach 1.36 (463 m/s) under International Standard Atmosphere conditions at sea level (air density ρ = 1.225 kg/m^{3}).
Ball cartridge technical data (old):
- Temperature range: between -54 °C and +52 °C
- Velocity, energy at 0 m: 600 m/s, 486 Joules
- Velocity, energy at 100 m: 463 m/s, 320 Joules
- Ballistic coefficient C 1: 0.171-0.187 (ICAO)/(Army Metro)
- Mean chamber pressure: max. 400 MPa
- Penetration in gelatine bare at 25 m: < 35 cm
- Accuracy at 100 m: Ø 8 cm
- Effective range:~300 m (984 ft) (HK claims that the FMJ round has more retained energy than the "Combat Steel" due to the FMJ's heavier projectile.)

Types not described here are:

- SEMI FRANGIBLE SX (1.7 g partial tombac-steel jacket, copper core)
- AP SX (2.0 g solid steel core, Cu-coated, blackened) – possibly the same as DM31, as the same reference term is used in an old version of its datasheet
- SUBSONIC SX (5.0 g tungsten alloy core, Cu-plated, blackened) – HK claims that an early version can penetrate the CRISAT target at 90 m.
- TRAINING SX (1.7 g partial tombac-steel jacket, tin core) – HK claims that an early version can penetrate the CRISAT target at 100 m.
- BLANK SX

=== Others ===
The "Combat Steel" is an AP round weaker than the "Ultimate Combat". The round was made by Radway Green of UK. Other ammunition mentioned in the 2004 HK presentation without an obvious successor are:

- 1.7 g Spoon Nose (solid copper)
- 1.3 g Tracer
- 1.2 g Soft Frangible
- Drill

Heckler & Koch's 2012 website hosts ammunition datasheets from manufacturers of 4.6×30mm ammunition. Of these, a SFN Ram ammunition (later called "CPS Black Tip") has a muzzle energy of approximately 525 J that is comparable to 9×19mm rounds.

VBR produces a 4.6×30mm two-part controlled fragmenting projectile that is claimed to increase the content of the permanent wound cavity and double the chance of hitting a vital organ.

== Platforms ==
Name	Country	Type	Note
Heckler & Koch UCP	Germany	Semi-automatic pistol	Cancelled at the prototype stage.
Heckler & Koch MP7 (2001)	Germany	Personal defense weapon/Submachine gun	
ST Kinetics CPW (2008)	Singapore	Personal defense weapon/Submachine gun	4.6 caliber as potential conversion from 9mm.
CMMG Banshee Mk4 (2021)	USA	Pistol/Carbine (as SBR)	First firearm marketed for civilians in 4.6 caliber.
Tommy Built Tactical T7 (2024)	USA	Pistol/Carbine (as SBR)	MP7 clone marketed to civilians in 4.6 caliber.
