= D-Max Industries 100 =

D-Max Industries Model 100
- Type: Semi automatic carbine
- Place of origin: United States

Production history
- Designer: Darrel Holland; David M. Dugger
- Designed: 1985
- Manufacturer: P.G.W. Arms; D-Max Industries
- Produced: 1986-1993
- Variants: D-Max 100C carbine D-Max 100P pistol

Specifications
- Mass: 3.4kg (carbine); 2.2kg (pistol)
- Length: 977.9mm
- Barrel length: 406mm (carbine); 152mm (pistol)
- Cartridge: .45 ACP.41 Action Express; 10mm Auto.40 S&W.38 Super; 9x19mm Parabellum
- Action: Blowback
- Rate of fire: Semi automatic
- Feed system: 30-round M3 magazine (.45ACP/.41AE/10mm Auto/.40 S&W/.38 Super); 32/50-round Sten/Lanchester magazine (9x19mm Parabellum)
- Sights: Iron sights

The D-Max Industries 100 is a semi automatic carbine manufactured by D-Max Industries of Auburn, Washington. It could also be chambered in .45 ACP, .41AE, .40 S&W, .38 Super and 9×19mm Parabellum. The D-Max 100 existed in 2 variants, the D-Max 100C carbine and D-Max 100P pistol.

== Development ==
The D-Max 100 was designed by David M. Dugger, a former LE officer and firearms instructor in Washington who decided to develop a cost effective firearm intended for an LE role that was more rugged, durable, easy to field strip/maintain capable than a standard issue weapon. The pistol variant was intended for confined CQB situations whereas the carbine was intended to replace the shotgun in tactical roles when the pistol was not effective. During range tests, the D-Max 100 was rumored to be accurate and reliable with virtually no reported malfunctions. The D-Max 100 was also offered to the civilian market outside LE agencies.

== Overview ==
The D-Max Industries 100 is a semi automatic, simple blowback operated pistol calibre carbine fed from modified M3 SMG magazines inserted on the side to allow the user to fire from a low profile position without affecting the balance. The self cleaning closed firing bolt is similar to that found on the Sten/Sterling/F1 submachine guns but using the firing pin from an M1911 pistol and using a guide rod/spring to eject the rounds. The semi automatic only lower receiver/fire control group uses an AK type trigger/hammer. Field stripping is done removing takedown pins held in with a safety wire. The upper receiver is a round type whereas the lower/FCG is stamped sheet. The reciprocating cocking handle is mounted on the left side.

== See also ==
- List of carbines
