= ČZW-438 =

- Type: Personal defense weapon
- Place of origin: Czech Republic

Production history
- Designer: Czech Weapons
- Manufacturer: Czech Weapons

Specifications
- Mass: 2.7 kg
- Length: 690mm 445mm with folded stock
- Barrel length: 220mm
- Cartridge: 4.38×30mm Libra
- Rate of fire: 850 rpm, 2 or 3 round burst
- Muzzle velocity: 700 m/s
- Effective firing range: 200 meters
- Feed system: 15, 30 or 40 round magazine
- Sights: adjustable 50, 100, 200 m, picatinny rail

The ČZW-438 is a personal defense weapon designed by Czech Weapons (ČZW), aiming at increasing range and armor penetration.

== Design ==
The ČZW-438 is chambered in 4.38×30mm Libra which was also developed by ČZW. The stock can be folded and the gun comes with a flash suppressor attached.

== ČZW-438 M9 ==
ČZW-438 M9
- Type: Submachine gun
- Place of origin: Czech Republic

Production history
- Designer: Czech Weapons
- Manufacturer: Czech Weapons

Specifications
- Mass: 2.7 kg
- Length: 690mm 445mm with folded stock
- Barrel length: 220mm
- Cartridge: 9x19mm Parabellum
- Rate of fire: 780 rpm, 2 or 3 round burst
- Feed system: 15 or 30 round magazine
- Sights: adjustable 50, 100, 200 m, picatinny rail

ČZW offered a version chambered in 9x19mm Parabellum called ČZW-438 M9,it is not advertised with an effective range of 200 meters and body armor penetration and has slightly lower fire rate. ČZW claims a 95% parts commonality with the original.
