= 4.38×30mm Libra =

Cartridge for personal defence weapons

- Type: Personal defence weapon Pistol
- Place of origin: Czech Republic

Production history
- Designer: Vlastimil Libra
- Designed: 2002
- Manufacturer: Czech Weapons (ČZW)

Specifications
- Parent case: .22 Hornet
- Case type: Rimless, bottlenecked
- Bullet diameter: 4.40 mm (0.173 in)
- Land diameter: 4.28 mm (0.169 in)
- Neck diameter: 4.90 mm (0.193 in)
- Shoulder diameter: 6.88 mm (0.271 in)
- Base diameter: 7.56 mm (0.298 in)
- Rim diameter: 7.65 mm (0.301 in)
- Rim thickness: 1.24 mm (0.049 in)
- Case length: 30.10 mm (1.185 in)
- Overall length: 41.00 mm (1.614 in)
- Maximum pressure: 430 MPa (62,000 psi)

Ballistic performance
| Bullet mass/type | Velocity | Energy |
|---|---|---|
| 45 gr (3 g) Spitzer | 2,300 ft/s (700 m/s) | 528 ft⋅lbf (716 J) |

The 4.38×30mm Libra (.17 Libra) is a centerfire cartridge designed for use in personal defense weapons.

== Description ==
It was designed and has been manufactured by ČZW for use in their ČZW-438 PDW.

The cartridge is based on a .22 Hornet cartridge converted to a rimless design and necked down to .17 calibre.

=== Variants ===
- .17 Libra [4.38×30mm]: A rimless varmint-hunting and sport-shooting cartridge
- .17 Rimmed Libra [4.38×30mmR]: A rimmed varmint-hunting and sport-shooting cartridge for use with break-open actions
- .17 Libra Magnum [unknown]: A longer, more powerful 4.38mm rimless round for use in pistols or personal defense weapons

== See also ==
- 4 mm caliber
