= Advanced Armament Corporation =

American firearms manufacturer

- Type: Subsidiary
- Industry: Defense
- Founded: 1994; 32 years ago
- Headquarters: 2121 Old Dunbar Road; West Columbia, South Carolina
- Products: Firearms, weapons, sound suppressors
- Parent: JJE Capital Holdings, LLC.
- Website: advanced-armament.com

Advanced Armament Corporation (AAC) is an American company that develops and manufactures firearms, firearm suppressors, muzzle devices and related tactical accessories.

== History ==
Kevin Brittingham founded the Advanced Armament Corporation in 1994 to manufacture sound suppressors, having previously been a distributor for GEMTECH, another suppressor manufacturer. Under his direction, AAC grew to be one of the largest suppressor manufacturers in the U.S., including a number of small military contracts. In early 2015, AAC moved locations from Lawrenceville, Georgia to a new, larger facility in Huntsville, Alabama.

Parent company Remington Outdoor Company filed for Chapter 11 bankruptcy protection in March 2018. As a result of the bankruptcy auction, the company was sold to JJE Capital Holdings, LLC in September 2020.

JJE Capital Holdings, which also owns Palmetto State Armory, integrated AAC into its portfolio.

== Products ==
AAC's suppressor lineup includes models suitable for virtually every firearm caliber between .22 Long Rifle and .50 BMG. Rimfire models include the Aviator2, and Element2. Centerfire pistol caliber suppressors include the Ti-Rant series and Illusion9 the only true eccentric designed suppressor to utilize factory sights as well as allowing the use of rail mounted accessories on the host firearm, both of which use an interchangeable piston system in their Nielsen device. Centerfire rifle suppressors include the M4-2000 (used by numerous military units including the Navy SEALs), 762-SDN-6, SR series, and Cyclone (for .30 caliber precision rifles).

The company's Titan-QD Fast-Attach suppressor is used on the US Army's M2010 Enhanced Sniper Rifle and the Remington MSR (Modular Sniper Rifle). The suppressor eliminates 98 percent of muzzle flash, 60 percent of recoil, and reduces sound by 32 decibels. It also underwent a major 2026 relaunch featuring updated silencers and host rifles.

=== Rimfire suppressors ===
- Element 2: The Element is a premium "thread-on" suppressor for handguns and rifles chambered in .17 HMR, .22 LR, and .22 WMR.
- Aviator 2: All aluminum "thread-on" suppressor for handguns and rifles chambered in .22 LR that is user serviceable.

=== Integrally suppressed rimfire firearms (discontinued) ===
- Dragonfly: The Dragonfly is an integrally suppressed Ruger MK II pistol.
- Phoenix: The Phoenix is an integrally suppressed Ruger 10/22 rifle.

=== Pistol suppressors ===
- Illusion9 is an eccentric designed suppressor to utilize factory sights as well as allowing the use of rail mounted accessories on the host firearm
- Ti-Rant Series suppressors designed for use with either 9mm or .45 ACP caliber pistols that is made from Titanium. Short versions were manufactured using an "S" suffix in the model names and a modular 45 caliber suppressor known as the Ti-Rant 45M has replaced the standard and short versions of the 45 silencer.

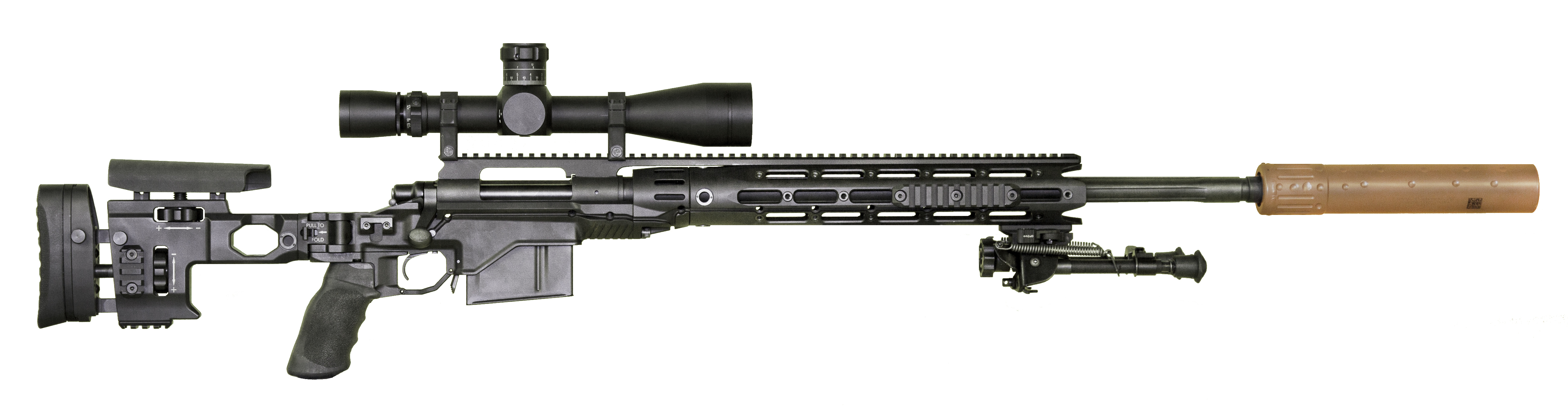
AAC TiTan suppressor mounted to early model XM2010 rifle

=== Rifle suppressors ===
- M4-2000 designed for use with firearms chambered for 5.56×45mm NATO/.223 Remington.
- 762-SDN-6 Fast attach 7.62 silencer optimized for the 300 AAC Blackout cartridge.

=== Muzzle devices ===
In 2011, AAC was awarded a $14,201,731 contract for the muzzle brakes that they produce known as the "Brakeout". This contract was procured via the Navy Electronic Commerce and Naval Surface Warfare Center Crane Division.

In 2016 the BlastOut gives users the ability to redirect muzzle blast forward when shooting unsuppressed.

=== .300 AAC Blackout ===
The .300 AAC Blackout cartridge was developed by Advanced Armament Corporation in cooperation with Remington Defense, under the direction of Kevin Brittingham. The round is very similar to the .300 Whisper cartridge created years earlier by SSK Industries, but AAC submitted the cartridge for SAAMI standardization and allows any manufacturer to use the specifications. This has led to far wider adoption than the .300 Whisper, which is proprietary to SSK. This round has the same overall length and width as the popular 5.56×45mm NATO round, except it fires a 30 caliber bullet allowing for better barrier penetration and external ballistics from short barrels. These dimensions allow the 300 AAC Blackout to be used in existing magazines designed for M16 or AR-15 rifles. Because the rim of the cartridge is identical, the same bolt and carrier can be used for both cartridges.

=== Rifles ===
- Honey Badger, a suppressed personal defense weapon based on the AR-15 and chambered in .300 AAC Blackout.
- MPW (Multi-Purpose Weapon), a rifle chambered in .300 AAC Blackout, made with 16" and 12.5" barrels.

== American Silencer Association ==
AAC was a founding member of the American Silencer Association (ASA), a nonprofit trade association "to further the pursuit of education, public relations, legislation, hunting applications and military applications for the silencer industry".
