= AGM-1 carbine =

- Type: Bullpup carbine
- Place of origin: Italy

Production history
- Designed: Mid-1980s
- Manufacturer: AL.GI.MEC.Srl, Via Melzi d'Eril 21, I-20154 Milan

Specifications
- Mass: 3.0 kg
- Length: 670 mm
- Barrel length: 410 mm
- Cartridge: 9×19mm Parabellum.45 ACP.22 Long Rifle; 9×21mm Italian
- Action: Blowback, closed bolt
- Feed system: 13- or 20-round detachable box magazine (9×19mm), 6- or 10-round magazine (.45 ACP), 15- or 20-round magazine (.22 LR)
- Sights: Two-position, flip aperture (rear), adjustable for elevation post (fore)

The AGM-1 is a bullpup, semi-automatic carbine produced in Italy. The carbine is readily convertible from 9×19mm Parabellum to .45 ACP as well as .22 Long Rifle. It features a set trigger and a heavy, target-type barrel. The magazines for the 9×19mm Parabellum variant are interchangeable with the Browning Hi-Power pistol.

== See also ==
- List of bullpup firearms
- List of carbines
