= Heckler & Koch MP7 =

German series of submachine guns/personal defence weapons

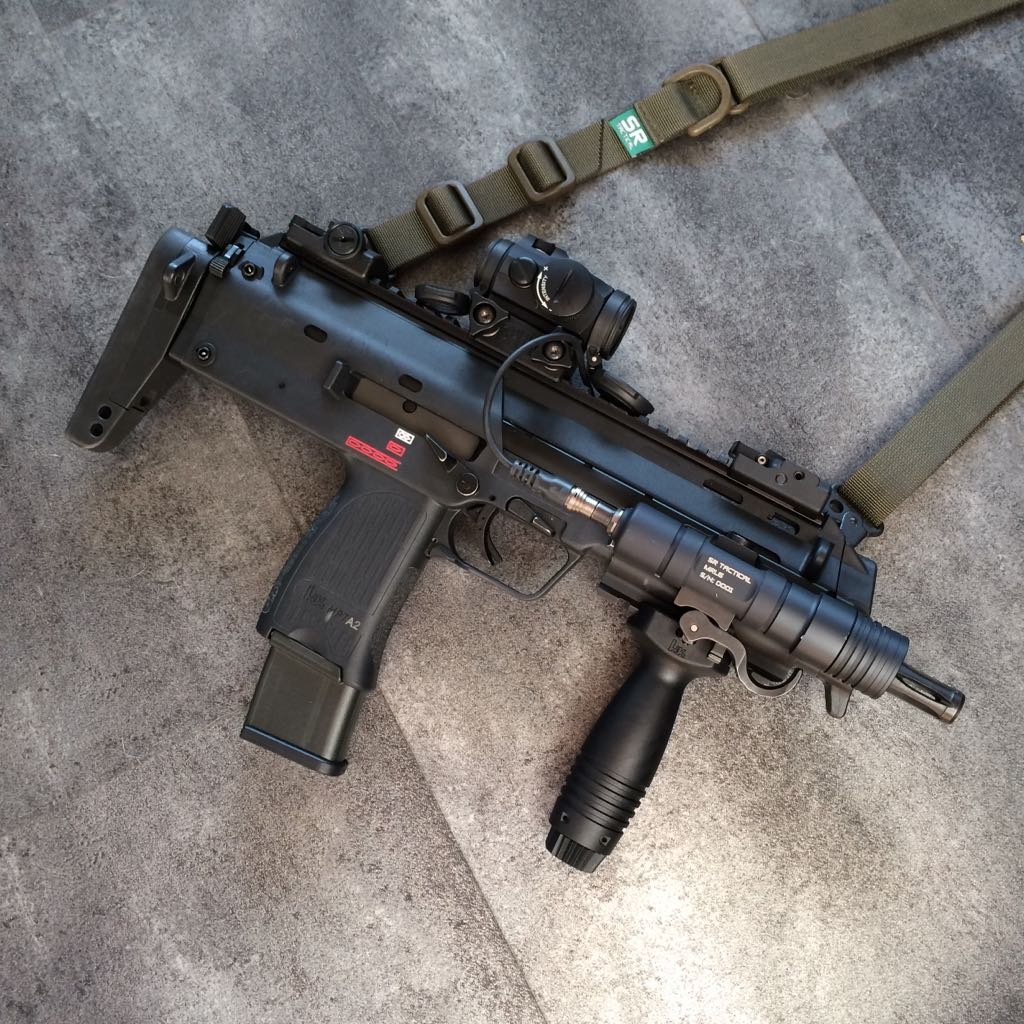
- MP7A2 with attachments, including a weapon light, weapon sling, and an Aimpoint Micro T2
- Type: Personal defense weapon Submachine gun
- Place of origin: Germany

Service history
- In service: 2001–present
- Used by: 20+ countries (see Users)
- Wars: War in Afghanistan; Iraq War; Operation Inherent Resolve; Operation Neptune Spear; Papua Conflict

Production history
- Manufacturer: Heckler & Koch
- Produced: 2001–present

Specifications
- Mass: 1.90 kg (4.2 lb) with 20-round empty magazine (PDW); 2.10 kg (4.63 lb) with magazine (MP7A1)
- Length: 638 mm (25.1 in) stock extended / 415 mm (16.3 in) stock collapsed
- Barrel length: 180 mm (7.1 in)
- Width: 51 mm (2.0 in)
- Height: 169.5 mm (6.7 in)
- Cartridge: HK 4.6×30mm
- Action: Gas-operated, short stroke piston, rotating bolt
- Rate of fire: 950 rounds/min
- Muzzle velocity: 735 m/s (2,411 ft/s) (Fiocchi CPS Black Tip ammunition)
- Effective firing range: 200 m (660 ft)
- Feed system: 20-, 30- or 40-round detachable box magazine
- Sights: Tritium-illuminated flip-up night sights; handgun and rifle sights (adjustable)

The Heckler & Koch MP7 (German: Maschinenpistole 7) is a personal defense weapon chambered for the HK 4.6×30mm armor-piercing cartridge designed by German defence manufacturer Heckler & Koch.

== History ==
It was designed (together with the new cartridge) to meet NATO requirements published in 1989, which called for an SMG-type weapon with a greater capacity to defeat Kevlar body armor (versus pre-existing submachine guns using conventional pistol cartridges such as the .45 ACP and 9×19mm Parabellum).

The MP7 went into production in 2001, and is a direct rival to the FN P90, also developed in response to NATO's requirement by Belgian company FN Herstal. The weapon has been revised since its introduction and the latest production variants are the MP7A1 and MP7A2. Exact production numbers for the HK MP7 are not publicly available.

== Design details ==
The MP7 utilizes a short-stroke piston gas system as is used on H&K's G36 and HK416 in place of a blowback system traditionally seen on submachine guns. The 4.6×30mm ammunition is exclusive to the gun and offers low recoil. This ammunition is unique among submachine guns in that the bullet is made almost entirely of a hardened steel penetrator instead of softer copper or lead. The MP7 has a cyclic rate of fire of around 950 rounds per minute (which is around 15.8 rounds per second).

The MP7 allows a conventional 20, 30 or 40-round box magazine to be fitted within the pistol grip (the 20-round magazine is comparable in size to a 15-round 9×19mm magazine, while the 40-round magazine compares to a 30-round 9×19mm magazine). It features an ambidextrous fire selector, bolt catch lever and magazine release. It has an extendable stock and a folding front grip (MP7 and MP7A1 variants, the MP7A2 lacks the folding front grip); it can be fired either one-handed or two-handed. It is compact and light, due to the use of polymers in its construction.

=== Ammunition ===
The MP7's specially designed armor piercing (AP) high-velocity rounds consist of either copper-plated solid steel (DM11), alloy-plated steel jacket (DM21) or copper-alloy-jacketed lead core projectiles (Fiocchi FMJ ZP). Standard AP high-velocity DM11 (Ultimate Combat) round with a 2.0-g (31 gr) projectile has a muzzle velocity of 720 m/s (2,362 ft/s) and a muzzle energy of 506 J (373 ft-lb). The DM11 round penetrates the NATO CRISAT target (20 layers of Kevlar with 1.6 mm titanium backing) at 200 m. The round has a small diameter, allowing for redoubling penetration capability and high capacity in a very small magazine.

VBR of Belgium produces a 4.6×30mm two-part controlled-fragmenting projectile that is claimed to increase the content of the permanent wound cavity and double the chance to hit a vital organ.

Heckler & Koch claims that the CPS Black Tip ammunition made by Fiocchi has a muzzle energy of approximately 525 J, which would be comparable to 9×19mm Parabellum rounds.

=== Accessories ===
The MP7 features a full-length, top-mounted Picatinny rail that comes as standard with folding fore and rear iron sights attached. When the sights are folded flat, they resemble Patridge style open sights. Folded up, they feature aperture sights. The sights can easily be removed by loosening a single screw and lifting them off. Besides iron sights, other optics such as a red dot sight or a scope can also be mounted on the top picatinny rail. The MP7 is also usually fitted with additional rails on both sides of the barrel, which allows the MP7 to be mounted with other accessories such us a laser aiming module (LAM), tactical flashlights, and more, without obscuring the view while aiming. The MP7 can also accept a suppressor, and its tailor-made suppressor does not interfere with its accuracy or rate of fire.

== Variants ==
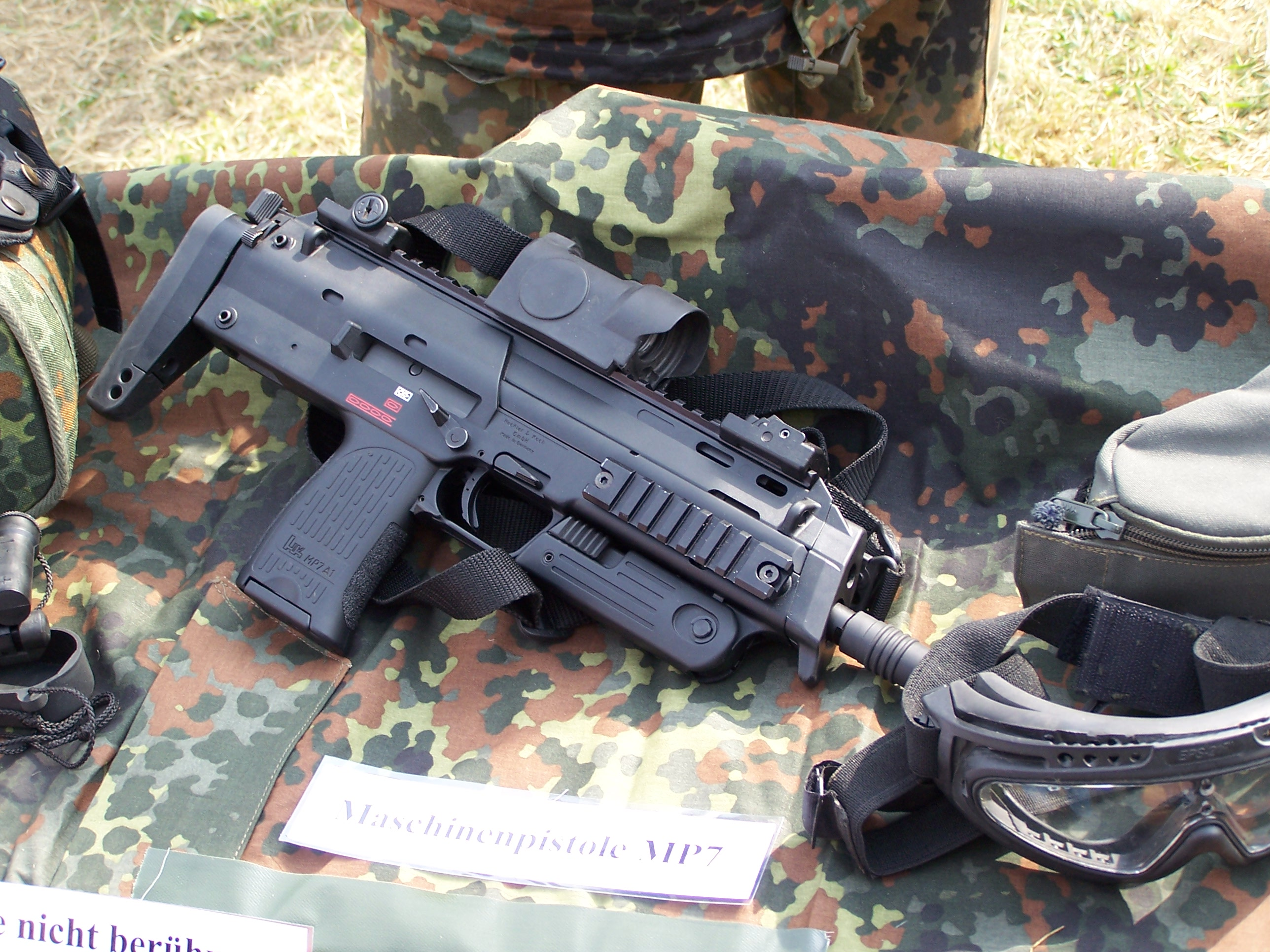
A recent production MP7A1 (note the safety trigger) with a Zeiss RSA reflex red dot sight on display as part of Germany's IdZ program.

=== PDW ===
The first prototype was shown in 1999 through the 1999 SHOT Show and was designated as the 'PDW' (Personal Defense Weapon). It had a short Picatinny rail on the top and a smooth pistol grip surface.

=== MP7 ===
In 2001, it was designated as the 'MP7' and went into production. Changes include a full-length Picatinny rail, a thick curved stock and an anti-slide surface on the pistol grip much like the HK USP. It also features folding iron sights mounted on the Picatinny rail and the button to fold the foregrip was made larger for easier operation.

=== MP7A1 ===
In 2003, its designation was changed to 'MP7A1' and featured a redesigned pistol grip with a different surface and curved shape, a smaller stock with a straight buttpad, side-mounted picatinny rails as standard and the folding iron sights were made more compact. The weapon was made slightly longer, but because the stock was shortened, the overall length did not change.

The stock is also able to be locked into 3 positions. Recent MP7A1 models have a trigger safety similar to a Glock pistol; the middle section of the trigger must be pulled first before the outer part will move. This helps to stop accidental discharges if the trigger is bumped.

=== MP7A2 ===
MP7A1 variant without the folding front grip but features a Picatinny rail to mount various grips in line with the user's preference.

=== MP7-SF ===
A semi-automatic only variant of the MP7 which is currently used by the Ministry of Defence Police in the United Kingdom.

=== Clones ===
==== T7 Pistol ====
MP7 clone by Tommy Built Tactical, unveiled at SHOT Show 2024. It can be sold as a pistol or as a Short-barreled rifle.

==== AMK MP7 ====
3D printable lookalike by Deterrence Dispensed, available in 5.7×28mm and 9×19mm

==== UO Arms NT7 ====
Civilian clone of MP7 made by UO Arms, revealed in September 2026.

== Users ==
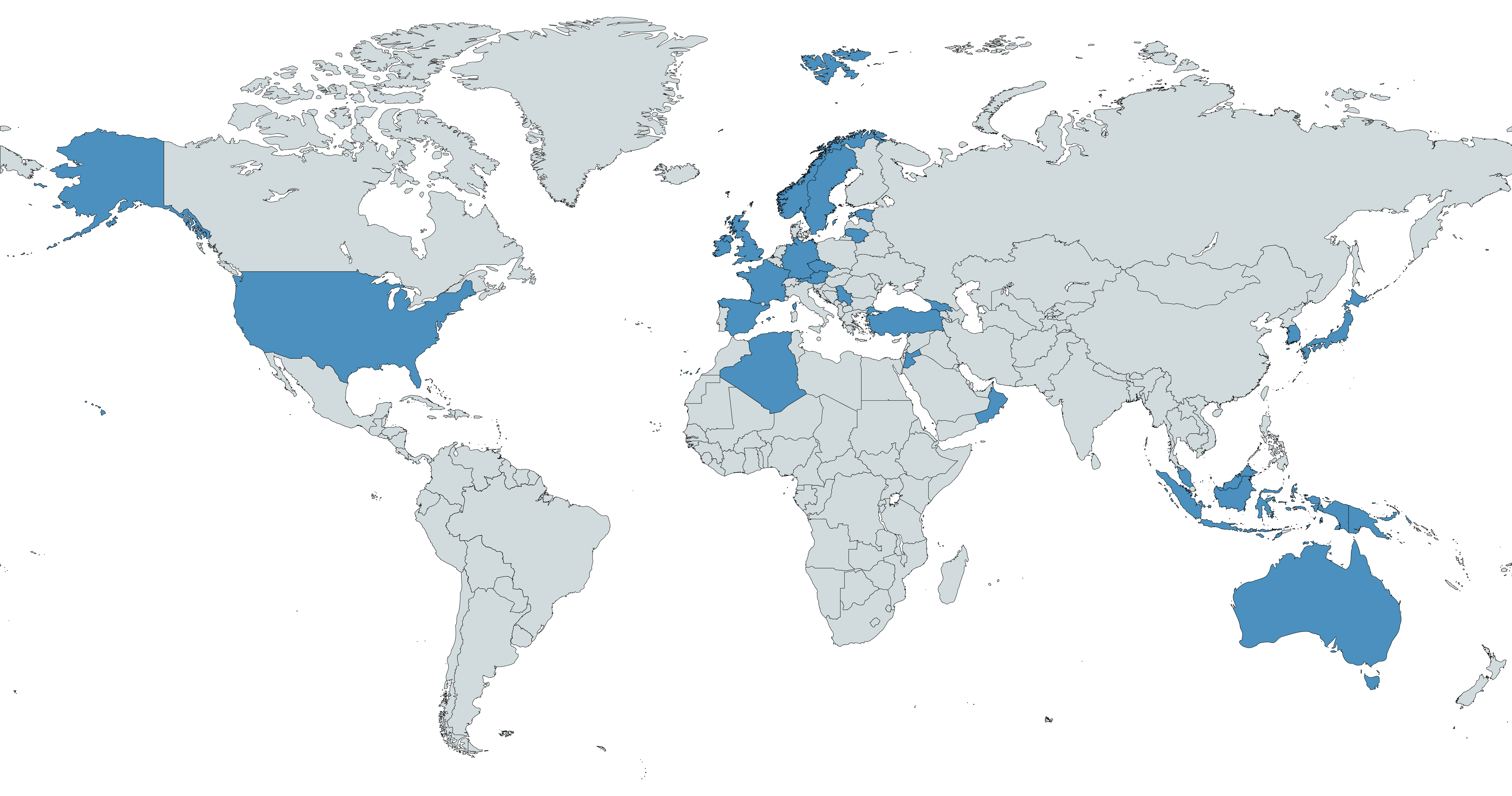
A map with Heckler & Koch MP7 users in blue

Country	Organization name	Model	Quantity	Date	Reference
Algeria	Algerian special forces, DSI, DGSPP	−	−	−	
Australia	Western Australian Department of Justice Special Operations Group	−	−	−	
Austria	Einsatzkommando Cobra (EKO Cobra) of the Austrian Federal Ministry of the Interior	−	−	−	
Brunei	Special Forces Regiment of the Royal Brunei Armed Forces	MP7A1	−	−	
Czech Republic	Police of the Czech Republic – PDW of ordinary police officers – guns are locked in a special compartment of ordinary police cars' front doors	MP7A1	−	2012	
Estonia	ESTSOF	−	−	−	
France	French special forces, DGSE SA, GIGN	MP7A1	−	−	
Georgia	Ministry of Internal Affairs	−	−	−	
Germany	German Army	−	−	−	
Germany	GSG9 der Bundespolizei counter-terrorism group of the German Federal Police	−	−	−	
Germany	Baden-Württemberg Police	−	3000	−	
Germany	Missions Abroad and Special Operations unit of the Bundeskriminalamt	_	_	_	
Indonesia	Komando Pasukan Khusus (KOPASSUS) special forces of the Indonesian Army	MP7A1	−	pre-2012	
Ireland	Garda; Special Detective Unit, Emergency Response Unit, Armed Support Unit, National Bureau of Criminal Investigation	MP7A1	−	2006	
Japan	Japanese Special Forces Group	−	−	−	
Jordan	Jordan Royal Guard, 71st Special Battalion	−	−	−	
Lithuania	Lithuanian Armed Forces	−	−	2023	
Malaysia	Pasukan Gerakan Khas (PGK) counter-terrorism divisions of the Royal Malaysia Police	−	−	2007	
Norway	Norwegian Armed Forces	−	6,500	2007	
Norway	Norwegian Police Security Service (PST) and the Royal Police Escort	−	−	−	
Oman	−	−	−	−	
Pakistan	Pakistan Armed Forces	−	−	−	
Papua New Guinea	Parliament security	MP7A1	−	−	
Romania	Romanian Intelligence Service’s Brigada Antiterorista	MP7	−	−	
Serbia	Serbian Special Forces	MP7A1	−	−	
South Korea	Republic of Korea National Police Agency SWAT	−	−	−	
South Korea	Presidential Security Service	−	−	−	
Spain	Spanish Army	−	−	−	
Sweden	Swedish Army	−	−	2018	
Turkey	Special Forces Command	MP7A1	−	−	
United Kingdom	Ministry of Defence Police	MP7-SF	−	−	
United States	Nephi City Police	−	−	−	
United States	United States Capitol Police	MP7A1	−	−	
United States	United States Naval Special Warfare Development Group	−	−	−	
United States	Federal Bureau of Investigation	MP7A1	-	-	
United States	Colorado Springs Police Tactical Enforcement Unit	−	−	−	
Vatican City	Pontifical Swiss Guard	MP7A1	−	−	

== Gallery ==
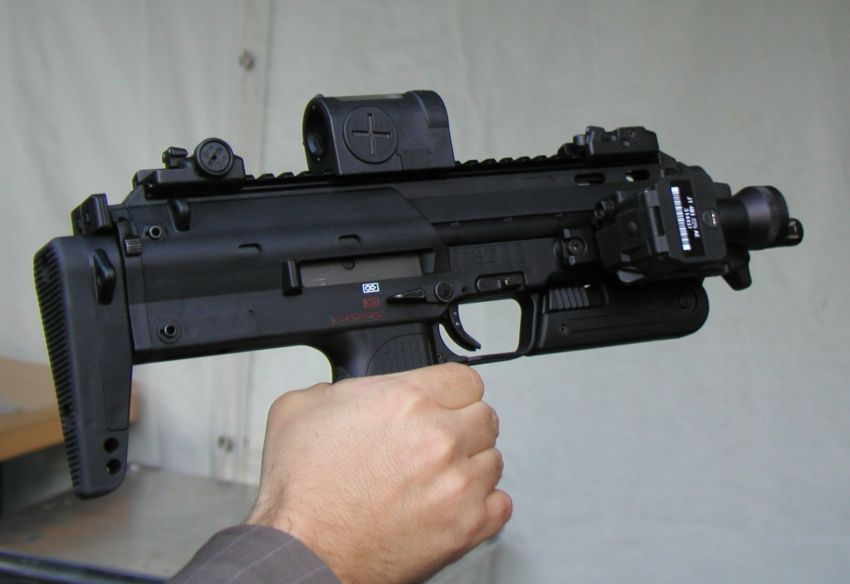
An MP7A1 with Zeiss RSA reflex red dot sight and LLM01 laser light module.

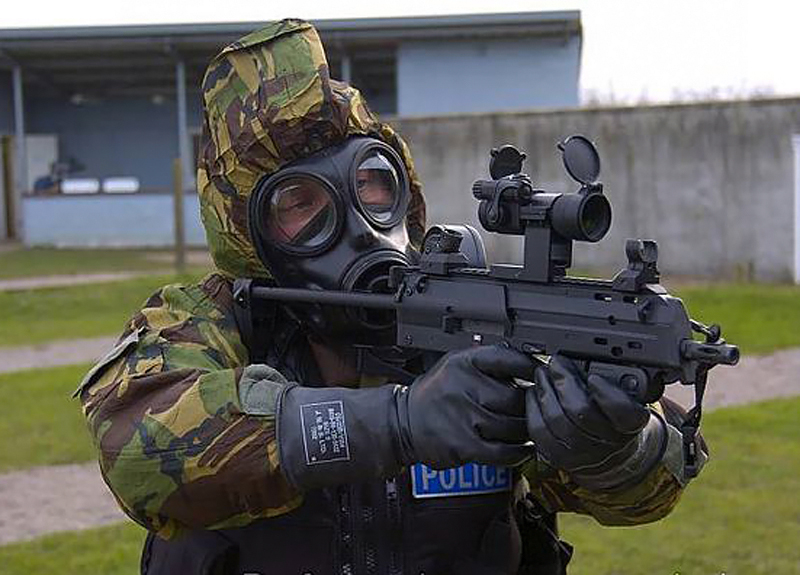
MoD Police officer on range with an MP7-SF in CBRN suit.

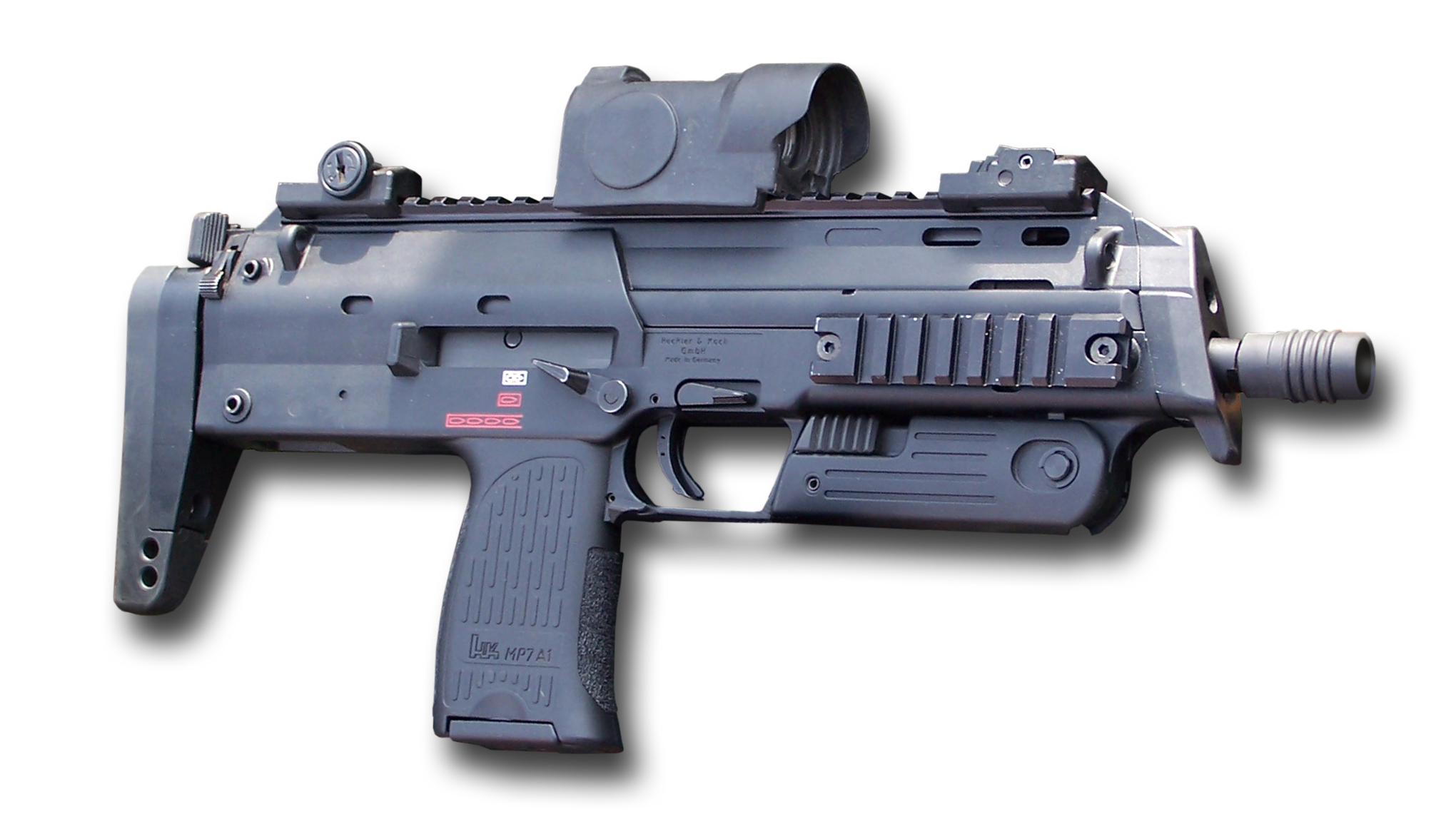
MP7A1 (note the safety trigger) with a Zeiss RSA reflex red dot sight.

== Heckler & Koch UCP ==
Heckler & Koch UCP
- Type: Semi-automatic pistol
- Place of origin: Germany

Specifications
- Mass: 0.85 kg (1.9 lb)
- Length: 200 mm (7.9 in)
- Barrel length: 130 mm (5.1 in)
- Width: 30 mm (1.2 in)
- Height: 135 mm (5.3 in)
- Cartridge: HK 4.6×30mm
- Action: Delayed blowback
- Muzzle velocity: 695 m/s (2,280 ft/s)
- Effective firing range: 70 m (230 ft)
- Feed system: 20-round box magazine
- Sights: Iron

The Heckler & Koch Universal Combat Pistol (HK UCP), also known as the HK P46, is a double action, semi-automatic handgun developed under commission for the German Bundeswehr. The concept for the UCP was later cancelled at the prototype stage.

=== History ===
The UCP was to be the companion sidearm to the HK MP7, using the same HK 4.6×30mm cartridge. The 4.6×30mm round is a direct competitor to the 5.7×28mm by Fabrique Nationale de Herstal (FN). As such, the UCP would have been a direct competitor to the FN Five-seven pistol. Both have greater armor-piercing capabilities and less recoil compared to other commonly used military handgun cartridges, such as the 9×18mm Makarov and 9×19mm Parabellum.

The proliferation of cheap yet effective soft body armor has begun to make guns that fire pistol ammunition (such as Heckler & Koch's earlier MP5 submachine gun and USP pistol) ineffective. In response to this trend, Heckler & Koch designed the MP7 (along with the cancelled UCP pistol, which was to use the same ammunition) to penetrate soft body armor while being small enough to be used in place of either a pistol or a submachine gun.

=== Design ===
The UCP operated on the delayed-blowback operating principle. The external design of the UCP appears to have been borrowed from the HK P2000 pistol, and includes ambidextrous controls, interchangeable backstraps, and a Picatinny rail system for the attachment of accessories. Like the USP and P2000 series of pistols, the trigger mechanism is reported to have been modular and capable of different configurations. The UCP was designed to accept an extended, threaded barrel capable of accepting the attachment of a sound suppressor made by Brügger & Thomet.

The design remained in the prototype phase as of 2006, and had been reported as entering limited trials with the Bundeswehr.

In July 2009, HK USA's president, Wayne Weber, indicated that the UCP project has been cancelled because "HK felt it did not provide adequate ballistics in handgun form."

== See also ==
- Joint Venture Protective Carbine
- AO-46 (firearm)
