= Colt SCAMP =

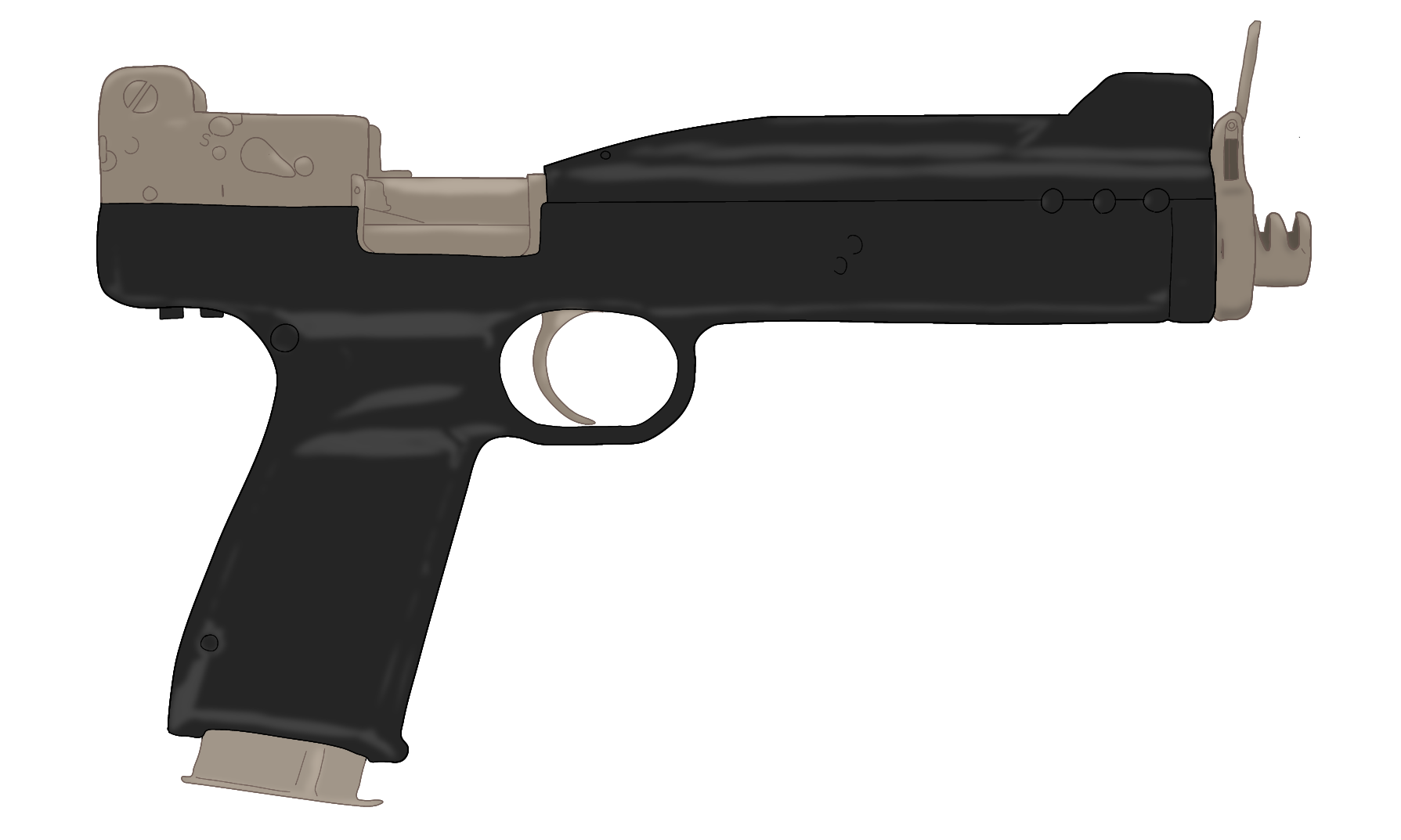
- Colt SCAMP
- Type: Machine pistol Personal defense weapon
- Place of origin: United States

Production history
- Designer: Henry A. Into
- Designed: 1971
- Manufacturer: Colt
- Produced: 1971

Specifications
- Mass: 2.25 pounds (1.02 kg) (Empty); 3.24 pounds (1.47 kg) (Loaded)
- Length: 11.41 inches (29.0 cm)
- Barrel length: 9.12 inches (23.2 cm)
- Cartridge: .22 Scamp (5.56×29mm)
- Action: Recoil
- Effective firing range: 147.6 feet (45.0 m)
- Maximum firing range: 5,659.4 feet (1,725.0 m)
- Feed system: 27-round magazine

The Colt SCAMP (Small CAliber Machine Pistol) was conceived in 1969 as a replacement to the aging Colt M1911A1 pistol.

== Design ==
The resulting weapon, embodied in a single SCAMP prototype built in 1971, was designed to give an individual operator a huge increase in firepower, with only a slight bump in weight and bulk. Both the pistol and the unique ammunition developed for the pistol, were shopped unsuccessfully around to the military through 1974. Though people who tested the SCAMP were impressed, no official interest developed. An article in Small Arms Review magazine reports the prototype remains in the Colt archival vault.

Colt design engineer Henry A. Into recalled that they wanted a selective-fire weapon as the basis of their replacement for the M1911A1. Colt designers looked at the smallest submachine guns of the day (including the Czech Škorpion vz. 61, and Uzi), and tinkered with making full-auto versions of high-magazine-capacity pistols (such as the Browning Hi-Power). They eventually settled on an in-house design, Into recalled, which was a gas-operated, locked-breech weapon with select-fire capability, including three-shot burst. The SCAMP's magazine had a similar capacity to a submachine gun, of 27 rounds.

SCAMP was designed to be controllable and accurate to fire. As such, it featured grips patterned after those found on target pistols, a bore set low over the hand to lower the center of gravity, and a burst-fire mode to allow multiple shots without the problem of prolonged recoil. There was also a recoil compensator built into the muzzle.

The requirement for accuracy led to the design of an original cartridge for the SCAMP. The .223-caliber rifle cartridge was initially considered, but was rejected as too powerful for use in a handgun. The 9mm Parabellum round was also rejected for having a relatively heavy recoil, Into said in an interview. Into also rejected the .22 Winchester Magnum, 5-mm. Remington, and .22 Hornet.

The design team eventually settled on the .221 Remington Fireball as the basis of their new cartridge, leading to the design of a .224-caliber centerfire cartridge known as the .22 SCAMP. This round was somewhat shorter and narrower than the Fireball.

Despite positive reviews by the few military personnel who got to test the SCAMP, the ultimate response was the military was not looking to replace the M1911A1 pistol at the time. Another source states the Army rejected the SCAMP in 1971 because it was already working on a parallel development, the 'Personal Defense Weapon'. The Colt .45 ACP would not be replaced until 1985.

The SCAMP's cartridge was later rimmed so it could be used in revolvers, intended as a weapon for security forces. This also didn't sell.

== See also ==
- List of individual weapons of the U.S. Armed Forces (Sidearms)
