= Chauchat-Ribeyrolles 1918 submachine gun =

French prototype automatic weapon

Chauchat-Ribeyrolles 1918 Automatic Carbine
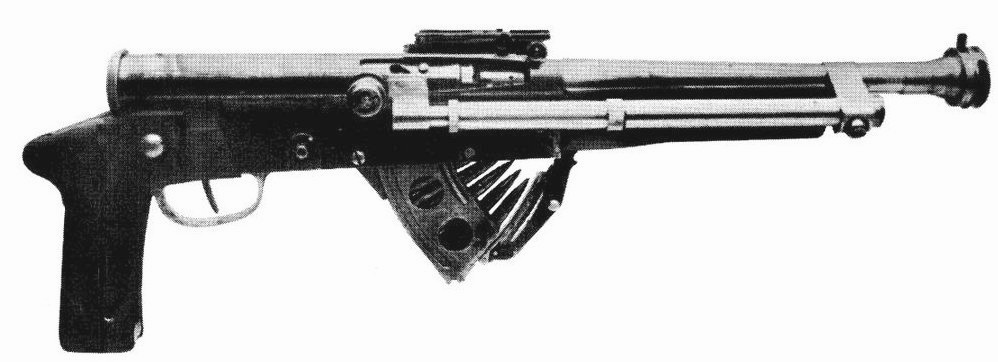
- The Chauchat-Ribeyrolles 1918 submachine gun using a Mannlicher–Berthier clip
- Type: Submachine gun Personal defense weapon
- Place of origin: France

Production history
- Designer: Ribeyrolles, Sutter and Chauchat (RSC)
- Designed: 1918
- Manufacturer: Ribeyrolles, Sutter and Chauchat (RSC)

Specifications
- Mass: 4 kilograms (8.8 lb)
- Length: 57.5 centimetres (22.6 in)
- Barrel length: 34.0 centimetres (13.4 in)
- Cartridge: 8mm Lebel (8×50mm R)
- Caliber: 8mm
- Barrels: 1
- Feed system: 8-round Mannlicher–Berthier clip (early models); 16-round box magazine (later models)

The Chauchat-Ribeyrolles 1918 submachine gun is a French prototype automatic weapon.

In 1917, the French Army adopted the Mle. 1917 semi-automatic rifle made by Ribeyrolles, Sutter and Chauchat (RSC), who already developed the "Chauchat" Mle. 1915 LMG.

In 1918, they presented a "pistolet-mitrailleur" (submachine gun), meant to be used for close-range protection for the French tank crews. The weapon is based on the RSC Mle. 1917 semi-automatic rifle mechanism. The first trials used a Mannlicher–Berthier clip holding eight cartridges. The trials continued until 1919 with a weapon using the same magazine as the Chauchat. The results were satisfactory but the weapon was too powerful for the intended self-protection use. A mix of standard and tracer bullets was planned to be used to assist in aiming.

== See also ==
- Ribeyrolles 1918 automatic carbine
- M231 Firing Port Weapon
