= ST Kinetics CPW =

Compact Personal Weapon
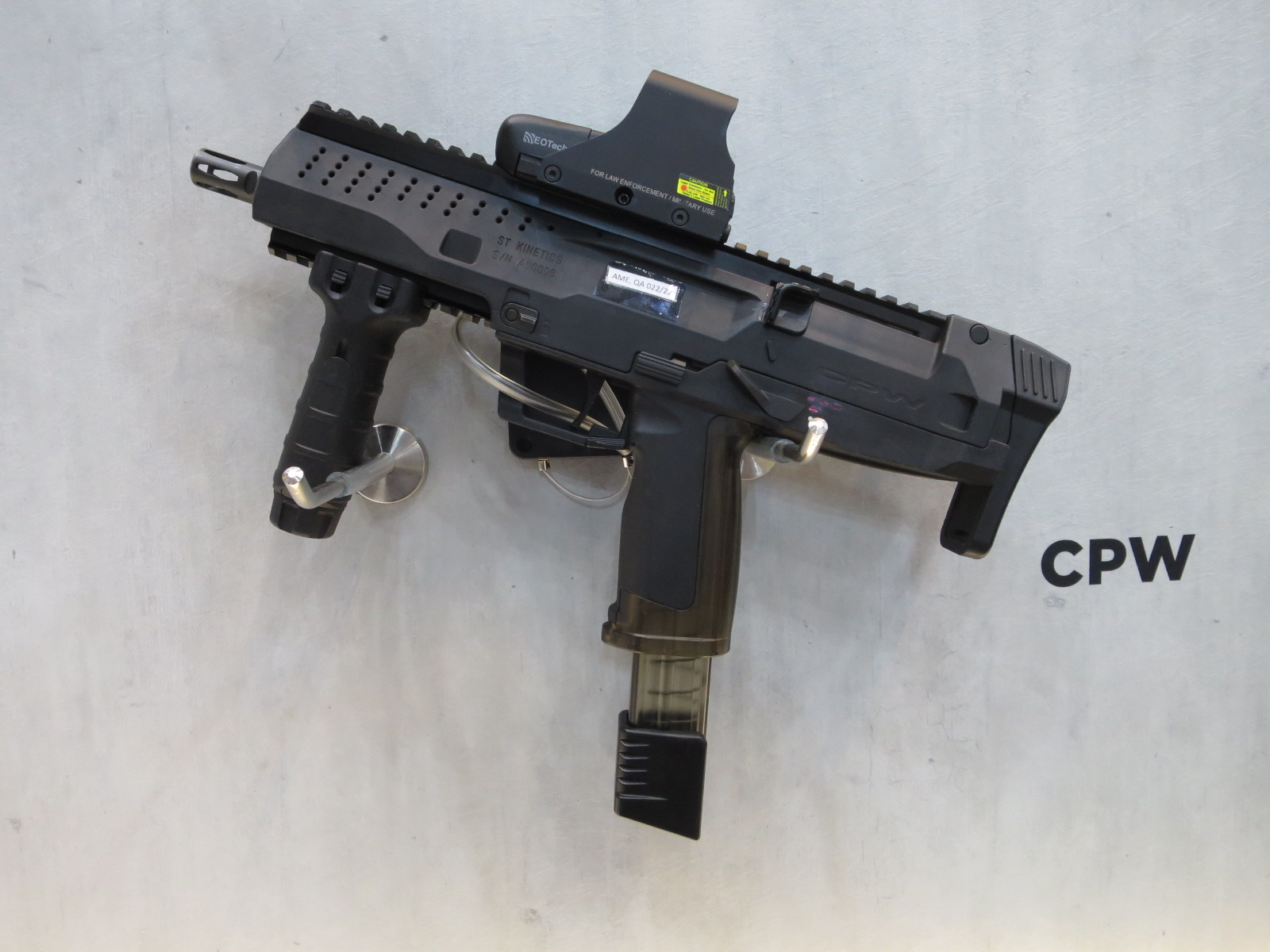
- ST Kinetics CPW with an EOTech at IDEX 2023
- Type: Personal defense weapon Submachine gun Machine pistol
- Place of origin: Singapore

Service history
- In service: 2009-present

Production history
- Designer: ST Kinetics
- Designed: 2008
- Manufacturer: ST Engineering (formerly ST Kinetics)

Specifications
- Mass: 1.5 kg (3.31 lb)
- Length: 500 mm (19.7 in) stock extended 350 mm (13.8 in) stock folded
- Barrel length: 180 mm (7.1 in)
- Cartridge: 9×19mm Parabellum; FN 5.7×28mm HK 4.6×30mm
- Action: Lever-delayed blowback
- Rate of fire: 900–1,100 rounds/min
- Effective firing range: 100 m (9×19mm Parabellum)
- Feed system: 30-round plastic box magazine
- Sights: None; MIL-STD-1913 rail provided for optics

The CPW (Compact Personal Weapon) is a multi-caliber submachine gun developed by ST Kinetics as a PDW-class firearm.

== Design details ==
The CPW is a modular selective fire lever-delayed blowback operated weapon (using what STK calls a cam recoil mitigation mechanism), which contributes to the low felt recoil and allows for use with high pressure ammunition.

=== Ergonomics ===
The weapon has a conventional submachine gun layout with the magazine housed in the pistol grip. The pistol grip's backstrap and the 30-round magazine are molded from a translucent plastic which allows the shooter to quickly verify the remaining level of ammunition visually.

The receiver is machined from a lightweight aluminum alloy and most of the other components are made of a high-strength polymer to further reduce weight and costs.

The barrel and bolt assembly can be quickly replaced, converting the submachine gun to the small-caliber armor-piercing PDW ammunition.

Two Picatinny rails are provided in the CPW for mounting sights and tactical accessories – one continuous rail runs across the top of the receiver and a second shorter accessory rail is installed under the barrel, in front of the trigger guard.

The top rail can accommodate conventional iron sights or optoelectronic sighting devices such as reflex sights. The bottom rail is intended primarily for laser aiming modules, vertical grips and flashlights.

=== Control ===
The CPW is fully ambidextrous. Every lever, control or toggle has been mirrored on the opposite side of the receiver – this includes the cocking handle, the fire control selector/manual safety switch (installed above the pistol grip) as well as the bolt release lever, which is used to slam the bolt closed after inserting a new magazine. The ejection port is located on the right side of the weapon.

The CPW has a collapsible metal stock that provides stability during aimed fire. When collapsed, the weapon is not much larger than a conventional pistol, allowing for easy handling and concealment; the CPW can be carried in a holster.

=== Ammunition ===
The prototype is chambered in 9×19mm Parabellum, but the manufacturer assures that the weapon's modular design allows for a simple caliber conversion to either 5.7×28mm or 4.6×30mm.

== Users ==
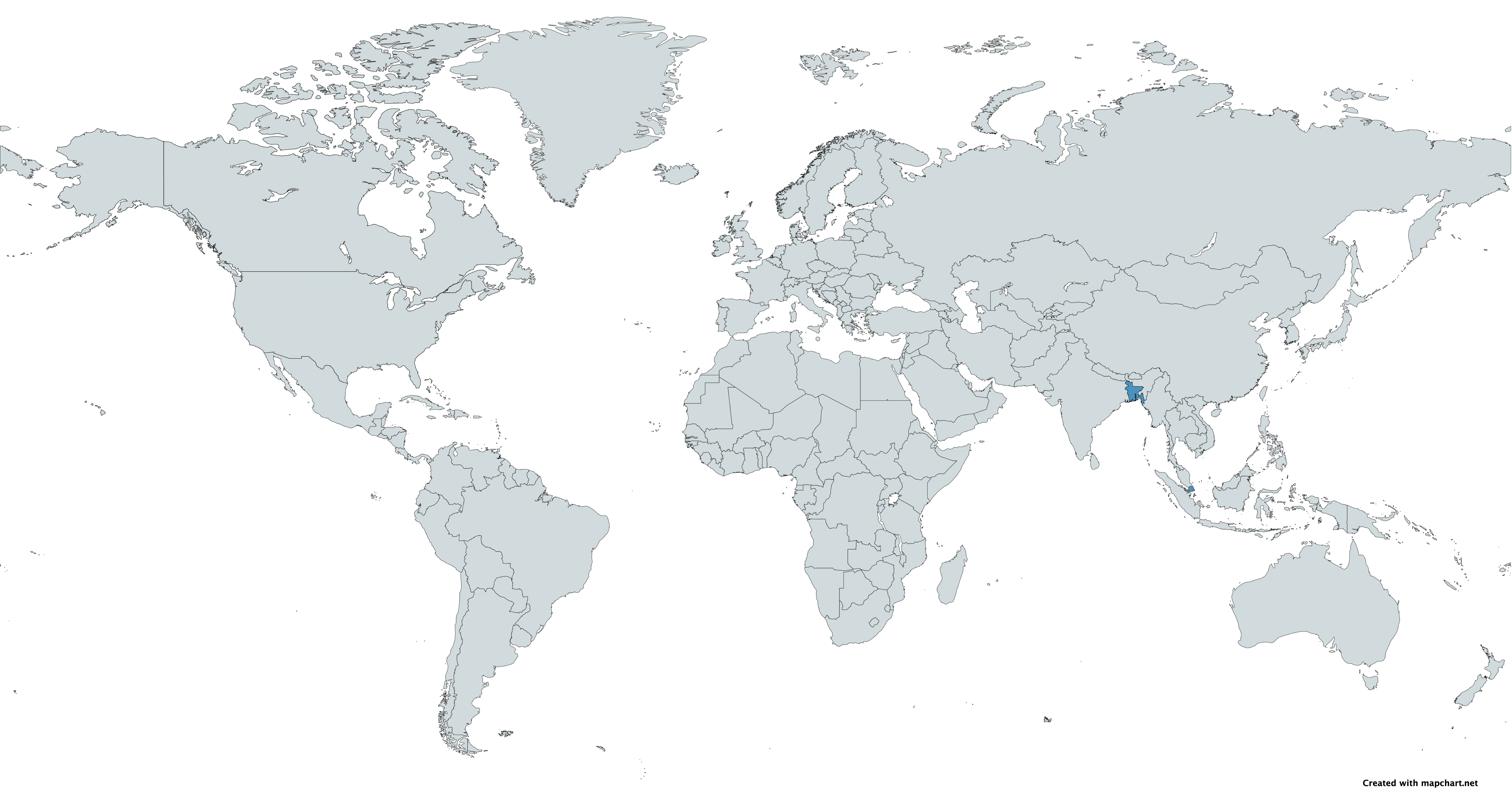
A map with ST Kinetics CPW users in blue

- Bangladesh: As of 2019, used in limited numbers by special police units.
