= Knight's Armament Company PDW =

Knights Armament Company PDW
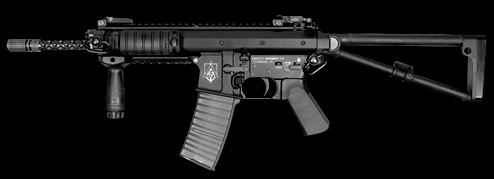
- 10-inch barrel length variant with a foregrip
- Type: Personal defense weapon, rifle, carbine
- Place of origin: United States

Production history
- Designer: Knight's Armament Company
- Designed: 2006
- Manufacturer: Knight's Armament Company
- Produced: 2006-????

Specifications
- Mass: 4.5 lb (2.0 kg)
- Length: 28 in (710 mm) overall 19.5 in (500 mm) with stock folded
- Barrel length: 254 mm (10.0 in); 203 mm (8.0 in) barrel available
- Cartridge: 6×35mm, .300 Whisper/.300 Blackout
- Action: Gas-operated, rotating bolt
- Muzzle velocity: 2,425 ft/s (739 m/s) with 10-inch (250 mm) barrel
- Effective firing range: 250-300 m
- Feed system: 30-round detachable box magazine
- Sights: Iron sights

The Knight's Armament Company 6×35mm PDW is an experimental personal defense weapon designed by Knight's Armament Company (KAC), firing a 6mm cartridge optimized for short barrel weapons.

== History ==
The weapon was formally introduced as a prototype at the 2006 NDIA small arms symposium, in Albuquerque, New Mexico. Some writers were shown samples at the earlier 2006 SHOT Show.

== Design ==
The KAC's lower receiver, holding the magazine and trigger assembly, is essentially a shortened M16 rifle lower receiver, which makes the basic operating controls familiar to many potential users. However, the cartridge, upper receiver, and operating mechanism are all new designs by KAC.

The KAC PDW uses a completely side-folding stock, unlike the M16 and M4 designs which have their main operating spring in a tube in the stock, and therefore can only partially telescope, and not fold sideways at all, unless specialized hardware is installed.

The KAC PDW has two gas pistons tapping hot gas from the barrel to operate its mechanism, located on the top left and right sides of the bolt carrier. The single mainspring is located on top, between the two gas pistons.

The weapon was offered either with an 8-inch (203mm) or 10-inch (250mm) barrel.

=== Ammunition ===
The KAC PDW fires proprietary 6×35 mm cartridge, which is over a centimeter shorter than the 5.56×45mm NATO round.

The 6mm bullet is slightly wider, and the standard 6×35mm bullet slightly heavier, than the standard 5.56mm bullet (65 grains (4.2 g) versus 62 grains (4.0 g)).

Fired from a 10-inch (250 mm) barrel, KAC claims that the 6×35mm cartridge reaches a muzzle velocity of 2,450 ft/s (750 m/s), slightly faster than the muzzle velocity of a 5.56 mm cartridge fired from a similarly short barrel.

The larger diameter, shorter 6 mm cartridge is optimized for these shorter barrel lengths, and would perform less efficiently from rifle-length barrels. The round's muzzle energy is 831 ft⋅lbf (1,127 J) versus 792 ft⋅lbf (1,074 J) for a 5.56 mm bullet, again from the same 10" standard barrel.

A variant chambered in .300 AAC Blackout is also available.
