= Personal defense weapon =

Self-defense firearm

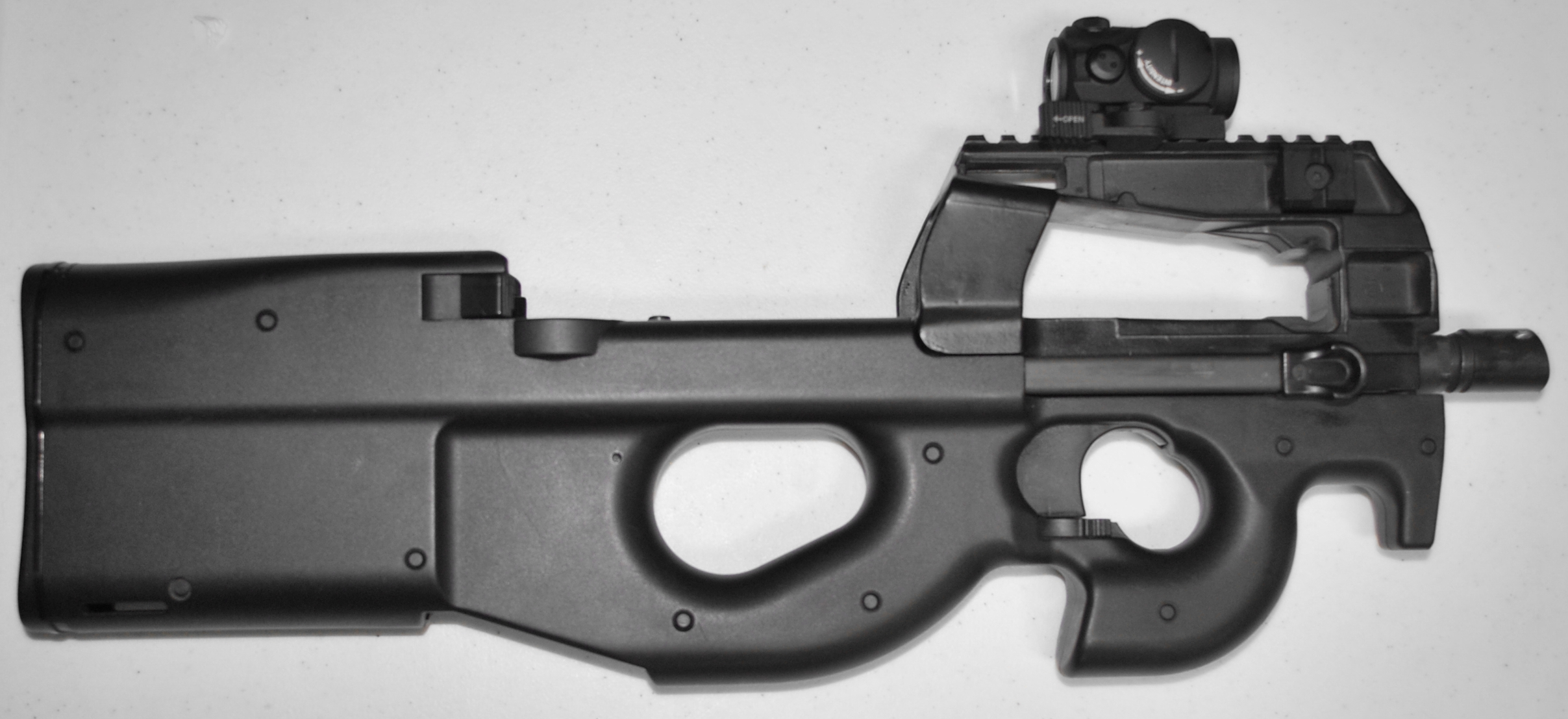
The FN P90, one of the most well-known personal defense weapons (PDW)

Personal defense weapons (PDWs) are compact magazine-fed automatic firearms, typically performing as a submachine gun designed for secondary defensive use rather than as a primary service weapon. Some PDWs fire a small-caliber (generally less than 8 mm or 0.31 in in bullet diameter), high-velocity centerfire bottleneck cartridge resembling a scaled-down intermediate cartridge, essentially making them an "in-between" hybrid between a submachine gun and a conventional carbine assault rifle.

The name describes the weapon's original conceptual role: as a compact but powerful small arm that can be conveniently carried for personal defense, usually by support personnel behind the front line such as military engineers, logistic drivers, medical specialists, artillery crews, or signallers. These "second-line" personnel are not strictly combat troops expected to directly engage the enemy, but may still be at risk of encountering decently equipped (and often well-armored) hostile skirmishers and infiltrators, therefore having to defend themselves in close quarters. Such encounters were thought to warrant an effective weapon that would have sufficient range for engagements that exceed handgun capabilities, but without the unnecessary bulk of a full-sized service rifle causing a burden during their normal duties. However, the concept has generally proven unsuccessful for this application, with carbines still being widely preferred for these roles.

== History ==
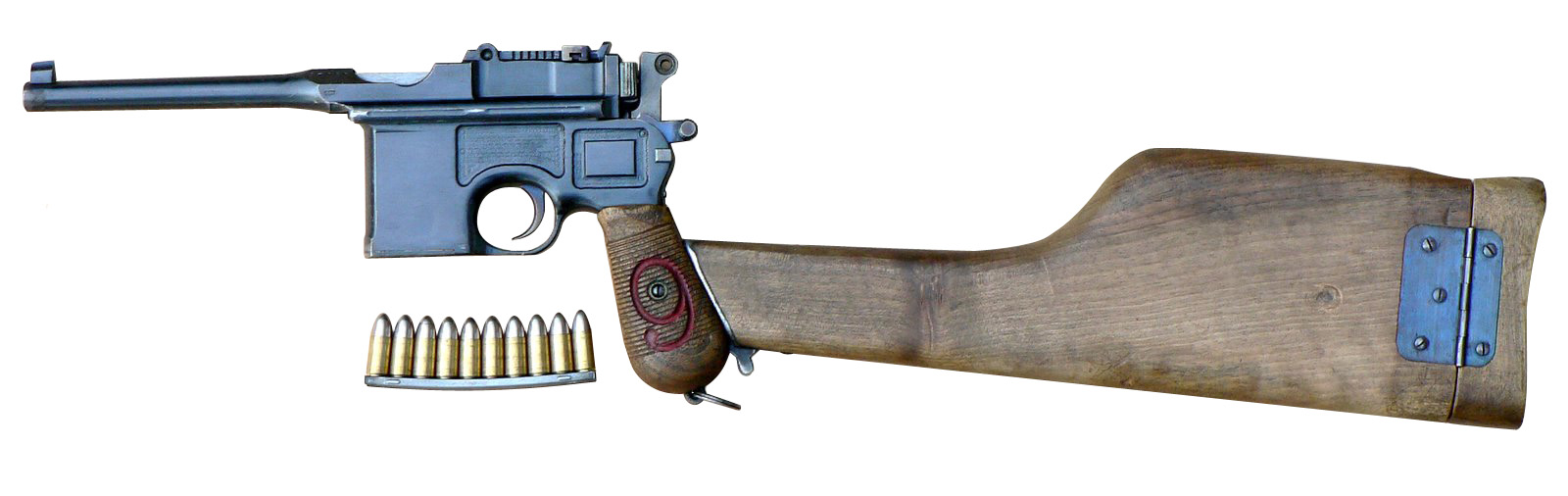
9mm Parabellum "Red 9" Mauser C96 with stock

In the late 19th and early 20th centuries, shortened versions of the infantry rifle were issued as "carbines" for cavalry troops and gun crews. This designation was dropped as infantry rifle designs became shortened overall, such as in the Short Magazine Lee–Enfield rifle. Thereafter, handguns were typically issued as self-defense weapons. However, they were not effective in most close combat situations. As a result, during the First World War, the Mauser C96 and artillery versions of the Luger pistol were issued with attachable shoulder stock holsters, which allowed for greater control and accuracy.

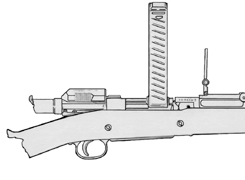
Pedersen device drawing

During World War I, the United States secretly developed the Pedersen device attachment for the M1903 Springfield rifle that allowed it to fire the .30-18 Auto (7.65×20mm Longue) pistol cartridge in semi-automatic mode. This attachment was developed to allow an infantryman to convert "his rifle to a form of submachine gun or automatic rifle" in approximately 15 seconds.

Production of the device and modified M1903 rifles started in 1918. However, the war ended before they were sent to Europe. The contract was cancelled on March 1, 1919, after production of 65,000 devices, 1.6 million magazines, 65 million cartridges and 101,775 modified Springfield rifles. The Pedersen device was declared surplus in 1931. To prevent them from falling into the hands of the lawless, nearly all of the stored devices were destroyed by the Army except for a few examples kept by Ordnance Department.

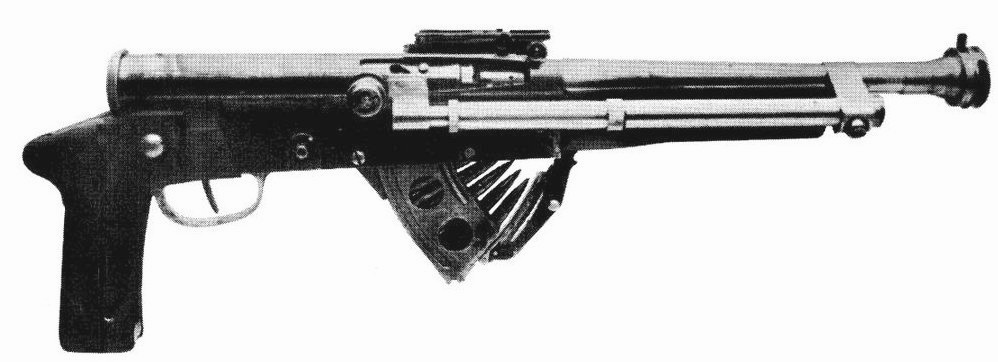
The Chauchat-Ribeyrolles 1918

In 1918, Ribeyrolles, Sutter and Chauchat designed the Chauchat-Ribeyrolles 1918 submachine gun. This weapon was meant to be used for close-range protection for the French tank crews. The weapon is based on the RSC Mle. 1917 semi-automatic rifle mechanism. The first trials used a Mannlicher–Berthier clip holding eight cartridges. The trials continued until 1919 with a weapon using the same magazine as the Chauchat. The results were satisfactory but the weapon was too powerful for the intended self-protection use. A mix of standard and tracer bullets was planned to be used to assist in aiming.

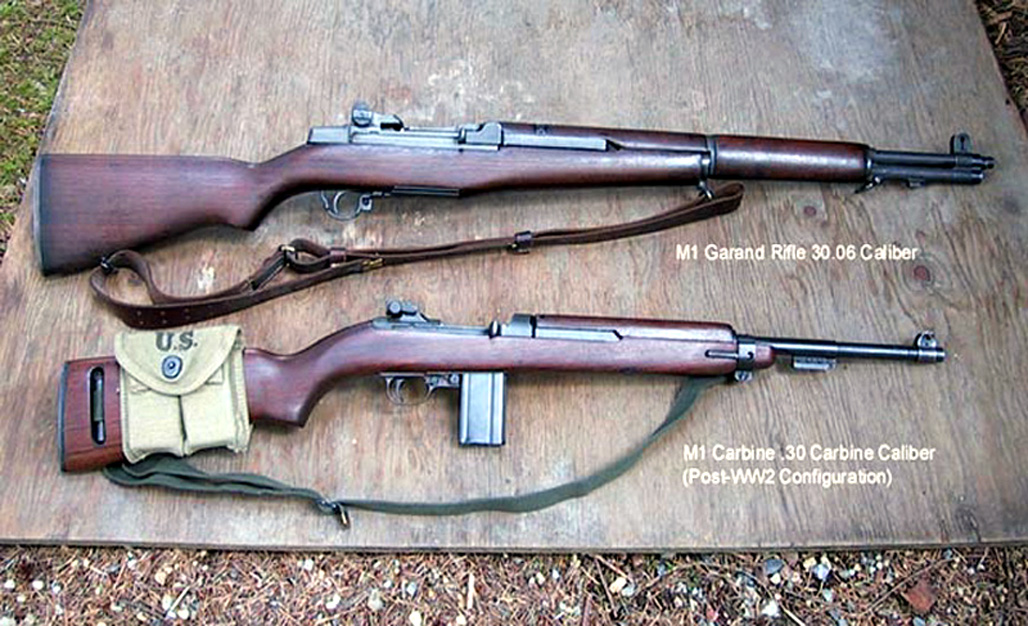
M1 Garand and M1 Carbine

In 1938, the U.S. Army Ordnance Department received a request for a light rifle to be issued to mortarmen, radiomen, drivers, clerks, cooks, and similar grades. During field exercises, these troops found that the M1 Garand rifle was too heavy and too cumbersome for general issue. And, while handguns are undeniably convenient, they had limited range, accuracy and power. This request was refused by authorities.

In 1940, after Germany's use of glider-borne and paratroop forces to infiltrate and attack strategic points behind the front lines, the request for a light rifle was resubmitted and subsequently approved. U.S. Army Ordnance issued a requirement for a "light rifle" with greater range, firepower, and accuracy than the M1911 pistol while weighing half as much as the M1 Garand. As a result, the U.S. developed the semi-automatic M1 Carbine and shortly thereafter the select-fire M2 Carbine.

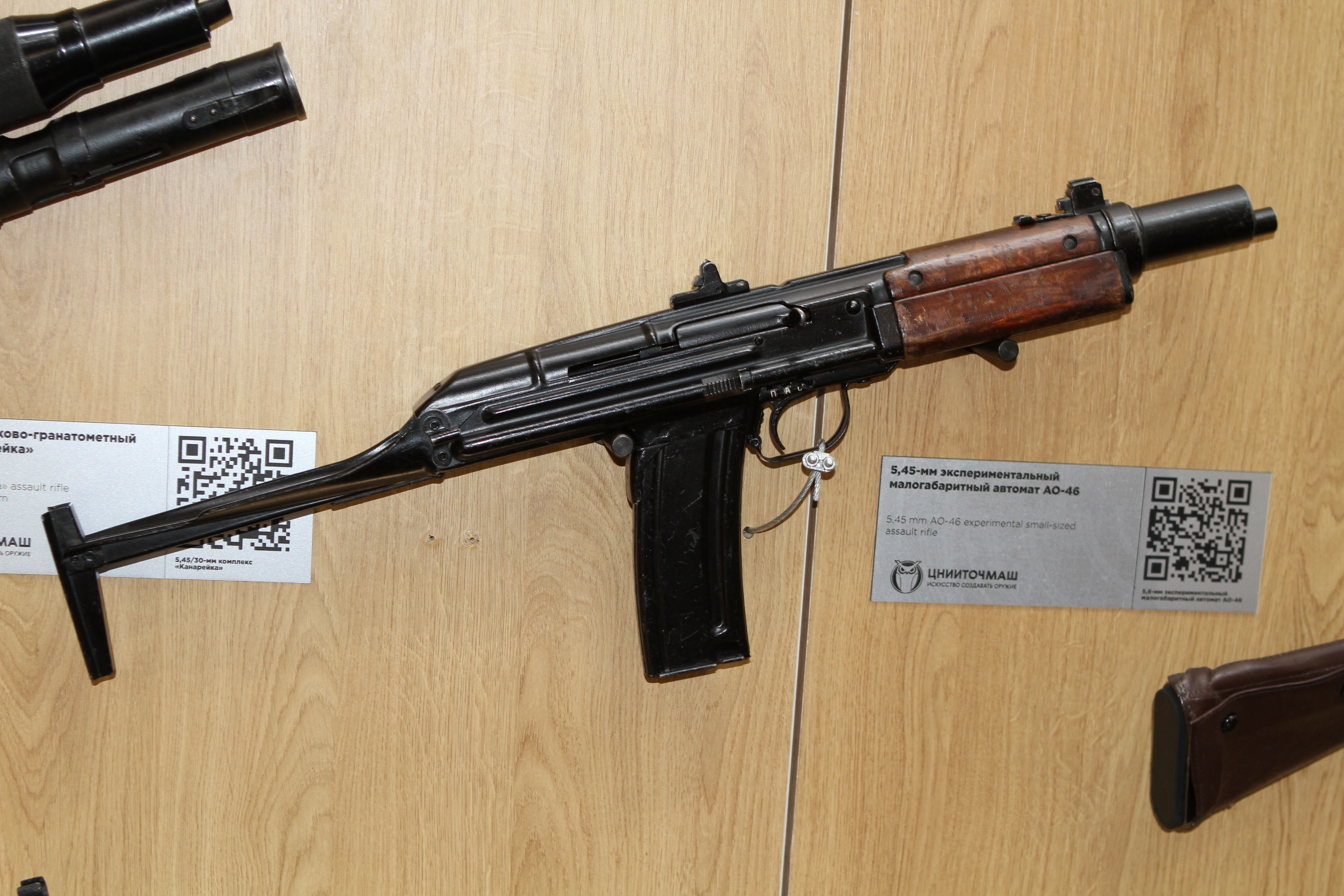
AO-46

In 1969, AO-46 was an unsolicited design by Peter Andreevich Tkachev working at TsNIITochMash. Although not accepted for service, this design, in combination with report of the US use of the XM-177 in Vietnam led the GRAU to start the competition known as Project Modern, which led to the adoption of AKS-74U for service.

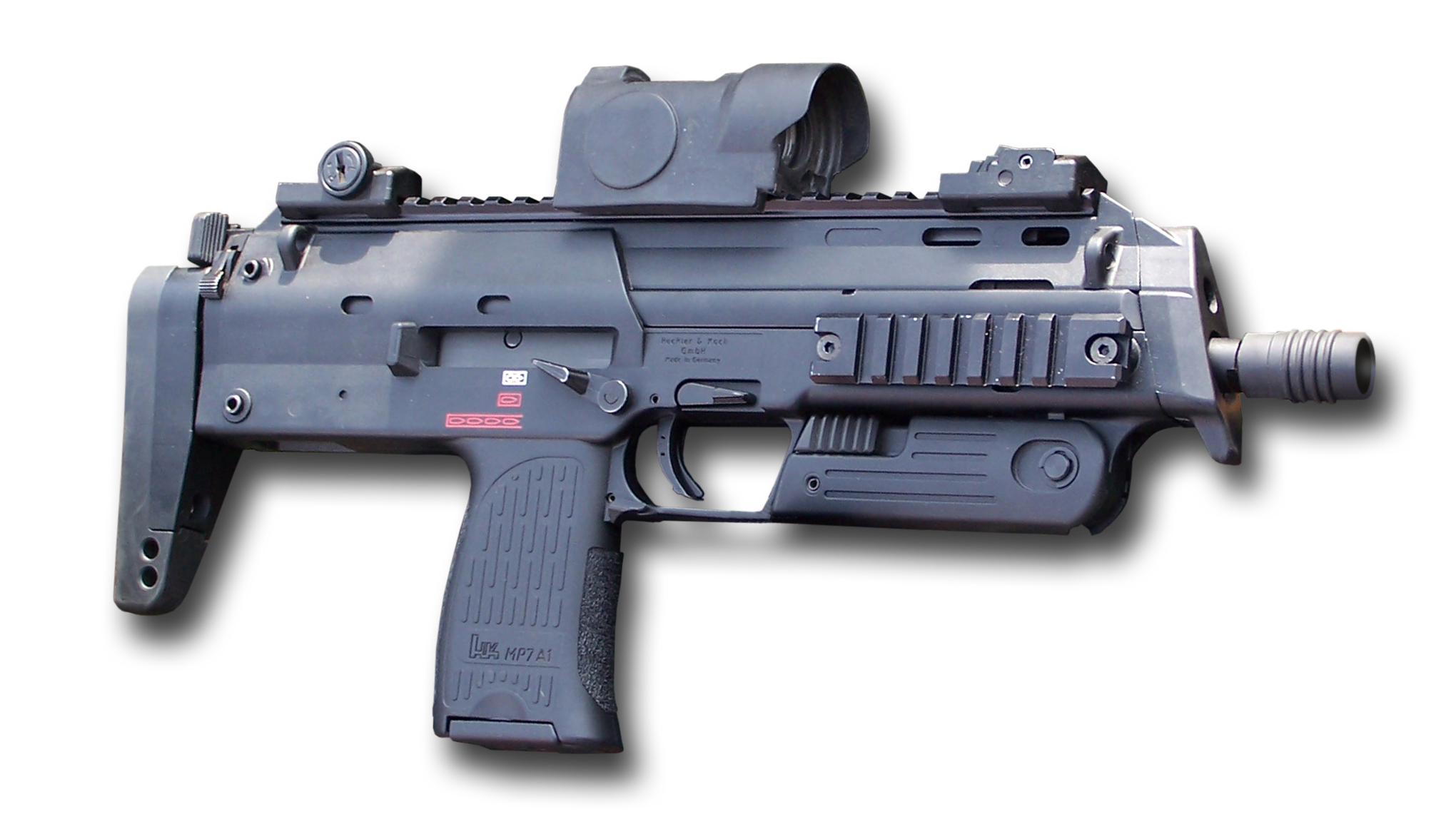
Heckler & Koch MP7A1

Introduced in 1991, the FN P90 features a bullpup design with a futuristic appearance. It has a 50-round magazine housed horizontally above the barrel, an integrated reflex sight and fully ambidextrous controls. A simple blow-back automatic weapon, it was designed to fire the FN 5.7×28mm cartridge which can penetrate soft body armor. The P90 was designed to have a length no greater than a man's shoulder width, to allow it to be easily carried and maneuvered in tight spaces, such as the inside of an armored vehicle.

Introduced in 2001, the Heckler & Koch MP7 is a direct rival to the FN P90. Featuring a more conventional-looking design, the MP7 uses a short-stroke piston gas system as used on H&K's G36 and HK416 assault rifles, in place of a blowback system traditionally seen on submachine guns. The MP7 is able to use 20-, 30- and 40-round magazines and fires 4.6×30mm ammunition which can penetrate soft body armor. Due to the heavy use of polymers in its construction, the MP7 is much lighter than older SMG designs, weighing only 1.9 kg (4.19 lb) with an empty 20-round magazine.

== Applications ==
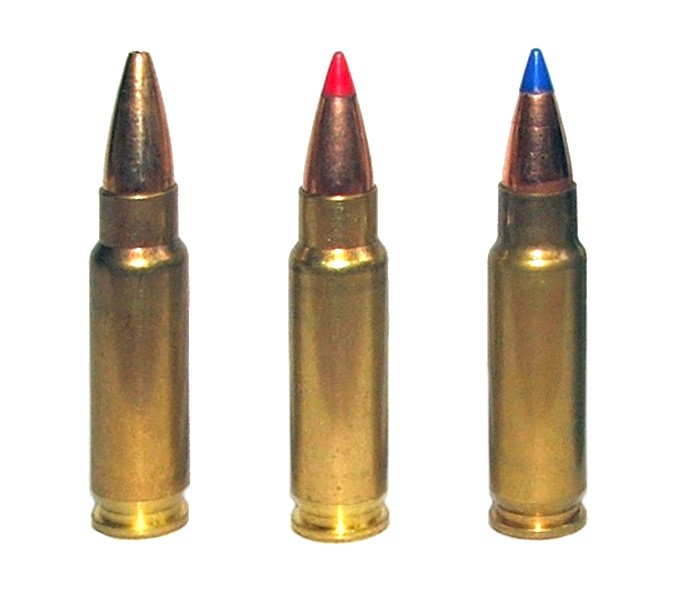
Three civilian 5.7×28mm cartridges as used in the P90. The left cartridge has a plain hollow tip, the center cartridge has a red plastic V-max tip intended to ensure bullet expansion, and the right cartridge has a blue plastic V-max tip.

The PDW concept has not been widely successful, partly because existing PDWs are not significantly cheaper to manufacture than carbines or full-size military rifles. Most PDWs also use a proprietary cartridge, such as the 5.7×28mm cartridge for the FN P90 or the 4.6×30mm for the H&K MP7, neither of which were originally compatible with any existing pistols or rifles/carbines. Although both manufacturers planned handguns that used the same proprietary rounds, only FN went forward with production of the Five-SeveN pistol, which was the only handgun option available for the 5.7×28mm cartridge for over two decades until the introduction of Ruger-5.7 in 2019. In turn, this made the PDW cartridges expensive to consumers due to the lack of mass production.

Though personal defense weapons have not been very popular for their intended application, they have been acquired by various military special forces units and law enforcement groups, as an upgrade for their older submachine guns. The FN P90 and Five-seven pistol are used by military and police forces in over 40 countries, including Canada, Cyprus, France, Greece, India, Peru, Poland, Spain, and the United States. The Heckler & Koch MP7 is also used in a number of countries, including Austria, France, Germany, Ireland, Norway, Malaysia, and the United Kingdom.

== PDW cartridges ==
- 4.38×30mm Libra
- HK 4.6×30mm
- .224 Boz
- FN 5.7×28mm
- 5.8×21mm DAP
- 6.5×25mm CBJ
- 7.92×24mm
- 9×21mm Gyurza

== Traditional personal defense weapons ==
Name	Cartridge	Country	Serial production
Brügger & Thomet APC9 RWS ACTION SE Gen. II SXF variant	9×19mm, regular loads and armor piercing RWS ACTION SE Gen. II SXF loads	Switzerland	
Brügger & Thomet MP9	6.5×25mm CBJ, 9×19mm	Switzerland	yes
Colt SCAMP	.22 SCAMP	United States	no
ČZW-438	4.38×30mm Libra	Czech Republic	no
FN P90	5.7×28mm	Belgium	yes
Heckler & Koch MP7	4.6×30mm	Germany	yes
Saab Bofors Dynamics CBJ-MS	6.5×25mm CBJ	Sweden	no
SR-2 Veresk	9×21mm Gyurza	Russia	yes
ST Kinetics CPW	4.6×30mm, 5.7×28mm, 9×19mm	Singapore	yes
Tuma MTE 224 VA	.224 Voboril	Switzerland	no
VBR-Belgium PDW	7.92×24mm	Belgium	

== Other ==
Name	Cartridge	Country	Serial production	Note
AAC Honey Badger	.300 AAC Blackout (7.62×35mm)	United States	yes	
AKS-74U	5.45×39mm	Soviet Union	yes	
AO-46	5.45×39mm	Soviet Union	no	
AR-57	5.7×28mm	United States	yes	M16 lower receiver with a redesigned upper receiver fed by FN P90 magazines
Barrett REC7 PDW	6.8mm Remington SPC (6.8×43mm)	United States		
Floro PDW	5.56×45mm	Philippines		
FN SCAR PDW	5.56×45mm	Belgium	yes	
GA Personal Defense Weapon	7.62×37mm Musang	Philippines		
GAU-5A Aircrew Self Defense Weapon	5.56×45mm	United States	yes	Takedown gun
Globserver PDW	9×19mm Parabellum	Hungary	yes	
Heckler & Koch MP5K-PDW	9×19mm Parabellum	Germany	yes	
Knight's Armament Company PDW	6×35mm KAC,.300 Blackout	United States	yes	
Magpul PDR	5.56×45mm	United States	no	
SAI SMG Tiger Cub	9×19mm Parabellum	Denmark	yes	
SIG MCX Rattler	5.56×45mm, .300 Blackout	United States	yes	

== See also ==
- Assault rifle
- Assault weapon
- Machine pistol
