= Magpul PDR =

Prototype bullpup PDW

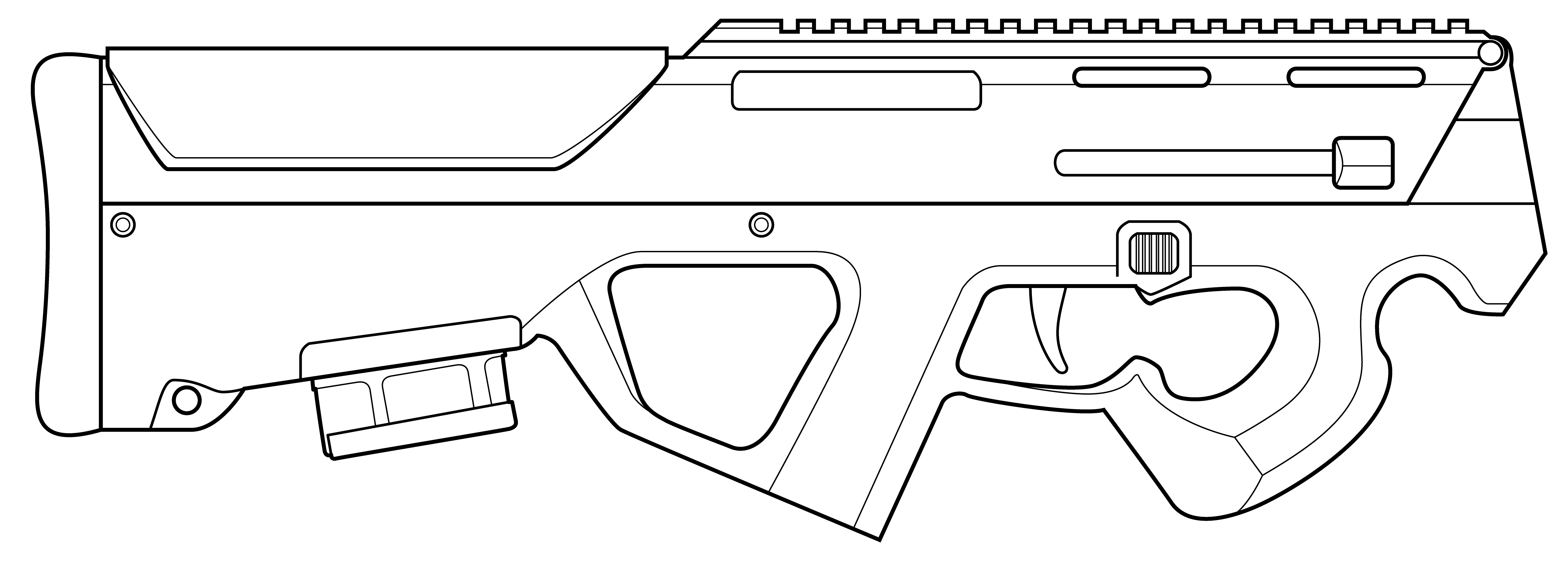
- PDR line drawing and profile
- Type: Bullpup personal defense weapon Assault Rifle; Carbine
- Place of origin: United States

Production history
- Designer: Magpul Industries
- Designed: 2006–2011
- Produced: Never went into production
- Variants: PDR-D

Specifications
- Length: PDR-D: 19 in (480 mm)
- Barrel length: 10.5 to 12.5 inches
- Cartridge: 5.56×45mm NATO
- Caliber: 5.56mm
- Action: Gas-operated, rotating bolt
- Rate of fire: 550-650 rounds/min
- Feed system: Various STANAG magazines
- Sights: Iron sights, MIL-STD-1913 rail provided for optics

The Magpul PDR (lit. 'Personal Defense Rifle') is a prototype bullpup-style 5.56×45mm NATO carbine unveiled by Magpul Industries in 2006.

== History ==
The PDR consists of a gas-operated bullpup carbine intended to replace some submachine guns, M9 pistols and M4 carbines while still offering the rapid fire and range of an M4 carbine in an ultra compact firearm.

== Design ==
The PDR is one of the few personal defense weapons designed to use a standard caliber to simplify the logistics. The method of operation is a short stroke gas piston.

The PDR is striker-fired, features an ambidextrous ejection system, and ambidextrous controls. Although development of the PDR was halted in 2011, it has since garnered some attention, largely due to its "futuristic" appearance.

== Variants ==
=== PDR-C ===
Standing for "Compact", the PDR-C features an FN P90-style pistol grip and ergonomics offering a more compact weapon.

=== PDR-D ===
Standing for "Direct", the PDR-D uses a more conventional pistol grip with vertical grip (similar to a Steyr TMP) and safety nub to keep users from injuring themselves.

== See also ==
- Magpul FMG-9
