= 306 (disambiguation) =

306 may refer to:

- 306 (number)
- 306 AD, a year
- 306 BC, a year
- Area code 306, area code for Saskatchewan

== Media ==
=== Art ===
- 306 Group, a New York City group of African-American artists

=== Film ===
- 306 Hollywood

=== Literacy ===
- Lectionary 306, a Greek manuscript
- Minuscule 306, a Greek manuscript

== Military ==
=== Military units ===
==== Germany ====
- Bau-Bataillon 306
- Police Battalion 306

==== Poland ====
- No. 306 Polish Fighter Squadron

==== United States ====
- VFP-306

=== Military vehicles ===
- USNS Benavidez (T-AKR 306), a Bob Hope-class vehicle cargo ship
- USS Bernalillo County (LST-306), an LST-1-class tank landing ship
- USS Specter (AM-306), an Admirable-class minesweeper
- USS Tang (SS-306), a Balao-class submarine

== Science and technology ==
=== Astronomy ===
- 306 Unitas, an asteroid
- NGC 306, an open cluster in Tucana

=== Technology ===
- HTTP 306

== Transportation ==
=== Airplanes ===
- Boeing Model 306, a cancelled airplane

=== Automobiles ===
- Peugeot 306, a French compact car lineup
- Weiwang 306, a Chinese microvan

=== Boats ===
- Hunter 306, an American sailboat

=== Buses ===
- Fiat 306, an Italian bus

=== Roads and routes ===
- List of highways numbered 306
- Swissair Flight 306, a planned flight from Zürich to Rome

=== Trains ===
- British Rail Class 306
