= Construction battalion =

A construction battalion is an armed forces battalion that is formally designated to engage in construction. Often they build structures for military use. A construction battalion may refer to:

- 371st Engineer Construction Battalion, US Army
- Bau-Bataillon (Nazi Germany), German term for "construction battalion"
  - Bau-Bataillon 87
  - Bau-Bataillon 121
  - Bau-Bataillon 306
  - Luftwaffe construction units
  - Litauische Bau-Bataillonen
  - Ost-Bau-Pionier-Bataillon 559
- Construction battalion (Soviet Union), a detachment within construction troops of the Soviet Union, Russia, or Belarus
- No. 2 Construction Battalion, Canadian Expeditionary Force
- United States Naval Construction Battalions, or Seabee

== See also ==
- Labour battalion
- Pioneer (military)
- Construction troops
  - Organisation Todt
  - Construction soldier, German Democratic Republic
  - United States Army Corps of Engineers
- Military-Construction Complex of the Ministry of Defence of Russia
