= Whisper (cartridge family) =

Family of firearm cartridges

- Type: Military; Police; Competition; Specialized hunting

Production history
- Designer: J.D. Jones
- Designed: 1990s
- Manufacturer: SSK Industries

The Whisper family of firearm cartridges is a group of wildcat cartridges developed in the early 1990s by J.D. Jones at SSK Industries. The Whisper family was developed as a line of accurate, multi-purpose cartridges using relatively heavy rifle bullets for a given caliber in subsonic loads. The intention was to create an extremely accurate cartridge family for military, police, competition and specialized hunting markets that could also be easily sound suppressed.

While all cartridges in the Whisper family must be capable of accuracy using subsonic loads, most of the smaller caliber cartridges of the family (.308" and under) are also capable of being loaded to supersonic velocities using relatively lightweight bullets for their caliber, increasing their utility.

== Subsonic cartridges ==
A subsonic cartridge is designed to fire its bullets at velocities slower than the speed of sound (1128 ft/s at 70 °F) to avoid the sonic crack caused by the bullet breaking the sound barrier. This allows the cartridge to be sound suppressed relatively easily. Additionally, in some cases, subsonic loads are often intended to avoid the turbulent transonic zone entirely, maximizing potential accuracy.

== Whisper cartridge cases ==
The Whisper Family
Cartridge	Metric	Parent Case
6mm Whisper	6×35mm	.221 Fireball
.257 Whisper	6.4×35mm	.221 Fireball
6.5mm Whisper	6.5×35mm	.221 Fireball
7mm Whisper	7×35mm	.221 Fireball
.300 Whisper	7.62×35mm	.221 Fireball
.300 Whisper Rimmed	7.62×36mm R	.357 Remington Maximum
.302 Whisper	7.62×38mm	7mm BR
.338 Whisper #1	8.6×38mm	7mm BR
.338 Whisper #2	8.6×35mm	.221 Fireball
.375 Whisper	9.5×37mm	7mm BR
.416 Whisper	10.4×37mm	7mm BR
.45-70 Whisper	11.6×41mm R	.45-70 Government
.458 Whisper Belted	11.6×44mm B	.458 Winchester Magnum
.500 Whisper Short Belted	12.7×57mm B	.460 Weatherby Magnum
.50-70 Whisper	12.7×45mm R	.50-70 Government
.510 Whisper	12.7×47mm	.338 Lapua Mag

Another consideration of the Whisper family design is that all of the cartridges are based on existing cases that utilize common case head dimensions. This allows rifles with common bolt face dimensions to be converted to a Whisper cartridge fairly easily, often requiring only the rifle's action to be re-barreled. There are two main "series" within the Whisper family, each using a different parent case suited to simple easy conversion.

- The .221 Fireball case shares the same case head dimensions (0.375"/ 9.53mm) as the commercial .223 Remington and military 5.56×45mm cartridges. With .300 Whisper, reloaders have also found success in trimming the more common .223 Rem brass to length for an alternative parent case, but JD Jones has advised against this practice. Among other issues, the neck wall may be too thick.
- The 7mm Remington Bench Rest case shares the same case head dimensions (0.470"/ 11.94mm) as the commercial .308 Winchester (as well as other cartridges based on that case; .243 Winchester, .260 Remington, 7mm-08 Remington, etc.) and military 7.62×51 NATO cartridges.

The other cartridges generally each use a different parent case in a "one-off" fashion:

- The .338 Lapua Magnum case also has a fairly unusual case head diameter (0.590"/ 14.99mm). However, the vast majority of rifles chambered for the .338 Lapua Magnum are bolt actions and as such can be chambered in .510 Whisper via a relatively simple re-barrelling. As the manufacture of .338 Lapua Magnum ammunition would appear to be going nowhere but up (due to several militaries adopting it for their sniper rifles), this may be a reason behind the development of a Whisper cartridge based on its case—more available and more economical brass. The .338 Lapua Magnum case by itself has been based on the .416 Rigby.
- The .460 Weatherby Magnum has a case head diameter (0.580"/ 14,73mm) unique to the large Weatherby belted magnum cases. Few other cartridges use this case head size (or something close, like the .416 Rigby). This tends to mean that rifles capable of being converted are somewhat less available or are based on expensive custom actions. Also, cases for forming tend to be very expensive. The .460 Weatherby Magnum case by itself has been based on the .378 Weatherby Magnum.

=== Mini and Micro Whispers ===
There are also two little-known cartridges of the Whisper Family based on handgun cartridge cases mated to a rifle bullet. The case dimension is unchanged, but chambering is changed to accept a longer bullet. These are:

- The Micro Whisper, based on the .30 Luger case, with overall length 40.34 mm (1.588 in); and
- The Mini-Whisper, based on the .30 Mauser case, with overall length 44.98 mm (1.771 in).

Like the rest of the Whisper family, these two cartridges are designed to fire rifle bullets at subsonic velocities.

== Trademark ==
SSK Industries has a registration for the wordmark "Whisper" (reg. no. 1898840) in class 13 (ammunition). In order to sidestep this branding and/or avoid licensing fees required to use the "Whisper" name legally, other manufacturers tend to use different names for cartridges in the Whisper family. For example, the .300 Whisper, the most popular cartridge of the family, is often called .300 AAC Blackout, ".300 AAC", ".300 Fireball", ".300 warrior carbine", or ".300-221".

== Standardization ==
The only cartridge in the Whisper family to have been standardized is the .300 Whisper. It was standardized by the C.I.P. in 2009, then dropped some time between 2018 and 2025. The SAAMI standardized the derived .300 AAC Blackout in 2011, followed by the C.I.P. in 2015. The C.I.P. currently lists ".300 Whisper" as an alternative name for ".300 AAC Blackout".

== See also ==
- .300 AAC Blackout
- 8.6 Blackout
- 12.7×55mm STs-130
