= .510 Whisper =

Rifle cartridge

- Type: Rifle
- Place of origin: USA

Production history
- Designer: SSK Industries

Specifications
- Parent case: .338 Lapua Magnum
- Case type: Rimless, bottleneck
- Bullet diameter: .510 in (13.0 mm)
- Neck diameter: .549 in (13.9 mm)
- Shoulder diameter: .587 in (14.9 mm)
- Base diameter: .587 in (14.9 mm)
- Rim diameter: .588 in (14.9 mm)
- Case length: 1.865 in (47.4 mm)
- Overall length: 3.34 in (85 mm)

Ballistic performance
Bullet mass/type	Velocity	Energy
750 gr (49 g) AMax	1,050 ft/s (320 m/s)	1,837 ft⋅lbf (2,491 J)
- Source(s): SSK Industries, Ammo.org

The .510 Whisper (13×47mm) is a subsonic rifle cartridge developed by SSK Industries for use in suppressed rifles. It is capable of firing a .51 caliber bullet weighing 750 gr (49 g) at roughly 1,050 ft/s (320 m/s).

== Overview ==
The .510 Whisper (13×47mm) is the second of two .50 in (13 mm) rounds developed by J. D. Jones with a specific focus on the Thumper concept and subsonic use. Based on the .416 Rigby case, it is a non-belted and bottlenecked cartridge.

Earlier J. D. Jones had already developed the similar .500 Whisper round, which has a roughly .4 in (10 mm) longer belted bottlenecked case based on the .378 Weatherby Magnum.

Despite the large bullet, this round is very quiet when using a suppressor due to the subsonic nature of the cartridge. When used with a very high ballistic coefficient bullet, the round only loses about 100 ft/s (30 m/s) out to over 500 yd (460 m). This gives it more downrange energy at that distance than traditional .30 caliber rounds such as the .308 Winchester and .300 Winchester Magnum. Sako TRG-S test rifles have achieved minute of angle, and better, accuracy with this cartridge at 600 yd (550 m).

Powders such as H110, 4227, or surplus WC820 are well suited for subsonic loads and give a low standard deviation. Necessary components such as barrels, reloading dies, etc. are available from SSK. Sako TRG-S actions are most often converted to this caliber. The Thompson Center Encore is also suitable, but is rather lightweight for shooting this heavy recoiling cartridge, especially when using 950 gr (62 g) bullets.

== Design ==
The case of the .510 Whisper is based on the .416 Rigby (same as the .338 Lapua Magnum) as the parent case. Overall length of the loaded round is about 3.34 in (85 mm).

== See also ==
- Whisper Family of Firearm Cartridges
- 12.7×55mm STs-130
- 12 mm caliber
- Glossary of firearms terminology
- List of rifle cartridges
