= 3006 =

3006 or variant, may refer to:

== In general ==
- A.D. 3006, a year in the 4th millennium CE
- 3006 BC, a year in the 4th millennium BCE
- 3006, a number in the 3000 (number) range

== Roads numbered 3006 ==
- Louisiana Highway 3006
- Pennsylvania Route 3006
- Texas Farm to Market Road 3006
- A3006 road (Great Britain)

== Ships with pennant 3006 ==
- German submarine U-3006, a World War II German U-boat
- USS America (ID-3006), a World War I U.S. Navy troopship
- USNS PFC Eugene A. Obregon (T-AK-3006), a U.S. Navy cargo ship
- RFA Largs Bay (L3006), a British Royal Navy landing ship

== Weaponry ==
- §30.06 in Texas gun laws
- .30-06 Springfield (7.62×63mm) or .30 Gov't '06 Winchester; a standard U.S. Army gun cartridge
  - .30-06 Springfield wildcat cartridges
  - .30-06 JDJ

== Other uses ==
- 3006 Livadia, an asteroid in the Asteroid Belt, the 3006th asteroid registered
- ".30-06", a song by Hardy from the album The Mockingbird & the Crow

== See also ==
- 306 (disambiguation)
