= .338 Whisper =

US wildcat cartridge from the 1990s

- Type: Rifle, subsonic
- Place of origin: USA

Production history
- Designer: J.D. Jones
- Designed: 1990s
- Manufacturer: SSK Industries

Specifications
- Parent case: 7mm BR Remington
- Case type: Rimless, bottleneck
- Bullet diameter: 8.59 mm (0.338 in)
- Neck diameter: 9.11 mm (0.359 in)
- Shoulder diameter: 11.60 mm (0.457 in)
- Base diameter: 11.83 mm (0.466 in)
- Rim diameter: 11.91 mm (0.469 in)
- Rim thickness: 1.20 mm (0.047 in)
- Case length: 38.08 mm (1.499 in)
- Overall length: 67.51 mm (2.658 in)

Ballistic performance
Bullet mass/type	Velocity	Energy
200 gr (13 g) BT	1,077 ft/s (328 m/s)	515 ft⋅lbf (698 J)
250 gr (16 g) BT	1,040 ft/s (320 m/s)	600 ft⋅lbf (810 J)
300 gr (19 g) BT	1,050 ft/s (320 m/s)	735 ft⋅lbf (997 J)
- Test barrel length: 12"; Source(s): Cartridges of the World

.338 Whisper
- Type: Rifle, subsonic
- Place of origin: USA

Production history
- Designer: J.D. Jones
- Designed: 1990s
- Manufacturer: SSK Industries

Specifications
- Parent case: .221 Remington Fireball
- Case type: Rimless, straight
- Bullet diameter: 8.59 mm (0.338 in)
- Base diameter: 9.6 mm (0.38 in)
- Rim diameter: 9.6 mm (0.38 in)

The .338 Whisper (8.59x38mm) is a wildcat cartridge in the Whisper family, a group of cartridges developed in the early 1990s by J.D. Jones of SSK Industries. Unlike the smaller caliber cartridges in the Whisper family, loads for the .338 Whisper are mainly limited to subsonic velocities.

== Versions ==
There are two versions of the .338 Whisper:

1. The original .338 Whisper #1 (metric: 8.6x38mm) is based on the 7mm BR Remington case, necked up (enlarged) to take a .338" bullet. As the 7mm Bench Rest and .308 Winchester cases share the same case head dimensions, conversion to .338 Whisper from a rifle previously chambered in .308 Winchester (or any cartridge based on the .308 Winchester case, such as .243 Winchester, .260 Remington, 7 mm-08 Remington, etc...) is a relatively simple task.
2. The second version (called .338 Whisper #2 by SSK, metric: 8.6x35mm) is based on the .221 Remington Fireball case, simplifying conversion of firearms chambered in 5.56×45mm or its commercial counterpart, .223 Remington.

== Subsonic ==
A subsonic cartridge is designed to fire its bullets at velocities slower than the speed of sound (1128 ft/s at 70 °F) to avoid the sonic crack caused by the bullet breaking the sound barrier, which contributes in large part to the overall noise produced when using a firearm. Subsonic loads are often designed to avoid the turbulent transonic zone (~900ft/s - 1350ft/s or 0.8 to 1.2 mach) entirely. This allows the firearm to be suppressed relatively easily. To ensure terminal performance at subsonic velocities, heavy bullets for the caliber (250–300 grains (16–19 g)) are desirable. Of course the silent, subsonic loads should be loaded below the speed of sound with preferably the heaviest and longest bullet the .338 calibre has to offer. Currently this is the 300-grain (19 g) Berger Hybrid Open Tip Match (OTM) with a BC of 0.818 and a length of 1.820 inches (46.2 mm).

== Supersonic ==
Only those .338 based on the 7mmBR case offer meaningful supersonic velocities. A full power load with fast powder can push a 165-grain (10.7 g) Barnes bullet to a muzzle velocity of 2,520 ft/s (770 m/s). Another favourite pick for such an exercise would be the 180-grain (12 g) Nosler Accubond or the 200-grain (13 g) Nosler Ballistic tip traveling at 2,200–2,350 ft/s (670–720 m/s). Often found to be too explosive in high power rifles, at such moderate speeds the Ballistic Tips provide both expansion and penetration - this combination with excellent accuracy and a high ballistic coefficient.

== Trademark ==
"Whisper" is a registered trademark of SSK Industries. In order to sidestep this branding (and/or any licensing fees required to use the "Whisper" name legally), other manufacturers tend to use different names for cartridges in the Whisper family. For example, .338 Murmur, .338 Phantom and .338 Benchrest. The .300 Whisper (the most popular cartridge of the family) is often called ".300 Fireball" or ".300-221".

== See also ==
- List of rifle cartridges
- 8 mm caliber
