= Subsonic ammunition =

Quieter bullets slower than the speed of sound

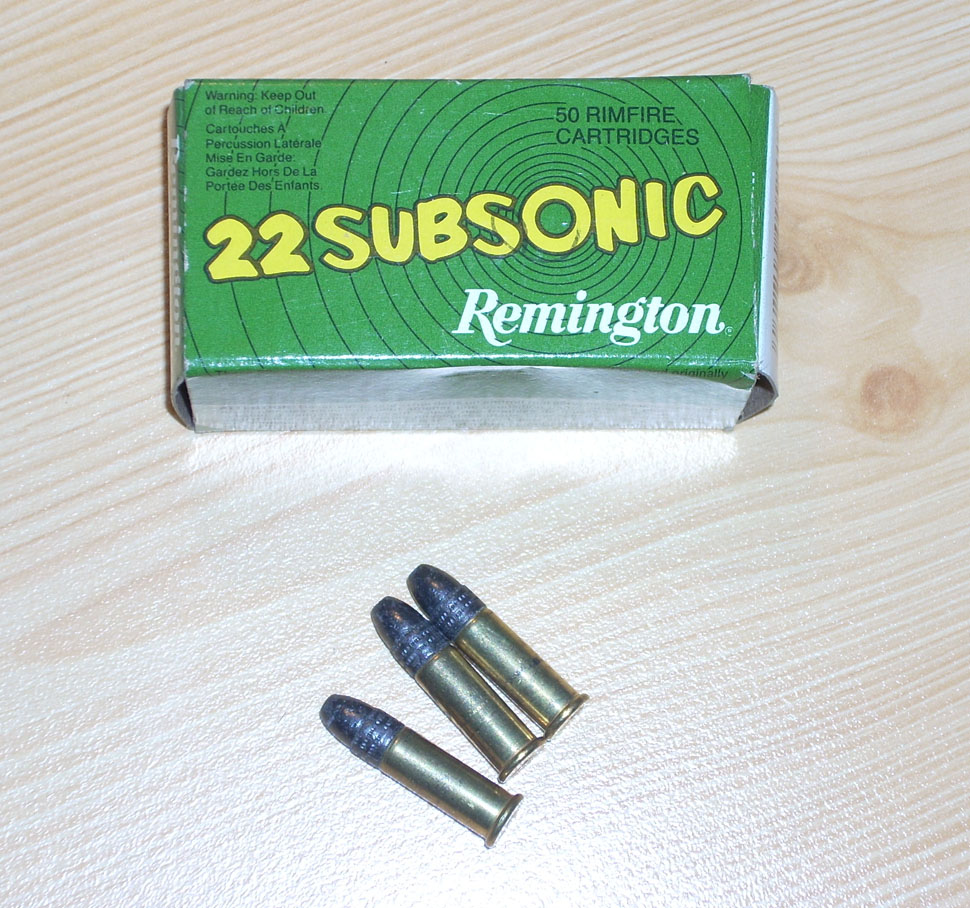
.22 Long Rifle Remington Subsonic hollowpoint ammunition

Subsonic ammunition is ammunition designed to operate at velocities below the speed of sound (Mach 1), which at standard conditions is 340.29 m/s (1,116.4 ft/s). This avoids the supersonic shockwave or "crack" of a supersonic bullet, which, particularly for suppressed firearms, influences the loudness of the shot.

Subsonic ammunition usually uses heavier bullets to retain as much kinetic energy as possible at the lower velocities. Some subsonic ammunition is used in non-suppressed firearms to gain the advantages of heavier bullet weights.

== Standard calibers ==
=== Subsonic versions of standard rounds ===
In this instance, heavier bullets are loaded in standard ammunition, which reduces muzzle velocity below the speed of sound.

As an example, the very common 9×19mm Parabellum standard military round is a 7.5 g (116 gr) bullet at velocities typically around 360 m/s (1,200 ft/s). Subsonic loads for 9×19mm Parabellum commonly use 9.5 g (147 gr) bullets at velocities of 300 m/s (980 ft/s).

For these ammunition loads, balancing bullet weight and velocity are required to ensure that the ammunition will still reliably cycle semi-automatic firearms. Subsonic ammunition with normal bullet weights often fails to function properly in such firearms.

=== Inherently subsonic calibers ===
Some ammunition types were inherently designed with heavier, slower standard bullet weights and velocities. For example, the traditional American military standard .45 ACP ammunition load of a 14.9 g (230 gr) bullet at 259 m/s (850 ft/s), is naturally subsonic.

== Specialized subsonic calibers ==
Alternatively, specialized firearms and ammunition may be used to optimize total subsonic ammunition effectiveness. These are designed from the start as dedicated subsonic projectile systems. Some examples include .300 Whisper, 300 AAC Blackout, .338 Whisper, 8.6mm Blackout, 9×39mm, 12.7×55mm STs-130, .500 Whisper, and .510 Whisper.

== Use with suppressors ==
Combined with firearm sound suppressors, subsonic ammunition may significantly reduce sound levels compared to normal ammunition. Specific reductions depend on the ammunition and suppressor.

The peak sound pressure levels of a Remington 700 .223 caliber bolt-action rifle firing high-velocity (supersonic) ammunition using a GEMTECH G5-5.56 suppressor.

| Suppressor Condition | Muzzle (dB SPL) | Left Ear (dB SPL) | Right Ear (dB SPL) | Behind Shooter (dB SPL) |
|---|---|---|---|---|
| Unsuppressed | 176 | 160 | 160 | 148 |
| Suppressed | 148 | 134 | 136 | 120 |
| Reduction | 28 | 26 | 24 | 28 |

The peak sound pressure levels of a Remington 700 .223 caliber bolt-action rifle firing low-velocity (subsonic) ammunition using a GEMTECH G5-5.56 suppressor.

| Suppressor Condition | Muzzle (dB SPL) | Left Ear (dB SPL) | Right Ear (dB SPL) | Behind Shooter (dB SPL) |
|---|---|---|---|---|
| Unsuppressed | 157 | 140 | 140 | 127 |
| Suppressed | 131 | 122 | 120 | 100 |
| Reduction | 26 | 18 | 20 | 27 |

Compared to the high-velocity (supersonic) unsuppressed condition, the combination of subsonic low-velocity ammunition and a firearm suppressor provided reductions of 45, 38, 40, and 48 dB, peak sound pressure level at the muzzle, left, right ears and behind the shooter, respectively.
