= .500 =

.500 may refer to:

- .500 S&W Magnum, a revolver cartridge
- .500 S&W Special, a revolver cartridge
- .500 Wyoming Express, a revolver cartridge
- .500 Linebaugh, a revolver cartridge
- .500 Maximum, a revolver cartridge
- .500 Bushwhacker, a revolver cartridge
- .500 Nitro Express, a big-game rifle cartridge
- .500 Jeffery, a big-game rifle cartridge
- .500 Whisper, a subsonic rifle cartridge
- .500 Black Powder Express, a black powder rifle cartridge
- .500, an even winning percentage in sports, where a team or player has won the same number of games as they have lost
