= .500 Whisper =

Type of rifle cartridge

- Type: Rifle
- Place of origin: USA

Production history
- Designer: SSK Industries

Specifications
- Parent case: .378 Weatherby Magnum
- Case type: belted, bottlenecked
- Bullet diameter: .510 in (13.0 mm)
- Neck diameter: .549 in (13.9 mm)
- Base diameter: .582 in (14.8 mm)
- Rim diameter: .579 in (14.7 mm)
- Rim thickness: .063 in (1.6 mm)

Ballistic performance
Bullet mass/type	Velocity	Energy
750 gr (49 g) AMax	1,050 ft/s (320 m/s)	1,837 ft⋅lbf (2,491 J)
- Source(s): SSK Industries, Ammo.org

The .500 Whisper or .500 Whisper Short Belted is a subsonic rifle cartridge developed by SSK Industries for use in suppressed rifles. It is capable of firing a .51 caliber bullet weighing 750 gr (49 g) at roughly 1,050 ft/s (320 m/s).

== Overview ==
The .500 Whisper (metric: 13×57mmB) is the first of two .50 in (13 mm) rounds developed by J. D. Jones with a specific focus on the Thumper concept and subsonic use. Being based on the .378 Weatherby Magnum case, it is a belted and bottlenecked cartridge.

Later, J. D. Jones went on to develop the similar .510 Whisper round. This has a roughly .4 in (10 mm) shorter non-belted bottlenecked case based on the .416 Rigby.

Despite the large bullet, this round is very quiet when using a suppressor due to the subsonic nature of the cartridge. When used with a very high ballistic coefficient bullet, the round only loses about 100 ft/s (30 m/s) out to over 500 yd (460 m). This gives it more downrange energy at that distance than traditional .30 caliber rounds such as the .308 Winchester and .300 Winchester Magnum. Sako TRG-S test rifles have achieved minute of angle, and better, accuracy with this cartridge at 600 yd (550 m).

Powders such as H110, 4227, or surplus WC820 are well suited for subsonic loads and give a low standard deviation. Necessary components such as barrels, reloading dies, etc. are available from SSK. Sako TRG-S actions are most often converted to this caliber. The Thompson Center Encore is also suitable, but is rather lightweight for shooting this heavy recoiling cartridge, especially when using 950 gr (62 g) bullets.

== Design ==
The case of the .500 Whisper is derived from the big-bore belted family of cases developed by Roy Weatherby in the 1950s (.378 Weatherby Magnum, .460 Weatherby Magnum). It can also be viewed as a shortened version of another .510 caliber cartridge based on the .378 Weatherby Magnum, the .500 A-Square (13x73 mm B) developed by Arthur Alphin in 1976.

The overall length of the loaded round is about 3.34 in (85 mm) which is identical to the .300 Winchester Magnum round to be able to fit magazines and actions of other common belted magnum rifles.

== See also ==
- Whisper Family of Firearm Cartridges
- 12.7×55mm STs-130
- 12 mm caliber
- Glossary of firearms terminology
- List of rifle cartridges
