= 8.6mm Blackout =

Rifle cartridge

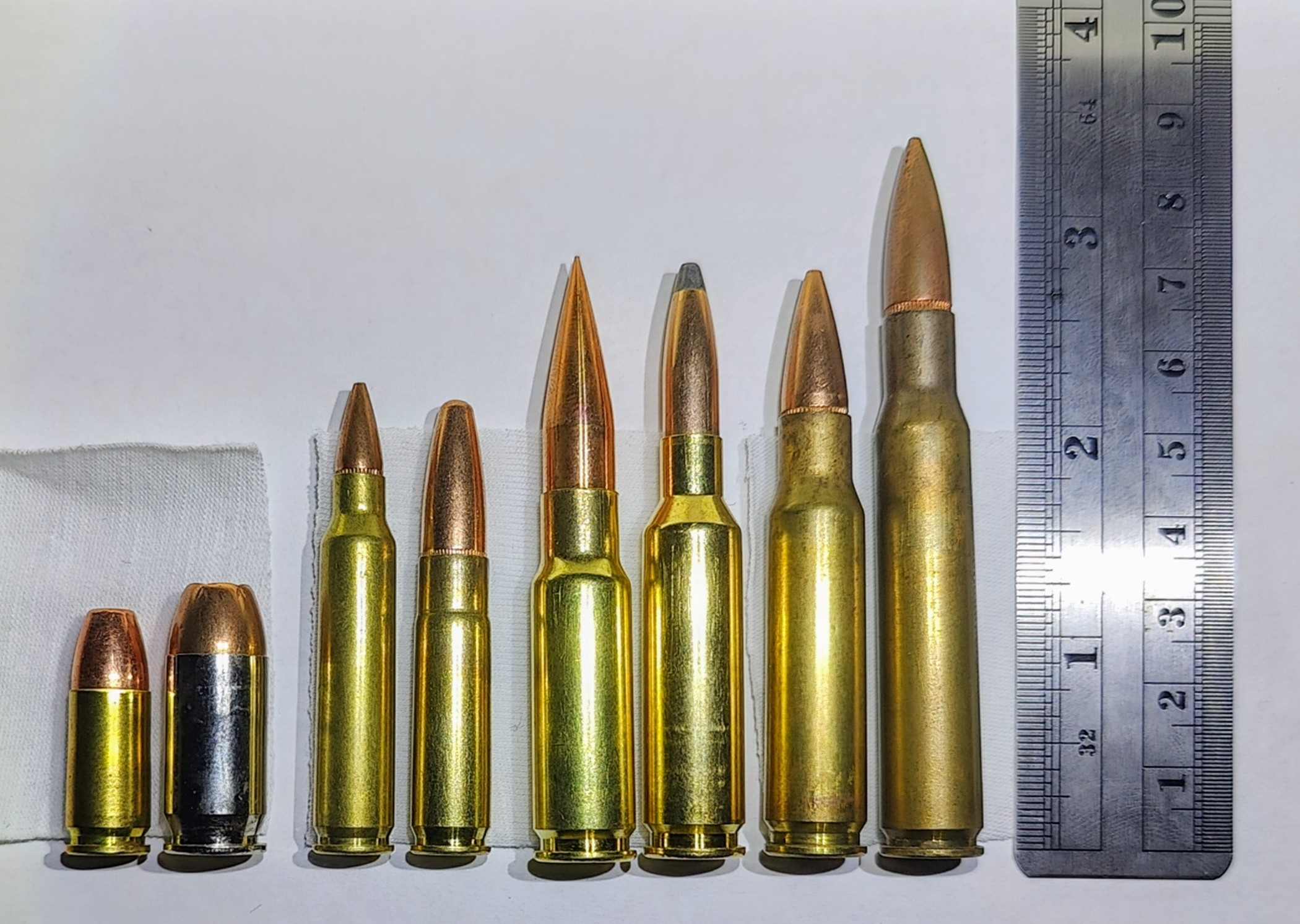
- From left to right: 9x19mm, 45 ACP, 5.56x45mm, 300 BLK, 8.6 BLK, 6.5 Creedmoor, 7.62x51mm, 30-06 Springfield
- Type: Centerfire rifle
- Place of origin: United States

Production history
- Designer: Q, LLC
- Produced: 2022–present

Specifications
- Parent case: 6.5mm Creedmoor
- Case type: Rimless, bottleneck
- Bullet diameter: 8.58 mm (0.338 in)
- Neck diameter: 9.40 mm (0.370 in)
- Shoulder diameter: 11.531 mm (0.4540 in)
- Base diameter: 11.946 mm (0.4703 in)
- Rim diameter: 12.01–0.25 mm (0.4728–0.0098 in)
- Rim thickness: 1.37–0.25 mm (0.0539–0.0098 in)
- Case length: 42.80 mm (1.685 in)
- Overall length: 63.25–71.75 mm (2.490–2.825 in)
- Rifling twist: 76–102 mm (1:3–1:4")
- Primer type: Small rifle or large rifle (depending on casing)

Ballistic performance
Bullet mass/type	Velocity	Energy
18.66 g (288 gr) Gorilla Fracturing Subsonic	320 m/s (1,000 ft/s)	955.5 J (704.7 ft⋅lbf)
13.61 g (210 gr) Gorilla Barnes TSX Supersonic	600 m/s (2,000 ft/s)	2,454 J (1,810 ft⋅lbf)
18.47 g (285 gr) Fort Scott Solid Copper TUI	321 m/s (1,050 ft/s)	945.7 J (697.5 ft⋅lbf)
22.68 g (350 gr) Steinel Solid copper Hollow Point	360 m/s (1,200 ft/s)	1,540 J (1,140 ft⋅lbf)
- Test barrel length: 406 mm (16.0 in) (12 in for Gorilla supersonic); Source

8.6mm Blackout (8.6×43 mm), sometimes referred to as 8.6 BLK, is a centerfire rifle cartridge developed by the firearms manufacturer Q, LLC. It utilizes a shortened case from the 6.5mm Creedmoor necked up to an 8.6 mm caliber (8.585 mm or 0.338 in diameter) projectile. 8.6 Blackout is designed for use in bolt-action rifles or as a caliber conversion for AR-10 style rifles.

The only required modification to convert an existing .308 Winchester-chambered rifle to 8.6mm Blackout is the replacement of the barrel. The 8.6 Blackout shares the same case head and bolt diameter as its parent cartridge, 6.5mm Creedmoor. All other components of a standard AR-10 rifle are compatible. Modifications to the operating system such as the buffer, buffer spring and gas system may be made in order to optimize functionality of the firearm. 8.6 Blackout fits in standard, unmodified .308 Winchester or 6.5 Creedmoor magazines with no effect on capacity.

The 8.6 Blackout is designed for barrels using a 76 mm or 102 mm (1:3 in or 1:4 in) twist rate and bullet weights from 10.4–14.6 g (160–225 gr) for supersonic loads and 18.5–22.7 g (285–350 gr) for subsonic loads. The "fast" twist rate 8.6mm Blackout was intended to create better expansion and more terminal energy transferred to the target through the "blender effect" of a rapidly spinning subsonic bullet.

== Platforms ==
Manufacturer	Model	Type	Country
Q	Fix	Bolt action rifle	United States
Q	Boombox	Semi-automatic rifle	United States
Chattahoochee Munitions	CM7S	Bolt action rifle and pistol	United States
Chattahoochee Munitions	CM10	Semi-automatic rifle and pistol	United States
Faxon Firearms	Sentinel	Semi-automatic rifle	United States
Gorilla Ammunition	GF-10	Semi-automatic rifle	United States
Bear Creek Arsenal	BC-10	Semi-automatic rifle	United States
Rossi	LWC	Single shot rifle	United States
Robinson Armament	XCR-M (Mini & Mid)	Semi-automatic rifle	United States

== See also ==
- 9×39mm
- .300 AAC Blackout
- .338 Whisper
- .338 Federal
- 6.5mm Creedmoor
- .30 Thompson Center
