= Fat Mac =

Fat Mac may refer to:

- Macintosh 512K, an early Apple Macintosh computer released in 1986, nicknamed "Fat Mac" due to its increased RAM
- .950 JDJ, a large caliber rifle developed by SSK Industries, nicknamed "Fat Mac"

== See also ==
- Mac (disambiguation)
