= USS Achernar =

Cargo ship of the United States Navy

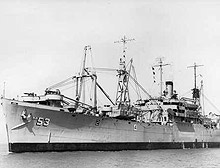
- USS Achernar (AKA-53)

History

United States
- Name: USS Achernar
- Namesake: The star Achernar in the constellation Eridanus
- Builder: Federal Shipbuilding and Drydock Co., Kearny, NJ
- Laid down: 6 September 1943
- Launched: 3 December 1943
- Commissioned: 31 January 1944
- Decommissioned: 1 July 1963
- Fate: Transferred to Spain; scrapped in 1982

General characteristics
- Class & type: Andromeda-class attack cargo ship
- Displacement: 14,200 tons
- Length: 459 ft 2 in (139.95 m)
- Beam: 63 ft (19 m)
- Draft: 26 ft 4 in (8.03 m)
- Speed: 16.5 knots (30.6 km/h)
- Complement: 429
- Armament: 1 × 5"/38 caliber gun; 8 × 40 mm Bofors guns; 18 × Oerlikon 20 mm cannon

USS Achernar (AKA-53) was an Andromeda-class attack cargo ship (a cargo ship designed to support amphibious warfare operations) of the United States Navy during World War II and after.

For the invasion of Normandy it was the command post of General Omar Bradley, commander of the US First Army.

She served as a commissioned ship for 19 years and 5 months.

== Construction ==
She was laid down under a Maritime Commission contract on 6 September 1943 at Kearney, New Jersey by Federal Shipbuilding and Drydock Co., launched on 3 December 1943, named after the star Achernar, sponsored by Mrs. Adela Rogers St. Johns, acquired by the Navy on 29 January 1944, and commissioned on 31 January 1944.

== World War II service ==
Following conversion and fitting out at the New York Navy Yard, Achernar held shakedown in the Chesapeake Bay. On 13 March, she arrived at Staten Island, New York – where she loaded cargo and embarked United States Army personnel for transportation to Britain travelling with Convoy CU-18. She arrived at Swansea, Wales on 30 March and spent the next two months transporting cargo and personnel between various ports in the United Kingdom in preparation for the Normandy invasion.

On 1 June 1944, she was designated as First Army's headquarters ship. On 6 June, she steamed from Plymouth across the English Channel and anchored in her preassigned position in Baie de la Seine, France. For the next few days, she acted as a nerve center for troops fighting for a foothold in France. On 11 June, the First Army's headquarters disembarked, and Achernar returned to England. After a three-day respite in Plymouth, the ship moved to Rosneath, Scotland to take on the cargo and personnel of two construction battalions. On 19 June, she returned to Plymouth to load materials to repair damaged assault craft and, on 22 June, got underway for the assault area in France. While on station, she underwent several enemy air attacks. Achernar left France on 29 June to return to England and arrived in Plymouth on 1 July. On 5 July, the ship was ordered to sail as a part of Task Group 120.6, which was bound for the Mediterranean Sea to support the invasion of southern France. It arrived at Oran, Algeria on 10 July; then six days later sailed to Naples. After loading cargo there, she moved to an anchorage at Castellammare, Italy on 2 August. Here, she embarked personnel of the 36th Infantry Division and proceeded to sea on 13 August for the landings in southern France. On the morning of 15 August, her crew commenced discharging her cargo and sending it to the beaches. The next day, after finishing the delivery of cargo, she received casualties on board and embarked 13 German prisoners of war before getting underway to return to Naples.

For the next two months, Achernar continued making trips from Naples and Oran to points along the southern coast of France. On 25 October, she sailed from Oran westward through the Strait of Gibraltar towards the United States. She arrived at Hampton Roads on 8 November and underwent repairs and overhaul at the Norfolk Navy Yard. On 7 December, Achernar got underway for a brief period of trials and exercises in Chesapeake Bay. The ship returned to Norfolk on 11 December, took on cargo, and got underway on 18 December. She transited the Panama Canal on Christmas Day 1944 and arrived at Pearl Harbor on 10 January 1945.

Following tactical maneuvers off Oahu from 17 to 19 January, the cargo ship began loading cargo on 12 February and put to sea on 18 February. Achernar stopped at Eniwetok on 26 February, Kossol Roads on 4 March, and anchored in San Pedro Bay, Philippine Islands, from 15 to 20 March, before arriving off Okinawa on 1 April to support the seizure of that key island. At 0043 the next day, a Japanese suicide plane hit the starboard side; and, almost simultaneously, a bomb exploded on her port side. Fires broke out, and the ship began listing slightly to port. Achernar lost five crew members killed and 41 injured.

By 0100, the fires were out and the list had been corrected. At 1525, Achernar transferred her casualties to USS Solace and proceeded to anchor off Hagushi beach, where temporary repairs began. On the morning of 3 April, Achernar moved to Kerama Retto to begin unloading her cargo. She remained at Okinawa until 19 April, when she sailed for the United States via Ulithi and Pearl Harbor. The vessel arrived at San Francisco on 13 May and began offloading ammunition and fuel. Two days later, she entered drydock for repairs and overhaul. She got underway again on 10 July for shakedown along the California coast. On 4 August, Achernar left San Francisco to return to Pearl Harbor, where she arrived a week later and immediately began discharging her cargo. She was still in Hawaii when hostilities ended on 15 August. Achernar then shuttled personnel and equipment between Japan, various other Pacific islands, and took part in "Magic Carpet" operations, returning veterans to the United States.

On 28 November, Achernar arrived in Seattle, Washington. One week later, SS H. H. Raymond collided with her during a storm. As a result of the damage she sustained in the accident, Achernar entered dry dock on 22 December for repairs. Achernar got underway again on 16 January 1946 and resumed operations between the west coast and various ports in the Far East and the Pacific. AKA 53 made two trips to the Pribiloff Islands bringing back to Seattle fur seal pelts and products for a Fouck Fur Company of Saint Louis. In 1947 she made a trip to the Philippines, Japan and China. Subic Bay, Yokuska, Shanghai, Tsingtao were visited but a scheduled visit to Tiensen was curtailed because of fighting between the Nationals and the Communists in 1947.

== Korean War service ==
When the Military Sea Transportation Service was formed on 1 October 1949, she was one of a group of attack cargo ships selected for service in the new organization. At the outbreak of the Korean War, Achernar was completing overhaul at the Hunters Point Naval Shipyard. She got underway on 7 July 1950 and soon began onloading troops and cargo for transportation to the war zone. On 14 July, the ship joined TG 53.7 and sailed for Japan. She unloaded her cargo at Kobe, Sasebo, and Yokosuka. On 22 September, she left Japan and proceeded to Inchon, Korea, to support nearby ground operations.

After American forces had liberated the territory near Inchon and Seoul, elements of the 1st Marine Division and their equipment were loaded on board Achernar for landing on the east coast of Korea at Wonsan. She sailed as part of TG 90.2 and arrived in Wonsan on 25 October. She unloaded her passengers and proceeded to Moji, Japan, arriving there on 31 October. There, she took on men of the 2nd Infantry Division for transportation to Wonsan. Following this mission, she returned to Yokosuka on 20 November.

The attack cargo ship was then ordered to report back to the United States. She left Japan on 27 November accompanying the destroyers USS Brush and USS Mansfield – both of which had been damaged by naval mines – ready to assist them, if necessary. They made brief stops at Midway and Pearl Harbor before reaching San Francisco on 17 December.

Following a short availability period, Achernar went to Port Hueneme, California on 18 January 1951 to onload cargo and personnel for transportation to the Aleutians. After unloading at Amchitka, she visited Adak, Whittier, Alaska, and Kodiak Island to pick up cargo to be returned to Seattle. On 17 March, Achernar set course for Norfolk. She transited the Panama Canal on 26 March; paused at Morehead City, North Carolina on 1 April; and finally arrived at Norfolk on 3 April. The ship was assigned to the Amphibious Force, Atlantic Fleet, and took part in various fleet exercises and cargo runs in the Caribbean and along the east coast. On 18 February 1956, Achernar was decommissioned, placed in reserve, and berthed at Orange, Texas.

== Later service and decommissioning ==
Achernar was placed back in commission at New Orleans on 1 September 1961. She arrived at Norfolk on 1 December 1961 and became a unit of Amphibious Squadron 6, Atlantic Fleet. Achernar held shakedown in the Caribbean and spent the remainder of her career conducting various training exercises in the Virginia capes operating area.

Achernar was again placed out of commission on 1 July 1963 and transferred to the Maritime Administration. She was reacquired by the Navy on 29 January 1964 but saw no active service before she was transferred to the government of Spain on 2 February 1965. She served the Spanish Navy as Castilla (TA-21) until scrapped in 1982.

Achernar received three battle stars for World War II service and three battle stars for Korean War service.
