= .277 Wolverine =

Wildcat cartridge

- Type: Rifle
- Place of origin: United States

Production history
- Designer: Mark Kexel, Mad Dog Weapon Systems, Inc.
- Designed: 2014

Specifications
- Parent case: 5.56×45mm NATO
- Case type: Rimless, Bottleneck
- Bullet diameter: 0.277 in (7.04 mm)
- Neck diameter: 0.3089 in (7.85 mm)
- Shoulder diameter: 0.356 in (9.04 mm)
- Base diameter: 0.377 in (9.58 mm)
- Rim diameter: 0.378 in (9.60 mm)
- Case length: 1.530-1.535 in (38.86 mm, trim) to 1.545 in (39.24 mm, max.)
- Overall length: 2.26 in (57.40 mm) max. COAL (typical)
- Rifling twist: 1:7 (subsonic/supersonic), 1:11 (supersonic)
- Primer type: Small rifle

Ballistic performance
Bullet mass/type	Velocity	Energy
85 gr (6 g)	2,800 ft/s (850 m/s)	1,480 ft⋅lbf (2,010 J)
90 gr (6 g)	2,750 ft/s (840 m/s)	1,510 ft⋅lbf (2,050 J)
95 gr (6 g)	2,650 ft/s (810 m/s)	1,480 ft⋅lbf (2,010 J)
100 gr (6 g)	2,600 ft/s (790 m/s)	1,500 ft⋅lbf (2,000 J)
110 gr (7 g)	2,500 ft/s (760 m/s)	1,525 ft⋅lbf (2,068 J)
- Test barrel length: 16 in Source

The .277 Wolverine (6.8x39mm) is a wildcat cartridge. It is a multi-purpose mid-power cartridge with increased ballistic performance over the AR-15's traditional .223 Remington (5.56×45mm NATO) cartridge. The use of a modified 5.56 case means that at minimum, only a new barrel is needed to convert any 5.56-based firearm to .277 Wolverine.

== Design ==
Because mass-to-diameter-to-length for mid-weight bullets is constrained to loading in an AR-15/M16 STANAG magazine, 6.8 mm became the caliber for the new AR-15 wildcat. The .277 Wolverine is based on the widely available 5.56×45mm parent case. Therefore, rifle components such as the bolt and magazine are interchangeable between 5.56×45mm and .277 Wolverine firearms, and standard AR-15 magazines can be used with no loss of capacity. A new barrel is the minimum required component to convert a standard AR-15 to .277 Wolverine.

In order to load heavier (therefore longer) bullets to magazine length without the problems of seating the bullet's ogive into the case mouth, the Wolverine case is shortened to approximately 39 mm from its 45 mm parent brass. The case is resized and formed in a single-step operation to create new 23-degree shoulder and larger neck.

Initial design focused on optimal performance with supersonic bullets in the 85-115 gr (5.5-7.5 g) class, therefore a 1:11 twist rate barrel with 5R rifling was selected. Subsequent consumer interest in firing "heavy-for-caliber" subsonic bullets led to the design, testing, and production of 1:7 twist barrels to stabilize the longer heavier bullets.

== Development ==
Initially developed, tested, and marketed as a proprietary cartridge, MDWS publicly released the detailed chamber and headspace specifications for the .277 Wolverine in June 2015.

At least four commercial manufacturers have produced .277 Wolverine barrels, mostly for AR-15 conversions, although MDWS also sells barrels for Savage and Remington bolt-action rifles. Barrel manufacturers include X-Caliber, McGowen, AR Precision, and PAC-NOR. By the end of April 2016, more than 1,000 .277 Wolverine barrels had been sold, with more than 2,000 by mid-November 2017. Barrels lengths include: 8.2, 10.5, 12.5, and 14.5 inch pistol; 16, 18, and 20 inch rifle.

.277 Wolverine cases are easily made by the hobbyist reloader from plentiful and inexpensive 5.56×45mm brass (shortened and resized). Extensive reloading data (including chronographed velocity, accuracy, and ballistic gel testing) is available. Ready-to-load brass and/or loaded ammunition is available commercially from several sources including: JB's Firearms, LLC and OutdoorShooterSupply. Reloading dies and tools are available from Hornady, Lee Precision, Sheridan Engineering, CH4D, and Little Crow Gun Works. The fire-formed .277 Wolverine case holds approximately 27.5-27.8 gr of water, compared to 28.5-28.8 gr for the parent case.

In October 2017, Starline produced 50,000 newly manufactured cases head-stamped ".277 WLV" for MDWS; all were sold in under 72 hours of posting. Starline lists the .277 Wolverine on their website as a standard offering.

== Performance ==
The .277 Wolverine has shown near-comparable performance to the 6.8 SPC with 110 gr (7.13 g) bullets, achieving similar muzzle velocities of 2,500 fps (762 m/s) vs. 2,700 fps (823 m/s). The smaller case of the .277 Wolverine (compared to the 6.8 SPC) is more efficient and has less recoil due to its smaller propellant load.

With lighter bullets in the 80-90 gr range (5.2-5.8 g), the velocities were slightly slower than typical 5.56×45mm rounds, but the .277 Wolverine provided substantially increased energy due to greater bullet mass. For example, 60-62 gr bullets (3.9-4.0 g) from a 5.56×45mm round typically provide less than 1,200 ft·lbs (1,627 J) of energy, while 85-90 gr bullets (5.5-5.8 g) from a .277 Wolverine round provide over 1,500 ft·lbs (2,034 J) of energy (both measured at the muzzle of a 16-inch barrel).

There are always trade-offs between cartridge size, bullet diameter and weight, muzzle velocity, and energy on-target (at any given range). The .277 Wolverine will never replace larger high-power cartridges such as the .308 Winchester (7.62×51mm NATO) or .270 Winchester for long range shooting; however – it outperforms the .223 Remington at typical hunting ranges and approaches the 6.8 SPC while using less expensive components (brass, magazines, bolt, less powder per load).

The following table provides comparative performance data for several factory cartridges in the mid-power AR-15 class:

Round	Bullet weight	Barrel length	Muzzle velocity	Ballistic coefficient(G1)	Energy at 300 yards
5.56×45mm (M855)	62 gr (4.0 g)	16 in (410 mm)	2,900 ft/s (880 m/s)	0.304	579 ft⋅lbf (785 J)
7.62×39mm	123 gr (8.0 g)	16.5 in (420 mm)	2,300 ft/s (700 m/s)	0.300	633 ft⋅lbf (858 J)
300 BLK	110 gr (7.1 g)	16 in (410 mm)	2,300 ft/s (700 m/s)	0.300	622 ft⋅lbf (843 J)
300 BLK	125 gr (8.1 g)	16 in (410 mm)	2,200 ft/s (670 m/s)	0.320	644 ft⋅lbf (873 J)
.277 Wolverine	90 gr (5.8 g)	16 in (410 mm)	2,750 ft/s (840 m/s)	0.275	736 ft⋅lbf (998 J)
.277 Wolverine	100 gr (6.5 g)	16 in (410 mm)	2,600 ft/s (790 m/s)	0.323	754 ft⋅lbf (1,022 J)
.277 Wolverine	110 gr (7.1 g)	16 in (410 mm)	2,500 ft/s (760 m/s)	0.370	837 ft⋅lbf (1,135 J)

== Applications ==
The .277 Wolverine provides similar ballistic performance to the 6.8 SPC for accuracy, hunting (varmints to medium-game), target shooting, and home/personal defense.

The complete bolt carrier group (carrier, bolt, firing pin, and cam pin) and charging handle can be swapped between the original 5.56×45 and the .277 Wolverine upper.

== See also ==
- .25-45 Sharps
- 6.8mm Remington SPC
- 7.62×40mm Wilson Tactical
- Glossary of firearms terminology
- List of AR platform cartridges
- List of rifle cartridges
- Table of handgun and rifle cartridges
