= .300 Whisper =

Rifle cartridge

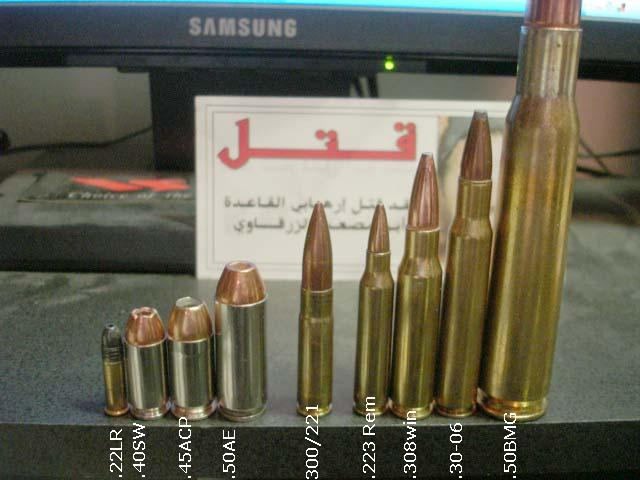
- The .300 Whisper, displayed center.
- Type: Rifle
- Place of origin: United States

Production history
- Designed: c. 1990

Specifications
- Parent case: .221 Fireball/.223 Remington
- Case type: Rimless, Bottleneck
- Bullet diameter: 7.84 mm (0.309 in)
- Neck diameter: 8.46 mm (0.333 in)
- Shoulder diameter: 9.14 mm (0.360 in)
- Base diameter: 9.54 mm (0.376 in)
- Rim diameter: 9.60 mm (0.378 in)
- Rim thickness: 1.14 mm (0.045 in)
- Case length: 34.90 mm (1.374 in)
- Overall length: 57.00 mm (2.244 in)
- Rifling twist: 1:203.20 mm (8.000 in)
- Primer type: Small rifle
- Maximum pressure (CIP): 3,700 bar (53,660 psi)

Ballistic performance
Bullet mass/type	Velocity	Energy
220 gr (14 g) JHP	1,040 ft/s (320 m/s)	529 ft⋅lbf (717 J)
- Test barrel length: 16 in Source: CIP specifications COR-BON Ammunition

The .300 Whisper (7.82×34mm) is a cartridge in the Whisper family, a group of cartridges developed in the early 1990s by J.D. Jones of SSK Industries. It was developed as a multi-purpose cartridge, capable of utilizing relatively lightweight bullets at supersonic velocities as well as heavier bullets (200–250 grains) at subsonic velocities. It was formerly standardized by the C.I.P.

.300 Whisper is also sometimes known as .300 Fireball or .300-221, but the .300 Whisper is a (former) CIP cartridge and other names are generally known as wildcat cartridges. When compared to .300 AAC Blackout Steve Johnson's article in American Hunter sums it up best:

Given the fact that major manufacturers such as Hornady are building ammunition headstamped .300 Whisper and recommending it for use in either platform—in addition to producing reloading dies that are marked "300 Whisper/Blackout" and Smith & Wesson stamps the barrel of its M&P-15 Whisper barrels with: "300 Whisper/300 AAC Blackout" it is safe to say that differences are minimal.

== Standardization ==
The C.I.P. produced a standard for .300 Whisper on May 5, 2009, and last revised it on May 19, 2015. The .300 Whisper was on the C.I.P. list of drawings dated from at least July 2014 until December 2017, but has disappeared from the list dated April 2015.

It is unknown when the removal happened. Because the .300 AAC Blackout was first standardized by the C.I.P. on May 19, 2015, there exists a period when C.I.P. has standards for both cartridges showing slightly different dimensions. The May 2017 revision of C.I.P.'s .300 AAC Blackout drawing has the notable addition of a list of "alternative names", which includes .300 Whisper. However, as mentioned above, the separate standard for .300 Whisper was not removed with that revision and was present in 2018.

== Design ==
The .300 Whisper was originally based on the .221 Fireball case necked up to .30 caliber. Reloaders have found the .223 Remington or 5.56×45mm NATO works well when shortened and resized to .30 caliber. Firing in the .300 Whisper chamber results in a slightly sharper shoulder.

Magnum pistol powders such as H110 work well for supersonic loads. Sierra 240 grain (16 g) jacketed bullets work well if the barrel has a 1:8 twist. Barrels with a 1:10 twist will stabilize 220 grain (14 g) bullets at subsonic speeds. 125 grain (8 g) bullets will reach 2,400 ft/s (730 m/s).

There are a few points regarding the utility of the .300 Whisper:

- Supersonic loads are capable of matching ballistics of the 7.62×39mm and coming close to the ballistics of the .30-30 Winchester (which shoots a heavier bullet at similar velocities), making the .300 Whisper a capable short range deer hunting cartridge.
- The use of heavy bullets, along with the low powder weight and small case capacity, make the .300 Whisper ideal for use with sound suppressors. These subsonic loads offer energy levels similar to that of the popular .45 ACP pistol cartridge, but range is substantially increased due to the longer, more aerodynamic, .30 caliber bullet.
- Any firearm with a .223 Remington bolt face can be converted to .300 Whisper by re-barreling the action. As such, the .300 Whisper works well in AR-15–based rifles, especially when some type of gas regulator is installed.

=== .223 Rem as parent case ===
Cases for the .300 Whisper can alternatively be formed from common and plentiful .223 Remington brass by sizing and trimming to length. However, J.D. Jones has recommended against this, citing the difference in case thickness at the neck (compared to the .221 Fireball) as a potential issue. This problem can be exacerbated when military 5.56×45mm cases are used.

The Whisper name is trademarked thus: the only firearms with a .300 Whisper chamber are those from J.D. Jones and Thompson Center, which licensed the name. All other guns are cut to .300/221 which has different chamber specifications than the Whisper, particularly in neck wall thickness. Because the .300 Whisper is a wildcat cartridge there were no established Sporting Arms and Ammunition Manufacturers' Institute (SAAMI) specifications for the chamber reamers, and the necks were cut to allow for standard .308 neck thickness, which is approximately the same thickness as produced from forming .223 brass. Typically only guns with Whisper chambers will have problems with .223 brass: .300/221 chambers work very well with .223 brass, and the .223 brass is considerably stronger than .221 brass.

== Applications ==
In addition to special applications in suppressed firearms, the .300 Whisper has become popular with metallic silhouette shooters due to its low recoil, good long range performance, and high accuracy.

== Trademark ==
SSK Industries has a registration for the wordmark "Whisper" (reg. no. 1898840) in class 13 (ammunition). In order to sidestep this branding and/or avoid licensing fees required to use the "Whisper" name legally, other manufacturers tend to use different names for identical or highly similar cartridges. These include ".300 warrior carbine", ".300 Fireball" or ".300-221", both based on the .221 Fireball parent case. The .300 AAC Blackout has succeeded as a commercial cartridge while the Whisper never achieved wide acceptance.

== See also ==
- Whisper Family of Firearm Cartridges
- List of rifle cartridges
- Table of handgun and rifle cartridges
- .300 AAC Blackout
- .458 SOCOM
- .450 Bushmaster
- .50 Beowulf
- 7×33mm Sako
- 9×39mm
