= .300 AAC Blackout =

Rifle cartridge originally designed for use in the M4 carbine

7.62×35 mm/300 AAC Blackout
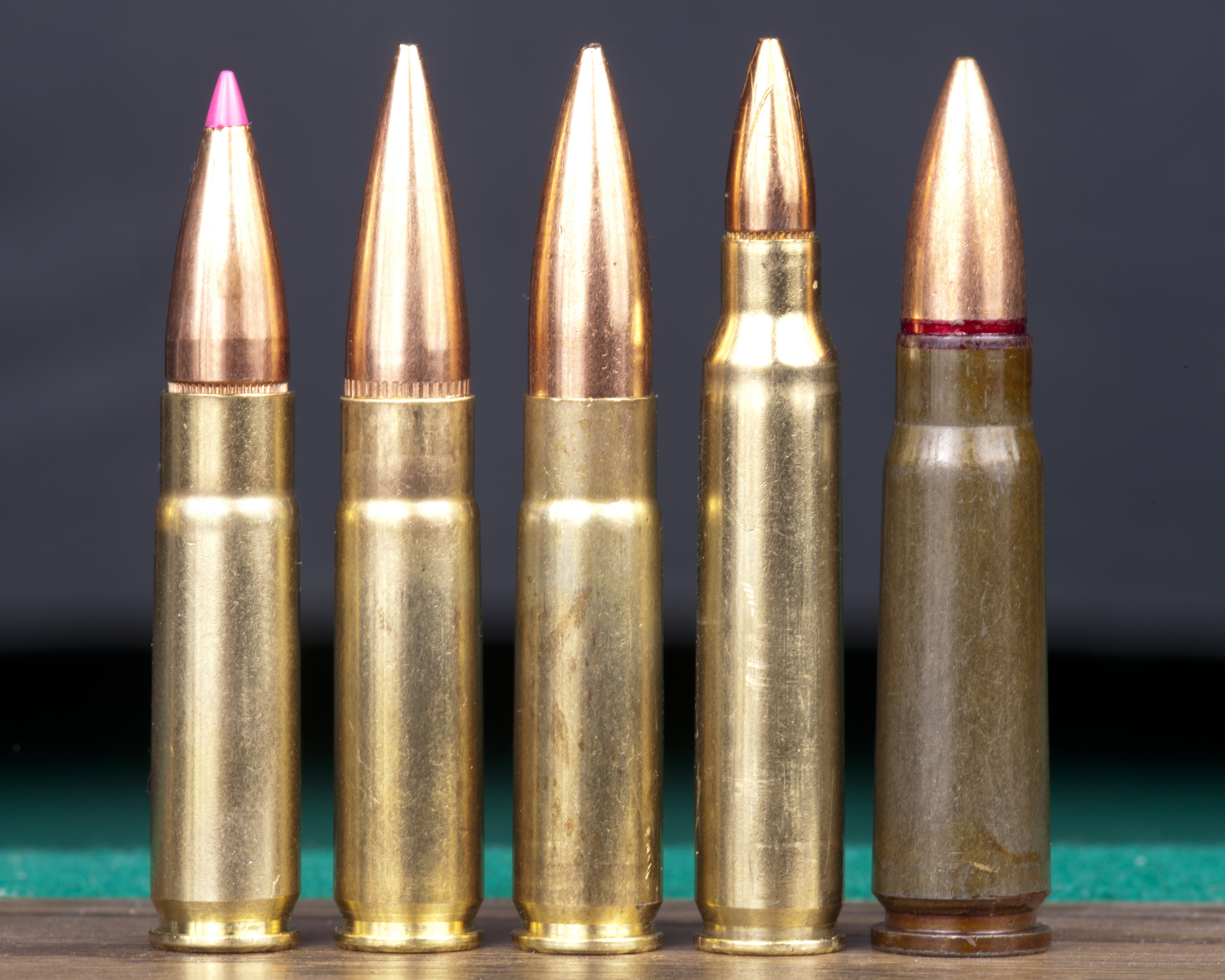
- The .300 AAC Blackout plastic tipped, left, compared to .300 AAC Blackout 125 gr match, .300 AAC Blackout 220 gr subsonic, 5.56×45mm NATO, and 7.62×39mm.
- Type: Rifle
- Place of origin: United States

Production history
- Designed: 2009
- Produced: 2010–present

Specifications
- Parent case: .221 Fireball/.223 Remington
- Case type: Rimless, bottleneck
- Bullet diameter: .308 in (7.8 mm)
- Land diameter: .300 in (7.6 mm)
- Neck diameter: .332 in (8.4 mm)
- Base diameter: .3759 in (9.55 mm)
- Rim diameter: .378 in (9.6 mm)
- Case length: 1.368 in (34.7 mm)
- Overall length: 2.26 in (57 mm)
- Case capacity: 25.1 gr H_{2}O (1.63 cm^{3})
- Rifling twist: 1/8 inch (203 mm)
- Primer type: Small rifle
- Maximum pressure (SAAMI): 55,000 psi (380 MPa)
- Maximum pressure (CIP): 56,565 psi (390.00 MPa)
- Maximum CUP: 52,000 CUP

Ballistic performance
Bullet mass/type	Velocity	Energy
78 gr (5 g) Lehigh Defense CQ	2,800 ft/s (850 m/s)	1,358 ft⋅lbf (1,841 J)
90 gr (6 g) Barnes OTFB	2,550 ft/s (780 m/s)	1,300 ft⋅lbf (1,800 J)
110 gr (7 g) Hornady Black V-MAX	2,375 ft/s (724 m/s)	1,377 ft⋅lbf (1,867 J)
125 gr (8 g) OTM	2,215 ft/s (675 m/s)	1,360 ft⋅lbf (1,840 J)
150 gr (10 g) Winchester Power Point	1,650 ft/s (500 m/s)	907 ft⋅lbf (1,230 J)
220 gr (14 g) OTM	1,010 ft/s (310 m/s)	498 ft⋅lbf (675 J)
- Test barrel length: 16 in

The .300 AAC Blackout (abbreviated as 300 BLK by the SAAMI and 300 AAC Blackout by the C.I.P.), also known as 7.62×35 mm, is an intermediate cartridge developed in the United States by Advanced Armament Corporation (AAC) for use in the M4 carbine. The cartridge yields increased performance in shorter barrels and effective subsonic performance for suppressor use when compared to 5.56 mm NATO. The .300 AAC Blackout uses standard 5.56 mm NATO magazines and components with the exception of the barrel.

== History ==
Although 5.56×45mm NATO has been widely adopted in the NATO armies, the nature of the missions encountered by some special operations groups often requires a round that provides better performance than that available in the high-energy, standard velocity rounds, and subsonic performance greater than standard 9×19mm Parabellum (the ubiquitous pistol and submachine gun round).

To meet this demand, AAC developed the .300 AAC Blackout in cooperation with Remington Defense. The new cartridge was intended to negate many of the perceived drawbacks inherent to other large caliber cartridges used in the M4. Colt Firearms and other arms makers had previously chambered AR-pattern rifles and carbines in various .30 caliber rounds but encountered problems. In the case of the 7.62×39 mm, its relatively severe case angle caused feeding issues unless specially modified AK magazines were used, and even then results were unsatisfactory. Modified bolts were also needed owing to its larger case head diameter. Rounds such as the 6.8 SPC and 6.5 Grendel had similar parts-interchangeability issues but did allow for the use of the standard M4/M16 30-round magazine, albeit with a reduced capacity.

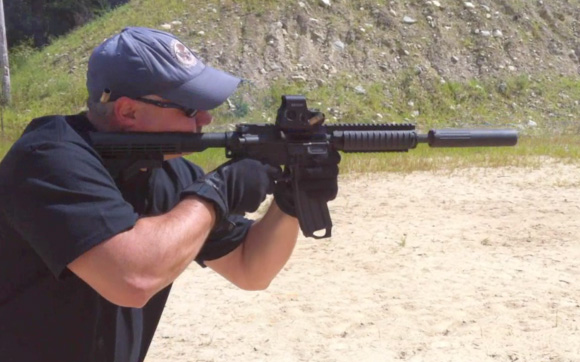
.300 AAC Blackout rounds shot from a suppressed M4 carbine

Wildcat cartridges such as the .300 Whisper series addressed these issues, but their widespread use in single-shot handguns and lack of industry standard cartridge dimension meant that a great number of the popular loads on both the supersonic and subsonic end of the spectrum were less than ideal in the AR pattern weapons. Many of these rounds required an excessively long overall cartridge length that would prohibit feeding in a STANAG magazine while using powder charges that were not compatible with the pressure requirements of the M4 carbine. This was particularly noticeable when using subsonic ammunition in conjunction with a suppressor, as short stroking and excessive fouling would occur, similar to that which was seen in the earliest variants of the M16 in Vietnam.

The designers planned several cartridges primarily for the M4 and M16 during load development that not only satisfied the ballistic requirements, but also ensured mechanical reliability with only a simple barrel change necessary for complete conversion.

Robert Silvers, director of research and development for AAC said,

We started development in 2009, but most of the work was done in 2010. A military customer wanted a way to be able to shoot .30-cal. bullets from an M4 platform while using normal bolts and magazines, and without losing the full 30-round capacity of standard magazines. They also wanted a source for ammunition made to their specs. We could not have just used .300-221 or .300 Whisper because Remington is a SAAMI company, and will only load ammunition that is a SAAMI-standard cartridge. We had to take the .300-221 wildcat concept, determine the final specs for it, and submit it to SAAMI. We did that, and called it the .300 AAC Blackout (.300 BLK).

.300 AAC Blackout was approved by SAAMI on January 17, 2011. It was later revised on May 20, 2022.

On October 23, 2011, Staff Sergeant Daniel Horner of the United States Army Marksmanship Unit used .300 AAC Blackout to win his fourth USPSA Multi Gun National Championship before the rules were changed to negate its advantages in such competitions.

.300 AAC Blackout was approved by the C.I.P. on May 19, 2015. It underwent a revision on May 17, 2017. It was last revised on October 17, 2018.

== Military use ==
=== Netherlands ===
In July 2015, the Netherlands' Defense Material Organization issued a tender for 195 carbines chambered in 300 BLK on behalf of the Dutch Maritime Special Operations Force (NL-MARSOF). The intention was to purchase ball, subsonic, and lead-free frangible cartridges, representing the first formal military adoption of the .300 AAC Blackout. In December 2016, the NL-MARSOF acquired 195 integrally suppressed SIG MCX carbines fitted with a new folding stock, developed for use with ballistic visor helmets, chambered in .300 AAC blackout, becoming the first publicly-known military user of the cartridge.

=== United Kingdom ===
On 14 July 2017, the UK Ministry of Defence issued a tender for a five year (plus five years optional) contract to supply .300 Blackout supersonic and subsonic small arms ammunition. Also noted was that the ammunition type had already been in use.

=== United States ===
In May 2022, United States Special Operations Command selected SIG Sauer to deliver its MCX Rattler personal defense weapon, which can be chambered in both 5.56 NATO and .300 Blackout. With a barrel length of 5.5 in (140 mm), the .300 Blackout allows the Rattler to fire a powerful round while being compact.

=== Germany ===
The H&K 437 semi-automatic-only version will become the standard medium range weapon for the state police of Schleswig-Holstein (i.e., one as backup in every patrol car), replacing both the old MP5 and about 200 SIG MCX that have to be replaced due to technical issues. A total of 1,700 rifles will be procured between 2024 and 2026.

In February 2024, the procurement order for about a thousand H&K 437 rifles for the German Army's Special Forces KSK was issued. The rifle ("Sonderwaffe schallgedämpft Spezialkräfte" = "special weapon, silenced, special forces") will be known in Bundeswehr service as G39.

=== Taiwan ===
Since 2023, the Coast Guard Administration Special Task Force (CGA.STF) of Taiwan has allocated budgetary resources to procure eight categories of tactical equipment, aimed at enhancing its counter-terrorism and close-quarters battle (CQB) capabilities. The procurement includes sniper rifles, handheld thermal imaging laser rangefinders, handgun suppressors, and submachine guns. A specific budget of NT$7.7 million was designated for the acquisition of 70 new compact weapon systems; during the evaluation process, the unit assessed both traditional 9mm submachine guns and short-barreled rifles chambered for the 7.62×35mm (.300 AAC Blackout) cartridge. The SIG Sauer MCX Rattler LT was ultimately selected and incorporated into the procurement list to meet the unit's operational requirements.

== Performance ==
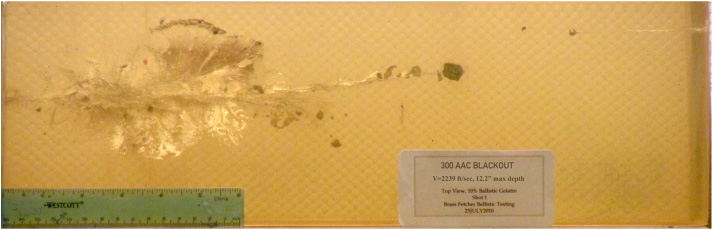
Example of a .300 AAC Blackout shot in a block of gel

Supersonic ammunition muzzle velocities and muzzle energies by barrel length:

Barrel	Cartridge	Velocity	Energy
9 in (230 mm) barrel	300 AAC Blackout, 115 gr UMC	2,120 ft/s (650 m/s)	1,136 ft⋅lbf (1,540 J)
16 in (410 mm) barrel	300 AAC Blackout, 115 gr UMC	2,295 ft/s (700 m/s)	1,344 ft⋅lbf (1,822 J)
9 in (230 mm) barrel	300 AAC Blackout, 110 gr TTSX	2,300 ft/s (700 m/s)	1,310 ft⋅lbf (1,780 J)
9 in (230 mm) barrel	300 AAC Blackout, 110 gr VMAX	2,350 ft/s (720 m/s)	1,350 ft⋅lbf (1,830 J)
9 in (230 mm) barrel	300 AAC Blackout, 125 gr OTM	2,030 ft/s (620 m/s)	1,143 ft⋅lbf (1,550 J)
16 in (410 mm) barrel	300 AAC Blackout, 125 gr OTM	2,215 ft/s (675 m/s)	1,360 ft⋅lbf (1,840 J)
20 in (510 mm) barrel	300 AAC Blackout, 78 gr Lehigh Defense CQ	2,880 ft/s (880 m/s)	1,436 ft⋅lbf (1,947 J)
24 in (610 mm) barrel	300 AAC Blackout, 78 gr Lehigh Defense CQ	2,960 ft/s (900 m/s)	1,517 ft⋅lbf (2,057 J)
20 in (510 mm) barrel	300 AAC Blackout, 90 gr Barnes OTFB	2,630 ft/s (800 m/s)	1,382 ft⋅lbf (1,874 J)
24 in (610 mm) barrel	300 AAC Blackout, 90 gr Barnes OTFB	2,710 ft/s (830 m/s)	1,468 ft⋅lbf (1,990 J)

The 300 AAC Blackout was designed to achieve energies similar to the 7.62×39mm Soviet in an AR-15 while using standard AR magazines at their full capacity. The 7.62 Soviet's cartridge taper prevented reliable feeding in AR magazines and created wear on the bolt. From the 14.5 in (370 mm) barrel of the M4 carbine, the M855 5.56×45mm round has an effective point target range of 500 meters. The bullet has significant drop, drift, and energy loss at that distance. From a 16 in (410 mm) barrel, a 125 gr (8.1 g) .300 BLK round has a lower velocity and similar bullet drop and drift at shorter distances. However, it has the same amount of energy at 700 meters that the M855 has at 500 meters. In terms of hit probability, the Blackout has an effective range of 460 meters. From a 9 in (230 mm) barrel, the 125 gr BLK round has the same muzzle energy as the M855 from the M4, and 5 percent more energy at 440 meters. In comparison with 7.62×39 mm rounds, .300 BLK rounds with varying loads have better ballistic coefficients and more energy out of similar length barrels. 300 BLK rounds like the Barnes TAC 110 grain, have "barrier blind" performance, being capable of penetration through several inches of different hard targets. 300 BLK allows a user to have one firearm with the capability of switching between subsonic, supersonic VMAX or barrier penetrating ammunition all with just the change of a magazine. It is able to replace the H&K MP5 for close quarters, and with just a magazine change, bring the fight to longer distances, outperforming the M4 carbine. The .30 caliber cartridge has an 89.1 percent increase in frontal bullet area over the 5.56×45 mm, and so leaves a larger wound cavity in soft targets. It also penetrates deeper and initially yaws faster. 300 BLK rounds are effective out of barrels as short as 4.5 in (110 mm). Weapons chambered for the round can be as light, compact, and quiet when suppressed as submachine guns like the 9×19mm MP5, 5.7x28mm FN P90, and 4.6×30mm MP7 while having more energy and accuracy at longer range.

Round	Weight	Barrel length	Muzzle velocity	Range for 100 in (2.5 m) of bullet drop	Range for 41 in (1.0 m) of bullet drift	Range for 291 ft⋅lbf (395 J) of energy	Effective range
M855 5.56×45 mm	62 gr (4.0 g)	14.5 in (370 mm)	2,900 ft/s (880 m/s)	500 m (550 yd)	500 m (550 yd)	500 m (550 yd)	500 m (550 yd)
300 BLK	125 gr (8.1 g)	16 in (410 mm)	2,220 ft/s (680 m/s)	440 m (480 yd)	484 m (529 yd)	700 m (770 yd)	460 m (500 yd)
300 BLK	125 gr (8.1 g)	9 in (230 mm)	2,050 ft/s (620 m/s)	410 m (450 yd)	470 m (510 yd)	625 m (684 yd)	440 m (480 yd)

Round	Weight	Barrel length	Muzzle velocity	Ballistic coefficient	Energy at 300 meters
7.62×39 mm	123 gr (8.0 g)	16.5 in (420 mm)	2,396 ft/s (730 m/s)	0.280	712 J (525 ft⋅lbf)
300 BLK	115 gr (7.5 g)	16 in (410 mm)	2,295 ft/s (700 m/s)	0.300	777 J (573 ft⋅lbf)
300 BLK	125 gr (8.1 g)	16 in (410 mm)	2,220 ft/s (680 m/s)	0.320	829 J (611 ft⋅lbf)

Compared to the 6.8×43 mm Special Purpose Cartridge, another round made to have increased stopping power over the 5.56 NATO, the 300 Blackout has different capabilities. The 300 BLK was designed with a specific shorter-range focus to have equal or more energy than the 7.62 Soviet and work reliably with suppressors. The earlier 6.8 SPC was simply designed to have more energy at all ranges than the 5.56×45 mm. It has a relatively small projectile with a high velocity that maintains performance at range. At 200 yd (183 m), the 300 BLK drops 2 in (51 mm) lower than the 6.8 SPC, while it drops 30 in (760 mm) lower at 500 yd (457 m). The 115 gr (7.5 g) 6.8-round has a higher muzzle energy of 1,694 ft⋅lb (2,297 J) due to its greater velocity, while the 125 gr (8.1 g) 300 BLK round has a muzzle energy of 1,360 ft⋅lb (1,840 J). Both rounds were made to be used in an easily converted AR-15. The 6.8 SPC has a more difficult conversion because it was designed around the obsolete .30 Remington cartridge, requiring a different bolt and decreasing standard magazine capacity. The 300 BLK was made specifically for ease of conversion, so the standard bolt will work and a magazine can be used to its full capacity, so the only change needed is the barrel and gas system.

== Potential hazards ==
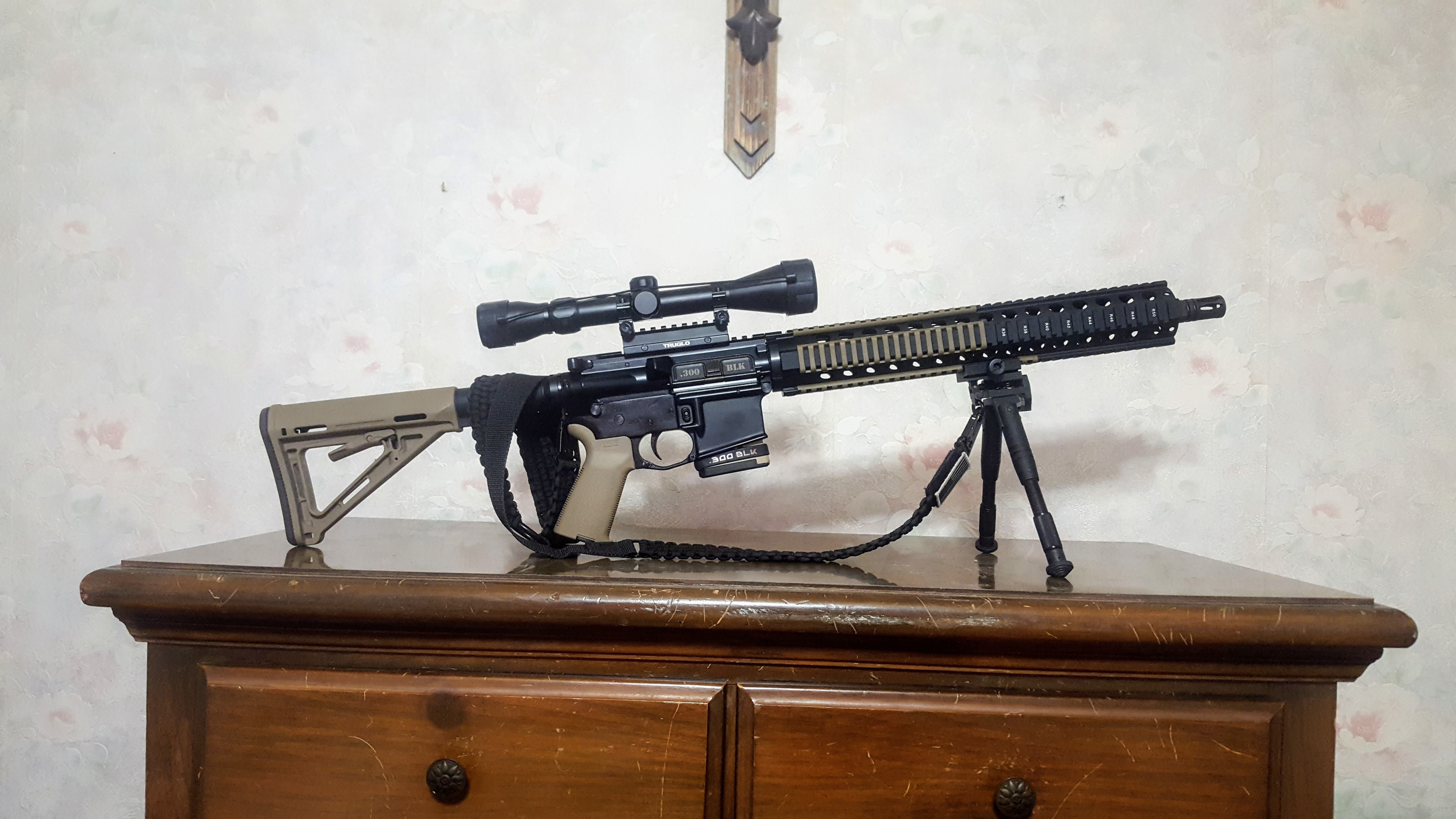
AR-15 rifle with dustcover and magazine band that identify it as having a chambering of .300 AAC Blackout

The advantage of the 300 BLK (its similarity to the popular .223/5.56 caliber) can also be a safety issue if ammunition of the two calibers is mixed. Because of similar chamber dimensions between the two calibers, SAAMI has listed the combination of using a 300 BLK round in a .223 chamber as unsafe. Since the bullet of the 300 BLK is larger than the bore of the .223 caliber, chambering and firing causes excessive pressure to build up since the bullet has nowhere to go, which can cause the rifle to explode resulting in risk of injury or death. Since the mix up can easily be done, some suggest owners of firearms in both calibers carefully separate firearm and ammunition of the two types by, for instance, clearly marking the firearms and magazines, and visually inspect every round while loading magazines. Whether a 300 BLK cartridge actually is able to chamber in a .223 barrel depends on bullet length and shape, bullet seating depth, crimping, and the volume of powder charge. Ideally, cartridges would use one of the longer projectiles, a case-filling powder charge, and have the projectile crimped into place.

== Predecessors ==
- Pioneering work by the USAF Armament Lab at Eglin Air Force Base in the late 1960s produced the 7.62×28mm cartridge, which propelled a 172 gr match projectile to about 1,050 ft/s (320 m/s) but suffered from various reliability issues.
- More recently, popular wildcats such the .300-221, 300 Fireball, and JD Jones's proprietary version of them, the .300 Whisper, advanced the concept. The .300 AAC Blackout is a SAAMI-standardized .300-221. Hornady states that any rifle chambered for the 300 AAC Blackout can shoot their .300 Whisper ammunition, which is made within .300 AAC Blackout specs. The reloading dies for these two cartridges are often the same. The C.I.P. lists the following as alternative names for 300 AAC Blackout: 300 Whisper, 300 BLK, 7,62 x 35.

== See also ==
- 6mm ARC
- .277 Wolverine
- 7×33mm Sako
- 7.62×37mm Musang
- 7.92×33mm Kurz
- 7.62×40mm Wilson Tactical
- 9×39mm
- List of rifle cartridges
- Table of handgun and rifle cartridges
