= 7.62×40mm Wilson Tactical =

Rifle cartridge

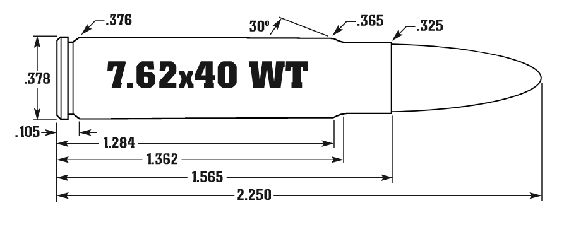
- Type: Rifle
- Place of origin: United States of America

Production history
- Designer: Kurt Buckert
- Designed: 2011
- Manufacturer: Wilson Combat
- Produced: 2011-present

Specifications
- Parent case: 5.56×45mm NATO
- Case type: Rimless, bottleneck
- Bullet diameter: .308 (7.82 mm)
- Base diameter: .377 (9.58 mm)
- Rim diameter: .378 (9.6 mm)
- Rim thickness: .045 (1.14 mm)
- Case length: 1.565 (39.75 mm).
- Overall length: 2.250 (57.15 mm)
- Rifling twist: 1-12"
- Primer type: Small rifle

Ballistic performance
Bullet mass/type	Velocity	Energy
110 gr (7 g) Sierra HP	2,600 ft/s (790 m/s)	1,650 ft⋅lbf (2,240 J)
110 gr (7 g) Barnes TTSX	2,400 ft/s (730 m/s)	1,407 ft⋅lbf (1,908 J)
125 gr (8 g) Nosler Ballistic Tip	2,350 ft/s (720 m/s)	1,533 ft⋅lbf (2,078 J)
125 gr (8 g) Speer TNT	2,400 ft/s (730 m/s)	1,598 ft⋅lbf (2,167 J)
- Test barrel length: 20" for the 110gr Sierra HP, 16" for all others Source: http://shopwilsoncombat.com/Wilson-Combat-Custom-Ammunition/products/414/

The 7.62×40mm Wilson Tactical (7.62×40mm WT) is a centerfire rifle cartridge introduced in 2011 by Wilson Combat. The goal was to produce an accurate, low-recoil .30-caliber hunting cartridge that could be used in an AR-15-type rifle using as many standard components as possible.

== Design ==
The 7.62×40mm WT (Wilson Tactical) is based on the 7.62×40mm wildcat cartridge, the shoulder of the WT was moved .003" forward and the throat was made .001" larger to accommodate mass-production tolerances while staying within the tolerance of the original reloading die tooling of the 7.62×40mm. The parent case (5.56×45mm NATO) was trimmed down to 1.560" and re-sized with a 7.62×40mm WT sizing die. The overall case length after the shortening and re-sizing is 1.565". The cartridge was designed to use .308" diameter bullets in weights of 110 to 150 grains, with a standard twist rate of 1-12". Wilson Combat states that heavier bullets can be used in a barrel with a 1-8" twist rate for subsonic loads.

== Cartridge use ==
Wilson had been hunting feral hogs with both the .30 Remington AR and .300 AAC Blackout. However, since most feral hog hunting is performed at night, he did not like looking for proprietary brass cases after he had fired them and designed the 7.62×40mm around the inexpensive and readily available 5.56 NATO cartridge. (The 7.62×40mm WT is a cartridge designed by Kurt Buchert and brought to market by Wilson Combat. )

The 7.62×40mm WT is designed for both tactical and defense rifles and for hunting medium-sized game. In tactical applications, the 110 gr Barnes TTSX bullet can be used to penetrate tough barriers, while the soft-point and hollow-point bullets provide reliable terminal performance on soft tissue. In hunting applications, the 7.62×40mm WT delivers slightly more energy than the 7.62×39mm and is similar to the 6.8 SPC and .30-30 Winchester, making it useful for game such as deer and feral hogs, particularly for hunters who want to use an AR-15, but cannot legally use the 5.56 round, due to its low power factor on game.

Firearms writer Wayne Van Zwoll describes the round as being very accurate.

== Firearms chambered for 7.62×40mm WT ==
Since the 7.62×40mm WT is based upon the 5.56mm NATO, the only required modification to AR-15/M4 rifles currently chambered for 5.56mm NATO or .223 Remington is a new barrel. Wilson Combat offers barrels and complete upper receiver sets, with barrel lengths offered in 11.3", 16", 18", and 20". US Machine Gun Armory in Utah has begun offering a conversion kit for the Mk 46/M249 in 7.62 WT.

Because of Wilson's modification to the parent case, some capacity is lost in a standard AR-15 magazine. Wilson partnered with Lancer to produce a true 20-round magazine for the 7.62 X40 by removing the feed guide rib inside the magazine and sells the magazine as a "Lancer 1.5".

== Cartridge availability ==
Out of production, replaced by the 300 HAM'R Wilson Combat currently (2011) offers custom loaded 7.62×40mm WT ammunition with bullet weights of 110gr and 125gr, but the cartridge can also be hand-loaded using new brass available from Wilson Combat, or by using 5.56mm NATO - preferably Lake City - and the appropriate sizing/forming dies available from Lee Precision and Wilson Combat.

== See also ==
- List of rifle cartridges
- Glossary of firearms terminology
- .300 AAC Blackout
- 7×33mm Sako
