= 14.5mm JDJ =

Rifle cartridge

- Type: Rifle
- Place of origin: United States

Production history
- Manufacturer: SSK Industries

Specifications
- Parent case: .50 BMG
- Bullet diameter: .585 in (14.9 mm)

Ballistic performance
Bullet mass/type	Velocity	Energy
1,173 gr (76 g)	2,700 ft/s (823 m/s)	18,992 ft⋅lbf (25,750 J)

The 14.5mm JDJ is a rifle cartridge originally created by SSK Industries of Wintersville, Ohio. SSK Industries is now SSK Firearms and no longer appears to sell the cartridge.

== Overview ==
It uses the .50 BMG case with the neck opened up to accept a .585 in (14.9 mm) bullet. It fires the 1,173-grain (76.0 g) bullet at 2,700 ft/s (820 m/s) with the fire-formed load. The Barnes 750-grain (49 g) bullet can also be loaded to 3,000 ft/s (910 m/s). It has a destructive device exemption. Only rifles chambered for the .50 BMG can be converted to this caliber.
