= Boeing Model 306 =

Cancelled airplane model

Boeing 306

General information
- Type: Heavy bomber Flying boat Airliner
- National origin: United States of America
- Manufacturer: Boeing
- Designer: Boeing
- Status: Cancelled
- Number built: 0

History
- Introduction date: 1935

The Boeing Model 306 was the designation for a series of aircraft drafted in 1935 that achieved neither design nor production status. They included the Model 306 bomber, Model 306 flying boat, and Model 306A airliner.

== Design ==
In 1935, Boeing drafted several configurations of aircraft loosely based on both the Boeing XB-15 research and experience with the Boeing 314 Clipper aircraft. Each design was a "tailless" variation of those existing models with a flying wing layout, or a creative extension of the theme. They all featured extended trailing aileron/elevators that could perform their function without disrupting the wing performance. The wings were consistently swept about 35 degrees. The immaturity of the designs is evident in the flying boat drawings, which feature neither outrigger pontoons nor stabilising sponsons to keep the aircraft upright in the water. Each land based design featured tricycle landing gear as a feature when taildragger configurations were the standard of the time.

== Variants ==
Boeing Model 306 bomber
A heavy bomber with a family resemblance to the Boeing XB-15, to use Allison V-1710 engines.
Boeing Model 306 flying boat
A flying boat with a fuselage similar to the Boeing 314, to use Allison V-1710s.
Boeing Model 306A airliner
Airliner design, to use four Pratt & Whitney Hornet S1EG radials paired in a push-pull configuration.

== Specifications (Model 306) ==
General characteristics

- Crew: 10
- Length: 60 ft (18 m)
- Wingspan: 140 ft (43 m)
- Powerplant: 4 × Allison V-1710

Performance

- Range: 4,300 nmi (5,000 mi, 8,000 km)

Armament
