= .30-06 JDJ =

Rifle cartridge

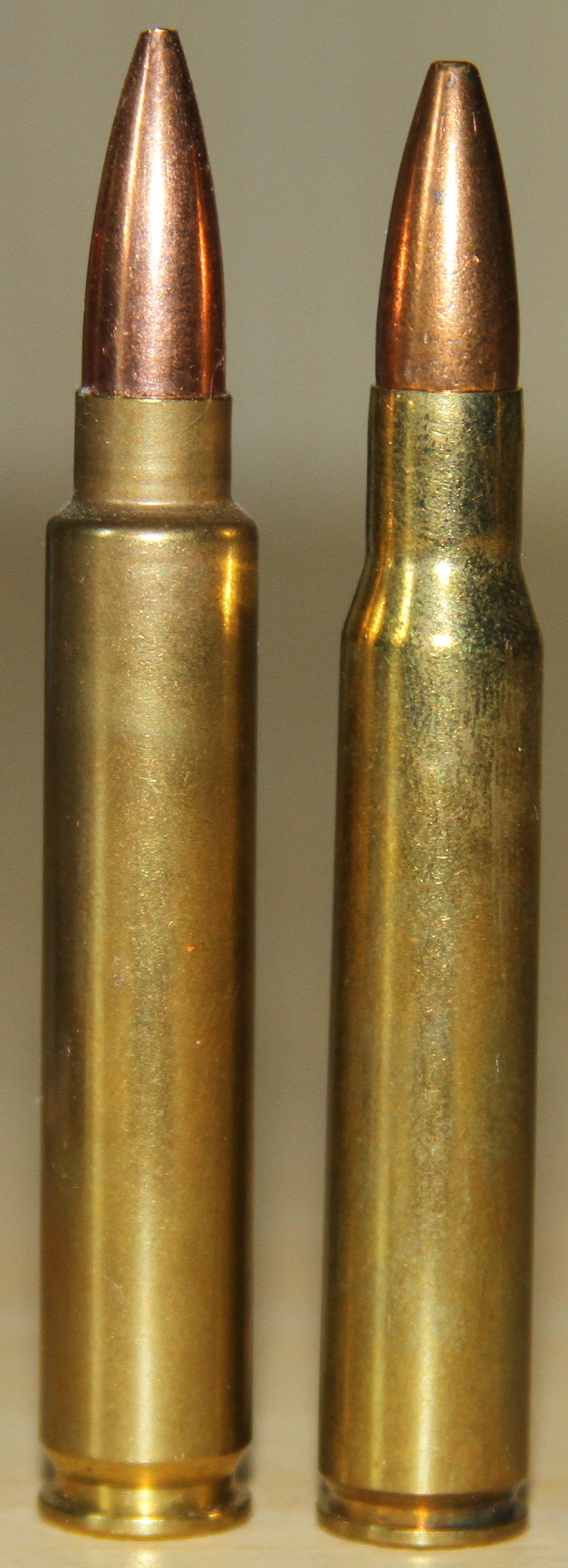
- .30-06 JDJ cartridge (left) next to its parent case, the .30-06 Springfield
- Type: Rifle
- Place of origin: United States

Production history
- Designer: J.D. Jones

Specifications
- Parent case: .30-06 Springfield
- Case type: Rimless, bottleneck
- Bullet diameter: .309 in (7.8 mm)
- Neck diameter: .335 in (8.5 mm)
- Shoulder diameter: .455 in (11.6 mm)
- Base diameter: .470 in (11.9 mm)
- Rim diameter: .457 in (11.6 mm)
- Rim thickness: .0433 in (1.10 mm)
- Case length: 2.457 in (62.4 mm)
- Overall length: 3.311 in (84.1 mm)
- Primer type: Small rifle
- Maximum pressure: 60,000 psi (410 MPa)

Ballistic performance
Bullet mass/type	Velocity	Energy
125 gr (8 g)	3,197 m/s (10,490 ft/s)	2,785 J (2,054 ft⋅lbf)
150 gr (10 g)	2,930 m/s (9,600 ft/s)	2,860 J (2,110 ft⋅lbf)
180 gr (12 g) Speer	2,666 m/s (8,750 ft/s)	2,840 J (2,090 ft⋅lbf)
200 gr (13 g) Speer	2,504 m/s (8,220 ft/s)	2,785 J (2,054 ft⋅lbf)
- Test barrel length: standard SSK-manufactured barrel Source: Cartridges of the World

The .30-06 JDJ is a firearm cartridge designed by J.D. Jones of SSK Industries.

== Overview ==
The .30-06 JDJ is an improved form of the .30-06 Springfield cartridge designed for use in the Thompson Center Arms Encore platform. The body taper of the parent cartridge has been almost entirely eliminated in the JDJ design. The shoulder has also been blown forward considerably, with the angle sharpened to 60 degrees. These design features, reminiscent of the earlier .30 Gibbs, greatly increase the powder capacity of the cartridge over its parent. As a result, a 15" Encore pistol chambered in the .30-06 JDJ can safely equal the performance of a 24" rifle in the .30-06 Springfield.

Quality Cartridge offers headstamped brass for the .30-06 JDJ, which can also be fireformed using standard .30-06 cases. SSK Industries currently offers Hornady Custom Dies for the chambering.
