= Bau-Bataillon 87 =

Auxiliary unit during World War II

Construction Battalion 87
- Bau-Bataillon 87
- Active: August 1939 - May 1945
- Country: Nazi Germany
- Part of: Wehrmacht

Bau-Bataillon 87 (Construction Battalion 87) was an auxiliary unit of the Wehrmacht (Nazi Germany) during World War II. The personnel were a German cadre and nationals of Central Asia (1., 2., 3. Turkestanische Kompanie). It was formed on August 26, 1939. On September 23, 1943, it was renamed Bau-Pionier-Bataillon 87 (Construction Engineering Battalion).

Bau-Bataillon 87 was active from 26 August 1939 until the end of the war in 1945.
