= Hunter 306 =

Sailboat class

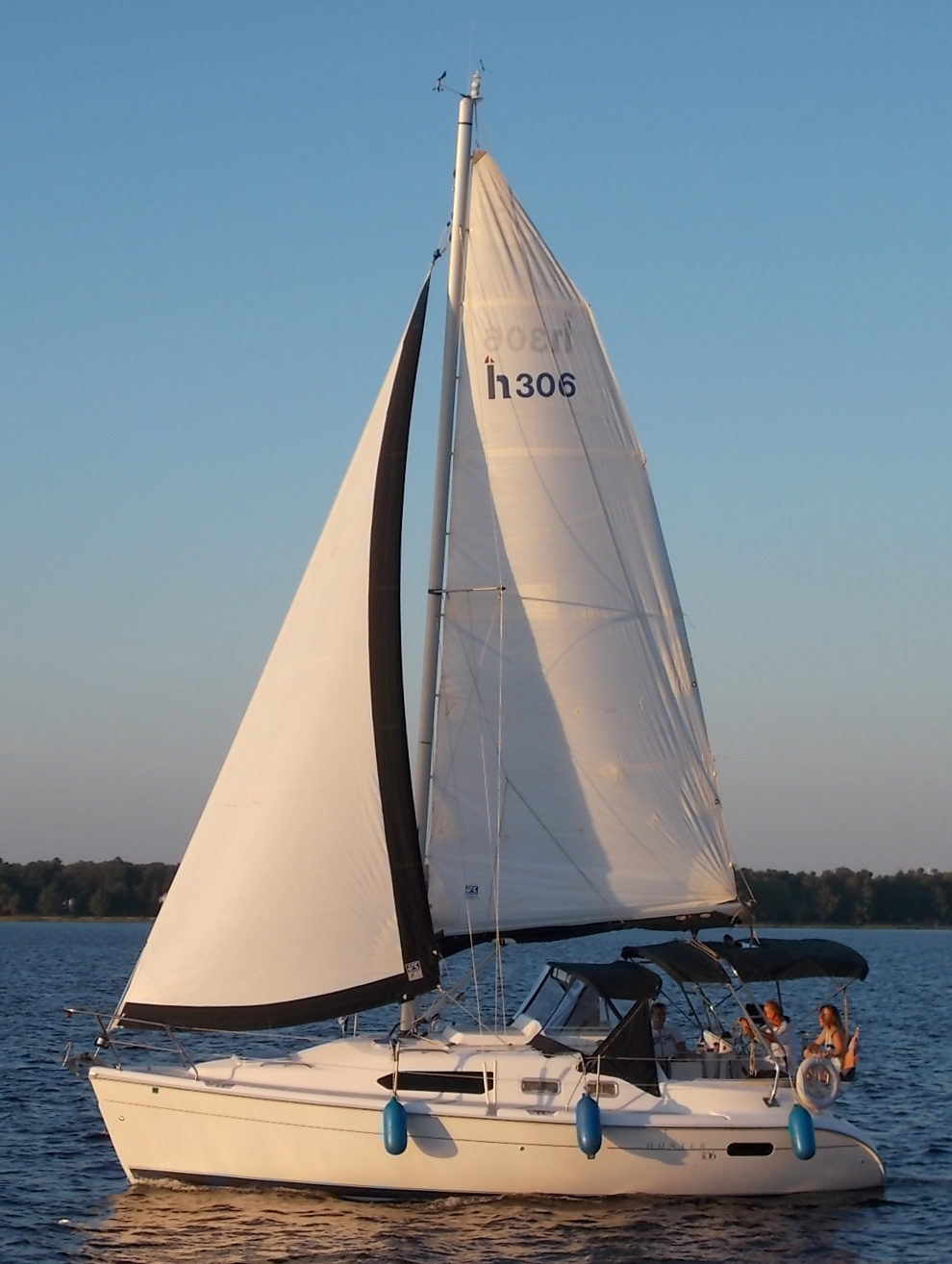

Development
- Location: United States
- Year: 2001
- Builder: Hunter Marine
- Name: Hunter 306

Boat
- Displacement: 7,150 lb (3,243 kg)
- Draft: 5.33 ft (1.62 m)

Hull
- Type: Monohull
- Construction: Fiberglass
- LOA: 29.92 ft (9.12 m)
- LWL: 26.92 ft (8.21 m)
- Beam: 10.75 ft (3.28 m)
- Engine: Yanmar diesel engine 18 hp (13 kW)

Hull appendages
- Keel: fin keel
- Ballast: 2,550 lb (1,157 kg)
- Rudder: internally-mounted spade-type rudder

Rig
- General: Fractional rigged sloop
- I foretriangle height: 32.00 ft (9.75 m)
- J foretriangle base: 11.00 ft (3.35 m)
- P mainsail luff: 29.08 ft (8.86 m)
- E mainsail foot: 12.00 ft (3.66 m)

Sails
- Mainsail area: 174.48 sq ft (16.210 m^{2})
- Jib/genoa area: 176.00 sq ft (16.351 m^{2})
- Total sail area: 350.48 sq ft (32.561 m^{2})

Racing
- PHRF: 186 (average)

The Hunter 306 is an American sailboat design, that was introduced in 2001.

The design forms a scaled series with the Hunter 326 and the 356.

== Production ==
The design was built by Hunter Marine in the United States, starting in 2001, but it is now out of production.

== Design ==
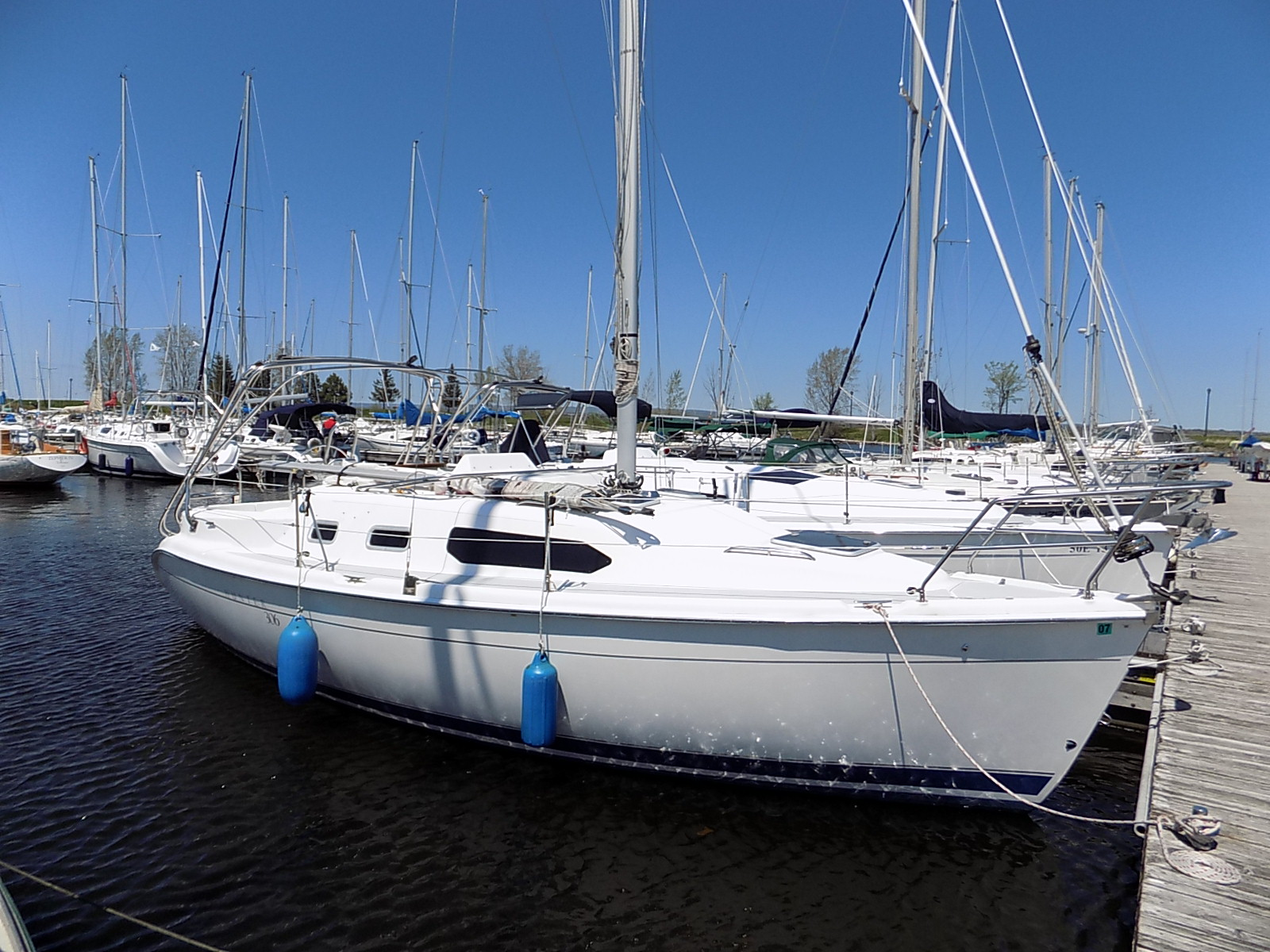
Hunter 306

The Hunter 306 is a recreational keelboat, built predominantly of fiberglass. It has a fractional sloop B&R rig, an internally-mounted spade-type rudder and a fixed fin keel. It displaces 7,150 lb (3,243 kg) and carries 2,550 lb (1,157 kg) of ballast.

The boat has a draft of 5.33 ft (1.62 m) with the standard wing keel and 3.83 ft (1.17 m) with the optional shoal draft keel.

The boat is fitted with a Japanese Yanmar diesel engine of 18 hp (13 kW). The fuel tank holds 20 U.S. gallons (76 L; 17 imp gal) and the fresh water tank has a capacity of 40 U.S. gallons (150 L; 33 imp gal).

The boat has a PHRF racing average handicap of 186 with a high of 207 and low of 168. It has a hull speed of 6.95 kn (12.87 km/h).

== See also ==
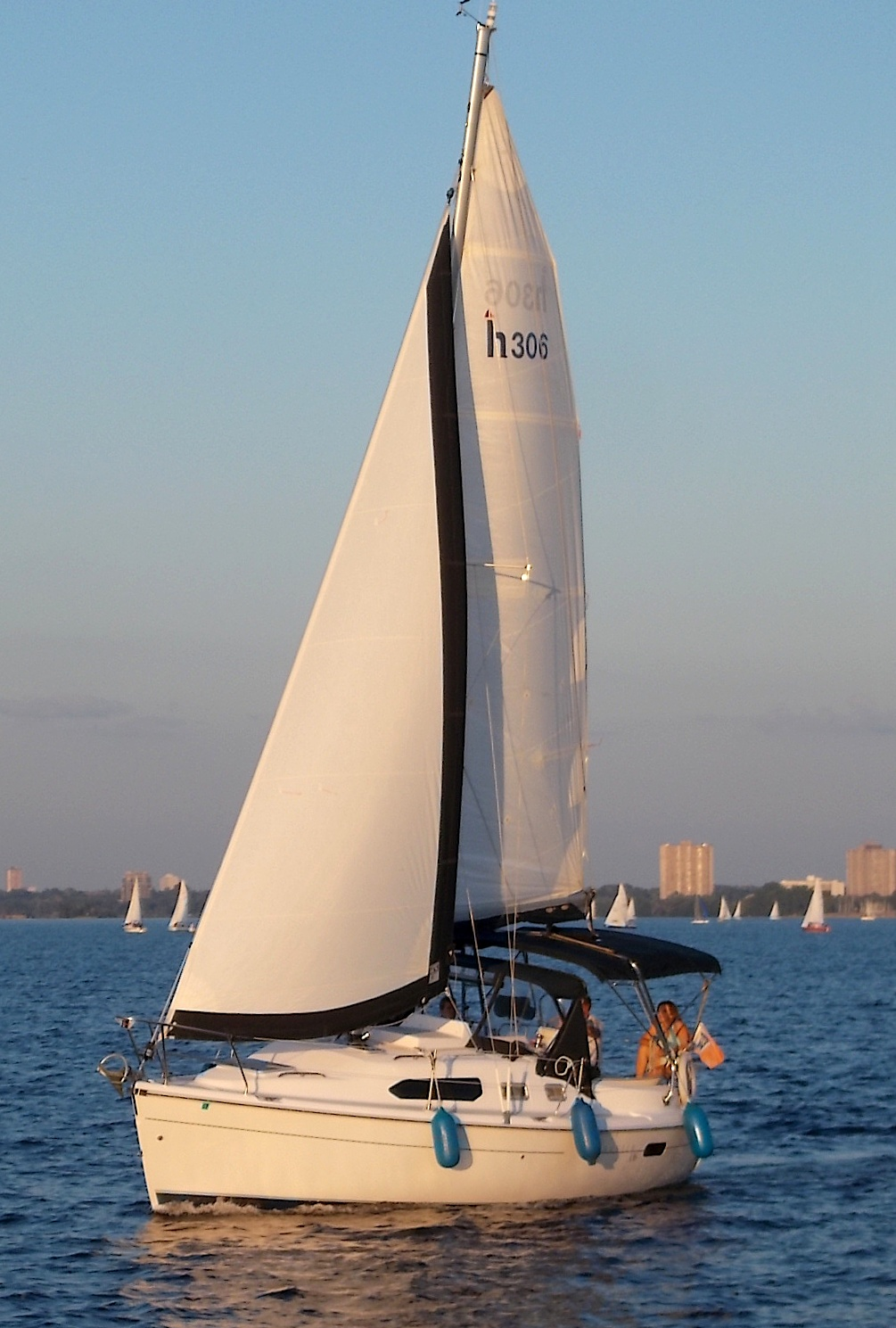
Hunter 306

- List of sailing boat types
