= Bau-Bataillon 121 =

Bau-Bataillon 121 (Construction Battalion 121) was an auxiliary unit of the Wehrmacht (Nazi Germany) during World War II. The personnel was Germans, nationals of Central Asia (4. Turkestanische Kompanie, 1943–1944), and Georgians (Georgische Kompanie, 1943–1944). It was formed on August 26, 1939. On September 23, 1943, it was renamed Bau-Pionier-Bataillon 121 (Construction Engineering Battalion).
