= .950 JDJ =

Large caliber rifle cartridge

- Type: Rifle
- Place of origin: United States

Production history
- Designer: J. D. Jones
- Manufacturer: SSK Industries/Knight Rifles

Specifications
- Parent case: 20×102mm Vulcan
- Bullet diameter: 0.950 in (24.1 mm)
- Case length: 2.75 in (70 mm)

Ballistic performance
Bullet mass/type	Velocity	Energy
3,600 gr (233 g)	2,200 ft/s (670 m/s)	38,685 ft⋅lbf (52,450 J)

The .950 JDJ (24.1×70mm) is an obsolete, powerful large caliber rifle cartridge developed by American gunsmith and weapon designer J. D. Jones of SSK Industries. It is considered to be the most powerful sporting rifle ever produced.

== Cartridge ==
.950 JDJ cases are approximately 70 mm in length, and are based on a 20×102mm Vulcan case shortened and necked up to accept the .950 in (24.1 mm) bullet. Projectiles are custom-made and most commonly weigh 3,600 grains (230 g) which is 8.2 ounces or over half a pound.

== Rifles ==
As its name implies, rifles chambered for the cartridge have a groove diameter of 0.950 in (24.1 mm). In the United States, SSK received a "Sporting Use Exception" from the ATF to de-regulate the rifle. Normally firearms with a rifled barrel having a bore size over 0.50 inches are strictly regulated as Destructive Devices by the National Firearms Act and Title II of the Gun Control Act of 1968, requiring ATF approval prior to purchase, manufacture, or transfer, which is granted only after passing an enhanced background check (which includes submitting a photo and fingerprint card) and paying a $200 tax, with the destructive device being registered to the person/entity it is transferred to. However, a firearm that would otherwise be required to be registered and regulated as a Destructive Device, can be granted a Sporting Use Exception if it is primarily designed for sporting use and the ATF determines it is unlikely to be used as a weapon. Thus, since the .950 JDJ was granted a sporting exception, it is regulated as a Title I rifle by the GCA and can be purchased and owned by any American citizen or lawful permanent resident who is at least 18, has filled out an ATF Form 4473 Firearm Transaction Record and passed a standard background check. However, the .950 JDJ is not legal in all states, some states like California, Illinois, Massachusetts and Washington D.C. specifically ban the .50 BMG as an "assault weapon", as well as all other rifles with a bore size over either .50 or .60 caliber (the exact threshold varies by state) and prohibit their sale or transfer to civilians, while other states like Delaware and Maryland only ban specific rifles like the Barrett .50 BMG and have restrictions on other large bore rifles requiring either a permit or registration; some cities and counties also ban them even if their state doesn't, one is advised to check local laws before purchasing any large bore rifle. The rifles use stocks and extraordinarily thick Krieger barrels bearing an 18 lb (8.2 kg) muzzle brake. Overall, depending on options, the rifles weigh from 85 to 120 pounds (39 to 54 kg) and are therefore only useful for shooting from a bench rest or heavy bipod. Despite the weight, recoil is significant and shooters must be sure to choose components (i.e., scopes and bipods) that can handle the force. The sheer size, weight, and power of these rifles make them rather impractical for hunting use. SSK only manufactured three of these rifles and as of 2014 no longer produces the ammunition.

== Ballistics ==
The cartridge propels its 3,600 grains (233 grams) bullet at approximately 2,200 feet per second (670 metres per second), it would take 45 .223 Remington bullets (80 grain) and 24 .308 Winchester bullets (150 grain) to equal the weight of a .950 JDJ bullet. This yields a muzzle energy of 38,685 foot-pounds force (52,450 joules).

By comparison, the 5.56×45mm NATO cartridge, used in the M16 and M4 rifles, produces between 1,200–1,300 foot-pounds force (1,600–1,800 joules), while the .308 Winchester, a favorite for hunters, police, and military snipers, produces between 2,000–3,000 foot-pounds force (2,700–4,100 joules) depending on the load used. Even the .50 BMG, which has a kinetic energy of around 13,000–15,000 foot-pounds force (18,000–20,000 joules) delivers less than half the energy. The ballistics of the .950 JDJ are more similar to that of the 20 mm autocannon round, which delivers approximately 39,500 foot-pounds force (53,600 joules). The muzzle energy of the .950 JDJ is comparable to the kinetic energy of a 2,800 pounds (1,300 kilograms) automobile traveling at 20 miles per hour (32 kilometres per hour).

In a 110 lb (50 kg) rifle, this will develop well over 200 foot-pounds force (270 joules) of free recoil energy. Shooting usually involves a heavy "lead sled" or similar shooting rest, and the rifle scope has significant eye relief to avoid injuring the ocular orbit.
