= USS LST-306 =

1942 LST-1-class tank landing ship

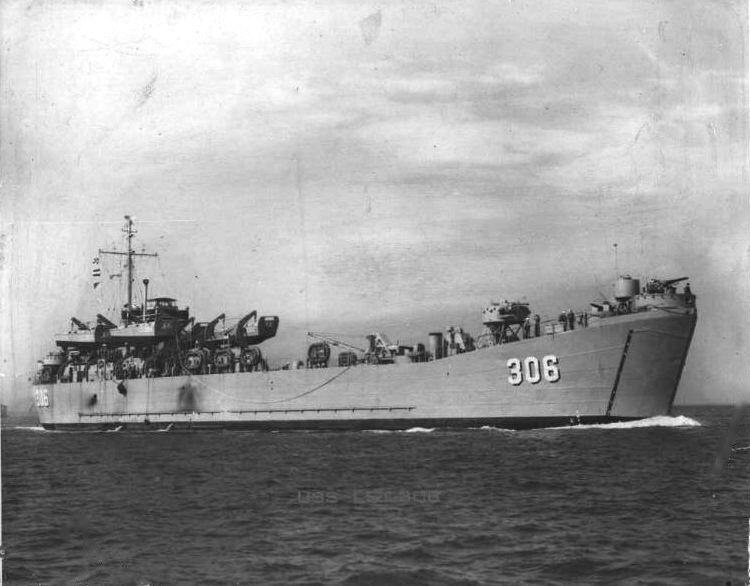
- USS LST-306

History

United States
- Name: USS LST-306
- Builder: Todd Shipyard Company, Boston Navy Yard
- Laid down: 24 July 1942
- Launched: 10 October 1942
- Commissioned: 11 December 1942
- Decommissioned: 13 June 1946
- Renamed: USS Bernalillo County (LST-306), 1 July 1955
- Namesake: Bernalillo County, New Mexico
- Stricken: 1 February 1959
- Honours and awards: 3 battle stars (WWII)
- Fate: Sold for scrapping 22 October 1959

General characteristics
- Class & type: LST-1-class tank landing ship
- Displacement: 1,625 long tons (1,651 t) light; 4,080 long tons (4,145 t) full
- Length: 328 ft (100 m)
- Beam: 50 ft (15 m)
- Draft: Unloaded: Bow: 2 ft 4 in (0.71 m); Stern: 7 ft 6 in (2.29 m); Loaded : Bow: 8 ft 2 in (2.49 m); Stern: 14 ft 1 in (4.29 m)
- Depth: 8 ft (2.4 m) forward, 14 ft 4 in (4.37 m) aft (full load)
- Propulsion: 2 General Motors 12-567 diesel engines, two shafts, twin rudders
- Speed: 12 knots (22 km/h; 14 mph)
- Boats & landing craft carried: Two or six LCVPs
- Troops: 14-16 officers, 131-147 enlisted men
- Complement: 7-9 officers, 104-120 enlisted men
- Armament: 2 × twin 40 mm gun mounts w/Mk.51 directors; 4 × single 40 mm gun mounts; 12 × single 20 mm gun mounts

USS Bernalillo County (LST-306) was an LST-1-class tank landing ship built for the United States Navy during World War II. Named for Bernalillo County, New Mexico, she was the only U.S. Naval vessel to bear the name.

LST-306 was laid down on 24 July 1942 at the Boston Navy Yard by the Todd Shipyard Company; launched on 10 October 1942; sponsored by Mrs. Caroline De Simone; and commissioned on 11 December 1942.

== Service history ==
=== Mediterranean, 1943 ===
After fitting out at Boston, LST-306 loaded supplies and ammunition before proceeding to the Chesapeake Bay for shakedown training. While there, her crew conducted beach maneuvers, practiced lowering small boats, and held communications and gunnery drills. She then took on supplies and cargo in Norfolk, Virginia before proceeding independently to Bermuda in March 1943. Underway in convoy for Europe later that month, she arrived at Arzeu, Algeria on 13 April. After joining a convoy carrying supplies to Bone, Algeria in support of the Tunisian campaign, the LST spent the next six weeks ferrying troops and equipment between Oran, Mers-El-Kebir, and Bizerte. In June, the tank landing ship lay in Tunis Bay, preparing for "Operation Husky," the planned landings on Sicily.

As part of Task Group (TG) 86.1 in the "Joss" Attack Force, LST-306 got underway on 7 July and arrived off Licata, Sicily early in the morning of 11 July. Assigned to reserve transport duty, she helped relieve port congestion by transferring supplies ashore at Gela and its environs until 17 August when she sailed to Bizerte. There she began preparations for "Operation Avalanche," the landings at Salerno. After loading British troops and equipment, LST-306 departed Tunis on 7 September and joined TG 85.1, the Northern Attack Force, for the voyage to Italy. After passing into the Gulf of Salerno, and avoiding several drifting mines, the tank landing ship anchored south of Salerno at 1215 on 9 September to await a clear beach lane. After LCI-323 pulled off the beach, LST-306 dropped her bow ramp at 1655 that afternoon. Under intermittent enemy shell fire, the tank landing ship disembarked 279 British soldiers and 57 vehicles before retracting to the anchorage at 1831. During the evening, enemy bombers attacked the beachhead twice, but no bombs fell near the LST.

The next morning, LST-306 took on British casualties for evacuation and departed the area. Joining a Bizerte-bound convoy, the tank landing ship moored in that port on the 12th. She then spent two months operating in the central Mediterranean area, ferrying supplies between North Africa and ports in Sicily and southern Italy. Ordered north at the end of November, the LST passed through the Strait of Gibraltar and sailed to England, arriving at Milford Haven on 17 December.

=== Invasion of France, 1944 ===
After unloading tank deck cargo, the LST moved to Falmouth for drydocking and a complete overhaul. After those repairs were completed on 10 January 1944 the tank landing ship began nearly five months of work in preparation for the cross-channel invasion of Europe. First, she engaged in three weeks of "Rhino ferry" (pontoon barge) practice landings in the Falmouth area. LST-306 continued this type of operation for the next four months, conducting various training maneuvers (such as troop landings, small boat exercises, antiaircraft gunnery practice, and communication drills) off the southwestern coast of England between Plymouth and Falmouth.

Assigned to convoy B-3 in Task Force (TF) 126.4, the LST embarked troops and equipment at Falmouth on 1 June. After a false start on the 4th, LST-306 got underway in convoy the next day with a pontoon causeway and a small tug in tow. While en route to France, the LST collided with a buoy, snapping off a blade from her port propeller. As the convoy's speed was already slow (5 knots), the damage did not prevent the tank landing ship from continuing her mission. Just after noon on 7 June, the tank landing ship cast off her tow at Utah Beach before proceeding to Omaha Beach where she anchored for the night. During this time, the ship's two LCVPs delivered medical supplies ashore. The next afternoon, the LST disembarked 218 Army engineers and unloaded mine-clearing equipment to LCTs for transfer to the beach. At 1917, the LST beached and, over the next eight hours, unloaded the remaining 115 troops and the rest of her cargo of 52 trucks. Pulling off the beach on the morning of 9 June, LST-306 proceeded to Southampton, England for repairs. She remained there, waiting for an availability, until 17 June when she moved to Plymouth for repairs. With a new propeller in place on the 22nd, the LST moved to Portland Harbour on 26 June, loaded Army trucks and personnel, and carried them to Utah Beach the next day. After dropping them off, she returned to Southampton with 900 German prisoners. Over the next ten months, LST-306 made dozens of shuttle trips across the Channel, carrying troops, ammunition, and supplies from England to the French ports of Rouen, Le Havre, and Cherbourg.

=== Return to the US, 1945 ===
On 11 May 1945 the LST joined one of the first convoys to head home after hostilities ended in Europe and arrived in Norfolk, Virginia on 31 May. After unloading her cargo, the tank landing ship proceeded to New York for major alterations in preparation for further combat duty in the Pacific. Entering a berth at Sullivan's Shipyard, Brooklyn on 11 June, LST-306 was in the yard when the crew heard the news of the end of the war on 15 August. Upon completion of the repair work on the 29th, the LST conducted a short shakedown cruise to Norfolk before returning to New York to load an LCT. Departing New York on 2 October, she sailed to Green Cove Springs on the St. Johns River in Florida, where she joined the Atlantic Reserve Fleet on 6 October 1945.

=== Decommissioning and sale, 1946–1959 ===
LST-306 was decommissioned there on 13 June 1946. Although named USS Bernalillo County (LST-306) on 1 July 1955 she never returned to active Navy service; her name was struck from the Naval Vessel Register on 1 February 1959. On 22 October 1959 the tank landing ship was sold to Ships, Inc., of Miami, Florida for scrapping.

LST-306 earned three battle stars for World War II

She was re-commissioned in 1951 during the Korean War and participated in practice landings with Marines while in the Atlantic Fleet. She also made visits to Venezuela, Curaçao, Cuba, Greenland, etc. in various exercises.
