= Lectionary 306 =

Lectionary ℓ 306
- New Testament manuscript
- Text: Evangelistarium †
- Date: 13th century
- Script: Greek
- Found: 1874
- Now at: Cambridge University Library
- Size: 16.5 cm by 13.5 cm
- Type: Byzantine text-type

Lectionary 306 (Gregory-Aland), designated by siglum ℓ 306 (in the Gregory-Aland numbering) is a Greek manuscript of the New Testament, on parchment. Palaeographically it has been assigned to the 13th century. The manuscript is lacunose.

== Description ==
The original codex contained lessons from the Gospels (Evangelistarium), on 136 parchment leaves, with some lacunae. The leaves are measured (16.5 cm by 13.5 cm). The first 54 other leaves were lost. The additional lessons about the season of Epiphany were inserted by other hand.

The text is written in Greek minuscule letters, in one column per page, 16-18 lines per page.

It contains music notes.

== History ==
Gregory and Scrivener dated the manuscript to the 13th century. It has been assigned by the Institute for New Testament Textual Research (INTF) to the 13th century.

It was bought from Quaritch for Cambridge University in 1874.

The manuscript was added to the list of New Testament manuscripts by Frederick Henry Ambrose Scrivener (292^{e}) and Caspar René Gregory (number 306^{e}). It was examined by Fenton John Anthony Hort. Gregory saw it in 1883.

The codex is housed at the Cambridge University Library (MS Add.1836) in Cambridge.

== See also ==
- List of New Testament lectionaries
- Biblical manuscript
- Textual criticism
- Lectionary 305

== Bibliography ==
- Gregory, Caspar René (1900). Textkritik des Neuen Testaments, Vol. 1. Leipzig: J.C. Hinrichs’sche Buchhandlung. p. 413.
