= NGC 306 =

Open star cluster in the constellation Tucana

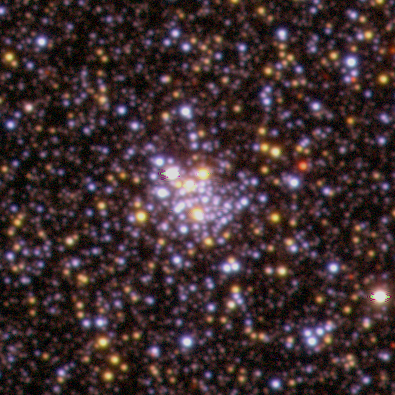
- NGC 306 with DECam

Observation data (J2000 epoch)
- Right ascension: 00^{h} 54^{m} 14.2^{s}
- Declination: −72° 14′ 32″
- Distance: ~200000 ly
- Apparent magnitude (V): 12.07
- Apparent dimensions (V): 1.1′ × 1.1′

Physical characteristics
- Mass: 1.9×10^{3} M_{☉}
- Estimated age: 59 Myr
- Other designations: ESO 029-SC 023.

Associations
- Constellation: Tucana

NGC 306 is an open cluster in the Small Magellanic Cloud. It is located in the constellation Tucana. It was discovered on October 4, 1836, by John Herschel.
