= J. D. Jones =

American ammunition designer

JD Jones
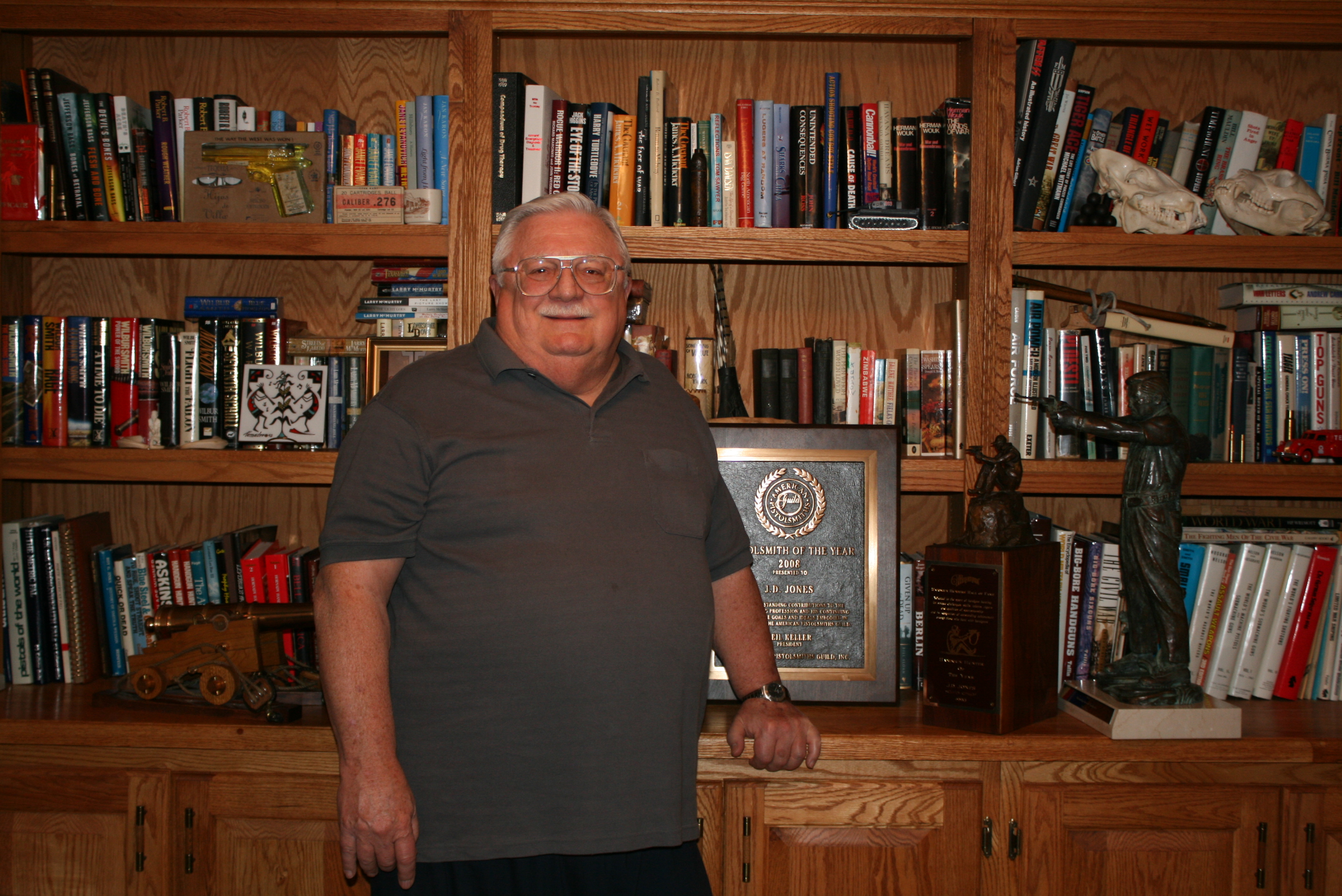
- Jones with awards given as Pistolsmith of the year; Handgun Hunters Hall of Fame, Outstanding American Handgunner
- Born: JD Jones; November 21, 1936 (age 89); Wintersville, Ohio, United States
- Occupations: Inventor, gunsmith, businessman

J. D. Jones (born November 21, 1936) is an American firearms and cartridge designer, firearms writer and founder of SSK Industries. Jones began hunting at an early age, and became interested in bullet casting and handloading firearms cartridges. In the 1960s, Jones collaborated with Lee Jurras to create the Super Vel line of high-performance handgun ammunition.

In 1977, Jones founded SSK Industries, a company focused on cartridges and barrels for high-power handguns for hunting and target shooting (such as the Thompson Center Arms Contender rifle-calibre pistol).

Also in the late 1970s, Jones founded Handgun Hunters International, an association of like-minded hunters who used handguns for their sport, and HHI's attendant newsletter, The Sixgunner.

Jones is primarily known for two lines of firearms cartridges. The first are the JDJ cartridges, primarily intended for the T/C Contender, ranging from .224 to .577 calibre. The second is the "Whisper" cartridge family, intended to cause maximum damage at subsonic speeds, making them nearly silent when used with a firearm suppressor. He is also known for creating the .950 JDJ, the world's largest rifle cartridge, alongside the rifle that fires the cartridge.

Jones is a member of the National Rifle Association of America and Safari Club International and has authored two columns for American Handgunner magazine.

== See also ==
- 14.5mm JDJ
- .30-06 JDJ
- .950 JDJ
