= Ost-Bau-Pionier-Bataillon 559 =

Auxiliary military unit of Nazi Germany

Ost-Bau-Pionier-Bataillon 559 (Eastern Construction Engineering Battalion 559) was an auxiliary unit of the Wehrmacht (Nazi Germany) during World War II.

It was formed on March 15 1943 in southern Ukraine as Straßen-Bau-Bataillon 559 (Road Construction Battalion 559) under the Army Group South. It was consecutively renamed to Ost-Bau-Bataillon 559, Ost-Bau-Bataillon des Befehlshaber Heeresgebiet "Süd", and to its final name on August 19. In 1944, it was moved to Upper Silesia under the command of the Army Group Center.
