= 7mm BR Remington =

Rifle cartridge

7 mm BR Remington
- Type: Rifle
- Place of origin: United States

Production history
- Designer: Mike Walker
- Designed: 1978
- Manufacturer: Remington
- Produced: 1978–1998

Specifications
- Parent case: 6mm BR Remington
- Case type: Rimless, Bottleneck
- Bullet diameter: 0.284 in (7.2 mm)
- Neck diameter: 0.315 in (8.0 mm)
- Shoulder diameter: .4598 in (11.68 mm)
- Base diameter: .473 in (12.0 mm)
- Case length: 1.520 in (38.6 mm)
- Primer type: small rifle
- Maximum CUP: 52,000 CUP

The 7mm BR Remington / 7.2x38mm, commonly called the 7mm BR or the 7mm Benchrest Remington in long form, was an intermediate cartridge developed by Remington for the Remington XP-100 single-shot bolt-action handgun. The cartridge was developed for the Unlimited Class in the sport of Metallic silhouette shooting. Later it was introduced in the Remington Model XB-40 single-shot bolt-action rifle, which was specifically designed for the benchrest shooting community.

The 7mm BR is based on previous Remington benchrest cartridges 6mm BR Remington and the .22 BR Remington cartridges. These cartridges in turn trace their origin to .308 Winchester via the .308×1.5-inch Barnes cartridge. The 7mm BR was designed by merely necking up the pre-existing 6mm BR Remington to accept a .28 caliber (7 mm) bullet. The cartridge is capable of developing 2,200 ft/s (670 m/s) with a 139 gr (9.0 g) bullet or 2,100 ft/s (640 m/s) with a 154 gr (10.0 g) bullet in a 15 in (380 mm) barrel.

As a hunting cartridge it is adequate for smaller deer species and ranges under 150 yd (140 m). With lighter bullets, this cartridge makes an excellent varmint or predator cartridge. The 7mm BR Remington, however, was conceived as a competitive handgun cartridge for Metallic Shooting. It has enough energy and momentum to knock down targets out to 200 yd (180 m) and has had some success in that particular shooting discipline. Later it was also adopted in Benchrest shooting by Remington who introduced the X-40 rifle in that chambering.

At one time Remington produced ammunition and cases for this cartridge. They continued to supply the 7mm BR Remington case through to the early 1990s. Today the cartridge is considered obsolete and no major ammunition manufacturers produce loaded ammunition and Remington no longer manufactures firearms chambered for this cartridge. In April 2020 Peterson's began producing properly headstamped brass. Some small specialty ammunition manufacturers produce ammunition for the cartridge.

== See also ==
- Table of handgun and rifle cartridges
