= Bau-Bataillon 306 =

Wehrmacht auxiliary unit

Bau-Bataillon 306 (Construction Battalion 306) was an auxiliary unit of the Wehrmacht (Nazi Germany) during World War II. The personnel was Germans and Volga Tatars (3., 4. Wolgatatarische Kompanie, 1943–1944). It was formed on August 26, 1939. On September 23, 1943, it was renamed Bau-Pionier-Bataillon 306 (Construction Engineering Battalion).
