= 7×33mm Sako =

Finnish firearm cartridge

- Type: Rifle
- Place of origin: Finland

Production history
- Designer: Sako
- Designed: 1942
- Manufacturer: Sako
- Produced: 1942–1960s

Specifications
- Parent case: 9×19mm Parabellum
- Case type: Rimless, bottlenecked
- Bullet diameter: 7.26 mm (0.286 in)
- Neck diameter: 7.9 mm (0.31 in)
- Shoulder diameter: 9.5 mm (0.37 in)
- Rim diameter: 10 mm (0.39 in)
- Rim thickness: 1.27 mm (0.050 in)
- Case length: 33.3 mm (1.31 in)
- Overall length: 44.4 mm (1.75 in)
- Rifling twist: 1 turn in 401.32 mm (15.800 in)
- Primer type: Small rifle
- Maximum pressure: 40,611 psi (280,000 kPa)

Ballistic performance
Bullet mass/type	Velocity	Energy
78 gr (5 g) JHP/FMJ	732 m/s (2,400 ft/s)	1,353 J (998 ft⋅lbf)
- Test barrel length: 24 in (610 mm); Source(s): Ammo Encyclopedia, 2nd Edition, Page 395, Michael Brussard

The 7×33mm Sako cartridge was created in Finland in 1942 as a small game cartridge for animals such as the Capercaillie and Black Grouse. It is based on a 9×19mm Parabellum case that has been lengthened and necked down to accept a 7.21 mm (0.284 in) bullet. The cartridge overall length is 44.30 mm (1.744 in), with a case length of 33.30 mm (1.311 in) and a base diameter of 10 mm (0.39 in). The bottleneck bends at 26.50 mm (1.043 in) (diameter 9.50 mm (0.374 in)) and straightens at 29.12 mm (1.146 in) (diameter 7.80 mm (0.307 in)). The Bertram company of Australia makes brass for it. Sako offers two loadings: a 78 gr (5.1 g) FMJ, and a 78 gr soft nose.

Rifles chambered in this caliber include the Sako Models L42 and L46.

== See also ==
- List of rifle cartridges
- 7 mm caliber
