= SSK Firearms =

American designer and manufacturer of firearms and accessories

- Industry: Arms industry
- Founded: 1977; 49 years ago
- Founder: J. D. Jones
- Products: Firearms, ammunition
- Website: https://www.sskfirearms.com

SSK Firearms is an American designer and manufacturer of firearms and accessories in Wintersville, Ohio. Founded in 1977, the company is known for its custom Contender and Encore barrels.

Started by hunter and gun enthusiast J. D. Jones, SSK Industries began by manufacturing and marketing specific products related to hunting handguns and ammunition. It has grown to a company that makes hundreds of different types of rounds.

Lehigh Defense acquired SSK Industries in 2019, re-branding it SSK Firearms.

== Notable products ==
SSK produced the largest center-fire rifle in history, the .950 JDJ. It is a .950 caliber which produces recoil equivalent to shooting ten .30-06 rifles at the same time. SSK manufactured three of these rifles, and no longer produces the ammunition.

The Whisper family of firearm cartridges were developed in the early 1990s as a line of accurate, multi-purpose cartridges using relatively heavy rifle bullets for a given caliber in subsonic loads. The intention was to create an extremely accurate cartridge family for military, police, competition and specialized hunting markets that could also be easily sound-suppressed. While initially a group of wildcat cartridges, many of them now have SAAMI and C.I.P. specifications.
