= List of firearm brands =

Marque	Stands for (named after)	Company	Country	Market	Other products	Handgun	Shotgun	Rifle
556 Tactica		Accurate Armory LLC	United States	Civilian	Amscor	Yes	Yes	Yes
Accles & Shelvoke		Accles & Shelvoke	United Kingdom	Civilian, military				
Accuracy International		Accuracy International	United Kingdom	Civilian, military				
ADC	Armi Dallera Custom	Armi Dallera Custom SRL	Italy	Civilian				
Adcor Defense		Adcor Defense	United States	Civilian, military				
Advanced Armament Corporation		Advanced Armament Corporation	United States	Civilian				
Aegis Malinnov		Aegis Malinnov	Malaysia	Civilian, law enforcement, military				
American Derringer		American Derringer	United States	Civilian				
Anderson Manufacturing		Anderson Manufacturing	United States	Civilian, law enforcement, military				
Anschütz		J. G. Anschütz GmbH & Co. KG	Germany	Civilian	Rimfire and centerfire rifles. Most used rifles in biathlon			
Arctiier		Arctiier Armstech	United States	Civilian, military				
ArmaLite		Strategic Armory Corps	United States	Civilian, military				
Armscor		Armscor	Philippines	Civilian				
Arms Tech Limited		Arms Tech Limited	United States	Civilian				
Armi Dallera Custom		Armi Dallera Custom	Italy	Civilian				
Arsenal		Arsenal, Inc	Bulgaria	Civilian, military	Air defense equipment, artillery, munitions, explosives, ED devices, industrial machinery			
ASAI AG		ASAI AG	Switzerland	Civilian				
AEK		Kovrov Mechanical Plant, Degtyaryov Plant	Russia / USSR	Combat				
A. Uberti		Beretta Holding	Italy	Civilian				
Baikal	Lake Baikal	Izhmekh	Russia	Civilian, combat	Medical equipment			
Barrett	Ronnie Barrett	Barrett Firearms Manufacturing	United States/Australia	Civilian, military	Ammunition, Suppressors, Outdoor products, Clothing			
Bb		Adams Arms	United States	Civilian, law enforcement, military				
BCM	Bravo Company Manufacturing	Bravo Company MFG, Inc.	United States	Civilian, military				
Benelli		Benelli Armi SpA	Italy	Military, Hunting, Civilian				
Beretta		Beretta	Italy	Military, Civilian				
Bergara	Bergara	BPI Outdoors	Spain/United States	Civilian				
Bersa		Bersa	Argentina	Civilian and military				
Blaser		Blaser Jagdwaffen GmbH	Germany	Civilian, law enforcement	Outdoor			
Bleiker	Heinrich Bleiker	Bleiker Precision Engineering AG	Switzerland	Civilian	Target rifles			
Boito		E.R. Amantino	Brazil	Civilian				
Bond Arms		Bond Arms	United States	Civilian				
Boss & Co.		Boss & Co.	United Kingdom	Civilian				
Browning	John Browning	Browning Arms Company	United States		Outdoor products			
B&T	Karl Brügger & Heinrich Thomet	B&T AG	Switzerland	Civilian, Military	Ammunition, suppressors, clothing			
BSA	Birmingham Small Arms	Birmingham Small Arms Company	United Kingdom	Civilian, Military	Accessories, ammunition, motorcycles, bicycles			
BUL Armory		BUL Armory	Israel	Civilian				
Bushmaster		Bushmaster Firearms International	United States					
Calico Light Weapons Systems		Calico Light Weapons Systems	United States	Civilian				
Cadex Defence		Cadex Inc	Canada	Civilian, law enforcement, military,				
Canik	Canik Mountains	Canik Arms	Turkey	Civilian, law enforcement, military, security		Yes	No	No
Century International Arms		Century International Arms	United States	Civilian				
C.G. Haenel		Merkel	Germany	Civilian, law enforcement, military,				
Charter Arms		Charter Arms	United States	Civilian				
Chiappa	Ezechiele Chiappa	Chiappa Firearms	Italy	Civilian				
Christensen Arms	Christensen Family		United States	Civilian, Law Enforcement, Military, Sport Shooting				
Colt	Samuel Colt	Colt's Manufacturing Company; Colt Defense	United States	Civilian, law enforcement, military, security				
Colt Canada	Samuel Colt/Canada	Colt CZ Group	Canada	Civilian, law enforcement, military, security				
Cosmi Americo & Figlio		Cosmi Americo & Figlio	Italy	Civilian				
CVA	Connecticut Valley Arms	BPI Outdoors	United States	Civilian				
CZ	Česká zbrojovka	Česká zbrojovka Uherský Brod	Czech Republic	Civilian, law enforcement, military,				
Daniel Defense	Marty Daniel	Daniel Defense	United States	Civilian, law enforcement, military, security	Suppressors, rails/handguards, accessories, ammunition, clothing			
Defense Distributed		Defense Distributed	United States	Civilian				
Davide Pedersoli & C.	Davide Pedersoli	Davide Pedersoli	Italy	Civilian, historical, black powder	Muzzleloading, breech loading, accessories,			
Defend ID		Indonesian state-owned defense corporation	Indonesia	Military				
Denel Land Systems		Denel	South Africa	Civilian, law enforcement, military				
Desert Tech		Desert Tech	United States	Civilian				
Detroit Gun Works		Detroit Gun Works	United States	Civilian, Law Enforcement, Military	Bolt Action Rifles	No	No	Yes
DPMS Panther Arms		DPMS Panther Arms	United States	Civilian				
FAMAE	Fábricas y Maestranzas del Ejército		Chile	Military, security				
FB "Łucznik" Radom		Polska Grupa Zbrojeniowa	Poland	Civilian, military				
FM	Fabricaciones Militares	Fabricaciones Militares	Argentina	Civilian, law enforcement, military, security				
Feinwerkbau		Feinwerkbau GmbH	Germany	Civilian	Target rifles			
Ferfrans		Ferfrans	United States	Civilian				
FN	Fabrique Nationale	FN Herstal	Belgium	Civilian, law enforcement, military, security	Airborne weapon pod systems, ammunition, vehicle mounted weapon systems			
Franchi		Benelli Armi	Italy	Civilian				
Freedom Arms	Freedom, Wyoming	Freedom Arms	United States	Civilian	Revolvers, single-shot handguns			
Gallyon Gun & Rifle Makers		Gallyon Gun & Rifle Makers	United Kingdom	Civilian				
Geissele Automatics	Bill Geissele	Geissele Automatics	United States	Civilian, law enforcement, military, security				
German Sport Guns GmbH		German Sport Guns GmbH	Germany	Civilian				
Girsan	Girsan Gun Industry	GIRSAN	Turkey					
Griffin & Howe		Griffin & Howe	United States	Civilian				
Grünig + Elmiger	Kurt Grünig & Heinz Elmiger	Grünig + Elmiger AG	Switzerland	Civilian	Target rifles			
Glock	Gaston Glock	Glock Ges.m.b.H.	Austria					
Government Arsenal		Philippine state-owned defense corporation	Philippines	Military				
Hämmerli		Umarex	Germany	Civilian				
Hartmann & Weiss		GmbH	Germany	Civilian				
Haenel	Carl Gottlieb Haenel	C. G. Haenel Waffen und Fahrradfabrik	Germany	Civilian, law enforcement, military				
H&R Arms	Nathan Harrington & William Augustus Richardson	Harrington and Richardson Arms Company	United States	Civilian, law enforcement, military				
H&K	Edmund Heckler & Theodor Koch	Heckler & Koch	Germany					
Hellenic Defence Systems		Greek state-owned defense corporation	Greece	Military				
Henry	Benjamin Tyler Henry	Henry Repeating Arms	United States	Civilian				
Heym		Heym	Germany	Civilian				
Hi-Point Firearms		Hi-Point Firearms	United States	Civilian	Handguns, carbines, accessories			
Horizon Firearms		Kaspar	United States	Civilian				
Holland & Holland			United Kingdom	Civilian				
Howa		Howa	Japan	Civilian, military				
HS		HS Produkt	Croatia	Civilian, law enforcement, military, security	Handguns, machine guns			
Indo-Russia Rifles		Advanced Weapons and Equipment India	India	Military				
Infinity Firearms		Strayer Voigt Inc	United States	Civilian	Handguns			
Ithaca	Ithaca, New York	Ithaca Acquisition, Inc	United States	Civilian				
IWI	Israel Weapon Industries	Israel Weapon Industries	Israel	Civilian, military				
IMBEL	Indústria de Material Bélico do Brasil	Brazilian War Material Industry	Brazil	Civilian, military	Various			
IZh (Note: The IZh motorcycles and automobiles are manufactured by Izhmash.)		Izhmekh	Russia / USSR	Civilian	Air guns			
JA Industries		JA Industries	United States	Civilian				
James Purdey & Sons		James Purdey & Sons	United Kingdom	Civilian				
Janz		GmbH	Germany	Civilian				
J. G. Anschütz		GmbH & Co. KG	Germany	Civilian				
John Dickson & Son		John Dickson & Son	United Kingdom	Civilian				
John Rigby & Company	John Rigby	lüke & ortmeier gruppe	Ireland	Civilian				
J. Roberts & Son		J. Roberts & Son	United Kingdom	Civilian				
Kahr		Kahr Arms	United States	Civilian, law enforcement	Handguns			
Kalashnikov Concern	Mikhail Kalashnikov	Rostec	Russia / USSR	Civilian, military & law enforcement				
Kalashnikov USA			United States	Civilian				
Kel-Tec	George Kellgren	Kel-Tec CNC Industries Inc.	United States					
Keppeler	Dieter Keppeler	KEPPELER Technische Entwicklungen GmbH	Germany	Civilian	Target rifles			
Kimber		Kimber Manufacturing	United States	Civilian, military & law enforcement	Handguns, rifles			
Knight’s Armament Company	C. Reed Knight Jr.	Knights Armament Company	United States	Civilian, law enforcement, military, security				
Korth		Korth	Germany	Civilian, law enforcement				
Krieghoff		Krieghoff	Germany	Civilian				
L'Atelier Verney-Carron		Verney-Carron	France	Civilian, law enforcement				
Lazzeroni	John Lazzeroni	Lazzeroni Arms Co.	United States	Civilian				
Les Baer		Les Baer	United States	Civilian				
Lewis Machine & Tool Company		Lewis Machine & Tool Company	United States	Civilian, military & law enforcement				
Lithgow Arms	Lithgow, New South Wales	Thales Australia	Australia	Civilian				
Ljutic Industries		Ljutic Industries	United States	Civilian				
Lobaev Arms		Lobaev Arms	Russia / USSR	Civilian				
Loppo		Loppo	Finland	Civilian				
Ludwig Schiwy		Ludwig Schiwy	Germany	Civilian				
Lynx Rifles		Pirkan ASE	Finland	Civilian				
LWRC International		LWRC International	United States	Civilian				
Magtech		Companhia Brasileira de Cartuchos	Brazil					
Magnum Research		Kahr Arms	United States	Civilian				
Marlin Firearms		Sturm, Ruger & Co.	United States	Civilian				
Manurhin	Manufacture de Machines du Haut-Rhin	Chapuis Armes	France	Civilian, law enforcement, military, security	Revolvers; formerly pistols			
Mauser	Wilhelm & Paul Mauser	Mauser Jagdwaffen GmbH	Germany	Civilian, law enforcement, military, security				
McMillan Firearms		Strategic Armory Corps	United States	Civilian				
McWhorter Rifles		McWhorter Custom Rifles, Inc	United States	Civilian				
Mecar		Nexter Systems	Belgium	Military				
Merkel		Caracal International	Germany	Civilian				
Milkor		Milkor	South Africa	Civilian, military				
Miroku Corp.		Miroku Corp.	Japan	Civilian				
Montana Rifle Company		Montana Rifle Company	United States	Civilian				
Morini		Morini	Switzerland	Civilian				
Mossberg		O.F. Mossberg & Sons	United States					
MP	Mechanical Plant	Izhmekh	Russia	Civilian, combat	Air guns, less-lethal weapons			
MTs	Model' TsKIBa; TsKIB's Model	TsKIB SOO, Tula Arms Plant	Russia / USSR	Civilian (Note: With few exceptions (MTs-116M) which were created for combat.)				
Musgrave	Ben Musgrave	Musgrave	South Africa	Civilian	Centrefire Target & Hunting rifles			
Nighthawk Custom		Nighthawk Custom	United States	Civilian				
North American Arms		North American Arms	United States	Civilian				
Norinco	North Industries Corporation	Chinese state-owned defense corporation	China	Military				
Noveske Rifleworks		Noveske Rifleworks	United States	Civilian				
ORSIS		ORSIS	Russia / USSR	Civilian				
OTs	Obrazets TsKIBa; TsKIB's Specimen	TsKIB SOO / KBP	Russia / USSR	Combat				
Özyurt Arms		Özyurt Arms	Turkey	Military				
Pakistan Ordnance Factories		Pakistani state-owned defense corporation	Pakistan	Military				
Panther Arms								
Phoenix Arms		Phoenix Arms	United States	Civilian				
PSA	Palmetto State Armory	Palmetto State Armory	United States	Civilian	Handguns, shotguns, rifles, ammunition, knives			
Pardini Arms		Pardini Arms	Italy	Civilian				
Patriot Ordnance Factory		POF-USA Patriot Ordnance Factory, Inc.	United States	Civilian, law enforcement, military, security	Gas-piston-operated weapon systems, firearm accessories, drop-in triggers, patriotic artwork, bolt carriers, bolts, upper receivers, barrel nut heatsinks, E^2 (E-Squared) barrels			
Perazzi		Czechoslovak Group	Italy	Civilian				
PGM Précision		PGM Précision	France	Civilian, law enforcement, military				
Pindad		Indonesian state-owned defense corporation	Indonesia	Military				
Proarms		Proarms Armory	Czech Republic	Civilian, law enforcement, military				
Productos Mendoza		Productos Mendoza	Mexico	Civilian, law enforcement				
Remington	Eliphalet Remington	Remington Arms	United States	Civilian, law enforcement, military				
Rieder + Lenz	Werner Rieder	Rieder + Lenz AG	Switzerland	Civilian				
RISE Armament		RISE Manufacturing, LLC	United States	Civilian, law enforcement				
Robinson Armament Co.		Robinson Armament Co.	United States	Civilian				
Rock River Arms		Rock River Arms	United States	Civilian				
Rößler	Walter Rößler	Rößler	Austria	Civilian, law enforcement, military	Rohrbaugh			
Röhm Gesellschaft		Umarex	Germany	Civilian				
Rossi	Amadeo Rossi	Rossi	Brazil	Civilian				
RPC Fort		Ukrainian state-owned defense corporation	Ukraine	Military				
Ruger	William B. Ruger	Sturm, Ruger & Co.	United States					
Santa Bárbara Sistemas		General Dynamics	Spain	Civilian, law enforcement, military				
Sarsılmaz	"Steady" in Turkish	Sarsılmaz Arms	Turkey	Civilian, law enforcement, military, security	Handguns, shotguns, machine guns, battle rifles			
Seekins Precision	Glen Seekins	Seekins Precision	United States	Civilian				
S&T Motiv		S&T Holdings Co Ltd	South Korea	Military				
S&W	Horace Smith and Daniel B. Wesson	Smith & Wesson	United States		Various (Note: Smith & Wesson markets gun accessories, handcuffs, safes, apparel, watches, collectibles, knives, tools, air guns, and myriad other products under its brand name, including cologne, handbags, and washing machines.)			
SAKO	Suojeluskuntain Ase- ja Konepaja Oy	SAKO Ltd	Finland	Civilian, law enforcement, military,				
Savage	Arthur Savage	Savage Arms	United States					
SCCY		SCCY Firearms	United States					
Schultz & Larsen	Hans Schultz	Schultz & Larsen	Denmark	Civilian, military				
Seraphim Armoury (SA)		Seraphim Armoury Inc.	Canada	Civilian, law enforcement, military, security	Optics			
Serbu Firearms		Serbu Firearms	United States	Civilian				
Shadow Systems		Shadow Systems LLC	United States	Civilian, law enforcement, military, security	Handguns			
Shiloh Rifle Manufacturing Company		Shiloh Rifle Manufacturing Company	United States	Civilian				
Show Low MFG	Show Low MFG	Show Low MFG LLC	United States	Civilian, law enforcement, military, security	Pistol Caliber Carbines			
SIG Sauer		SIG Sauer	Germany / USA	Civilian, law enforcement, military, security	Suppressors, optics, ammunition, clothing			
Sipahi	Ottoman soldier	Sipahi Hunting and Tactical Inc.	Turkey/USA	Civilian	Shotguns			
SME Ordnance		Malaysian state-owned defense corporation	Malaya	Military				
Smith Enterprise, Inc.		Smith Enterprise, Inc.	United States	Civilian				
Springfield (historical)	Springfield, Massachusetts armory location	Springfield Armory	United States					
Springfield (present)		Springfield Armory, Inc.	United States					
SR	Spetsial'naya Razrabotka; Special Development	TsNIITochMash, TsKIB SOO / KBP, Tula Arms Plant	Russia	Combat				
SSK Industries		Lehigh Defense	United States	Civilian				
SSS Defence		SSS Defence	India	Military				
Staccato		Staccato 2011 LLC	United States	Civilian, law enforcement, security				
Stag Arms		Stag Arms	United States	Civilian				
Standard Manufacturing		Standard Manufacturing	United States	Civilian				
Stevens Arms		Savage Arms	United States	Civilian				
Steyr	Steyr, Austria	Steyr Mannlicher	Austria	Civilian, Combat				
STI International	Strayer, Tripp International	Westwind Investors	United States	Civilian				
Strayer Voigt Inc		Strayer Voigt Inc	United States	Civilian				
Stoeger Industries	Stoeger Guns, New York, 1924	Benelli/Beretta Group	United States, Italy, Turkey	Civilian				
SWORD International	(Special Warfare Operations Research and Development)	SWORD International Inc.	United States	Civilian & Military	Tandem Barrel (Airdrop Solutions)			
Tanner Sportwaffen		Tanner Sportwaffen	Switzerland	Civilian				
Tanfoglio		Tanfoglio	Italy	Civilian				
Taurus		Taurus	Brazil	Civilian, military				
Tikka	Tikkakoski	Tikkakoski (company), SAKO	Finland	Civilian, military				
Tisaş Arms	Trabzon Silah Sanayi A.Ş.	Tisaş	Turkey	Civilian, military				
Thompson/Center Arms		Thompson/Center Arms	United States	Civilian				
TOZ		Tula Arms Plant	Russia / USSR	Civilian				
Troy Industries		Troy Industries	United States	Civilian, military				
Truvelo		Truvelo Armoury	South Africa	Military				
Ugartechea		Ugartechea	Spain	Civilian				
Union de Industrias Militares	Union of Military Industries	Cuban state-owned defense corporation	Cuba	Civilian, military				
United Defense Manufacturing Corporation		United Defense Manufacturing Corporation	Philippines	Civilian, law enforcement, military				
Uronen Precision		Uronen Precision	Finland					
U.S. Ordnance		U.S. Ordnance	United States	Civilian				
UWS		Unified Weapons Systems	United States	Military, law enforcement				
Voere		Voere	Austria	Civilian				
Walther Arms	Carl Walther	Carl Walther GmbH Sportwaffen	Germany					
Weatherby	Roy Weatherby	Weatherby	United States	Civilian				
Webley & Scott		Webley & Scott	United Kingdom	Civilian				
Weihrauch		Weihrauch	Germany	Civilian				
Westley Richards		Westley Richards	United Kingdom	Civilian				
Wilson Combat	Bill Wilson	Wilson Combat	United States	Civilian, Military, Law Enforcement				
Winchester	Oliver Winchester	FN Herstal / Olin Corporation (Note: FN Herstal owns the U.S. Repeating Arms Company, the successor to the long-defunct Winchester Repeating Arms Company. The Winchester trademark, however, is owned by Olin, which licenses both FN Herstal and Browning to build Winchester-branded firearms.)	United States; Belgium					
W. W. Greener		W. W. Greener	United Kingdom	Civilian				
XADS		XADS	United States	Civilian				
Zastava Arms	Zastava Oružje	Zastava Arms	Serbia					
Zakłady Mechaniczne Tarnów		Polska Grupa Zbrojeniowa	Poland	Civilian, military				
Zbroyar		Zbroyar	Ukraine	Civilian, military				
Zbrojovka Brno	Brno	Colt CZ Group	Czech Republic	Civilian, military				
XCalibur/Grand Power USA		XCalibur	Sarasota, Florida	Civilian				
Zenith Firearms		Zenith Firearms	United States	Civilian, Military, Law Enforcement	Firearms, Parts, Accessories			
Ziegenhahn & Sohn		Ziegenhahn & Sohn	Germany	Civilian				

== See also ==
- List of firearms
- List of modern armament manufacturers
