= List of modern armament manufacturers =

Major companies produce weapons and munitions for military, paramilitary, government agency and civilian use. The companies are listed by their full name followed by the short form, or common acronym, if any, in parentheses. The country the company is based in, if the information is available, follows that.

Country	Company
Algeria	Établissement de Constructions et de Réparation Navale (ECRN)
Argentina	Bersa
Argentina	Fabricaciones Militares
Argentina	Fábrica Argentina de Aviones
Argentina	Río Santiago Shipyard
Australia	ASC
Australia	Austal
Australia	BSC Marine Group
Australia	DMS Maritime
Australia	Forgacs Marine & Defence
Australia	Metal Storm
Australia	NIOA
Australia	NQEA
Austria	Diamond Aircraft Industries
Austria	Glock Ges.m.b.H.
Austria	Rößler (also known as Roessler Waffen GmbH)
Austria	Steyr Arms
Azerbaijan	Ministry of Defence Industry of Azerbaijan
Bangladesh	Bangladesh Ordnance Factories
Bangladesh	Bangladesh Machine Tools Factory
Bangladesh	Dockyard and Engineering Works
Bangladesh	Khulna Shipyard
Bangladesh	Chittagong Dry Dock
Belgium	Forges de Zeebrugge
Belgium	Herstal Group
Belgium	John Cockerill
Bolivia	Fabrica Boliviana de Munición (FBM)
Brazil	Rio de Janeiro Navy Arsenal
Brazil	Avibras
Brazil	Companhia Brasileira de Cartuchos
Brazil	Embraer
Brazil	EMGEPRON
Brazil	Indústria Naval do Ceará
Brazil	IMBEL
Brazil	SIATT
Brazil	Taurus
Bulgaria	Arsenal Corporation
Bulgaria	TEREM
Bulgaria	VMZ Sopot
Canada	ABCO Industries
Canada	A. F. Theriault Shipyard
Canada	Bombardier Inc.
Canada	Cadex Defence
Canada	Cascade Aerospace
Canada	Davie Shipbuilding
Canada	INKAS
Canada	Irving Shipbuilding
Canada	Magellan Aerospace Corporation
Canada	MetalCraft Marine
Canada	Ontario Drive and Gear Ltd. (trading as ARGO)
Canada	Seaspan Marine Corporation
Canada	Viking Air
Chile	ASMAR
Chile	ENAER
Chile	FAMAE
China	Aviation Industry Corporation of China
China	China Aerospace Science and Industry Corporation
China	China Aerospace Science and Technology Corporation
China	China Electronics Technology Group
China	Norinco
China	China South Industries Group
China	China State Shipbuilding Corporation
China	Poly Technologies
China	Weichai Group
Colombia	COTECMAR
Colombia	Corporación de la Industria Aeronáutica Colombiana S.A. (CIAC)
Colombia	Indumil
Colombia	ISBI ARMORing Inc. (ISBI)
Croatia	Brodosplit d.d.
Croatia	Đuro Đaković
Croatia	HS Produkt
Croatia	Marina Punat
Cuba	Union de Industrias Militares
Czech Republic	Aero Vodochody
Czech Republic	Colt CZ Group
Czech Republic	Czechoslovak Group
Czech Republic	Zlin Aviation
Denmark	Faaborg Shipyard
Denmark	Karstensens Skibsværft A/S
Denmark	Terma A/S
Ecuador	Dirección de la Industria Aeronáutica Ecuador
Egypt	Alexandria Shipyard
Egypt	Arab Organization for Industrialization
Estonia	Baltic Workboats
Ethiopia	Metals and Engineering Corporation
Finland	Marine Alutech (trading as Watercat)
Finland	Patria
Finland	Pirkan ASE
Finland	Rauma Marine Constructions
Finland	SAKO
Finland	Uki Workboat
France	Centigon Security Group
France	Chapuis Armes
France	Constructions industrielles de la Méditerranée
France	Daher
France	Dassault Group
France	KNDS France
France	MBDA
France	Naval Group
France	PGM Precision
France	PIRIOU
France	Renault Trucks
France	Safran S.A.
France	Socarenam
France	Thales Group
France	Verney-Carron
Germany	Abeking & Rasmussen
Germany	Blaser
Germany	Carl Walther GmbH
Germany	Diehl Aerospace
Germany	Diehl Defence
Germany	Fassmer
Germany	Flensburger Fahrzeugbau
Germany	Lürssen
Germany	Hartmann & Weiss
Germany	Heckler & Koch
Germany	Heym AG
Germany	Hensoldt AG
Germany	Howaldtswerke-Deutsche Werft
Germany	Krieghoff
Germany	J. G. Anschütz
Germany	KNDS Deutschland
Germany	Mauser Jagdwaffen GmbH
Germany	PTW KORTH Technologies GmbH (Korth)
Germany	Rheinmetall AG (Rheinmetall)
Germany	ThyssenKrupp
Germany	Ziegenhahn & Sohn
Georgia	STC Delta
Greece	BSK Defense
Greece	Hellenic Aerospace Industry
Greece	Hellenic Defence Systems (trading as EAS)
Greece	Hellenic Vehicle Industry
Greece	Motomarine S.A. (Motomarine)
Greece	Ordtech Military Industries (OMI)
India	Advanced Weapons and Equipment India successor of Ordnance Factory Board (OFB)
India	Adani Defence and Aerospace
India	Ashok Leyland Defence Systems
India	Armoured Vehicles Nigam successor of Ordnance Factory Board (OFB)
India	BEML
India	Bharat Dynamics
India	Bharat Electronics
India	BrahMos Aerospace
India	Cochin Shipyard
India	Garden Reach Shipbuilders & Engineers
India	Gliders India successor of Ordnance Factory Board (OFB)
India	Goa Shipyard
India	Hindustan Aeronautics
India	Hindustan Shipyard
India	India Optel successor of Ordnance Factory Board (OFB)
India	Kalyani Group
India	Larsen & Toubro
India	Mahindra Group
India	Mazagon Dock Shipbuilders
India	Mishra Dhatu Nigam
India	MKU
India	Munitions India successor of Ordnance Factory Board (OFB)
India	Samtel Avionics
India	SSS Defence
India	Tata Advanced Systems
India	Troop Comforts successor of Ordnance Factory Board (OFB)
India	Yantra India successor of Ordnance Factory Board (OFB)
Indonesia	Indonesian Aerospace
Indonesia	North Sea Boats (trading name as PT Lundin Industry Invest)
Indonesia	PT PAL Indonesia
Indonesia	PT Palindo Marine
Indonesia	PT Pindad
Iran	Aerospace Industries Organization (AIO)
Iran	Defense Industries Organization (DIO)
Iran	Iran Aviation Industries Organization (IAIO)
Iran	Iran Electronics Industries (IEI)
Iran	Iran Marine Industrial Company (SADRA)
Iran	Iran Shipbuilding & Offshore Industries Complex Co (ISOICO)
Iran	Marine Industries Organization (MIO)
Iran	Qods Aviation Industry Company (QAIC)
Israel	Automotive Industries
Israel	BUL Armory
Israel	Carmor
Israel	Elbit Systems
Israel	Emtan Karmiel
Israel	Israel Aerospace Industries
Israel	Israel Shipyards
Israel	Israel Weapon Industries
Israel	mPrest Systems
Israel	Plasan
Israel	RADA Electronic Industries
Israel	Rafael Advanced Defense Systems
Israel	UVision Air
Israel	Zibar
Italy	Armi Jager (trading as Nuova Jager)
Italy	Perazzi
Italy	Baglietto Navy
Italy	BCM Europearms s.a.s.
Italy	Benelli Armi
Italy	Beretta
Italy	Breda Meccanica Bresciana (trading as Breda)
Italy	Chiappa Firearms
Italy	Tecnam
Italy	DRASS
Italy	FAMARS
Italy	FB Design
Italy	Fincantieri
Italy	Fiocchi Munizioni
Italy	Franchi
Italy	Intermarine
Italy	Iveco
Italy	Leonardo
Italy	Piaggio Aerospace
Italy	Vittoria Shipyard
Italy	Vulcanair
Japan	Asahi-Seiki Manufacturing Co., Ltd
Japan	Daikin
Japan	Hitachi
Japan	Hongawara Ship Yard Co., Ltd
Japan	Howa
Japan	IHI Corporation
Japan	Ishikawa Seisakusho, Ltd
Japan	Japan Steel Works
Japan	JFE Holdings
Japan	Kawasaki Heavy Industries
Japan	Komatsu
Japan	MinebeaMitsumi
Japan	Mitsubishi Group
Japan	Mitsui E&S
Japan	Sasebo Heavy Industries
Japan	Setouchi Craft Co., Ltd
Japan	ShinMaywa
Japan	Subaru Corporation
Japan	Sumidagawa Shipyard Co., Ltd (SSY)
Japan	Sumitomo Heavy Industries
Japan	Toshiba Corporation
Japan	Yamaha Motor Company
Jordan	Jordan Design and Development Bureau
Kazakhstan	Kazakhstan Engineering
Kenya	Kenya Ordnance Factories Corporation
Latvia	Dartz
Latvia	JSC Riga Shipyard
Libya	Black horse
Libya	Military Industry Authority (Libya)
Libya	ARDO
Lithuania	JSC LiTak-Tak
Luxembourg	Beretta Holding (Multinational)
Malaysia	DefTech
Malaysia	Destini Berhad
Malaysia	Gading Marine
Malaysia	LUNAS
Malaysia	Mildef International Technologies
Malaysia	SME Ordnance
Malaysia	Weststar Defence Industries
Mexico	Aguila Ammunition (trading name as TECNOS)
Mexico	Productos Mendoza
Myanmar	Myanmar Directorate of Defence Industries
Netherlands	Airbus (Multinational)
Netherlands	Damen Group
Netherlands	Defenture
Netherlands	Destinus
Netherlands	KMW+Nexter Defense Systems (Multinational)
Nigeria	Defence Industries Corporation of Nigeria
Norway	Kongsberg Gruppen
Norway	Nammo AS
Norway	Umoe Mandal
Pakistan	Global Industrial Defence Solutions (GIDS)
Pakistan	Heavy Industries Taxila (HIT)
Pakistan	Integrated Dynamics
Pakistan	Karachi Shipyard & Engineering Works (KS&EW)
Pakistan	National Engineering and Scientific Commission (NESCOM)
Pakistan	National Radio & Telecommunication Corporation (NRTC)
Pakistan	Pakistan Aeronautical Complex (PAC)
Pakistan	Pakistan Ordnance Factories (POF)
Peru	Servicios Industriales de la Marina S.A. (SIMA Peru S.A.)
Philippines	Armscor
Philippines	Government Arsenal
Philippines	Ferfrans
Philippines	Philippine Aerospace Development Corporation
Philippines	United Defense Manufacturing Corporation
Poland	AMZ-Kutno
Poland	Polish Armaments Group (PGZ)
Poland	Polish Defence Holding (PHO)
Portugal	Tekever Group (TEKEVER)
Portugal	West Sea
Romania	Aerostar
Romania	Avioane Craiova
Romania	Industria Aeronautică Română
Romania	ROMARM
Russia	Almaz-Antey
Russia	Aviaconversiya
Russia	Barnaul Cartridge Plant
Russia	Bryansk Automobile Plant
Russia	Concern Morinformsystem-Agat
Russia	Concern Radio-Electronic Technologies (KRET)
Russia	Energia
Russia	Financial and Industrial Group High-speed ships (FIG High-speed ships)
Russia	GAZ Group
Russia	High Precision Systems
Russia	Kalashnikov Concern
Russia	Kamaz
Russia	KBP Instrument Design Bureau
Russia	Klimovsk Specialized Ammunition Plant
Russia	Lavochkin
Russia	Lobaev Arms
Russia	Makeyev Rocket Design Bureau
Russia	Military Industrial Company
Russia	Motovilikha Plants
Russia	ORSIS
Russia	Open JSC Pella (Pella)
Russia	Progress Rocket Space Centre
Russia	Roscosmos
Russia	RTI Systems
Russia	Ruselectronics
Russia	Russian Helicopters
Russia	Shvabe Holding
Russia	Sozvezdie
Russia	Tactical Missiles Corporation
Russia	Tecmash
Russia	United Aircraft Corporation
Russia	United Shipbuilding Corporation
Russia	UralAZ
Russia	Uralvagonzavod
Russia	Vega Radio Engineering Corporation
Russia	Zelenodolsk Shipyard
Saudi Arabia	Saudi Arabian Military Industries
Serbia	Yugoimport SDPR
Serbia	Krušik
Serbia	PPT Namenska
Serbia	Prvi Partizan
Serbia	Sloboda Čačak
Serbia	EDePro
Serbia	Zastava Arms
Singapore	ST Engineering
Slovakia	Grand Power s.r.o.
Slovenia	Ravne Systems Armas
South Africa	DCD Group
South Africa	Denel
South Africa	Milkor (Pty) Ltd (Milkor)
South Africa	Paramount Group
South Africa	Rippel Effect (Pty) Ltd. (Rippel Effect)
South Africa	Truvelo Armoury
South Korea	Hanwha Group (Hanwha)
South Korea	Hyundai Heavy Industries
South Korea	Hyundai Rotem
South Korea	Hyundai WIA
South Korea	Kia Motors
South Korea	Korea Aerospace Industries (KAI)
South Korea	LIG Nex1
South Korea	LS Mtron
South Korea	Poongsan Corporation
South Korea	Samyang Comtech
South Korea	Satrec Initiative
South Korea	SNT Dynamics
South Korea	SNT Motiv
Spain	Astilleros Gondán
Spain	Dikar S. Coop.
Spain	Expal
Spain	Indra Sistemas
Spain	Instalaza
Spain	Navantia
Spain	Rodman Group
Spain	SENER
Spain	Armas Ugartechea
Sri Lanka	Colombo Dockyard
Sudan	Military Industry Corporation (MIC Sudan)
Sweden	BAE Systems AB
Sweden	Bromma Air Maintenance AB
Sweden	Saab AB
Sweden	Swede Ship Marine AB
Switzerland	B&T
Switzerland	Pilatus Aircraft
Switzerland	RUAG Holding Ltd (RUAG)
Switzerland	Swiss Arms (US subsidiary known as SIG Sauer)
Taiwan	Aerospace Industrial Development Corporation
Taiwan	CSBC Corporation
Taiwan	DronesVision
Taiwan	Jong Shyn Shipbuilding Company
Taiwan	Lungteh Shipbuilding
Taiwan	National Chung-Shan Institute of Science and Technology
Taiwan	Thunder Tiger
Thailand	Bangkok Dock
Thailand	Chaiseri
Thailand	NARAC Arms Company Limited
Thailand	Panus Assembly
Thailand	Thai Aviation Industry
Turkey	Ares Shipyard
Turkey	ASFAT Inc.
Turkey	ASELSAN
Turkey	Baykar
Turkey	BMC
Turkey	Canik Arms
Turkey	GİRSAN
Turkey	HAVELSAN
Turkey	Koç Holding
Turkey	Mechanical and Chemical Industry Corporation (MKEK)
Turkey	Nurol Holding (FNSS Defence Systems)
Turkey	Özyurt Arms
Turkey	ROKETSAN
Turkey	Sarsılmaz Arms
Turkey	TİSAŞ
Turkey	Turkish Aerospace Industries
Ukraine	Fire Point
Ukraine	Kuznya na Rybalskomu
Ukraine	LATEK LLC (ТОВ Латек)
Ukraine	NPO Practika
Ukraine	RPC Fort
Ukraine	Ukroboronprom
Ukraine	XADO Chemical Group (trading as Snipex)
Ukraine	PA Pivdenmash
Ukraine	Zbroyar Ltd.
United Arab Emirates	EDGE Group
United Arab Emirates	STREIT Group
United Kingdom	Accuracy International
United Kingdom	Babcock International
United Kingdom	BAE Systems
United Kingdom	Britten-Norman
United Kingdom	Chemring Group
United Kingdom	Eley Brothers
United Kingdom	Ferguson Marine
United Kingdom	Griffon Hoverwork
United Kingdom	James Fisher & Sons
United Kingdom	James Purdey and Sons
United Kingdom	Marshall Aerospace and Defence Group
United Kingdom	MGI Engineering
United Kingdom	Supacat
United Kingdom	W. W. Greener
United Kingdom	Webley & Scott
United Kingdom	Westley Richards
United States	AeroVironment
United States	American Derringer
United States	AM General
United States	ArmaLite
United States	Axon
United States	BAE Systems Inc.
United States	Barrett Firearms Manufacturing
United States	Black Hills Ammunition
United States	Boeing Defense, Space & Security
United States	Bollinger Shipyards
United States	Bond Arms
United States	Brunswick Boat Group
United States	Bushmaster Firearms International
United States	Calico Light Weapons Systems
United States	Charter Arms
United States	CheyTac
United States	Colt's Manufacturing Company
United States	Combined Systems, Inc.
United States	Cooper Firearms
United States	Day & Zimmermann
United States	Daniel Defense
United States	Dead Air Silencers
United States	Derecktor Shipyards
United States	Desert Tech
United States	Freedom Arms
United States	General Atomics
United States	General Dynamics
United States	Gladding-Hearn Shipbuilding
United States	GM Defense
United States	Metal Shark Boats
United States	Harris Gunworks
United States	Henry Repeating Arms
United States	Hi-Point Firearms
United States	Hodgdon Yachts
United States	Honeywell
United States	Hornady Manufacturing Company
United States	Huntington Ingalls Industries
United States	Ithaca Gun Company
United States	Kahr Arms
United States	Kaman Aerospace
United States	Kel-Tec
United States	Kimber Manufacturing
United States	Knight's Armament Company
United States	KRISS USA
United States	L3Harris Technologies
United States	Lehigh Defense
United States	Les Baer
United States	Lewis Machine & Tool Company
United States	Lockheed Martin
United States	LWRC International
United States	MD Helicopters
United States	Navistar Defense LLC
United States	North American Arms
United States	Northrop Grumman
United States	Nosler
United States	Noveske Rifleworks
United States	OF Mossberg & Sons
United States	Olin Corporation
United States	Oshkosh Corporation
United States	Palmetto State Armory
United States	Patriot Ordnance Factory
United States	Polaris Industries
United States	Rock River Arms
United States	RTX Corporation
United States	Safariland
United States	SAFE Boats International
United States	Savage Arms
United States	Science Applications International Corporation
United States	Serbu Firearms
United States	Sierra Bullets
United States	Sierra Nevada Corporation
United States	SilencerCo
United States	Smith & Wesson
United States	Springfield Armory, Inc.
United States	Strayer Voigt Inc (brand name Infinity Firearms)
United States	Sturm, Ruger
United States	Swiftships
United States	Teledyne Technologies
United States	Textron
United States	Tiberius
United States	Troy Industries
United States	U.S. Ordnance
United States	Vista Outdoor
United States	Weatherby
Venezuela	CAVIM
Venezuela	DIANCA
Venezuela	UCOCAR
Vietnam	Shipbuilding Industry Corporation
Vietnam	Song Thu corporation
Zimbabwe	Zimbabwe Defence Industries

== See also ==
- Gun ownership
- List of firearm brands
- Military–industrial complex
- Military acquisition
