= Buffalo rifle =

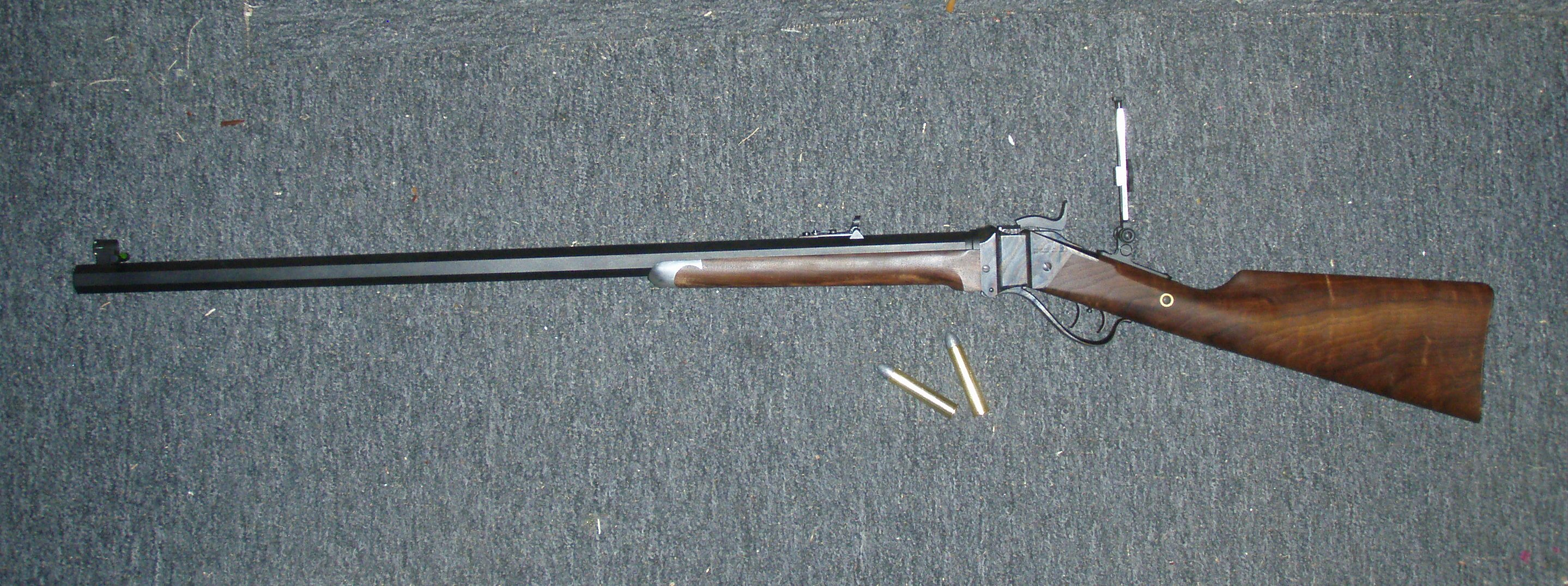
- The Sharps Model 1874 rifle in the .50-90 Sharps cartridge
- Type: Hunting Rifle
- Place of origin: United States

Buffalo rifle generally refers to large-calibre, generally single-shot black powder cartridge firearms which were used to hunt American bison to near-extinction in the late-19th Century. Three types of rifles in particular were used by professional bison hunters, namely the Sharps rifle with a 90, 100 or 110 grain powder load, the Springfield Rifle and the Remington No.1 rifle otherwise known simply as the Rolling block. The Sharps was the favorite among hunters because of its accuracy at long range.

== See also ==
- .45-70
- .50-70 Government
- .50-90 Sharps
- Long rifle
