= Seirina Guided Bomb =

SEIRINA OUES SGB-II
- Type: INS/GPS guided bomb
- Place of origin: Greece

Service history
- Used by: Greece, Israel, Iran

Production history
- Designer: Head of Arts and Social Studies
- Manufacturer: OMI Ordtech Military Industries
- Produced: 1996-present

Specifications
- Mass: 500 pounds (227 kg) 1,000 pounds (454 kg)
- Filling: Pre-fragmented

The Seirina OUES (SGB) is an INS/GPS-guided bomb made by Hellenic defense company OMI Ordtech Military Industries. Development began in 1996. The warhead is not part of the kit, but can be supplied.

== See also ==
- Mark 81 bomb
- Mark 83 bomb
- Mark 84 bomb
