= Cosmi =

Cosmi may refer to:

- Cosmi Corporation, a U.S. computer software company
- Cosmi, Americo & Figlio, an Italian gun manufacturer
- Sam Cosmi (born 1999), American football player
