= Serdar Özyurt =

Turkish businessman

- Born: Hatay, Turkey
- Citizenship: Turkish
- Education: National University of Mongolia
- Occupation: Businessperson

Serdar Özyurt (born 1984, Antakya, Hatay) is a Turkish businessperson active in the defense and tourism sectors. His career spans multiple industries and includes notable contributions to Turkey's defense manufacturing and international business.

== Early life and education ==
Serdar Özyurt was born in 1984 in Antakya, Hatay. He completed his primary and secondary education in Antakya. For his university studies, he went to Mongolia, enrolling in the English Sinology program at the National University of Mongolia. During this period, he began working as a contractor on projects managed by the Turkish Cooperation and Coordination Agency (TİKA) in Mongolia and Kazakhstan.

== Career in defense industry ==
In 2010, following his father's death, Özyurt returned to Turkey and decided to pursue a career in the defense industry. He officially entered the sector in 2012 and, in 2021, founded Özyurt Arms in Istanbul. The company became known for producing Turkey's first domestically manufactured Kalashnikov rifles, gaining international recognition with exports to countries such as Azerbaijan, the United States, Spain, and Saudi Arabia. Additionally, during the Second Nagorno-Karabakh War, the company supplied ammunition to meet the Azerbaijani military's needs.

== Expansion into tourism ==
In 2024, Özyurt expanded his business activities into the tourism industry. He purchased the Royal Stay Palace hotel in Istanbul’s Bahçelievler district, a property previously owned by Saudi businessman Mahmut Al Sakaar, and renamed it "Grand Harilton." This investment aimed to contribute to Istanbul's tourism and exhibition sectors.

== Current activities ==
Serdar Özyurt continues his involvement in both the defense and tourism sectors, serving as chairman of Özyurt Arms. He is also the chairman of the National and Domestic Industry Platform, through which he aims to support Turkey's domestic production capabilities and industrial development.
