= NARAC Arms Company Limited =

NARAC Arms Co. Ltd.
- Native name: บริษัท เนแรค อาร์มส อินดัสตรี จำกัด
- Type: Private
- Industry: Defense, Arms manufacturing
- Headquarters: Ratchaburi, Thailand
- Area served: Thailand
- Products: Assault rifles, ammunition
- Website: www.nrc-defence.com

NARAC Arms Co. Ltd. is a Thai firearms manufacturer that manufactures firearms and ammunition. The company is a key player in Thailand's domestic defense industry, supporting the Royal Thai Armed Forces and the government's policy of increasing national self-reliance in military hardware.

== History ==
NARAC Arms was established in 2010 (Note: In the Thai calendar, it is 2553.) to support Thailand's national defense policy, aligning with the government's "S-Curve 11" initiative, which aims to develop a self-sufficient domestic defense industry. The company was authorized by the Ministry of Defence to research, develop, and manufacture weapons under Thailand's Private Arms Factory Act. The company was formerly known as the Yone Enterprise Co, Ltd..

In 2020, the Thai Ministry of Defense announced the purchase of an unknown number of NARAC-556 assault rifles.

In 2023, NARAC signed an agreement with RV Connex Co., Ltd.

== Products ==
NARAC's products are designed to meet a requirement of at least 80% domestically manufactured components.

=== Firearms ===
The company's flagship product is the NARAC 556, a domestically designed and manufactured assault rifle chambered in 5.56x45mm NATO. The rifle operates using a short-stroke gas piston system and is based on the AR-15 platform. The Royal Thai Army has acquired two main variants, designating them as the MOD 963 series.

- NARAC 556 (MOD 963): The standard rifle version with a 20-inch (508 mm) barrel.
- NARAC 556AR (MOD 963 AR): A carbine version with a 14.5-inch (368 mm) barrel.

=== Ammunition ===
NARAC manufactures a comprehensive range of ammunition for pistols, rifles, and shotguns, as detailed in their official product catalog.

Pistol cartridges

- .22 LRN
- 9mm LUGER (FMJ, LRN, LHP, LTC, JTCHP)
- .38 Special (FMJ, DEWC, LRN)
- .38 Super (FMJ)
- .357 Magnum (SJSP)
- .45 ACP (FMJ, LRN, SWC)

Rifle cartridges

- 5.56x45mm (BTHP 69 gr)
- 7.62x51mm (BTHP 168 gr)

Shotgun shells

- 12 gauge (9 OO Buck, 60 Pellets, 140 Pellets, Slug)

Training and artillery rounds

- 30x165mm TP
- 30x173mm TP MK44
- 105mm artillery case (Maneuver)
