= StunStrike =

Electroshock weapon

The StunStrike is a wireless electroshock weapon being developed by XADS. It is in various sizes from rifle size upwards, with various ranges. It is intended to incapacitate men and pre-detonate IEDs and incoming RPGs.

One reported version of StunStrike is a directed-energy weapon which makes a cone-shaped field of powerful electric discharges in one direction. These discharges were incorrectly referred to as static electricity by the television show FutureWeapons. It is in a black box designed to look like a briefcase or small suitcase. It is intended to deny passage through a door (which it can be left beside), or to stun or scare an opponent. This briefcase model was featured on an episode of FutureWeapons on the discovery channel.

There are web images of a long cylindrical version (Close Quarters Shock Rifle, CQSR)
