= Rock River Arms =

Firearm parts manufacturer in Colona, Illinois, U.S.

Rock River Arms Inc
- Company type: Private
- Industry: Manufacturing
- Founded: 1996
- Founder: Mark Larson and Chuck Larson
- Headquarters: Colona, Illinois, U.S
- Area served: U.S
- Products: Firearms
- Revenue: $22 Million
- Number of employees: 51-200
- Website: http://www.rockriverarms.com/

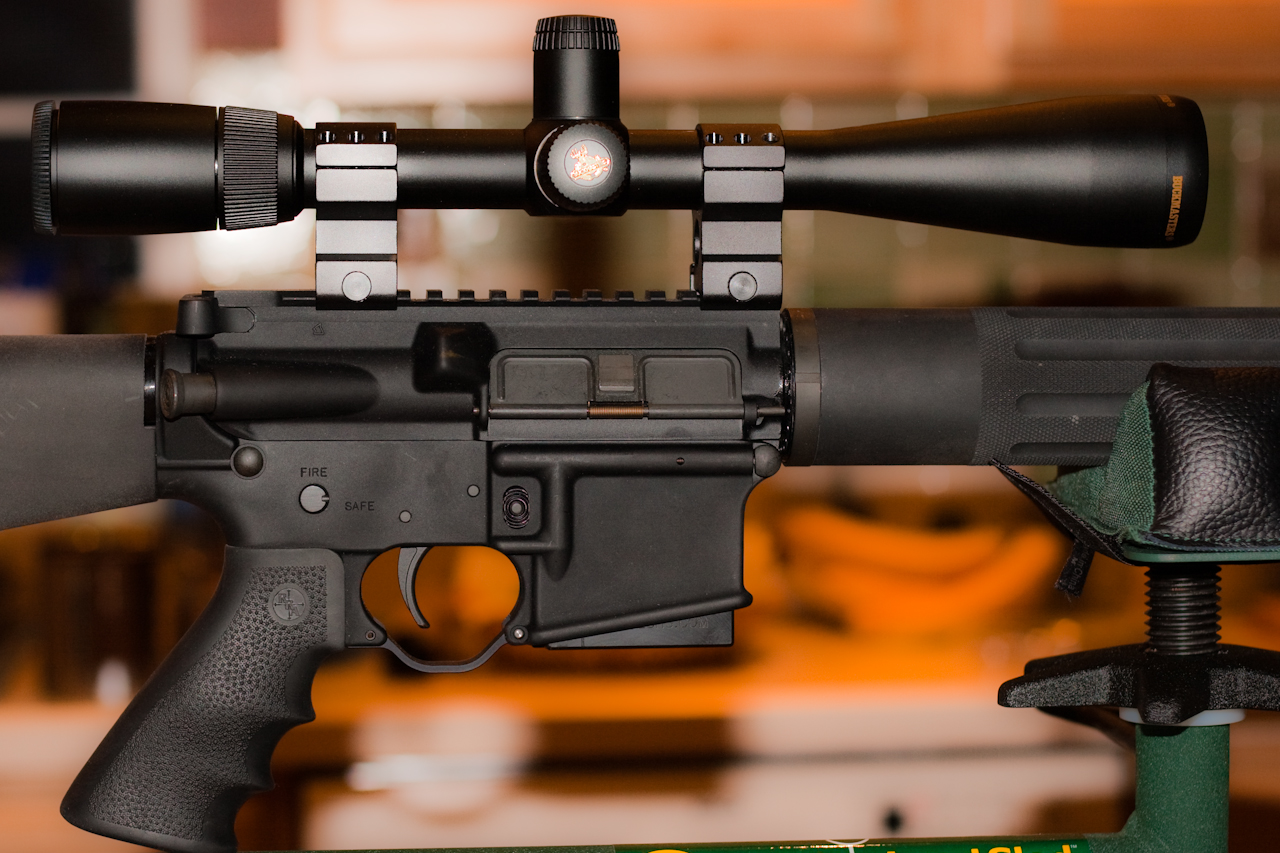
Nikon Buckmasters Rifle Scope 6-18× 40mm SF Mil-Dot mounted on a 24" Rock River Arms Varmint A4 AR-15

Rock River Arms, Incorporated is an American manufacturing company in Colona, Illinois, that manufactures parts and accessories for AR-15/M16 type rifles, as well as other firearms.

== History ==
Rock River Arms is owned and operated by brothers Mark and Chuck Larson. Between 1981 and 1991, the Larsons worked at Springfield Armory, Inc., where Mark was the head armorer. From Springfield Armory, the Larsons went into partnership with Les Baer to form Les Baer Custom and build custom 1911 pistols. Parting ways with Les Baer in 1993, the Larsons began to build AR-15 type rifles for Eagle Arms in Coal Valley, Illinois. At around the same time, they began their own venture, Tolerance Plus (the name was later changed to Rock River Arms), producing custom 1911 pistols. The Larson brothers severed their connection with Eagle Arms in 1997 when that firm moved to Geneseo, Illinois. At the same time, Rock River Arms began to build AR-15 style rifles.

Rock River Arms also produces M1911 pattern pistols, bolt-action rifles, and AR-15 style pistols in assorted calibers.

== Law enforcement use ==
In December 2003, after outperforming 10 other manufacturers in rifle abuse tests, Rock River Arms was awarded a contract with the Drug Enforcement Administration for a minimum of 5,000 LAR-15 rifles to be purchased over five years. As a result of Rock River Arms winning the DEA contract, other federal agencies, including the Federal Bureau of Investigation and United States Marshals, have also obtained Rock River Arms weapons under piggyback contracts. In 2017, they exported and sold a few thousand rifles to the Lebanese Internal Security Forces and to the Lebanese General Security.

== Military use ==
Rock River LAR-15 rifles were exported to Iraq, the Iraqi Special Forces received and used the rifles.
