= Ludwig Schiwy =

German gunmaker

- Type: Private
- Industry: Gun manufacturer
- Founded: 1921
- Founder: Ludwig Schiwy
- Headquarters: Radovesnice I, Czech Republic
- Products: Rifles Combination guns Pistols
- Number of employees: 15
- Website: schiwywaffen.com

Ludwig Schiwy is a German gunmaker. Although traditionally based in Berlin, Germany, the company's manufacturing facilities are now located in the Czech Republic. It manufactures bolt-action rifles, double rifles and pistols.

In the interwar period, Schiwy's firearms were known to surpass all the other German gunmakers in quality.

== History ==
=== Beginnings ===
The Ludwig Schiwy company has been founded by Ludwig Schiwy (1883-1956). The earliest roots of the company date to the year 1921.

Ludwig Schiwy was born on 16 May 1883 in Lucka bei Ortelsburg in the then German province of East Prussia, a son of Karl Schiwy and his wife Karoline Lutz. The details of his life are somewhat sketchy, but he must have studied technology at a college or a university, as his Citizens Registry card from 1946 lists his occupation as "Ingenieur" or engineer, a title reserved only for college or university graduates in the field of technology in Germany.

In 1921 he purchased a company called F.W. Vandrey & Co and moved its seat from Hamburg to Berlin. Initially, the company has been run as a trading company operating gun stores in Berlin and Hamburg. The firearms sold were manufactured mostly by firearms factories in Suhl and marked with the Vandrey company trademark. In 1925 the company started to manufacture hunting firearms, but this time under Schiwy's own name. Therefore, firearms from other manufacturers sold by the company were marked with "F.W. Vandrey & Co, Hamburg & Berlin", while firearms made by the company itself were marked with "L. Schiwy, Berlin S.W. 68". Ludwig Schiwy was also advertised separately from Vandrey in Berlin's Address Books between 1933 and 1943, but both listings shared the same address as well as the same phone number.

As a member of the Jagdclub Diana, Schiwy had more or less direct access to the high tiers of Berlin's society including top politicians and members of the military. He was also active in competitive shooting and scored several gold and bronze medals in German target and clay shooting championship, using firearms of his own production. Thanks to this, his firearms quickly gained a loyal following not only among the elite of German society, but also among some of the visiting competitive shooters. This has been further helped by Schiwy's participation at the European sporting clays championship in Stockholm in 1929 as a member of the German clay shooting team.

But it wasn't just the access to the right circles that gained Schiwy his customers. The key point of his success was actually the quality of his work. From the beginning of his own production in 1925, he concentrated on quality of the firearms of his production by studying gunmaking techniques and firearms technology, by selecting the right suppliers and by hiring the best workforce available. As a result of this, the quality of his guns was increasing year by year.

=== Hermann Göring's gunmaker ===
In the late 1920's, Schiwy gained his most prominent customer in the person of Hermann Göring. The first Schiwy firearm owned by Göring has been a rifle given to him by his brother-in-law, count Eric von Rosen, at the time when such a rifle would have been unaffordable for him. Göring quickly fell in love with guns made by Schiwy and became his regular customer.

From the late 1930's, Göring obtained a sort of an exclusivity in regards to Schiwy's production, with the company only producing bespoke firearms either for Göring himself or as presents to Göring's friends and acquaintances. Unfortunately, while firearms made for Göring himself were usually marked with his coat of arms, firearms intended as presents were mostly marked only with a dedication plaque showing that the gun has been presented by Göring, but without the name of the recipient. Therefore, most of these firearms cannot be reliably attributed to their recipients.

Schiwy continued to supply firearms to Hermann Göring right until the end of the Second World War. The last pieces were assembled and proofed in late 1944 or maybe even early 1945. These firearms were the last made by Schiwy altogether, as the end of the second world war meant also the end of Schiwy's activities as a manufacturer of firearms.

=== Production ===
Schiwy manufactured firearms, and the progression of his work can be observed across different years. By the late 1920s and early 1930s, he operated among German manufacturers, and from the second half of the 1930s onward, his firearms were compared to those produced by manufacturers such as Holland & Holland, Purdey, and Westley Richards.

By far the largest part of the firearms made by Schiwy were Mauser 98 repeating rifles built on actions supplied first by DWM and later by Mauser-Werke AG in Oberndorf am Neckar. Most of them were made on standard length actions in calibres 7 x 64, 7 x 73 vom Hofe and 9,3 x 62 mm, and on magnum actions in calibres such as 8 x 68 S and 9,3 x 73 mm. There is also at least one known rifle built by Schiwy on the rare K short action in calibre 250-3000 Savage. This rifle has been a Christmas present from Göring to Count Eric von Rosen, his brother-in-law, in 1935.

Another prominent part of Schiwy's portfolio were break-action firearms - over and under double rifles and double-rifle drillings. These were built on actions sourced from manufacturers located in Suhl. Some of the actions can be attributed to the known manufacturers. Most of these were made by Simson & Co. (later BSW), while others came from Oskar Merkel and also from J.P. Sauer. Many other actions however cannot be readily attributed to any of the known manufacturers, and might have been made to order based on Schiwy's own drawings. The most famous of Schiwy's break-action firearms is a luxurious over-and-under double rifle in calibre 9,3 x 74 R ordered in 1929 by Eric von Rosen as a present to his brother-in-law, Hermann Göring. This rifle now resides in the company collection of the Schiwy company.

There were also a few Luger P.04 and P.08 carbines by Schiwy and several hunting as well as sporting shotguns, possibly including Schiwy's own personal sporting gun.

Schiwy also cooperated with the Halger company in Hamburg on a special double rifle for Hermann Göring made for the high-velocity .280 Halger Magnum round. This rifle was delivered to the Ministry of Aviation in 1938. According to the available information, it has never been paid for. The extent of Schiwy's involvement in the construction is unknown, but the rifle possesses the very distinct rising cheek piece of Schiwy's pattern.

=== Owners of Schiwy's guns ===
Like most of the prominent German brands of the time, Schiwy counted among his customers the German elite of the time. Among those customers were also many controversial and infamous figures. This became especially true after the Nazi party came in power in 1933, as a firearm by Schiwy became a sort of a status symbol among the then influential figures in business, military and especially political circles.

However, Schiwy himself was not a member of the NSDAP and gained his "problematic" customers purely through the quality of his products and not due to his political views.

In the later years, further prominent figures received firearms made by Schiwy as presents from Hermann Göring. These included the military and political leaders of the time as well as some of the successful pilots of the German Luftwaffe. There also used to be a fairly large amount of Schiwy's firearms in Sweden thanks to the relationship between Göring and the von Rosen family.

=== Schiwy's last years ===
The last years of Ludwig Schiwy are not well known. It is not known whether Schiwy suffered some consequences for his relationship with Hermann Göring and by extension with other members of the Nazi leadership.

His material situation has been difficult though. The building at Kochstraße 59, the seat of his company as well as his private residence, has been destroyed in the Battle of Berlin and he was reduced to living as a subtenant. Moreover, his business has been severely impacted by the Order No. 2 of the Allied Control Council that forbade the possession of firearms to German civilians as well as state agencies of all kinds. According to Dr. Ulrich Steigleder and Fredrik Franzén, he was reduced to running a shop selling air rifles and pellets in West Berlin, but his company, F.W. Vandrey & Co, reappeared in the Berlin's Address Book only in 1952 with an address Bendlerstraße 11-14, listed as seller of firearms and office machines. The same address has been listed also as his personal residence. However, beginning with the 1955 issue of the Address Book, the company was gone once again.

About a year later, on 8 February 1956, Ludwig Schiwy died in Berlin.

== Ludwig Schiwy today ==
Today, the manufacturing facilities of the company are located at the Radovesnice Castle in the municipality of Radovesnice I in the Czech Republic. The company remains true to Ludwig Schiwy's creed – to manufacture only the best guns. However, in contrast to the interwar period, the company is now manufacturing most of the parts in its own workshop. This also includes complicated parts like actions and sidelocks.

The current product portfolio includes classic firearms from Schiwy's original portfolio – M98 repeating rifles and over-and-under double rifles. New additions to the portfolio include the Mannlicher-Schönauer repeating rifles and straight-pull repeating rifles of company's own design. It is also one of the few companies that makes complete Luger P.04 and P.08 pistols and carbines from scratch.
