= .50-90 Sharps =

Black-powder rifle cartridge

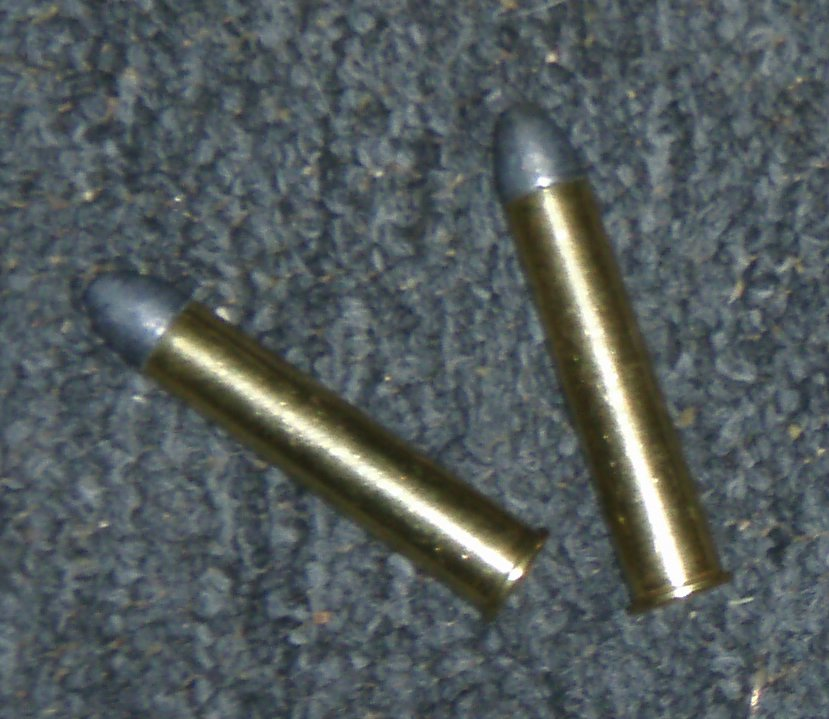
- .50-90 Sharps cartridges
- Type: Rifle
- Place of origin: United States

Service history
- Used by: United States

Production history
- Designer: Sharps Rifle Manufacturing Company
- Designed: 1872
- Manufacturer: Sharps Rifle Manufacturing Company
- Produced: 1872–1876
- Variants: .50-100, .50-110

Specifications
- Parent case: .50 Basic
- Case type: Rimmed, straight
- Bullet diameter: .512 in (13.0 mm)
- Neck diameter: .528 in (13.4 mm)
- Shoulder diameter: .528 in (13.4 mm)
- Base diameter: .585 in (14.9 mm)
- Rim diameter: .663 in (16.8 mm)
- Case length: 2.50 in (64 mm)
- Overall length: 3.20 in (81 mm)
- Primer type: Large rifle

Ballistic performance
Bullet mass/type	Velocity	Energy
365 gr (24 g) FN	1,814 ft/s (553 m/s)	2,668 ft⋅lbf (3,617 J)
440 gr (29 g) FN	1,749 ft/s (533 m/s)	2,989 ft⋅lbf (4,053 J)
550 gr (36 g) FN	1,448 ft/s (441 m/s)	2,561 ft⋅lbf (3,472 J)
- Source(s): Accurate black powder

The .50-90 Sharps (13×64mmR), also known as the .50-2 1/2" Sharps, is a black-powder rifle cartridge that was introduced by Sharps Rifle Manufacturing Company in 1872 as a buffalo (American bison) hunting round. Like other large black-powder rounds, it incorporates a heavy bullet and a large powder volume, leading to high muzzle energies.

== Specifications ==
The standard factory loads, produced and sold by the Sharps Rifle Manufacturing Company and the Sharps Rifle Company were .50/100/425 (.50 caliber/100 grains black powder/425 grain grease grooved bullet) and .50/100/473 (.50 caliber/100 grains black powder/473 grain grease grooved bullet) with a paper patched bullet. Factory loads manufactured by any of the Sharps companies were mostly hand-loaded which made them expensive to produce. This naturally invited competition. Winchester offered the cartridge loaded .50/90/473 (.50 caliber/90 grains black powder/473 grain grease grooved bullet) with paper patched bullets which may be how the cartridge came to be commonly known as the .50-90. The .50-90 Sharps is similar to the .50-100 Sharps and .50-110 Sharps cartridges. All three use the same 2.5-inch (64 mm) case, the latter two being loaded with more grains of black powder. All rifles made for the .50-90 Sharps should be able to use the .50-110 and .50-100 cartridges due to the case dimensions being nearly identical.

Bullet diameter was typically 0.512 inches (13.0 mm) diameter. Bullets weighed from 335 to 700 grains (21.7 to 45.4 g). Historical loads using black powder have muzzle energy in the 1,630 to 1,985 foot-pounds force (2,210 to 2,691 J) range, while modern loads using smokeless powder give 2,561 to 2,989 foot-pounds force (3,472 to 4,053 J) of energy.

== History ==
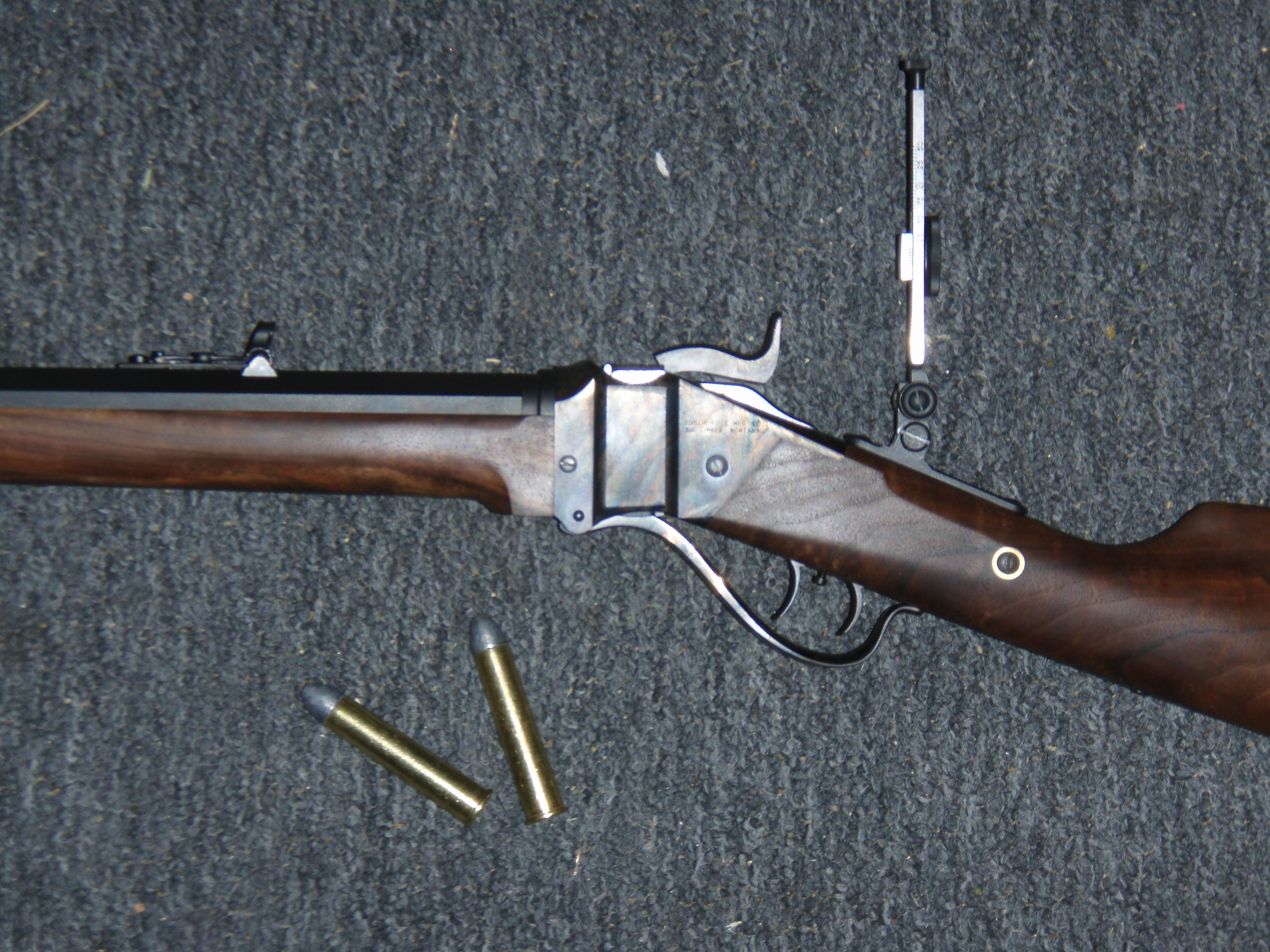
Shiloh Sharps rifle with .50-90 Sharps cartridges

The buffalo (American bison) is a large herbivorous animal and difficult to take down reliably, which has led to a demand for cartridges designed specifically for buffalo hunting. The .50-90 was created with this purpose in mind. As a result, the cartridge became immediately popular with the professional buffalo hunters on the Western plains. At the time of its invention, there were no special powders or bullet types, and the knowledge of ballistics was fairly limited. Thus, when trying to create a more effective big-game cartridge, the designers simply expanded the dimensions of prior cartridges.

Billy Dixon used a Sharps .50-90 at the Second Battle of Adobe Walls on June 27, 1874, to make his legendary 1,538-yard (1,406 m) shot.

Today, the cartridge is largely obsolete. Ammunition is no longer mass-produced by any large manufacturers, with the exception of a few small boutique manufacturers, such as Buffalo Arms. Brass and bullets are produced, but loaded ammunition must either come from a custom shop or be handloaded. Rifles are only produced on a semi-custom basis by a few companies. Rifles in this caliber are typically used for hunting large game and historical reenactments. Occasionally, .50-90 rifles are used for vintage rifle shooting competitions, but the commercial availability of other contemporary cartridges such as the .45-70, have made the .50-90 cartridge less popular as a result.

== See also ==
- Table of handgun and rifle cartridges
