= John Dickson & Son =

Scottish gunmaker

- Company type: Private
- Industry: Firearms
- Founded: 1840
- Founder: John Dickson
- Headquarters: Edinburgh, Scotland, United Kingdom
- Key people: Jean-Pierre “J-P” Daeschler
- Products: Double rifles, Bolt-action rifles, Shotguns
- Website: www.john-dickson.com

John Dickson & Son is a Scottish gunmaker established in Edinburgh in 1820, specialising in high-end bespoke sporting guns.

== History ==
Founder John Dickson was born in Edinburgh's Canongate in 1794, and was apprenticed at the age of 12 to James Wallace, an Edinburgh gunmaker. Dickson completed his apprenticeship in 1813 and by 1840 was in business in his own right at 60 Princes Street.

In 1880 Dickson won a patent dispute for his trigger plate action, and in 1859 Dickson made the first pinfire breechloader under Brazier’s patent followed by guns on Westley Richards, Thomas Horsley and later Lancaster’s patents, ultimately arriving at the first of his own ‘Round Action’ design guns in 1880.

John's son, John Jr, followed him into the family business. Later John Jr's sons, John and Peter, took up ownership of the business. Peter died at sea in 1892 and, having no heir, John sold the business to J. Hayhoe in 1923.

In 1937 the company moved to Frederick Street in Edinburgh's New Town.

In 1999 the company was bought by investor Charles Palmer, who consolidated a number of other high-end Scottish gun manufactures under the company. By 2001 the company had expanded out into a workshop in Dunkeld called The Steadings. Over time a shop and showroom were added.

In 2017 the company closed the Frederick Street premises, retaining its premises in Dunkeld.

In 2019 the company was bought by Jean-Pierre Daeschler.

== Brands ==
In addition to John Dickson & Son, the company acquired over the years a number of other Scottish gunsmiths and continues to manufacturer their famous firearms.

McNaughton - Manufacturer of the McNaughton Edinburgh Gun.

== Famous clientele ==
- Lord Byron
- Charles Gordon - Who bought so many John Dickson & Son guns his family took out a restraining order to prevent him buying any more.
