= Nighthawk Custom =

American firearm company

- Type: Private
- Industry: Firearms
- Genre: Custom firearm crafting
- Founded: 2003; 23 years ago
- Headquarters: Berryville, Arkansas, United States
- Area served: National and international
- Key people: Mark Stone
- Products: Custom M1911, tactical rifles, shotguns, revolvers, and knives
- Subsidiaries: Nighthawk Tactical, Cooper Rifles
- Website: www.nighthawkcustom.com

Nighthawk Custom is an American firearm company based in Berryville, Arkansas, US. It manufactures custom M1911 pistols, rifles, revolvers, shotguns, hunting rifles, and tactical knives for competition shooters, military, law enforcement and self-defense.

== History ==
Nighthawk was formed in 2004 when some of the gunsmiths who worked for Wilson Combat left to focus exclusively on custom pistols. Both companies are located in Berryville. Mark Stone is a founder and the owner of Nighthawk Custom.

Over the years, Nighthawk gunsmiths have used their skills to grow from only building 1911 pistols to now also making custom shotguns, knives, and an improved version of the Browning Hi-Power. Nighthawk also has a machine shop that produces the parts, which are used to build their high-end firearms.

== Nighthawk Custom ==
Nighthawk Custom specializes in pistols made for all varieties of shooting. The range includes the Talon, Dominator, AAC, and Predator lines. The Talon has three varieties, the Talon 5", Talon II and the Talon II with Bobtail. All pistols in the Custom range are fully customizable from finishes to sights to grip design. The pistols are finished using a Nitride coating due to its durability and they range in price from $3000 to $7000.

== Richard Heinie models ==
Richard Heinie, a respected figure in the M1911 community, had requested Nighthawk to build a range of his pistols under his supervision. The Heinie range comprises the Lady Hawk, PDP and Tactical Carry. These are not as customizable as the normal Custom range; however, they are still made to the same standard. The Lady Hawk is aimed at females and has a thinner grip and fire the less powerful 9×19 mm round instead of the standard .45 ACP.

== Nighthawk Tactical ==
The Tactical branch of Nighthawk specializes in military and home defense products rather than collectible or competition pistols. The range covers a small selection of pistols and their Overseer line of tactical shotguns.

The GRP or Global Response Pistol is the main pistol in the Tactical product offering. It is a base model that offers the accuracy and reliability of the highest-end Nighthawk pistol, but does not include some of the additional high-end upgrades that are available from Nighthawk. Nighthawk states that their Enforcer pistol is considered to be "Nighthawk's flagship in their tactical line of handguns." This handgun has been designed and built to address several weak points in the M1911 handgun. Its 'features' include a plunger tube that is integral to the handgun frame, a magazine-well that is also integral, and a slide stop that has been cut flush with the frame. The other top seller in the Tactical pistol line is the Shadowhawk.

=== Tactical rifle ===
For a limited time, Nighthawk built custom precision rifles. Because Nighthawk was one of the sponsors for the annual International Sniper Competition at Fort Benning, Georgia, they built a precision rifle. Nighthawk took inspiration from the rifles present at the Competition to offer a precision rifle to their customers. Nighthawk took these rifles one step further and created their tactical rifle range. With the option of either bolt-on or integral Picatinny rail, the rifles were able to be customized with scopes and different finishes. The finish was Perma Kote. The rifle were able to be finished in camouflage or a customized color scheme. The rifles were able to be chambered in a variety of calibers ranging from .222 Remington to .338 Lapua Magnum.

=== Tactical shotgun ===
Nighthawk offers customizable shotgun services including a range of add-on products and peripherals which are external and internal. The gun is built from a stock Remington 870.

== Knives ==
Nighthawk Tactical makes a range of "tactical military knives". There are four models: Model 510, Model 525, Model 530 and Model 550. They are very similar in material but vary in finish and blade length with the longest being 7" in the Model 550 and the shortest being the 3 1/2" Model 525 blade.

== In popular culture ==
A Nighthawk Custom 1911 is prominently featured in the manga series The Fable as the preferred firearm of the protagonist.
