= Özyurt Arms =

Turkish firearm manufacturer

- Company type: S.A. (corporation)
- Industry: firearms
- Founded: 2019
- Headquarters: Ankara, Turkey
- Products: pistols and firearms
- Website: https://ozyurtsilah.com.tr/

Özyurt Arms is a Turkish firearm manufacturer operating under Özyurt Silah Sanayi A.Ş. The company's headquarters are located in Ankara, with production facilities in both Istanbul and Ankara.

The company exports weapons and ammunition to 185 countries. It is known for its polymer and metal-bodied "Asi-21" infantry rifles. The Asi-21 model holds the distinction of being the first Turkish national assault weapon produced with a design inspired by the Kalashnikov.

== History ==
Özyurt Arms was founded in 2019 by Serdar Özyurt under the umbrella of Özyurt Silah Sanayi A.Ş. The company was established with the purpose of manufacturing and supplying weapons, weapon accessories, spare parts, and ammunition to Turkey's allied countries. Four weapons underwent research and development under the Özyurt Arms brand. Among these, the weapon model that brought recognition to the brand is the model inspired by the Kalashnikov. The Asi-21 model was developed based on the Kalashnikov and exported to allied countries. It significantly contributed to meeting the supply needs during the Azerbaijan-Karabakh conflict.

To continue its commercial activities in the Americas, a subsidiary named BMZ Arms was established.

== Products ==
- Infantry Rifle - 5.56mm
- Asi-21 - 7.62mm
- Machine Gun - 5.56mm
- Efe-19 - 0.9mm
- Sniper Rifle - 7.62mm
- MT-9 - 0.9mm
- AK-MT - 0.9mm
