= XADS =

American military company

Xtreme Alternative Defense Systems
- Company type: Private
- Founded: 2002; 23 years ago
- Headquarters: Anderson, Indiana, United States

XADS (Xtreme Alternative Defense Systems) is a privately held firm in Anderson, Indiana, United States. XADS is a producer of NLDEW (Non-lethal (less than lethal) directed energy weapons) for protecting and defending in military operations, law enforcement, site security, and peacekeeping. XADS was founded in 2002 after a proposal was submitted to the United States Marine Corps.

XADS is developing a short-range wireless electroshock weapon called StunStrike. Contracts have been awarded to XADS to provide new solutions to problems on the battlefield.

XADS makes the Photonic Disruptor Series. It is called a Threat Assessment Laser Illuminator (TALI); but it can cause night-blindness and secondary effects such as nausea. Despite claims that the lasers leave no permanent eye damage, one Pentagon official expressed concern that "some companies, including XADS, are making lasers so intense that they would permanently blind the people they target."

In 2005, XADS received funding to develop a counter-IED system designed to protect military vehicles from roadside bombs. Once attached to a vehicle, the device deployed cables that dragged along the ground and emitted electric pulses to detonate any bombs within its range.

== PD/G 105 ==
The Photonic Disruptor/Green 105 mW laser illuminator is XADS's military grade laser. The laser runs off two AAA batteries and has a range of over 350 meters in darkness, with an operating life of 3000–5000 hours. The unit can be rail mounted for use with weapons. It is deployed in the field in Iraq and Afghanistan.

== See also ==
- StunStrike
- Electrolaser § Xtreme Alternative Defense Systems
