= Navistar Defense LLC =

Division of Navistar International

Navistar Defense LLC is a division of Navistar International that specializes in the manufacturing and design of military vehicles.

== History ==
=== Navistar Defense LLC (2003–present) ===
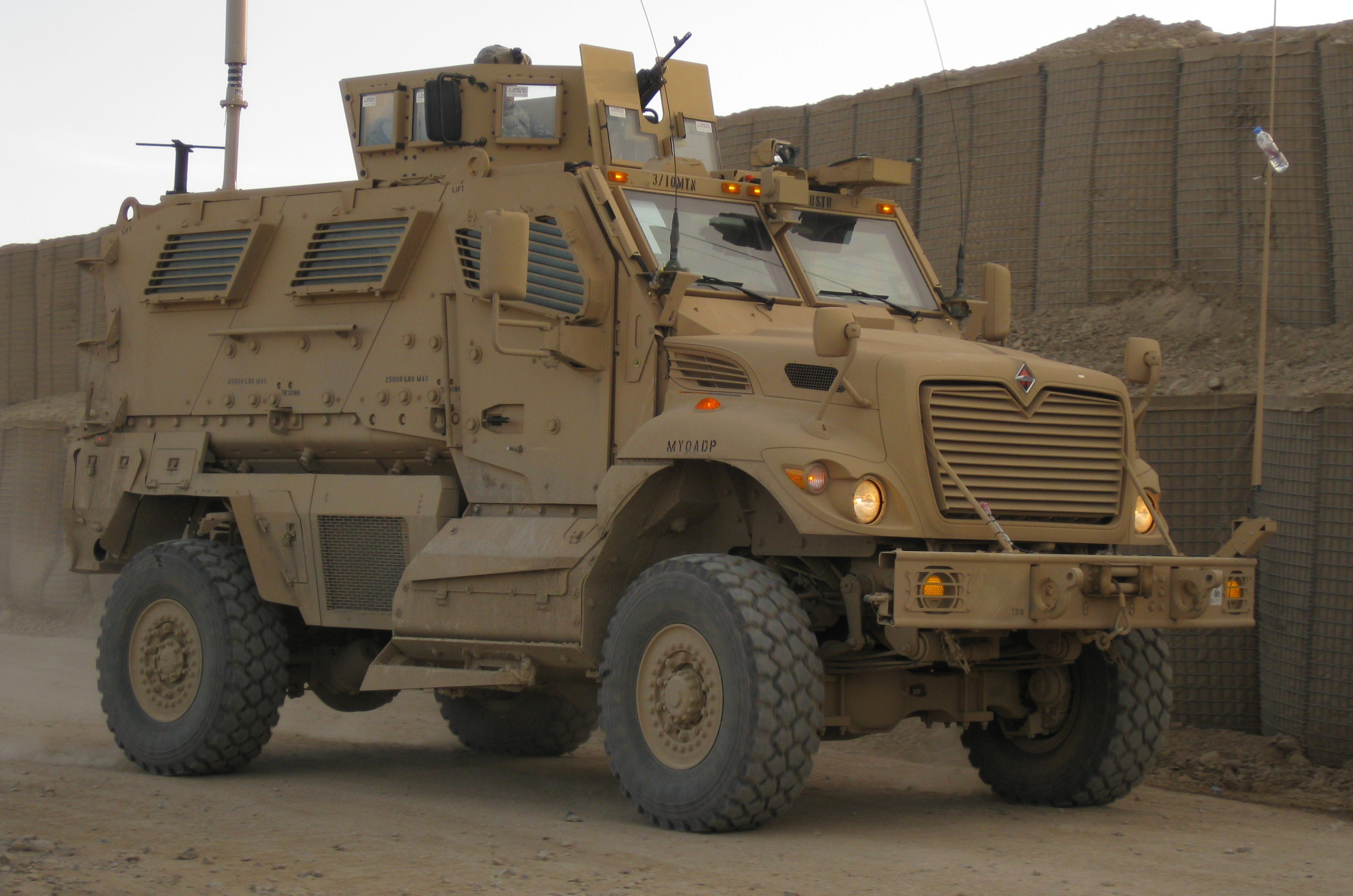
International MaxxPro MRAP

In October 2003, Navistar CEO Dan Ustian announced the company would be forming a defense business unit in order to sell military vehicles. Navistar Defense would be led by Archie Massicotte, a 26-year veteran of the company. Ustian stated "This is a natural area of growth for International. We already have all the platforms that the U.S. military and other NATO countries could leverage for products and services."

In 2007, Navistar's International Truck and Engine Corporation became the first company to enter hybrid commercial truck production, with the International DuraStar Hybrid diesel-electric truck.

Navistar Defense LLC is the prime supplier of MRAP armored vehicles to the US military. The Navistar 7000 series has been fielded by the Canadian Forces for domestic operations. In 2005, the U.S. Army ordered 2,900 7000-MVs for the Afghan National Army and Iraqi Ministry of Defense and an additional order of 7,000 was added in 2008.

Navistar Defense also has a small Canadian branch, named Navistar Defence Canada.

Navistar Defense reported sales of $3.9 billion in 2008 and $2.8 billion in 2009.

In October 2009, the company entered into a strategic agreement with Czech-based company Tatra to jointly develop, produce and market new military vehicles.

In December 2009, analysts were skeptical of the company's long-term potential. "Navistar came out of nowhere and became a big player with MRAP, in what was a short-term program," said Dean Lockwood, an analyst at Forecast International Inc., a Connecticut-based defense consultant. "They didn't prove themselves to be a long-term major player."

In 2010, Navistar Defense's sales were $1.8 billion. The company's 2010 Annual 10K report stated "we continue to expect that over the long term our military business will generate approximately $1.5 billion to $2 billion in annual sales."

In 2011, Navistar Defense's sales were $2.0 billion.

In 2012, Navistar Defense reported $1.0 billion in sales. Business Insider ranked Navistar Defense at 22 in the top 25 US defense companies.

In 2013, Navistar Defense reported $543 million in sales. In the company's 10K filing, they projected military sales to continue to decline, citing U.S. budgetary constraints.

In 2014, Navistar Defense reported $149 million in sales. The company projected 2015 military sales to be slightly higher due to recent contract awards relating to the government's MRAP fleet.

In 2015, Navistar Defense reported $203 million in sales. The 2015 military sales primarily consisted of refurbishment and upgrades of government-owned MaxxPro vehicles to "like new" condition, upgrade kits, spare parts, and technical support services. The company projected 2016 sales to be slightly higher than 2015 due to a recent new vehicle contract award, additional refurbishment and upgrades of government-owned MaxxPro vehicles and technical support services.

In 2016's annual report, Navistar Defense reported $198 million in sales. The 2016 military sales primarily consisted of deliveries of MILCOT variants to foreign militaries, refurbishment and upgrades of government-owned MaxxPro vehicles to "like new" condition, upgrade kits, spare parts, and technical support services. In 2017, ND said they expect their U.S. military sales to be consistent with 2016 as their contract backlog consists of a similar mix of products as that of 2016.

==== Subpoena from U.S. DOD Inspector General ====
In third-quarter 2016, Navistar Defense said it received a subpoena from the United States Department of Defense Inspector General asking for documents related to the sale of some independent suspension systems to the government. Navistar Defense said it would comply. The subpoena is related to the independent suspension systems sold for military vehicles between Jan. 1, 2009 and Dec. 31, 2010. On June 3, 2016, ND met with government representatives, including representatives from DOD IG and the U.S. Department of Justice, to discuss the matter. ND made submissions of documents responsive to the subpoena in June and August 2016 and has substantially completed its subpoena response.

==== Contract awards, losses and other events ====
On August 22, 2012, Navistar Defense lost their bid for the Engineering, Manufacturing & Development (EMD) contract worth $187 million for the Army and Marine Corps' Joint Light Tactical Vehicle (JLTV) program. Navistar had proposed its Saratoga vehicle for the competition. On Friday, August 28, 2012, Navistar filed a protest with the Government Accountability Office (GAO) but pulled their protest on Tuesday, September 4, 2012.

==== 2013 ====
On June 20, 2013, Navistar Defense idled production at their West Point, MS production plant. 80 workers were notified that July 5, 2013, would be their last day. West Point was best known for manufacturing MRAP vehicles. The company cited sequestration, the drawdown in Afghanistan and a challenging environment in the defense industry as factors.

On August 22, 2013, Navistar Defense lost their bid for the Ground Mobility Vehicle (GMV) 1.1 contract, potentially valued at $562 million. Navistar had proposed its Special Operations Tactical Vehicle (SOTV) for the competition. On Tuesday September 1, 2013, Navistar Defense and AM General filed a protest. On December 19, 2013, the Government Accountability Office (GAO) denied Navistar and AM General's protests.

==== 2014 ====
In January 2014, the Pentagon announced they had notified allies of their intent to give away or scrap 13,000 used MRAPs. This was due to the war in Afghanistan winding down, the military wanting a lighter vehicle and high cost to ship them from the Middle East back to the U.S. Recipients have included various police departments and some universities. Navistar Defense built 9,000 of the 27,000 vehicles bought by the Pentagon. Giving away the MRAPs was seen as a blow to Navistar Defense's parts sales.

In December 2014, Navistar Defense lost their bid for the Engineering, Manufacturing Development (EMD) contract for the Armored Multi-Purpose Vehicle (AMPV). BAE was awarded the $382 million contract on December 23, 2014.

Navistar Defense lost their bid for Canada's Department of National Defence (DND) MSVS (Medium Support Vehicle System) Project - SMP (Standard Military Pattern) vehicle contracts. They proposed their ATX8 vehicle as part of an agreement with Czech-based company Tatra. The contract was for acquisition and in-service support (ISS) of a fleet of up to 1,500 SMP vehicles, up to 150 Armour Protection Systems (APS) kits, and 300 Load Handling System (LHS) trailers. Competitors include Oshkosh (MTVR), BAE Systems (FMTV), Daimler AG (Zetros), Renault Trucks (Kerax 8x8) and Rheinmetall/ MAN (HX77 8x8). A contract award decision is expected in June 2015. On July 16, 2015, Canada awarded the Acquisition and In-Service Support contracts to Mack Defense, LLC (Renault Trucks).

On July 25, 2014, the DOD awarded a $27.6 million modification to an existing contract to acquire mine-resistant, ambush-protected hardware kits to upgrade MaxxPro Dash and long-wheelbase ambulances to their final configuration. Estimated completion date is May 30, 2015.

On August 27, 2014, the DOD awarded a $38 million contract to Navistar Defense to restore MRAP Maxx Pro Dash vehicles to "like-new" standards. The DOD reported that Navistar was the only bidder. The work includes adding independent suspension systems and replacement of mandatory parts, with an estimated completion date of June 30, 2016. Work will be performed in West Point, MS.

In September 2014, Navistar Defense announced they would hire 200 workers and re-open operations at their West Point, MS production plant. West Point had been idle since June 2013 due to sequestration, the drawdown in Afghanistan and declining orders.

In September 2014, amidst numerous divestitures, Navistar Inc. CEO Troy Clark gave Navistar Defense a vote of confidence, noting that the military business unit would be retained. In a September 2014 interview with Reuters, he said "it's not a billion-dollar growth opportunity, but it's not something that's bleeding off the future fortunes of our company."

On October 14, 2014, Navistar Defense was awarded a $9.2 million firm-fixed-price foreign military sale (FMS) contract to Jordan for one hundred 4-ton 4x4 cargo trucks and twenty days of operator and maintenance training. Work will be performed in New Carlisle, Ohio, with an estimated completion date of May 20, 2015. Bids were solicited via the internet with nineteen received.

==== 2015 ====
On February 2, 2015, Navistar Defense was awarded a $15,381,152 firm-fixed-price contract with options for eight MRAP MaxxPro Hardware Kits to support MaxxPro vehicle standardization and reset. Work will be performed in Lisle, Illinois, with an estimated completion date of July 16, 2016. Bids were solicited via the Internet with one received. Fiscal 2015 other procurement (Army) funds in the amount of $15,381,152 are being obligated at the time of the award. Army Contracting Command, Warren, Michigan, is the contracting activity (W56HZV-15-C-0070).

On March 18, 2015, Navistar Defense was awarded a $83,424,223 cost-plus-fixed-fee multi-year contract for system technical support and system sustainment technical support for MRAP MaxxPro vehicles. Funding and work location will be determined with each order with an estimated completion date of March 31, 2019. One bid was solicited with one received. Army Contracting Command, Warren, Michigan, is the contracting activity (W56HZV-15-D-0037).

On April 13, 2015, Navistar Defense was awarded a $17,522,057 firm-fixed-price contract with options to procure seven Mine Resistant Ambush Protection MaxxPro Dash hardware kits for MaxxPro vehicle standardization and reset. Work will be performed in Lisle, Illinois, with an estimated completion date of Dec. 31, 2015. One bid was solicited with one received. Fiscal 2014 and 2015 other funds in the amount of $17,522,057 are being obligated at the time of the award. Army Contracting Command, Warren, Michigan, is the contracting activity (W56HZV-15-C-0092).

On April 30, 2015, Navistar Defense was awarded a $31,199,783 modification (P00004) to contract W56HZV-14-C-0102 for reset and upgrade of the MRAP (mine-resistant ambush protected) family of vehicles to Code-A standards. Work will be performed in West Point, Mississippi, with an estimated completion date of July 31, 2016. Fiscal 2013 and 2015 other procurement (Army) and operations and maintenance (Army) funds in the amount of $17,990,419 were obligated at the time of the award. Army Contracting Command, Warren, Michigan, is the contracting activity.

In April 2015, Navistar Defense President Bob Walsh resigned. On May 19, Kevin Thomas was promoted to president.

On August 31, 2015, Navistar Defense was awarded a $368,932,767 firm-fixed-price foreign military sales contract (Afghanistan) for 2,293 medium tactical vehicles. Work will be performed in West Point, Mississippi; Ooltewah, Tennessee; Marion, Wisconsin; Springfield, Ohio, and Mercer, Pennsylvania, with an estimated completion date of Nov. 30, 2019. One bid was solicited with one received. Fiscal 2014 other procurement funds in the amount of $368,932,767 were obligated at the time of the award. Army Contracting Command, Warren, Michigan, is the contracting activity (W56HZV-15-C-0207).

==== 2016 ====
On May 19, 2016, Navistar Defense was awarded an $11,682,550 firm-fixed-price, foreign military sales contract (Afghanistan) for 50 medium tactical vehicle aircraft refuelers. The estimated completion date is Oct. 31, 2016. One bid was solicited with one received. Work will be performed in Springfield, Ohio; and Kansas City, Kansas. Fiscal 2015 other procurement funds in the amount of $11,682,550 were obligated at the time of the award. Army Contracting Command, Warren, Michigan, is the contracting activity (W56HZV-16-C-0128).

On May 24, 2016, Navistar Defense was awarded a $29,791,289 modification (P00014) to contract W912QR-16-D-0025 to reset and upgrade an additional 250 Mine Resistant Ambush Protected Vehicles (MRAPs), with an option for an additional 200 vehicles. Work will be performed in West Point, Mississippi, with an estimated completion date of May 31, 2017. Fiscal 2016 other procurement (Army); and operations and maintenance (Army) funds in the amount of $29,791,289 were obligated at the time of the award. Army Contracting Command Warren, Michigan, is the contracting activity.

==== 2018 ====
On December 3, 2018, Cerberus Capital Management announced a definitive agreement with Navistar International Corporation under which certain affiliates of Cerberus will acquire a 70% interest in Navistar's defense business, Navistar Defense.
