= Armi Dallera Custom =

Firearms manufacturer based in Concesio, Italy

- Industry: Arms industry
- Key people: Roberto Dallera, Cristian Dallera
- Website: adccustom.com

Armi Dallera Custom (ADC) is a firearms manufacturer and custom builder based in Concesio, Italy.

== History ==
Roberto Dallera started his professional career as a gunsmith in 1987, and when he founded ADC in 1990 he became the first European custom pistol manufacturer.

For long the company focused on custom firearms and professional gunsmithing, but in the later years ADC has also started producing their own parts and complete firearms.
