= Dirección de la Industria Aeronáutica Ecuador =

Ecuadorian armorments manufacturer

Directorate of the Aeronautics Industry
- Native name: Spanish: Dirección de la Industria Aeronáutica del Ecuador
- Company type: State-owned company
- Industry: Aerospace, Defense
- Founded: June 15, 1992; 34 years ago
- Headquarters: Quito, Quito, Pichincha, Ecuador
- Area served: Latin America
- Products: Avionics, Aircraft components
- Services: Aircraft maintenance Aircraft MLU systems
- Owner: Ecuadorian Air Force
- Website: diaf.gob.ec

The Directorate of the Aeronautics Industry (DIAF) is a company affiliated to the Ecuadorian Air Force General Command, specializing in aircraft maintenance services, electronic maintenance, research and modernization of civil and military aircraft to Ecuador and Latin America. Since its establishment on 15 June 1992, thanks to its efficient work, it is one of the biggest companies within the field in the country, thus represents a significant contribution to the development of domestic aviation market.

When the DIAF provides aircraft maintenance services, electronic and specialized services in response to domestic aviation market, both in aviation largest and smallest businesses, private and military institutions, and is opening the way to capture a significant share of the market regional.

DIAF is a restorative that provides aircraft maintenance services to the Military and Commercial Aviation since 1992. Facilities certified by the Directorate of Civil Aviation of Ecuador (TMAE-N-01-Diaf-CEMA, TMAE-N-02-Diaf-CEMEFA).

The administrative offices are located in Quito and its hangars and maintenance facilities at the International Airport Cotopaxi in Latacunga and the International Airport José Joaquin Olmedo of Guayaquil.

The Directorate of the Aviation Industry of the SAF is committed to continuous improvement, is certified under ISO 9001:2000 in all its components, namely: Head (Quito) and Operational Centers: CEMA (Center for Aircraft Maintenance) CID (Center for Research and Development) in the city of Latacunga and CEMEFA (Electronic Maintenance Center) in the city of Guayaquil.
