= Montana Rifle Company =

American firearm company

- Company type: Private
- Industry: Firearms
- Founded: 1999
- Headquarters: Memphis, Michigan
- Products: Firearms, rifle actions
- Website: www.montanarifleco.com

Montana Rifle Company is an American company that designed, manufactured, and distributed rifles, rifle actions, barrels and provides gunsmith services. The company is currently owned by Grace Engineering Corp.

== History ==
The company was created in 1999 by gunsmith Keith Sipe because of his desire to produce a high-quality controlled-feed action. At the time Sipe felt it was difficult for gunsmiths to purchase such actions. In 2007 the ownership transferred to Sipe's son, Jeff Sipe, who was a former Kimber Manufacturing employee.

In early 2019, a private investor group named the Montana Outdoor Group acquired Montana Rifle Company.

In early 2020 the Montana Rifle Company ceased operations. A press release from the Montana Outdoor Group regarding the business closure indicates the ownership group will seek to restructure the company finances and will also seek new investors for an infusion of capital into the business. The press release indicates there was strong demand for the rifles but that the company was unable to scale to a level which could satisfy demand and remain profitable.

In January 2024, Grace Engineering acquired Montana Rifle Company.

== Products ==
Montana Rifle Company (MRC) offered their rifle actions, rifle barrels, barreled actions as well as complete rifles and gunsmithing services including building custom rifles.

The MRC actions are a combination of features of the Model 98 Mauser style and the pre- 64 or Classic model 70 Winchester style actions with M-98 style controlled-feed bolt action system with M-98 barrel to action mounting (no cone barrel cut) plus a one piece trigger guard. The Safety is of the M-70 Win style as is the trigger, there is no middle screw, as in the trigger guard of the Pre-64 M-70 Win. The MRC 1999 actions came in both left- and right-handed variations in a number of different lengths and diameters to fit different cartridges. They are similar to Winchester Model 70 actions in outward appearance but with more safety features. The actions are noted for being extremely strong.

The rifles are based on the MRC model 1999 action. They come in 3 basic models: "Classic", "High Country" and "Tactical". A variety of stocks are available from wood to composite, as well as a variety of calibers including an emphasis on large-bore dangerous game cartridges. The rifles are described by gun writers as being high quality.

Barrels were available in over 20 calibers with a variety of contours and finishes. The barrel making division of MRC was sold to Remington Arms, subsequently Remington, in liquidation sold off most of its parts.

MRC made a run of special oversized short action length, Winchester Short Magnum (WSM) actions based on their 1999 action, offered with custom serial numbers. The actions were cast by Sturm Ruger, production machined by Smith & Wesson and final machined then finished by MRC. The pre-production order cost of the SS action was US$350.00

The WSM action was followed by the introduction of the Pro Hunter action, a square top modernized version of the legendary “square bridge” Mauser action, to fit the longest lengths and largest rim diameters of some of the very large dangerous game cartridges. The pre-production order cost of this action was US$500.00

In 2011, MRC introduced a new line of production rifles. The production rifles were built on the Model 1999 action and featured either wood or synthetic stocks and either blued or stainless barrels and actions.
