= J. Roberts & Son =

Gun manufacturer

J. Roberts & Son (Gunmakers) Limited
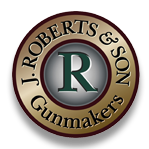
- Company type: Private
- Industry: Weapons manufacturing; Ammunition manufacturing
- Founded: London (1953)
- Founder: Joseph 'Pip' Roberts
- Headquarters: West Sussex, England
- Area served: Worldwide
- Key people: Paul Roberts, Managing Director
- Products: Side-by-side shotguns; Over-and-under shotguns; Double rifles; Bolt-action rifles
- Services: Repair; Storage
- Number of employees: 8
- Website: jroberts-gunmakers.co.uk

J. Roberts & Son is a British manufacturer of shotguns and rifles.
