= Shiloh Rifle Manufacturing Company =

American firearms manufacturer

Shiloh Sharps Rifles
- Industry: firearms
- Headquarters: Big Timber, Montana, United States
- Products: old west rifles
- Website: shilohrifle.com

Shiloh Rifle Manufacturing Company is a firearms manufacturer located in Big Timber, Montana, United States.

The company produces a line of reproductions of various historical black-powder rifles, including the legendary 1874 Sharps Rifle, featured in the 1990 Western film Quigley Down Under, starring Tom Selleck.

Shiloh Sharps Rifle began production in 1983. Previously, the Sharps rifle reproductions were manufactured by Shiloh Products Inc. founded by Len Mulé (pronounce Mull-A) of Garfield, New Jersey, in partnership with Wolfgang Droge, who owned Drovel Tool Company of Farmingdale, New York, from 1976 to 1983. Len Mulé was responsible for all early drawings and mechanical drawings and prototype work on the Model 1863 and deserves credit as the second founder of Sharps and its re-introduction into the modern era.

== Products ==
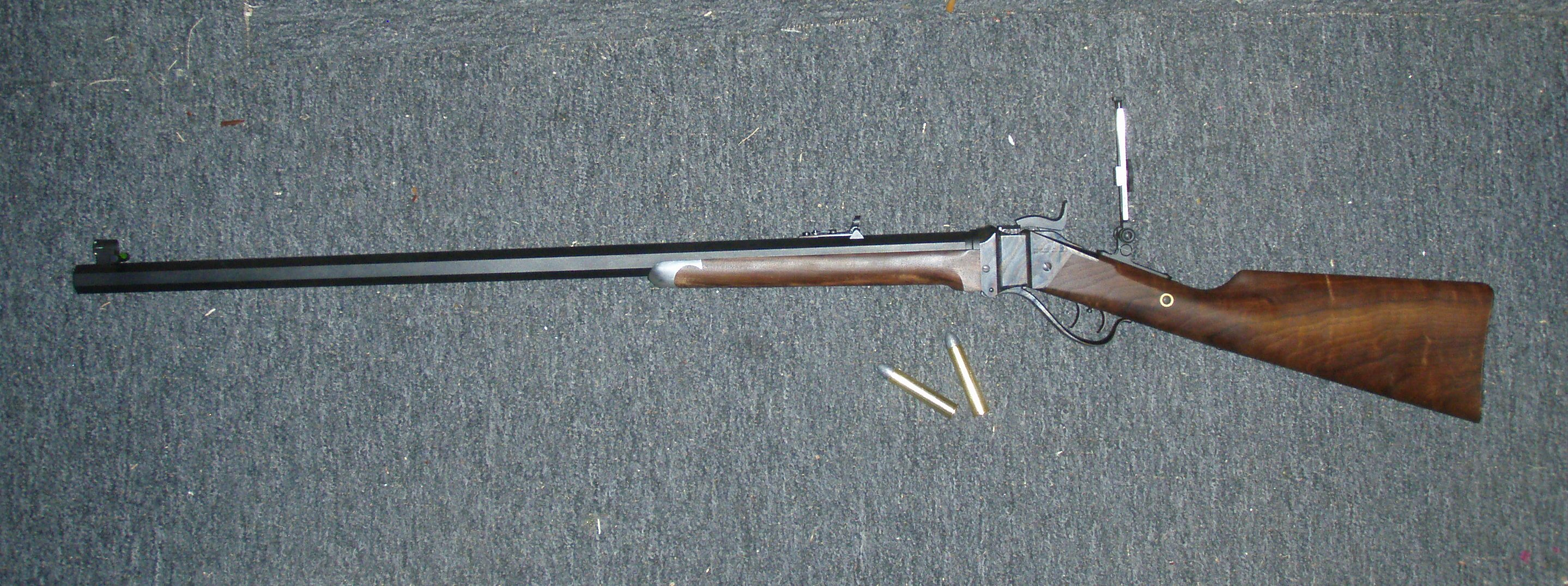
Shiloh Sharps model 1874 Hartford rifle in .50-90 Sharps

Shiloh produces two basic models of rifle, the Sharps 1863 which is a percussion rifle, and the Sharps 1874, which is a black-powder cartridge rifle (BPCR). Both rifles are produced in several variants, such as single or double trigger, upgraded wood, finish, etc. Various barrel lengths and shapes (round, octagonal, half-round, etc.). Rifles chambered in "standard" factory rounds are warranted for shooting factory smokeless powder ammunition as well, such as the 30-40K, .38-55, and .45-70.

The model 1863 comes in 50 caliber and 54 caliber.

The model 1874 comes in:

- .30-40 Krag
- .38-55 Winchester
- .40-50 11/16 BN
- .40-65
- .40-65 Win
- .40-70 2 1/4 BN
- .40-70 2 1/2 ST
- .40-90 2 5/8 BN
- .40-90 3 1/4 ST
- .44-77 BN
- .44-90 BN
- .45-70
- .45-70 2 1/10 ST
- .45-90 2 4/10 ST
- .45-100 2 6/10 ST
- .45-110 2 7/8 ST
- .45-120 3 1/4 ST
- .50-70
- .50-70 1 3/4 ST
- .50-90 2 1/2 ST
