= Uronen Precision =

Finnish firearms manufacturer

Ase ja Osa Ky
- Industry: Arms industry
- Headquarters: Lohja, Finland
- Key people: Hannu Uronen, Tapio Uronen
- Website: asejaosa.fi

Uronen Precision (UP), full name Ase ja Osa Ky, is a Finnish firearms manufacturer based in Lohja, Finland. They primarily are known for their high performance competition AR-15 clones called UR-15.

Uronen Precision was founded by Hannu Uronen. Hannu Uronen, known for his success as a competitive shooter in both trap and practical disciplines, drew significant influence from his time spent in the United States, where he refined his expertise in practical and action shooting. Upon returning to Finland from the US, he began applying his experience toward gunsmithing, building on the family’s background in firearm craftsmanship.

The Uronen Precision brand was formally launched in 2004, initially focusing on competition rifle components and custom work. By approximately 2007, the company had begun manufacturing complete AR-15 style rifles, developing the UR-15 series, which quickly gained a reputation among Finnish sport shooters for their accuracy and customization options. The company utilized in-house production for key components, including receivers, muzzle devices, and gas blocks, while incorporating high-grade match barrels and proprietary trigger mechanisms into their rifles.
