= Ugartechea =

Spanish firearms manufacturer

Armas Ugartechea
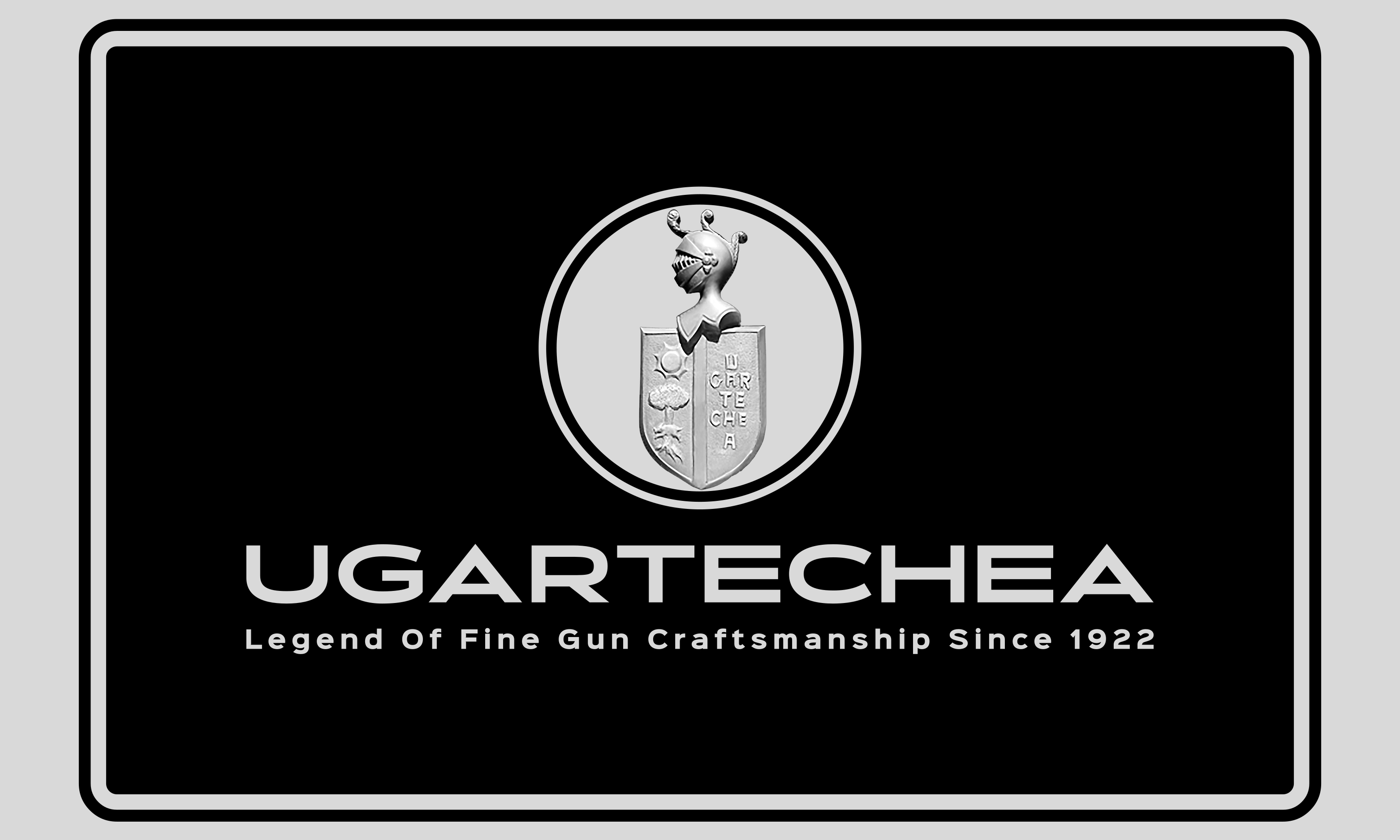
- Type: Private
- Industry: WeaponsFirearms
- Predecessor: Casa Ugartechea
- Founded: 1922 in Eibar, Spain
- Founder: Ignacio Ugartechea
- Successor: Armas Ugartechea
- Headquarters: Eibar, Spain
- Area served: Worldwide
- Products: Double rifles, Bolt-action rifles, Shotguns
- Website: http://www.ugartecheashotguns.com/

Armas Ugartechea is a privately held Basque Spanish firearms manufacturing company located in Eibar that produces rifles and several models of double-barreled shotguns. Its firearms are used worldwide for a variety of sporting and hunting purposes. It was the first Spanish company to start making under and over barrel guns. It is one of the few gunmakers to produce its own barrels. At present, Armas Ugartechea sells its guns worldwide. The company remains privately held as part of a venture capital group.

== History ==
Armas Ugartechea was founded by D. Ignacio Ugartechea in 1922. There have been three Ignacio Ugartechea in the history of the company: Founder, son and grandson. The first Ignacio named his company Casa Ugartechea and it settled in La Bidebarrieta, the first of the several locations that the company occupied as it grew and diversified. After a few years, he moved to Eibar in San Agustín Kalea, and finally to Txonta Kalea, No. 26, where it is currently located. In addition to shotguns, Armas Ugartechea once made rifles and pistols. However, the firm is most famous for its side-by-side double-barreled shotgun, and at some point stopped manufacturing the over/under double-barreled shotgun configuration. The change in the product was due in part to several different factors. After World War II, the international demand for sporting shotguns increased while the demand for pistols and rifles decreased. More importantly, Ignacio Ugartechea in the early days made the Model 1031 Número 6 side by side shotgun to ex-president of Mexico General Álvaro Obregón, also double rifle an 8x65R Brenneke, for the Caudillo himself in 1943, Generalissimo Francisco Franco and then Armas Ugartechea was passed on to the first Ignacio's son.

One of the most famous guns was the first boxlock action, which was a hammerless action of a type commonly used in double barrelled shotguns. The boxlock action uses concealed, self-cocking hammers in a break-open action. It was strongly opposed by most sportsmen and manufacturers at first but became the dominant form of double barrelled shotgun action.

In 1928 they granted the trademark EL CASCO and requested registration of an industrial drawing to make a specialized shotgun catalog. In the census carried out in 1929, Ignacio Ugartechea appears as a manufacturer of shotguns and pistols for the "San Humberto" brand to distinguish all kinds of short and long arms, obtaining in 1933 patent no. 129218 defined as "overlapping barrels for hunting shotguns joined and aligned by means of flat surfaces” and number 131047 for “a hidden key system for hunting shotguns, equipped with a safety interposition of another piece in advance of the firing pin that prevents the weapon from being fired accidentally”. Other Models like the “Sport” model the light shotgun and the “Chirri” as a heavy pigeon-shooting weapon. Ignacio Ugartechea played a key role in commercializing semi-automatic pistols from Gabilondo y Cia. and Tomas de Urizar y Cia., using his own trademarks, based on the model Rubi the “Iñaki”. He also introduced revolvers made by Olave Solozabal y Cia., branded as "El Casco", the Royale pistol and mini pistols, all crafted by Ignacio Ugartechea in Eibar, for Manufacture d'Armes de Précision (MAP)in Hendaye and St. Etienne, France—both prominent centers of firearm production. His contributions helped expand the presence of Spanish firearms in the international market, particularly in France, where the Ruby pistol became widely used, especially during World War I.

In 1933 Casa Ugartechea became the first Spanish company to be licensed to produce express rifles in Spain as large as .400, .450, .500, .577 and .600 Nitro Express. The company made the .45 caliber semiautomatic pistol in 1926 with a patent in his name No. 97164 for a type of 2-shot central percussion pistol.

The second Ignacio Ugartechea was trained in the tradition of gun making at the prestigious Escuela de Armeria in Eibar. At one point, he was known as one of the most prominent hunter in Spain and Europe, developing a relationship and participating in social hunts with the likes of the king of Spain, Juan Carlos I.

Armas Ugartechea builds guns based on designs and patents originating from London and Birmingham firms such as Holland & Holland and Westley Richards. When shotgun-making was in its heyday in the late nineteenth century, patents were only granted for fourteen years. After that period, advancements like the Anson & Deeley boxlock action were reproduced all over the world. When a patent that seemed efficient and easy to reproduce became available, it was not uncommon for Basque shotgun makers to reproduce it with local components, and market it as a less-expensive alternative to the English offerings like the 600 Deluxe Series marketed by Parker-Hale a British firearms manufacturer.

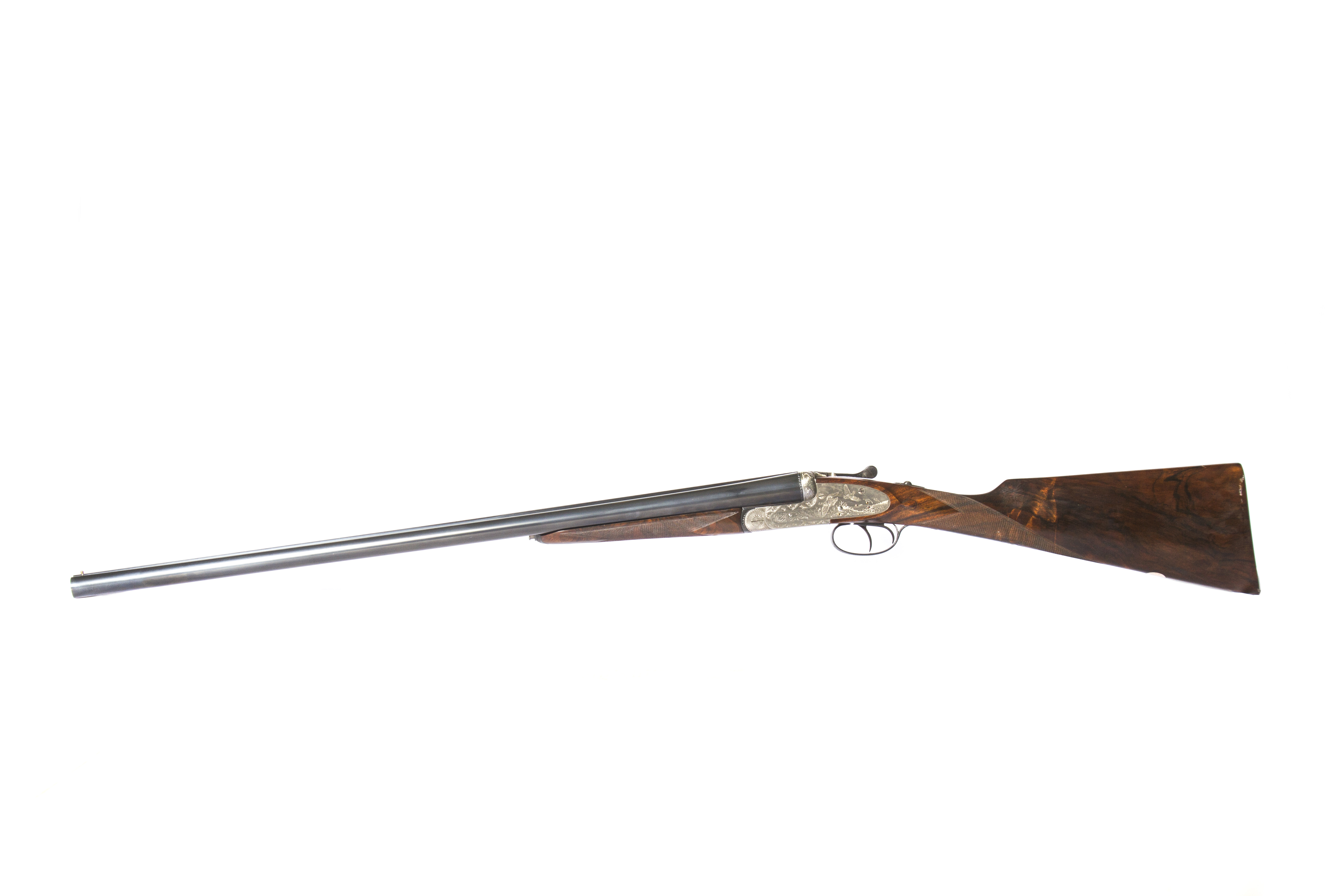
Ugartechea Model 2000

== Further Changes ==
Armas Ugartechea originally made matched pairs of sidelocks guns for export to England. In a sidelock action, the mechanism that makes the gun function can be removed and reinserted fairly easily. At that time, the shooting of driven pheasant and partridge at large English country houses; and pigeons in Spanish pigeon rings; was very popular. These shooting sports required shotguns that could be repaired in the field. Ugartechea was the first to manufacture superimposed shotguns. He makes his own shotgun overlaid in caliber 410, a caprice that many would have wanted for themselves. Many people are still interested in this shotgun This made the sidelock very desirable (and expensive), and selling the sidelock action became a clear priority. Famous gun owners have included Ernest Hemingway with the model Dixon-Falcon among other notable clients.

Eventually, the sidelock fad passed, and the simpler, less expensive boxlock action gained popularity. Driven shooting and pigeon rings became increasingly inaccessible, and sidelocks came to be viewed more as luxury items—especially in the rapidly growing American market after World War II. In the United States, consumers sought shotguns with the features of traditional English models but without the steep price tag.

Until this shift, Armas Ugartechea had primarily focused on sidelock shotguns, producing boxlocks mainly as lower-end offerings. However, recognizing the change in market demand, the company redirected its efforts toward refining and expanding its boxlock line, targeting exports to the United States and England.

This transition aligned with traditions of the Birmingham gunmaking industry, particularly through Armas Ugartechea’s early 1960s collaboration with the Parker-Hale Arms Company on sporting rifles and shotguns. During the 1980s and 1990s, Parker-Hale’s Series 600 collaboration with Armas Ugartechea was part of a broader strategy to diversify its firearms offerings. This partnership, centered at the Ignacio Ugartechea factory in Eibar, Spain, continued the production of the Series 600, 700, and 800 shotguns, along with a number of rifles known for their accuracy, reliability, and affordability.

The collaboration allowed Parker-Hale to broaden its catalog, offering well-crafted firearms that appealed to both sporting enthusiasts and professional shooters. These jointly produced firearms maintained the high standards of both brands, combining Ugartechea’s traditional Spanish gunmaking expertise with Parker-Hale’s reputation for precision engineering.

In addition to its sporting and hunting firearms, Armas Ugartechea has recently expanded into the military and law enforcement sectors. This strategic diversification, combined with its long-standing reputation for craftsmanship, has further solidified the company's position within the global firearms industry.

== See also ==
- James Purdey & Sons
- John Rigby & Company
- Westley Richards
