= Gallyon Gun & Rifle Makers =

British gunmaker

Gallyon Gun & Rifle Makers Ltd
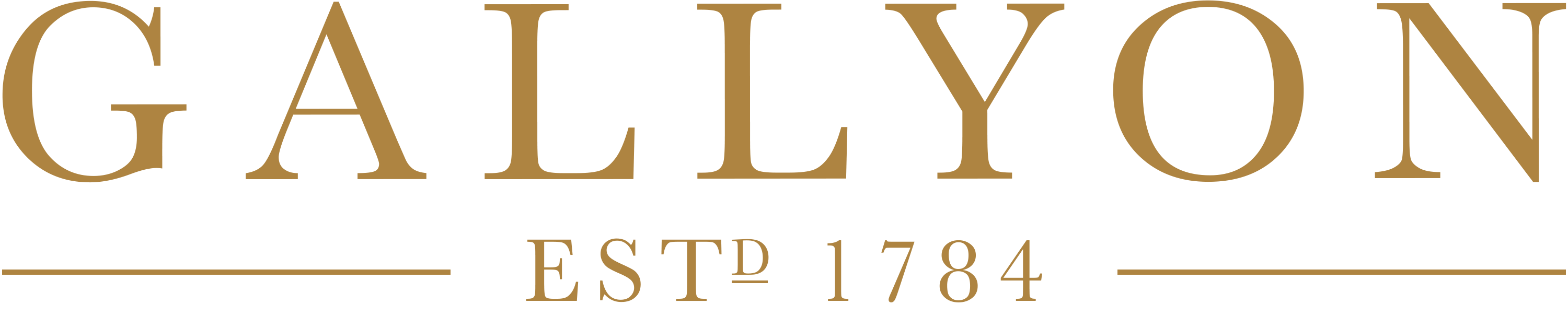
- Company type: Private
- Traded as: Gallyon Gun & Rifle Makers
- Industry: Gun manufacturer
- Predecessor: Gallyon & Sons
- Founded: 1784; 242 years ago
- Founder: William Gallyon (1758-1838)
- Fate: Active
- Headquarters: St Neots, Cambridgeshire, England
- Products: Shotguns & Rifles
- Website: www.gallyon.com

Gallyon Gun & Rifle Makers Ltd (formerly known as Gallyon & Sons) is a British gunmaker currently based in St Neots, Cambridgeshire, England, which offers bespoke sporting shotguns and rifles.

The company was established by William Gallyon in Cambridge, in 1784.^{[3]} Gallyon Gun & Rifle Makers is a member of the Heritage Crafts and held several Royal Warrants.

== History ==
Gun making by the Gallyon family began in the late 1700s when William Gallyon [1758-1838] a descendant of a family of glaziers, was apprenticed to John Henshaw, a well-known London trained gunmaker. Henshaw completed his training in London and became a member of the Worshipful Company of Gunmakers, a London Guild, and became a Freeman of the City of London. Henshaw worked and traded in London before moving to Cambridge around 1746.

In 1784 William Gallyon had left the employment of John Henshaw and had established his own gun making business in Cambridge. John Henshaw died on 7 February 1796 and within his will & testament, he directed his kinsman, James Henshaw, an ironmonger from London, to sell and dispose of the business, along with all the stock in trade and working goods; these were bought by William Gallyon. In 1939 Gallyon & Sons bought the business of Lionel Clough based in King's Lynn, a business which had its origins in 1800 with M. Spencer, gunmaker. In 1860 the business was sold and transferred to J.M. Boreham, and then 10 years later to John Young's Potter. Potter was an extremely fine craftsman who made very good 12 and 16 bore game guns and larger bore fowling pieces having apprenticed with Harris Holland, which eventually became Holland & Holland.

John Youngs Potter married Sarah Ann Rey at Stepney Baptist Church, Broad Street, Lynn on 3 March 1850. The 1851 census showed that they were staying with his brother Thomas Potter, at Hanover Square in London. This was close to where John Youngs Potter worked for one of the most prestigious gunmakers in England, Harris Holland of Bond Street, London.

== Cambridge: 66 Bridge Street and Further Acquisitions ==
The original location of Gallyon Guns was in Slaughterhouse Lane, Cambridge, which is now known as Corn Exchange Street. In 1868 Gallyon & Sons leased premises at 66 Bridge Street in Cambridge, an address which Gallyon became synonymous with and eventually purchased the property in 1888 from St John's College, Cambridge.

In 1955, Gallyon & Sons of King's Lynn was granted a Royal Warrant of appointment to Queen Elizabeth II, having previously held those for kings Edward VII, George V and George VI.

On 1 April 1951, Gallyon & Sons purchased the business of Charles Francis, gunmaker of Peterborough. Charles Francis established his gun making business in long causeway, Peterborough, during the early 1800s. The business traded as Charles Francis & Son from 1951 until 1 March 1964, when the company was incorporated and became Gallyon & Sons(Peterborough) Ltd.

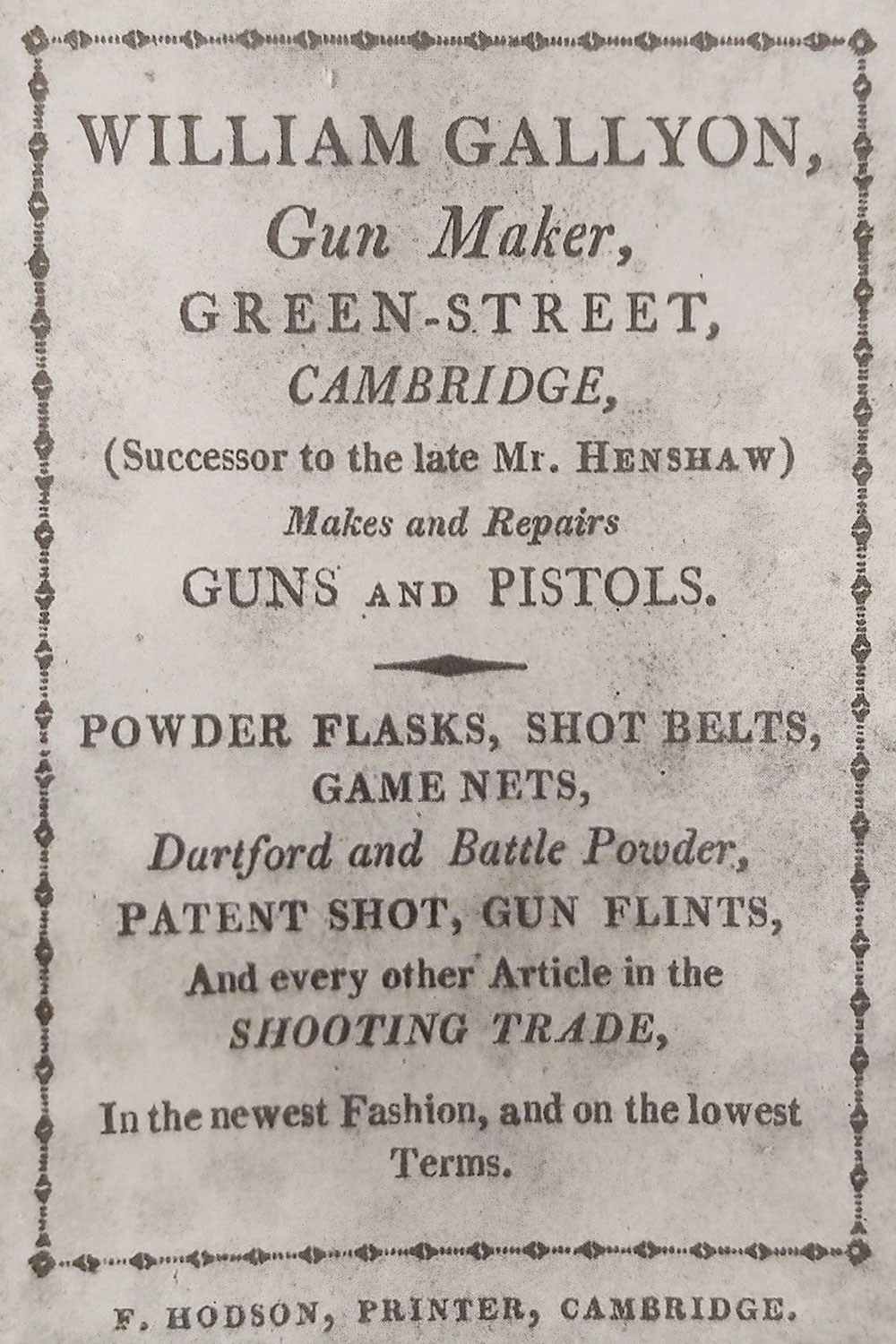
Gallyon trade label: 1796

In 1964, Gallyon & Sons acquired another British gunmaker, C.S. Rosson, from its founder, Charles Stanley Rosson.

In 1906 Charles Stanley Rosson came to Norwich from Derby, where he, his father and older brother had worked as gunmakers. Charles purchased an old established gunmaking business from Cartwright & Wilson, and quickly built up a reputation for very high-quality guns, that were valued and exported worldwide. Situated originally on the corner of ‘Rampant Horse Street’, a location which was unfortunately bombed and destroyed during the Second World War, with the loss of the historical C S Rosson gun ledgers.

Gallyon temporarily took over what remained of the business after the bombing as an act of kindness to Charles, offering to ‘Caretaker’ the business until Charles was able to take back the running of the business. Gallyon returned the business back to C.S. Rosson in 1947, which was then re-established in ‘White Lion Street’, Norwich.

After the Second World War and with the loss of the original archival gun records, the first recorded gun in the new ledger was dated 2 February 1946. The gun was given the serial number 4501. Rosson gun records normally show the date which the gun was finished, in some cases this was the date of the final engraving or sale to the customer.

Rosson use several brand names, which denoted the level of quality. The top of its range was Eclipse, followed by Norfolk, County, Expert, Acme and finally Covert. In the early 1950s the business moved to 'Bedford Street' where Charles ran the business until 1956 when he died.

The Rosson business was then sold to Stuart Healy's of London and after three years the business went bankrupt.

The business was then sold at auction to H.P. Darlow, a wholesale arms and ammunition merchant from Bedford. Darlow tried to run the business unsuccessfully from his remote Bedfordshire office, until in November 1964 Gallyon agreed to buy the gunmaking business, with Darlow retaining the cartridge business.

The takeover of the Rosson business was completed on 1 April 1965 and the Rosson name was retained for six months, then in 1966 it was changed to Gallyon & Sons (Norwich) Ltd.

== Modern Day ==
More than 26,000 hand-made bespoke sporting guns have been manufactured by Gallyon & Sons of East Anglia since the company’s foundation in 1784 up to 2017. Gallyon is the oldest British gunmaking firm and still retains Richard Gallyon as a brand ambassador.

In 2017, Quiller Press published a limited edition of "Gallyon and Sons: Gunmakers of East Anglia", a book written by Richard Gallyon and Wendy Trott about the history of Gallyon Guns.

In 2019 Richard Gallyon looked to retire from the family firm and sold the business to a close family friend, Richard Hefford-Hobbs, and his business partner Adam Anthony.

In 2022 Gallyon was featured on the cover of Field Magazine the UK’s premier field sport publication established in 1853 and the US premier tile Shooting Sportsman a first for any gun manufacturer to feature on both in the same year.

Gallyon enjoys a strong relationship with the 8th Earl of Leicester who spoke on the great history of the sport and partnership:

"The Holkham Estate and Gallyon share a longstanding East Anglian heritage. Holkham is widely acknowledged as the home of driven gameshooting in Britain, while Gallyon guns have been shot on our estate since the late 1780s."

== Range ==
The current Gallyon range consists of 3 game guns, The Cambridge Plain Action, The Cambridge Engraved (engraved action, upgraded stock, and a silver oval) and The Holkham a premium, side-plated game gun that encapsulates the finest traditions of bespoke British gunmaking.

All Gallyon gun components, including the barrels are made in-house in Cambridgeshire to the uncompromising standards of the Formula One, Aerospace and Medical Industries. All parts are made to an extremely high level of precision, some down to micron levels, every part has been subjected to extensive Failure Mode and Effect Analysis (FMEA), a process developed to analyse potential failure modes of military systems.

All parts are then hand craft finished and built into the final gun. Stocking is also undertaken in house with each gun fitted bespoke to each customer, a traditional craft skill.

== See also ==
- Holland & Holland
- James Purdey & Sons
- Westley Richards
- Boss & Co.
