= GİRSAN =

Turkish firearms manufacturer

- Company type: Private
- Industry: Firearms
- Founded: 1993; 33 years ago
- Headquarters: Giresun, Turkey
- Products: Firearms, weapons
- Website: https://girsan.com/

GİRSAN is a Turkish firearm manufacturing company, mainly focused on manufacturing pistols and shotguns. Its firearms are used worldwide by civilians, police and military.

== History ==
GIRSAN Gun Industry was established in Giresun, Turkey in 1993. Factory building located in Giresun Bulancak Industrial Zone on an area of more than 30,000 square meters. GİRSAN products are used by military, police and other government owned authorities. In addition, Girsan delivers their products to more than 55 countries.

== Manufacturing ==
In the United States their distributor; European American Armory imports all Girsan product lines.

== Product line ==
=== Pistols ===
==== Regard Series - Beretta 92 clones ====
- Regard MC
- Regard MC GEN 3
- Regard MC GEN 4
- Compact MC
- MC R9
- MC 39
- Tuğra

==== MC P35 High Power Series - Browning Hi-Power clones ====
- MC P35 High Power

==== MC 1911 Series - Colt 1911 clones ====
Source:

==== MC 28 & MC 9 ====
Source:

==== MC 13 & MC 14 ====
Source:

=== Infantry rifles ===
- MC4 - M4 clone
