= Cosmi Americo & Figlio =

Italian shotgun manufacturer

- Type: Family-owned
- Industry: Arms industry
- Founded: 1890
- Founder: Rodolfo Cosmi
- Headquarters: Ancona, Italy
- Products: Shotguns
- Website: www.cosmi.net

Cosmi Americo & Figlio is an Italian shotgun manufacturer located in Ancona, Italy. The company manufactures semi-automatic shotguns under the name Cosmi. The first gun was completed in 1925, only approximately 7,500 guns have been manufactured since 1930, and individual guns are unique enough that parts are often not interchangeable. Each part is individually serial numbered. The shotgun is available in three calibers (gauges): 12, 16, 20, 28 and .410 bore.
