= Patriot Ordnance Factory =

Weapon manufacturer in Arizona, United States

Patriot Ordnance Factory - POF-USA
- Industry: Firearms
- Founded: 2002; 24 years ago
- Founder: Frank DeSomma
- Headquarters: Phoenix, Arizona, United States
- Area served: Worldwide
- Products: Firearms
- Website: www.pof-usa.com

Patriot Ordnance Factory (POF-USA) manufactures and distributes law enforcement, military and civilian rifles in Phoenix, Arizona, and was the first manufacturer and seller of gas-piston-operated weapon systems on AR-style rifles in the United States.

== History ==
POF-USA was founded in 2002 by aerospace engineer Frank DeSomma with the intent of solving two common problems with gas impingement systems in dusty conditions found with the traditional AR-15 which are carbon fouling and a short-barreled timing issue.

== Innovations ==
To address carbon fouling and a short-barreled timing issue related to traditional AR-15s, POF-USA developed the Regulated Short-Stroke Gas Piston System. Rather than operating gas being injected directly into the upper receiver like a traditional AR-15, the technology pushes a piston that acts on an operating rod, which acts on the bolt carrier, setting extraction and reloading into motion. This action type offers several significant improvements over the direct impingement method. Because hot gases are not injected into the upper receiver, carbon fouling in the action is virtually eliminated. POF-USA's solution to timing problems related to AR-15's with short gas tubes, POF-USA developed precise op-rod/piston geometry and regulated gas pressure to enable rifles and carbines to be properly timed and bolt speeds (cyclic rates) to be precisely controlled, enhancing extraction and feeding reliability, as well as reducing wear and fatigue on critical components. The gun also runs cooler, further enhancing reliability and safety.

POF-USA rifles feature NP3™ coatings and hard, corrosion resistant, nitride heat-treated barrels and gas blocks, eliminating any requirement for lubrication.

Additional innovations developed by POF-USA include the integral bolt-carrier key with the interface behind the cam pin, oversized heat-sink barrel nut, roller cam pin, and regulating gas plug.
