= Ordtech Military Industries =

Ordtech Military Industries (OMI) is a defense and aerospace company specializing in the design, development, and production of advanced military equipment and aerospace systems. It was established in the 1980s in Greece, with production facilities in Tripoli and Kilkis (as Ordtech Hellas) and in other countries worldwide.

Ordtech Military Industries produces, designs, upgrades and supports a wide range of weapons systems, munitions, aircraft armaments, missile systems, and other technologies. Its products and services include guided munitions, composite propellants, aerial bombs, unmanned military aircraft, launchers and unguided rockets, countermeasures, ordnance and weapons systems for aerial, land, and naval forces.

== See also ==
- List of defense contractors
- Aerospace industry
- Military technology
