= Les Baer =

American firearms manufacturer

Les Baer Custom Inc.
- Company type: Corporation
- Industry: Weapons
- Founded: 1991; 35 years ago
- Founder: Les Baer, Sr
- Headquarters: LeClaire, Iowa, United States
- Area served: Worldwide
- Products: Rifles, pistols
- Website: www.lesbaer.com

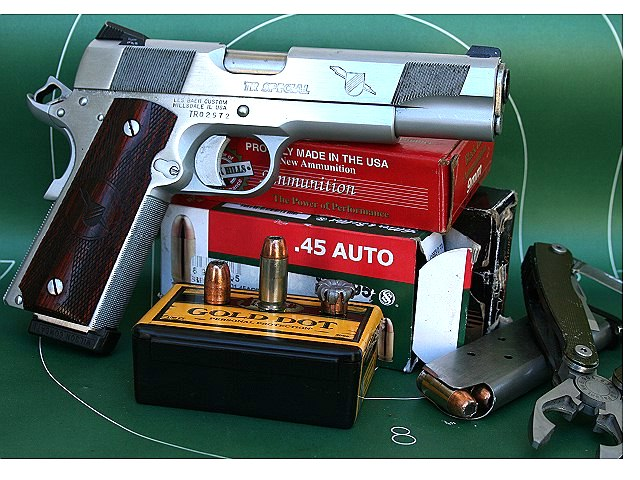
Les Baer Thunder Ranch Special hard chrome plated by Baer

Les Baer Custom Inc. /ˌlɛsˈbɛər/ is an American manufacturer of semi-custom firearms including M1911-pattern pistols and AR-15 type rifles. Les Baer Custom was founded by the gunsmith Les Baer, Sr. in 1991 in Hillsdale, Illinois.

== History ==
Les Baer Custom Inc. was previously located in Hillsdale, Illinois, but moved to LeClaire, Iowa when Illinois started implementing restrictive gun laws.

This company, along with Smith & Wesson was the only pistol manufacturer who had authorization to use and display Clint Smith's Thunder Ranch logo. Les Baer Customs no longer offers a line of pistols and rifles that use the name. When asked for the reason why Les Baer would no longer be making the Thunder Ranch Special, it was attributed to a falling out between Les Baer Customs and Clint Smith. Clint Smith is currently corroborating with Nighthawk Customs producing Thunder Ranch 1911's.

All Les Baer pistols come with a guarantee of at least 3" accuracy at 50 yards, and many models are available at extra cost ($295.00) with a guarantee of 1.5" at the same distance. All rifles are guaranteed to shoot .5 MOA groups, except for the recently introduced Patrolman's Carbine, which is guaranteed to shoot sub-MOA.

Les Baer recommends using the following ammunition in their pistols: Federal Premium Hydra-Shok, Federal American Eagle "ball", and Remington Golden Saber. Les Baer advises against using Winchester "White Box", aluminum-cased ammo, or Russian ammo in their pistols.

== Product lines ==
- M1911 pistols
  - Baer 1911 DCM-Legal National Match Hardball Pistol
  - Baer 1911 Police Pistol Combat Distinguished Match (P.P.C.)
  - Baer 1911 Police Pistol Combat Open Class (P.P.C.)
  - Baer 1911 Premier II 5" Model
  - Baer 1911 Premier II 6" Model
  - Baer 1911 Premier II Super-Tac
  - Baer 1911 Prowler III
  - Baer 1911 Custom Carry
  - Baer 1911 Custom Carry Commanche
  - Baer Ultimate Recon Pistol, 5"
  - Baer 1911 Ultimate Tactical Carry 5" Model
  - Baer 1911 Ultimate Master 5
  - Baer 1911 Ultimate Master 5 with Compensator
  - Baer 1911 Thunder Ranch Special
  - Baer 1911 Thunder Ranch Special Home Defense Pistol With M3 Tactical Illuminator
  - Baer 1911 TR "Commanche" Special
  - Baer 1911 Thunder Ranch Special Engraved Model
  - Baer 1911 Swift Response Pistol (SRP)
  - Baer 1911 Monolith
  - Baer 1911 Monolith Heavyweight
  - Baer 1911 Monolith Tactical Illuminator Model
  - Baer 1911 Monolith Commanche
  - Baer 1911 Monolith Commanche Heavyweight
  - Baer 1911 Stinger Model
  - Baer 1911 Kenai 10mm
  - Baer 1911 Stinger Model Stainless Steel
  - Baer 1911 Concept
    - I
    - II
    - III
    - IV
    - V
    - V 6" Model
    - VI
    - VII Comanche Model
    - VIII Stainless Comanche Model
  - Baer/Busse Combat Package
    - Busse Combat Pistol With Integral Picatinny Rail System And Tactical Light
    - Busse Combat Pistol With Conventional Frame
  - Limited Edition Les Baer Presentation Grade 1911
  - Les Baer Custom 25th Anniversary Model 1911 Pistol Special Collectors' Model
- AR .223 rifles
  - Les Baer Custom Ultimate AR Varmint Model
    - .223 Remington (5.56×45mm NATO)
    - 6.5mm Grendel (6.5×39mm)
  - Les Baer Custom Ultimate AR .223 Super Match Model
  - Les Baer Custom Ultimate AR M4 Flattop Model
    - .223 Remington (5.56×45mm NATO)
    - 6.5mm Grendel (6.5×39mm)
  - Les Baer Custom Ultimate AR .223 M4 Flattop LE Model
  - Les Baer Custom Ultimate AR .223 M4 Flattop LE Camo Model
  - Les Baer Custom Ultimate AR .223 ISPC Action Model
  - Les Baer Custom Thunder Ranch Rifle
  - Les Baer Custom Ultimate CMP Competition Rifle
  - Les Baer Custom Ultimate NRA Match Rifle
  - Les Baer Custom Ultimate AR .223 AR .204 Ruger Super Varmint Model
  - Les Baer Custom Ultimate AR .223 AR .204 Ruger Super Match Model
- 1911-A1/AR-15 sets
  - Thunder Ranch Matched Rifle & Pistol Sets With Matching Serial Numbers
- Bolt action rifles
  - Les Baer Custom Tactical Bolt Action Rifles
    - .243 Winchester
    - .260 Remington
    - .308 Winchester
    - 6.5 X .284 Norma
    - .300 Winchester Magnum (with Enforcer Muzzle Brake)
    - .338 Lapua Magnum (with Enforcer Muzzle Brake)
  - Les Baer Custom Tactical Varmint Classic Bolt Action Rifles
    - .243 Winchester
    - .260 Remington
    - .308 Winchester
    - .300 Winchester Magnum (with Enforcer Muzzle Brake)

Les Baer Custom makes M1911 parts, magazines, grips and presentation cases, and custom work and refinishing services.

== See also ==
- List of modern armament manufacturers
