= Troy Industries =

American firearm manufacturer

Troy Industries, Inc.
- Industry: Firearms; Firearms parts
- Headquarters: Clarksville, Tennessee, United States
- Products: M7A1 carbine
- Website: troyind.com /

Troy Industries, Inc. is an American manufacturer of firearms and firearm parts based in Clarksville, Tennessee. It is the manufacturer of parts on the Smith & Wesson M&P15 and is a United States government contractor. Troy is best known for its rugged, folding battle sights in common use by Colt, Smith & Wesson, and many other large OEM gun manufacturers. Additionally, Troy Industries is known for its M14 rifle parts and its M7A1 carbine, which was reviewed by the United States armed forces when drafting requirements for a replacement of the M4 carbine.

Troy Industries received criticism when its former law enforcement training partnership (Troy Asymmetric) hired Dale Monroe, the partner of former FBI sniper Lon Horiuchi. Upon learning of the hiring practices of Troy Asymmetric, Troy Industries released a public statement, and then quietly parted ways with the training company.

In recent years, Troy Industries relocated to Tennessee and is continuing to develop new products and provide OEM sales and support.
