= Strayer Voigt Inc =

American pistol manufacturer

Strayer Voigt Inc (SVI)
- Company type: Private
- Industry: Firearms
- Founded: 1994; 32 years ago
- Founder: Sandy Strayer
- Headquarters: Gordon, TX, United States
- Key people: Brandon Strayer
- Products: Pistols
- Owner: Sandy Strayer
- Website: http://www.sviguns.com

Strayer-Voigt, Inc. (also known as SVI) is a manufacturer of M1911-styled modular pistols. The Strayer-Voigt system is called modular because the lower grip and trigger guard, which is made of carbon steel, stainless steel, titanium or aluminum, is a separate component from the metal upper portion of the frame that comprises the dust cover and frame rails. They are the most famous for their Hybrid series of pistols as well as their IMM Open division pistols made for competitions. SVI markets its products under the brand name Infinity Firearms. The Infinity pistols are sometimes unofficially known by the combined name of Strayer-Voigt Infinity among some enthusiasts, a play on the SVI acronym.

== History ==
Strayer-Voigt, Inc. was started in June 1994 when Sandy Strayer left STI International Inc to form his own company. Sandy Strayer joined forces with Michael Voigt, a professional shooter and gunsmith, to manufacture and market their own line of modular frame 1911s.

== The new age of 1911s ==
The original polymer grip was formerly a shared patent design between Strayer-Voigt and STI International Inc. It offers a modular version of the M1911 design optimized for competition use. By making the lower half of the frame from thin polymer, the gun can make use of double-stack magazines without a significant increase in grip thickness (current production utilizes various metals for the grip). SVI and STI pistols generally hold approximately twice as many rounds of ammunition per magazine as traditional 1911s (i.e., 14 rounds of .45 ACP instead of 7 rounds). SVI Infinity pistols currently rank among the most popular - and most expensive - competition 1911 pistols made. Complete SVI handguns start at $4,200 (as of 2019) plus the cost of any customizations. They are produced in a variety of calibers, including .38 Super, 9x23mm Winchester, .40 S&W, .45 ACP, 10mm Auto, and .357 Sig. SVI Infinity pistols make exclusive use of Infinity Accuracy Enhanced pistol barrels. The barrels and all major components are manufactured in-house from billet barstock. Heat treatment and cryogenic treatments are also done in-house. SVI also now uses slides with interchangeable breech faces, which makes caliber changes cheaper for customers wanting to shoot several different calibers in the same weapon. SVI provides accuracy certificates with their pistols which feature the accuracy enhanced barrels that produce groups smaller than 40 mm at 50 m (0.8 mrad) or 1.5 in at 50 yd (3 MOA), which is remarkable accuracy for a pistol.
