= United Defense Manufacturing Corporation =

- Type: Private
- Industry: Arms industry
- Founded: 2006
- Headquarters: Parañaque, Philippines
- Products: Firearms
- Website: www.udmc-weapons.com

United Defense Manufacturing Corporation (UDMC) is a Philippine defense contractor and firearms manufacturer based in Parañaque, Philippines. It provides the Philippine National Police, Armed Forces of the Philippines, and Philippine Coast Guard with firearms and other tactical equipment.

The company primarily produces M1911-pattern pistols and AR-15-pattern rifles and carbines, notably producing a gas-piston variant called the Pneumatic Valve and Rod Assault Rifle (PVAR).

== History ==
UDMC was founded by Gene Cariño in 2006.

The company has reported on issues from local procurement laws on firearms procurement for the AFP and the PNP in a Vera Files article in May 2013.

== Deals ==
=== Philippines ===
UDMC has managed to provide assault rifles to the Philippine government. Their clients include the Presidential Security Group and the Philippine Air Force Special Operations Wing. The Philippine Army Marskmen has been using UDMC rifles for international shooting competitions.

=== Myanmar ===
In 2017, UDMC exported its assault rifles to Myanmar. The Justice for Myanmar activist group alleged that this "effectively financed" the Rohingya genocide. However a Gulf News report states that these are rifles used for shooting competitions by the Myanmar Army. UDMC was also falsely attributed to providing arms to the People's Defence Force of the opposition National Unity Government in 2021.

=== S&T Motiv ===
In September 2018, United Defense entered a joint venture with South Korean firm S&T Motiv to manufacture firearms in the Philippines for the Philippine military and police and possibly for clients based overseas. In 2019, UDMC would enter into an agreement with Dasan Machineries to serve as the local representative.
