= Ziegenhahn & Sohn =

German arms manufacturing company

Alfred Ziegenhahn (1875-1946)

Ziegenhahn & Sohn Jagdwaffen e.K. (formerly Ziegenhahn & Diem or Zi-Di) is a German arms manufacturing company. It was founded in 1911 and is located in Benshausen.

Alfred Ziegenhahn, founder of the firm, was born in 1875 in the town of Rotha in the southern part of the Harz mountain range. In 1889 he was apprenticed to Messrs. Schmidt & Habermann in Suhl, remaining with them and eventually being appointed as master gunsmith in 1922. Ziegenhahn's consuming interest in arms led to his making of rifles in his home workshop and creating ideas which could be patented. His collaboration with Messrs. Heinrich Diem in Benshausen started in 1911, at which time the combination 'Ziegenhahn-Diem' led to the name 'Zi-Di'.

Alfred’s son, Fritz (born 1903), was likewise apprenticed to Schmidt & Habermann between 1917 and 1920, becoming a master gunsmith in 1933. Ten years earlier in 1923 Alfred Ziegenhahn broke his ties with Schmidt & Habermann and started up on his own, Fritz joining him.

One of their first large contracts was the conversion of 30,000 Luger pistols from 7.65mm to 9mm for the German Reichswehr Army of the Weimar Republic.

After World War II, American troops destroyed the company's entire inventory of weapons, running them over with trucks, and dumped all its ammunition in Switzerland. (The ammunition was later recovered.) Banned from arms production, the company produced saw blades until 1952, when it was allowed to produce arms again. The company produced only pistols until 1981, when it resumed production of long arms.

Ziegenhahn & Diem was renamed Ziegenhahn & Sohn oHG in 1993, then subsequently renamed Ziegenhahn & Sohn Jagdwaffen e.K. in 2012.
