= List of firearms (A) =

This is a list of small arms whose manufacturer or name (in the case of no known or multiple manufacturers) starts with the letter A—including pistols, shotguns, sniper rifles, submachine guns, personal defense weapons, assault rifles, battle rifles, designated marksman rifles, carbines, machine guns, flamethrowers, multiple-barrel firearms, grenade launchers, anti-tank rifles, and any other variants.

== List ==
- A. Uberti, Srl.
- Revolvers
- 1873 Buntline Target (Italian Republic – A. Uberti, Srl. – unknown date – single-action revolver – .357 Magnum, .45 Colt:Italian variant of the American Colt Buntline Special.)
- 1873 Buntline Target LBR (Italian Republic – A. Uberti, Srl. – unknown date – single-action revolver – .357 Magnum, .45 Colt: Variant of the 1873 Brtline Target designed to be legal in the United Kingdom of Great Britain and Northern Ireland. Features a longer 20-inch barrel.)
- AAI Corporation
- Launchers
- M203(US – AAI Corporation – 1967–1968 – single-shot underslung grenade launcher – 40×46 mm Grenade Grenade: American grenade launcher designed for use with the Colt M16 rifle and its variants. Entered service with the United States Armed Forces in 1969.)
- M203 DAX(Us – AAI Corporation – unknown date – single-shot underslung grenade launcher – 40×46 mm Grenade: Variant of the M203. Features a double-action trigger and a longer breech opening to accommodate less-lethal ammunition.)
- M203A1 (Us – AAI Corporation – Early 1990s – single-shot underslung grenade launcher – 40×46 mm Grenade: Variant of the M203 designed for use with the Colt M4 rifle and its variants. Features a new special mounting system.)
- M203A1 SOPMOD(US– AAI Corporation, United States Special Operations Command – 1983–2001 – single-shot underslung grenade launcher – 40×46 mm grenade: variant of the M203A1 designed for use with the SOPMOD accessory system for rifles used by the United States Special Operations Command. Features a shorter 9-inch barrel.)
- M203A2 (US– AAI Corporation – 2008 – single-shot underslung grenade launcher – 40×46 mm Grenade: Variant of the M203 grenade launcher designed for use with Colt M16A4 assault rifles and Colt M4 carbines. Can also be used with M16A2 MWS assault rifles. Features the capability of using rangefinding optics.)
- M203PI (US – AAI Corporation – unknown date – single-shot underslung grenade launcher – 40×46 mm grenade: Variant of the M203 designed for use with rifles other than the Colt M16 and Colt M4, such as the Steyr AUG assault rifle, Heckler & Koch G3 battle rifle, and Heckler & Koch MP5 submachine gun.)
- Rifles
- AAI SBR (US – AAI Corporation – 1970s – assault rifle – 4.32×45 mm:Designed for the United States Armed Forces' Future Rifle Program, which aimed to replace the Colt M16 rifles in service with the United States Armed Forces at that time. Never adopted by any military. Prototypes only.)
- AAI XM70 (US– AAI Corporation – unknown date – assault rifle – 5.56×45 mm Fléchette:Designed as a possible entry into the United States Armed Forces' Future Rifle Program, which aimed to replace the colt M16 rifles in service with the United States Armed Forces at that time.The AAI SBR was chosen as an entry instead due to high production cost and failures during testing. Prototype only.)
- Accuracy International
- Rifles
- Accuracy International AS50(United Kingdom of Great Britain and Northern Ireland – Accuracy International – 2007 – semi-automatic anti-materiel rifle – .50 BMG: Designed for use with the British Armed Forces and the United States Navy SEALs.)
- Accuracy International Precision Marksman/Accuracy International PM (United Kingdom of Great Britain and Northern Ireland – Accuracy International – 1982 – bolt-action sniper rifle – 7.62×51 mm NATO, .308 Winchester: Designed to replace the L42A1 bolt-action sniper rifles in service with the British Armed Forces. Designated the L96A1 by the British Armed Forces.)
- Accuracy International Arctic Warfare/Accuracy International AW(United Kingdom of Great Britain and Northern Ireland – Accuracy International – 1988–1991 –bolt-action sniper rifle– 7.62×51 mm NATO,.308 Winchester: Upgraded variant of the Accuracy International Precision Marksman bolt-action sniper rifle. Features increased reliability, especially in arctic conditions, and an enlarged stockhole, bolt handle, magazine release, and trigger guard. Designated the L118A1 by the British Armed forces, and the Psg 90 by the Swedish Armed Forces.)
- Accuracy International Accuracy Enforcement/Accuracy International AE (United Kingdom of Great Britain and Northern Ireland – Accuracy International – 2001 – bolt-action sniper rifle – 7.62×51 mm NATO: Simplified variant of the Accuracy International Arctic Warfare bolt-action sniper rifle designed for use with law enforcement. Features a shorter 24-inch barrel.)
- Accuracy International Accuracy Enforcement MkIII/Accuracy International AE MkIII (United Kingdom of Great Britain and Northern Ireland – Accuracy International – 2009 – bolt-action sniper rifle – 7.62×51 mm NATO: Upgraded variant of the Accuracy International Accuracy Enforcement bolt-action sniper rifle. Features a removable trigger group and a screw-adjustable cheekpiece.)
- Accuracy International Arctic Warfare .50/Accuracy International AW50(United Kingdom of Great Britain and Northern Ireland – Accuracy International – 2000 – bolt-action anti-materiel rifle – .50 BMG: Variant of the Accuracy International Arctic Warfare bolt-action sniper rifle redesigned to be used as an anti-materiel rifle. Designated the G24 by the Bundeswehr.)
- Accuracy International Arctic Warfare .50 Folding/Accuracy International AW50F(United Kingdom of Great Britain and Northern Ireland – Accuracy International – 2000 – bolt-action anti-materiel rifle – .50 BMG: Variant of the Accuracy International Arctic Warfare .50 bolt-action anti-materiel rifle. Features a folding stock. Designated the L121A1 by the British Armed Forces.)
- Accuracy International Arctic Warfare Folding/Accuracy International AWF (United Kingdom of Great Britain and Northern Ireland – Accuracy International – 2001 – bolt-action sniper rifle – 7.62×51 mm NATO, .308 Winchester: Variant of the Accuracy International Arctic Warfare. Features a side-folding polymer stock.)
- Accuracy International Arctic Warfare Magnum/Accuracy International AWM (United Kingdom of Great Britain and Northern Ireland – Accuracy International – 1996 – bolt-action sniper rifle – .300 Winchester Magnum, .338 Lapua Magnum: Variant of the Accuracy International Arctic Warfare bolt-action sniper rifle designed for use with magnum rifle cartridge chamberings.)
- Accuracy International Arctic Warfare Magnum Folding/Accuracy International AWM-F (United Kingdom of Great Britain and Northern Ireland – Accuracy International – 2001 – bolt-action sniper rifle – .300 Winchester Magnum, .338 Lapua Magnum: Variant of the Accuracy International Arctic Warfare Magnum bolt-action sniper rifle. Features a folding stock.)
- Accuracy International Arctic Warfare Police/Accuracy International AWP (United Kingdom of Great Britain and Northern Ireland – Accuracy International – 1997 – bolt-action sniper rifle – .243 Winchester, 7.62×51 mm NATO, .308 Winchester: Variant of the Accuracy International Arctic Warfare bolt-action sniper rifle designed for use with law enforcement agencies rather than militaries. Features a shorter 24-inch barrel and black frame.)
- Accuracy International Arctic Warfare Suppressed/Accuracy International AWS (United Kingdom of Great Britain and Northern Ireland – Accuracy International – 1998 – bolt-action sniper rifle – 7.62×51 mm NATO, .308 Winchester: Variant of the Accuracy International Arctic Warfare bolt-action sniper rifle designed for use with subsonic ammunition. Features an integral suppressor and a 16-inch barrel.)
- Accuracy International Arctic Warfare Covert/Accuracy International AWC (United Kingdom of Great Britain and Northern Ireland – Accuracy International – 2002 – bolt-action sniper rifle – 7.62×51 mm NATO, .308 Winchester: Variant of the Accuracy International Arctic Warfare Suppressed bolt-action sniper rifle. Features a folding stock and a 12-inch barrel.)
- Accuracy International AX338MC(United Kingdom of Great Britain and Northern Ireland – Accuracy International – 2010 – bolt-action sniper rifle: Variant of the Accuracy International Arctic Warfare bolt-action sniper rifle designed in part for the United States Special Operations Command Precision Sniper Rifle program. Features a more modular design than the Arctic Warfare.)
- Accuracy International Accuracy Tactical/Accuracy International AT(United Kingdom of Great Britain and Northern Ireland – Accuracy International – 2014 – bolt-action sniper rifle – 7.62×51 mm NATO: Cheaper, simpler variant of the British Accuracy International AX338MC bolt-action sniper rifle designed for the law enforcement and civilian markets.)
- Accuracy International AX50MC(United Kingdom of Great Britain and Northern Ireland – Accuracy International – unknown date – bolt-action anti-materiel rifle – .50 BMG:Variant of the Accuracy International AX338MC bolt-action sniper rifle. Features a bolt diameter of 30 mm.)
- Accuracy International AX308MC(United Kingdom of Great Britain and Northern Ireland – Accuracy International – unknown date – bolt-action sniper rifle – 7.62×51 mm NATO: Variant of the Accuracy International AX338MC bolt-action sniper rifle. Features a bolt diameter of 20 mm.)
- Advanced Armament Corporation
- Personal Defense Weapons
- AAC Honey Badger (United States – Advanced Armament Corporation – 2011 – Personal Defense Weapon – 300 AAC Blackout: American personal defense weapon based on the American AR-15. Comes in two variants, a fully automatic variant for military markets, and a semi-automatic variant for civilian markets.)
- Aeroknox
  - Aeroknox XM556(US – machine gun – 5.56×45 mm NATO)
- Afanasyev machine gun(Soviet Union – machine gun – 7.62x54mmR: prototype)
- Akdal Arms
- Pistols
- Akdal Ghost TR-01 (Republic of Turkey – Akdal Arms – 1990 – semi-automatic pistol – 9×19 mm Parabellum: Turkish semi-automatic pistol with many similarities to the Austrian semi-automatic Glock 17 pistol.)
- Shotguns
- Akdal MKA 1919 (Republic of Turkey – Akdal Arms – 2006 – semi-automatic shotgun – 12 Gauge: Turkish semi-automatic shotgun that resembles the American Colt M16 assault rifle.)
- ALFA-PROJ
- Pistols
- ALFA Combat(Czech Republic – ALFA-PROJ – 2003 – semi-automatic pistol – 9×19 mm Parabellum,.40 S&W,.45 ACP: Semi-automatic pistol manufactured by ALFA-PROJ. Chambered in either 9×19 mm Parabellum, .40 S&W, or .45 ACP.)
- ALFA Defender(Czech Republic – ALFA-PROJ – 2002 – Compact semi-automatic pistol – 9×19 mm Parabellum, .40 S&W, .45 ACP: Compact semi-automatic pistol manufactured by ALFA-PROJ. Chambered in either 9×19 mm Parabellum, .40 S&W, or .45 ACP.)
- Revolvers
- ALFA-PROJ Series ALFA (Czech Republic – ALFA-PROJ – unknown date – double-action revolvers – .357 S&W Magnum: Series of Czech revolvers designed for use with law enforcement agencies, private security agencies, personal security units, and hunters.)
- ALFA-PROJ Model 3520(Czech Republic – ALFA-PROJ – unknown date – compact double-action revolver – .357 S&W Magnum: compact-length model of the Czech Series ALFA series of double-action revolvers. Features a 2-inch-long barrel and fixed sights.)
- ALFA-PROJ Model 3530(Czech Republic –ALFA-PROJ– unknown date –double-action revolver– .357 S&W Magnum:Full-length model of the Czech Series ALFA series of double-action revolvers. Features a 3-inch-long barrel and fixed sights.)
- ALFA-PROJ Model 3531(Czech Republic – ALFA-PROJ – unknown date – double-action revolver – .357 S&W Magnum: Variant of the Czech ALFA-PROJ Model 3530 double-action revolver. Features a new finish, and new front and adjustable rear sights.)
- ALFA-PROJ Model 3540(Czech Republic – ALFA-PROJ – unknown date – double-action revolver – .357 S&W Magnum: Full-length model of the Czech Series ALFA series of double-action revolvers. Features a 4-inch-long barrel and fixed sights.)
- ALFA-PROJ Model 3541(Czech Republic – ALFA-PROJ – unknown date – double-action revolver – .357 S&W Magnum: Variant of the Czech ALFA-PROJ Model 3540 double-action revolver. Features new front and adjustable rear sights.)
- ALFA-PROJ Model 3561(Czech Republic – ALFA-PROJ – unknown date – double-action revolver – .357 S&W Magnum: Long-barreled model of the Czech Series ALFA series of double-action revolvers. Features a 6-inch-long barrel and new front and adjustable rear sights.)
- ALFA-PROJ Model 3563 Sport (Czech Republic – ALFA-PROJ – unknown date – double-action revolver – .357 S&W Magnum: Sporting model of the Czech Series ALFA series of double-action revolvers. Features a 6-inch-long barrel and LPA sights.)
- Series ALFA Steel(Czech Republic –ALFA-PROJ– unknown date – double-action revolver – 9×19 mm Parabellum, .357 S&W Magnum)
- .22 Long Rifle Models(Czech Republic – ALFA-PROJ – unknown date – double-action revolvers – .22 Long Rifle)
- ALFA-PROJ Model 2230(Czech Republic – ALFA-PROJ – unknown date – double-action revolver – .22 Long Rifle: Full-length model of the Czech Series ALFA Steel series of double-action revolvers chambered in .22 Long Rifle. Features a 3-inch-long barrel and fixed sights.)
- ALFA-PROJ Model 2231(Czech Republic – ALFA-PROJ – unknown date – double-action revolver – .22 Long Rifle: Variant of the Czech ALFA-PROJ Model 2230 double-action revolver. Features new front and adjustable rear sights.)
- ALFA-PROJ Model 2241 (Czech Republic – ALFA-PROJ – unknown date – double-action revolver – .22 Long Rifle: Full-length model of the Czech Series ALFA Steel series of double-action revolvers chambered in .22 Long Rifle. Features a 4-inch-long barrel and adjustable rear sights.)
- ALFA-PROJ Model 2261(Czech Republic – ALFA-PROJ – unknown date – double-action revolver – .22 Long Rifle:Long-barreled model of the Czech Series ALFA Steel series of double-action revolvers chambered in .22 Long Rifle. Features a 6-inch-long barrel and adjustable rear sights.)
- ALFA-PROJ Model 2263 Sport (Czech Republic – ALFA-PROJ – unknown date – double-action revolver – .22 Long Rifle: Sporting model of the Czech Series ALFA Steel series of double-action revolvers chambered in .22 Long Rifle. Features a 6-inch-long barrel, LPA sights, and has a 6-round cylinder capacity rather than the 9-round cylinder that the other models have.)
- .22 Winchester Magnum Rimfire Models (Czech Republic–ALFA-PROJ – unknown date – double-action revolvers – .22 Winchester Magnum Rimfire)
- ALFA-PROJ Model 2330(Czech Republic – ALFA-PROJ – unknown date – double-action revolver – .22 Winchester Magnum Rimfire: Full-length model of the Czech Series ALFA Steel series of double-action revolvers chambered in .22 Winchester Magnum Rimfire. Features a 3-inch-long barrel and fixed sights.)
- ALFA-PROJ Model 2331(Czech Republic – ALFA-PROJ – unknown date – double-action revolver – .22 Winchester Magnum Rimfire: Variant of the Czech ALFA-PROJ Model 2330 double-action revolver. Features new front and adjustable rear sights.)
- ALFA-PROJ Model 2341(Czech Republic – ALFA-PROJ – unknown date – double-action revolver – .22 Winchester Magnum Rimfire: Full-length model of the Czech Series ALFA Steel series of double-action revolvers chambered in .22 Winchester Magnum Rimfire. Features a 4-inch-long barrel and adjustable rear sights.)
- ALFA-PROJ Model 2361(Czech Republic – ALFA-PROJ – unknown date – double-action revolver – .22 Winchester Magnum Rimfire: Long-barreled model of the Czech Series ALFA Steel series of double-action revolvers chambered in .22 Winchester Magnum Rimfire. Features a 6-inch-long barrel and adjustable rear sights.)
- ALFA-PROJ Model 2363 Sport (Czech Republic – ALFA-PROJ – unknown date – double-action revolver – .22 Winchester Magnum Rimfire:Sporting model of the Czech Series ALFA Steel series of double-action revolvers chambered in .22 Winchester Magnum Rimfire. Features a 6-inch-long barrel, LPA sights, and has a 6-round cylinder capacity rather than the 8-round cylinder that the other models have.)
- .32 S&W Models (Czech Republic – ALFA-PROJ – unknown date – double-action revolvers – .32 S&W)
- ALFA-PROJ Model 3220(Czech Republic – ALFA-PROJ – unknown date – compact double-action revolver – .32 S&W: compact-length model of the Czech Series ALFA Steel series of double-action revolvers chambered in .32 S&W. Features a 2-inch-long barrel and fixed sights.)
- ALFA-PROJ Model 3230(Czech Republic – ALFA-PROJ – unknown date – double-action revolver – .32 S&W:Full-length model of the Czech Series ALFA Steel series of double-action revolvers chambered in .32 S&W. Features a 3-inch-long barrel and fixed sights.)
- ALFA-PROJ Model 3231(Czech Republic – ALFA-PROJ – unknown date – double-action revolver – .32 S&W:Variant of the Czech ALFA-PROJ Model 3230 double-action revolver. Features new front and adjustable rear sights.)
- ALFA-PROJ Model 3241(Czech Republic – ALFA-PROJ – unknown date – double-action revolver – .32 S&W: Full-length model of the Czech Series ALFA Steel series of double-action revolvers chambered in .32 S&W. Features a 4-inch-long barrel and adjustable rear sights.)
- ALFA-PROJ Model 3261(Czech Republic – ALFA-PROJ – unknown date – double-action revolver – .32 S&W: Long-barreled model of the Czech Series ALFA Steel series of double-action revolvers chambered in .32 S&W. Features a 6-inch-long barrel and adjustable rear sights.)
- ALFA-PROJ Model 3263 Sport (Czech Republic – ALFA-PROJ – unknown date – double-action revolver – .32 S&W:Sporting model of the Czech Series ALFA Steel series of double-action revolvers chambered in .32 S&W. Features a 6-inch-long barrel and LPA sights.)
- .38 Smith & Wesson Special Models (Czech Republic – ALFA-PROJ – unknown date – double-action revolvers – .38 Smith & Wesson Special)
- ALFA-PROJ Model 3820(Czech Republic – ALFA-PROJ – unknown date – compact double-action revolver – .38 Smith & Wesson Special: compact-length model of the Czech Series ALFA Steel series of double-action revolvers chambered in .38 Smith & Wesson Special. Features a 2-inch-long barrel and fixed sights.)
- ALFA-PROJ Model 3830(Czech Republic – ALFA-PROJ – unknown date – double-action revolver – .38 Smith & Wesson Special: Full-length model of the Czech Series ALFA Steel series of double-action revolvers chambered in .38 Smith & Wesson Special. Features a 3-inch-long barrel and fixed sights.)
- ALFA-PROJ Model 3831(Czech Republic – ALFA-PROJ – unknown date – double-action revolver – .38 Smith & Wesson Special: Variant of the Czech ALFA-PROJ Model 3830 double-action revolver. Features new front and adjustable rear sights.)
- ALFA-PROJ Model 3840(Czech Republic – ALFA-PROJ – unknown date – double-action revolver – .38 Smith & Wesson Special: Full-length model of the Czech Series ALFA Steel series of double-action revolvers chambered in .38 Smith & Wesson Special. Features a 4-inch-long barrel and fixed sights.)
- ALFA-PROJ Model 3841(Czech Republic – ALFA-PROJ – unknown date – double-action revolver – .38 Smith & Wesson Special: Variant of the Czech ALFA-PROJ Model 3840 double-action revolver. Features new front and adjustable rear sights.)
- ALFA-PROJ Model 3861(Czech Republic – ALFA-PROJ – unknown date – double-action revolver – .38 Smith & Wesson Special: Long-barreled model of the Czech Series ALFA Steel series of double-action revolvers chambered in .38 Smith & Wesson Special. Features a 6-inch-long barrel and adjustable rear sights.)
- ALFA-PROJ Model 3863 Sport (Czech Republic – ALFA-PROJ – unknown date – double-action revolver – .38 Smith & Wesson Special: Sporting model of the Czech Series ALFA Steel series of double-action revolvers chambered in .38 Smith & Wesson Special. Features a 6-inch-long barrel and LPA sights.)
- 9mm Parabellum Models(Czech Republic – ALFA-PROJ – unknown date – double-action revolvers – 9×19 mm Parabellum)
- ALFA-PROJ Model 9220(Czech Republic – ALFA-PROJ – unknown date – compact double-action revolver – 9×19 mm Parabellum: compact-length model of the Czech Series ALFA Steel series of double-action revolvers chambered in 9×19 mm Parabellum. Features a 2-inch-long barrel and fixed sights.)
- ALFA-PROJ Model 9230(Czech Republic – ALFA-PROJ – unknown date – double-action revolver – 9×19 mm Parabellum: Full-length model of the Czech Series ALFA Steel series of double-action revolvers chambered in 9×19 mm Parabellum. Features a 3-inch-long barrel and fixed sights.)
- ALFA-PROJ Model 9231(Czech Republic – ALFA-PROJ – unknown date – double-action revolver – 9×19 mm Parabellum: Variant of the Czech ALFA-PROJ Model 9230 double-action revolver. Features new front and adjustable rear sights.)
- ALFA-PROJ Model 9241(Czech Republic – ALFA-PROJ – unknown date – double-action revolver – 9×19 mm Parabellum: Full-length model of the Czech Series ALFA Steel series of double-action revolvers chambered in 9×19 mm Parabellum. Features a 4-inch-long barrel and fixed sights.)
- ALFA-PROJ Model 9261(Czech Republic – ALFA-PROJ – unknown date – double-action revolver – 9×19 mm Parabellum: Long-barreled model of the Czech Series ALFA Steel series of double-action revolvers chambered in 9×19 mm Parabellum. Features a 6-inch-long barrel and adjustable rear sights.)
- Series HOLEK(Czech Republic – ALFA-PROJ – unknown date – double-action revolvers – Various)
- .22 Long Rifle and .22 Winchester Magnum Rimfire Models(Czech Republic – ALFA-PROJ – unknown date – double-action revolver – .22 Long Rifle, .22 Winchester Magnum Rimfire)
- .32 S&W,.380 ALFA, .38 Smith & Wesson Special Models(Czech Republic – ALFA-PROJ – unknown date – double-action revolver – .32 S&W, .380 ALFA,.38 Smith & Wesson Special)
- AGM-1(Italy – semi-automatic carbine – .22 LR, 9×19 mm Parabellum, .45 ACP)
- Alejandro Sniper Rifle(Cuba – bolt-action sniper rifle – 7.62×54mmR)
- Akhgar machine gun (Iran– Gatling machine gun – 7.62×51 mm NATO)
- American Arms International
- Pistols
- American Arms PK22 (US – semi-automatic pistol – .22 LR)
- submachine guns
- American-180(US – submachine gun – .22 LR, .22 Short Magnum)
- American SAR 180/275(US – semi-automatic carbine – .22 LR, .22 Short Magnum)
- American Military Arms Corporation
- AMAC Delta-786 (US - submachine gun/PDW - 9×19 mm)
- Angel M80 Rifle (Australian - Single-shot rifle – 7.62×51 mm)
- Arcadia Machine and Tool
- Pistols
- AMT AutoMag(US –semi-automatic pistol – .44 AMP)
- AMT AutoMag 440 (US – semi-automatic pistol – .440 Cor-Bon)
- AMT AutoMag II (US – semi-automatic pistol – .22 WMR)
- AMT AutoMag III(US – semi-automatic pistol – 9mm Winchester Magnum, .30 carbine)
- AMT AutoMag IV (US – semi-automatic pistol – 10mm IAI Magnum, .45 Winchester Magnum)
- AMT AutoMag V(US –semi-automatic pistol– .50 Action Express)
- AMT Baby AutoMag (US–semi-automatic pistol– .22 LR)
- AMT Backup (US –semi-automatic pistol– 9×19 mm Parabellum, .22 LR, .357 SIG, .38 Super, .380 ACP, .40 S&W, .400 Cor-Bon, .45 ACP)
- AMT Hardballer (US – semi-automatic pistol – .45 ACP)
- AMT Government (US–semi-automatic pistol–.45 ACP)
- AMT Commando (US – Compact semi-automatic pistol – .40 S&W)
- AMT Longslide (US–semi-automatic pistol–.45 ACP)
- AMT Accelerator(US – semi-automatic pistol – .400 Cor-Bon)
- AMT Javelina (US – semi-automatic pistol – 10mm Auto)
- AMT Skipper (US –Compact semi-automatic pistol – .45 ACP)
- AMT Lightning 25/22(US – semi-automatic pistol – .22 LR)
- AMT Magnum Hunter(US – semi-automatic pistol – .22 WMR)
- AMT On-Duty(US – semi-automatic pistol – 9×19 mm Parabellum, .40 S&W, .45 ACP)
- Anderson Manufacturing
- Anderson Manufacturing RF-85
- AO-31(Soviet Union–assault rifle – 5.45×39mm, 7.62×39mm: Prototype)
- AO-35 (Soviet Union – assault rifle – 5.45×39mm, 7.62×39mm: Prototype)
- AO-36 (Soviet Union – twin-barreled assault rifle– 5.6×39mm: Prototype)
- AO-38 (Soviet Union – assault rifle – 5.45×39mm: Prototype)
- AO-40 (Soviet Union – assault rifle – 5.45×39mm: Prototype)
- AO-44 (Soviet Union – machine pistol – 9×18mm Makarov)
- AO-46(Soviet Union –compact assault rifle – 5.45×39mm: Prototype)
- AO-62(Soviet Union – assault rifle – 5.45×39mm)
- AO-63 (Soviet Union – twin-barreled assault rifle – 5.45×39mm)
- AO-64 (Soviet Union – general purpose machine gun – 6×49mm)
- AO-65 (Soviet Union – assault rifle – 5.45×39mm)
- AO-222(Russia – assault rifle – 5.45×39mm)
- Apache Revolver(France – multi-purpose pinfire revolver – 7mm, .27)
- APX 1895 (France – Gatling gun – 8mm Lebel)
- A.R.C. Weapons System (US - submachine gun – 9×19 mm / .45 ACP)
- Ares Defense
- Assault Rifles
- Ares Olin AIWS (US – assault rifle – 5mm)
- machine guns
- Ares Shrike(US – light machine gun – 5.56×45 mm NATO)
- Ares AAR (US – light machine gun – 5.56×45 mm NATO)
- Ares AAR/C (US – Compact light machine gun – 5.56×45 mm NATO)
- Ares Shrike 03A (US – light machine gun – 5.56×45 mm NATO)
- EXP-1 (US – light machine gun – 5.56×45 mm NATO: Prototype)
- EXP-2 (US – light machine gun – 5.56×45 mm NATO: Prototype)
- Ares Incorporated
- Assault Rifles
- Ares Olin AIWS (US – assault rifle – 5mm)
- machine guns
- ARES LMG-1(US– light machine gun– 5.56×45 mm NATO)
- submachine guns
- ARES FMG(US – submachine gun – 9×19 mm Parabellum)
- Arisaka Rifles
- Arisaka Type 30 rifle (Empire of Japan – bolt-action rifle – 6.5×50mm Arisaka)
- Arisaka Type 30 carbine(Empire of Japan – bolt-action carbine – 6.5×50mm Arisaka)
- Arisaka Type 35 Navy Rifle (Empire of Japan – bolt-action rifle – 6.5×50mm Arisaka)
- Arisaka Type 38 Rifle (Empire of Japan – bolt-action rifle – 6.5×50mm Arisaka)
- Arisaka Type 38 carbine (Empire of Japan – bolt-action carbine – 6.5×50mm Arisaka)
- Arisaka Type 44 carbine(Empire of Japan – bolt-action carbine – 6.5×50mm Arisaka)
- Arisaka Type 38 Cavalry Rifle (Empire of Japan – bolt-action carbine – 6.5×50mm Arisaka)
- Arisaka Type 97 Sniper Rifle(Empire of Japan – bolt-action sniper rifle – 6.5×50mm Arisaka)
- KL .303(Empire of Japan/Estonia – bolt-action rifle – .303 British)
- Type I Rifle(Empire of Japan/Italy – bolt-action rifle – 6.5×50mm Arisaka)
- Arisaka Type 99 Rifle (Empire of Japan – bolt-action rifle – 7.7×58mm Arisaka)
- Arisaka Type 99 Sniper Rifle (Empire of Japan – bolt-action rifle – 7.7×58mm Arisaka)
- TERA Rifle (Empire of Japan – bolt-action rifle – 6.5×50mm Arisaka)
- Type 1 Rifle (Empire of Japan – bolt-action rifle – 6.5×50mm Arisaka: Prototype)
- Type 2 Rifle (Empire of Japan – bolt-action rifle – 6.5×50mm Arisaka)
- Type 100 Rifle (Empire of Japan – bolt-action rifle – 6.5×50mm Arisaka: Prototype)
- Armaguerra Cremona
- Rifles
- Armaguerra Mod. 39(Italy – semiautomatic rifle– 7.35 mm, 6.5 mm)
- submachine guns
- Armaguerra OG-43(Italy –submachine gun 9×19 mm Parabellum)
- Armaguerra OG-44(Italy – submachine gun 9×19 mm Parabellum)
- FNAB-43(Italy – submachine gun – 9×19 mm Parabellum)
- Isotta Fraschini (mitra) (Italy – submachine gun – 9×19 mm Parabellum)
- TZ-45(Italy – submachine gun – 9×19 mm Parabellum)
- ArmaLite
- Rifles
- Armalite AR-5 (US – bolt-action rifle – .22 Hornet)
- Armalite AR-7 (US – semi-automatic rifle – .22 LR)
- Armalite AR-7 Explorer (US –semi-automatic rifle– .22 LR)
- Armalite AR-7 Explorer (US –semi-automatic pistol–.22 LR)
- Armalite AR-10(US – battle rifle – 7.62×51 mm NATO)
- Armalite AR-10A2 carbine(US – semi-automatic carbine – 7.62×51 mm NATO)
- ArmaLite AR-10A4 carbine(US – semi-automatic carbine – 7.62×51 mm NATO)
- Armalite AR-10B(US – semi-automatic rifle – 7.62×51 mm NATO)
- Armalite AR-10T(US – semi-automatic rifle – 7.62×51 mm NATO)
- Armalite AR-10 LMG (US – light machine gun – 7.62×51 mm NATO: Prototype)
- Armalite AR-14(US – semi-automatic rifle– 7.62×51 mm NATO,.243 Winchester,.358 Winchester)
- Armalite AR-15(US – semi-automatic rifle – 5.56×45 mm NATO)
- Armalite M15A2 National Match (US – semi-automatic rifle – 5.56×45 mm NATO)
- Armalite AR-16(US – battle rifle – 7.62×51 mm NATO)
- Armalite AR-18(US – assault rifle – 5.56×45 mm NATO)
- Armalite AR-18K(US – assault rifle – 5.56×45 mm NATO)
- Armalite AR-18S(US – carbine – 5.56×45 mm NATO)
- Armalite AR-180(US – semi-automatic rifle – 5.56×45 mm NATO)
- Armalite AR-180B (US – semi-automatic rifle – 5.56×45 mm NATO)
- Armalite AR-100
- Armalite AR-101(US – assault rifle – 5.56×45 mm NATO)
- Armalite AR-102(US – carbine – 5.56×45 mm NATO)
- Armalite AR-103(US – carbine – 5.56×45 mm NATO)
- Armalite AR-104 (US – light machine gun – 5.56×45 mm NATO)
- Armalite AR-24 (US/Turkey – semi-automatic pistol – 9×19 mm)
- Armalite AR-24/15 (US/Turkey – semi-automatic pistol – 9×19 mm)
- Armalite AR-24/15C (US/Turkey – semi-automatic pistol – 9×19 mm)
- Armalite AR-24K/13 (US/Turkey – Compact semi-automatic pistol – 9×19 mm)
- Armalite AR-24K/13C (US/Turkey – Compact semi-automatic pistol – 9×19 mm)
- Armalite AR-50(US – bolt-action anti-materiel rifle – .416 Barrett, .50 BMG)
- Armalite AR-30(US – bolt-action rifle – .300 Winchester Magnum, .308 Winchester, .338 Lapua)
- Armalite AR-30A1 (US – bolt-action rifle – .300 Winchester Magnum, .308 Winchester, .338 Lapua)
- Armalite AR-31(US – bolt-action rifle –.300 Winchester Magnum,.308 Winchester,.338 Lapua)
- Armalite AR-50A1 (US – bolt-action anti-materiel rifle – .416 Barrett, .50 BMG)
- Armalon
- Rifles
- Armalon BGR(UK – bolt-action rifle – .243 Winchester, 7.62mm NATO, & .300 Winchester Magnum)
- Armalon PC (UK – bolt-action carbine – 9×19 mm Parabellum, .38 Super, .357 Magnum, .40 S&W, 10mm Norma,.41 Action Express,.41 Magnum, .44 Magnum, .45 ACP, & .50 Action Express)
- Armalon PR (UK – bolt-action rifle – 5.56mm NATO & 7.62mm NATO)
- Armi Jager
- Rifles
- Adler AP70(Italy – semi-auto rifle – .22 LR)
- Adler AP85(Italy – semi-auto rifle – .22 LR)
- Adler FAMAS 22(Italy – semi-auto rifle – .22 LR)
- Adler T-26(Italy – semi-auto rifle – .30-06)
- Armitage Arms Pen Gun(AOW – .25 ACP)
- Armaments Research Company
- ARCO Abider (US - submachine gun - .45 ACP: Belt-fed)
- Armscor
- Pistols
- Armscor M200(Philippines – double-action revolver – .38 Smith & Wesson Special)
- Armscor M202(Philippines – double-action revolver – .38 Smith & Wesson Special)
- Armscor M206(Philippines – double-action revolver – .38 Smith & Wesson Special)
- Armscor M210(Philippines – double-action revolver – .38 Smith & Wesson Special)
- Rifles
- Armscor AK 47 22 (Philippines – semi-automatic rifle – .22 LR)
- Armscor M16 22 (Philippines – semi-automatic rifle – .22 LR)
- Armscor M1700 (Philippines – bolt-action rifle – .17 HMR)
- Armsel Striker(South Africa – Semi-Automatic Combat Shotgun – 12 Gauge)
- Armsel Proteca (South Africa – Semi-Automatic Combat Shotgun – 12 Gauge)
- Armsel Proteca Bulldog(South Africa – Semi-Automatic Combat Shotgun– 12 Gauge)
- Arms Tech Limited
- Pistols
- Arms Tech OSS High Standard(US – integrally suppressed semi-automatic pistol – .22 LR)
- Rifles
- Arms Tech AT 10/22 QD(US – Compact semi-automatic rifle – .22 LR)
- Arms Tech COMPAK-16(US – carbine – 5.56×45 mm NATO)
- Arms Tech Recon Rifle(US – carbine – 5.56×45 mm NATO)
- Arms Tech SBA 2000(US – bolt-action sniper rifle – 7.62×51 mm NATO)
- Arms Tech Super Match Interdiction Rifle(US – Sniper Rifle – .300 Winchester Magnum)
- Arms Tech TTR-50(US – bolt-action sniper rifle – .50 BMG)
- Arms Tech TTR-700(US – bolt-action sniper rifle – 7.62×51 mm NATO)
- Arms Tech USR(US – Semi-Automatic Sniper Rifle – 5.56×45 mm NATO)
- Arms Tech USR-K(US – Compact Semi-Automatic Sniper Rifle – 5.56×45 mm NATO)
- Armtech
- Rifles
- Armtech FAL SAS (Netherlands – semi-automatic carbine – 7.62×51 mm NATO)
- Armtech HK51(Netherlands – semi-automatic carbine – 7.62×51 mm NATO)
- Armtech SMOLT(Netherlands/US – double-action revolver – .357 Magnum)
- Arquebus(Various Countries – Matchlock Firearm – Various Calibers)
- Arsenal AD
- machine guns
- Arsenal LMG(Bulgaria – light machine gun – 5.45×39mm, 5.56×45 mm, 7.62×39mm)
- Arsenal LMG-F(Bulgaria – light machine gun – 5.45×39mm, 5.56×45 mm, 7.62×39mm)
- Arsenal MG (Bulgaria – General-Purpose machine gun – 7.62×54mmR)
- Pistols
- Arsenal P-M02 (Bulgaria – semi-automatic pistol – 9×19 mm Parabellum)
- Rifles
- Arsenal AR-1 (Bulgaria – assault rifle – 7.62×39mm)
- Arsenal AR-1F (Bulgaria – assault rifle – 7.62×39mm)
- Arsenal AR-M1 (Bulgaria – assault rifle – 5.56×45 mm NATO, 7.62×39mm)
- Arsenal AR-M1F (Bulgaria – assault rifle – 5.56×45 mm NATO, 7.62×39mm)
- Arsenal AR-M2 (Bulgaria – carbine – 5.56×45 mm NATO, 7.62×39mm)
- Arsenal AR-M2F (Bulgaria – carbine – 5.56×45 mm NATO, 7.62×39mm)
- Arsenal AR-M4SF (Bulgaria – compact assault rifle – 5.56×45 mm NATO, 7.62×39mm)
- Arsenal AR-M9 (Bulgaria – assault rifle – 5.56×45 mm NATO, 7.62×39mm)
- Arsenal AR-M9F (Bulgaria – assault rifle – 5.56×45 mm NATO, 7.62×39mm)
- Arsenal AR-SF (Bulgaria –carbine– 5.45×39mm, 7.62×39mm)
- Arsenal SLR-95 (Bulgaria – semi-automatic rifle – 7.62×39mm)
- submachine guns
- Arsenal Shipka (Bulgaria – submachine gun – 9×18mm Makarov, 9×19 mm Parabellum)
- ASAI ONE-PRO 45 (Switzerland – semi-automatic pistol – .400 Cor-Bon, .45 ACP)
- ASAI ONE-PRO 9 (Switzerland – semi-automatic pistol – 9×19 mm Parabellum)
- Ascaso Pistol (Spain –semi-automatic pistol– 9×23mm Largo: Astra 400 Copy)
- Aserma ADP Mk II (South Africa – semi-automatic pistol – 9×19 mm Parabellum)
- ASP Pistol (US –semi-automatic pistol 9×19 mm Parabellum)
- Astra Arms
- Pistols
- Astra 200 (Spain – semi-automatic pistol – .25 ACP: FN Model 1906 Clone)
- Astra 400(Spain – semi-automatic pistol – 9×23mm Largo)
- Astra 300(Spain – semi-automatic pistol–.32 ACP,.380 ACP)
- Astra 600(Spain – semi-automatic pistol– 9×19 mm Parabellum)
- Astra 800 Condor(Spain – semi-automatic pistol– 9×19 mm Parabellum)
- Astra 900(Spain – semi-automatic pistol – 7.63×25mm Mauser: Mauser C96 copy)
- Astra 900E(Spain – semi-automatic pistol – 7.63×25mm Mauser)
- Astra 900F(Spain – semi-automatic pistol – 7.63×25mm Mauser)
- Astra 901(Spain – machine pistol – 7.63×25mm Mauser)
- Astra 902(Spain – machine pistol – 7.63×25mm Mauser)
- Astra 903(Spain – machine pistol – 7.63×25mm Mauser)
- Astra 904(Spain – machine pistol – 7.63×25mm Mauser)
- Astra 904E(Spain – machine pistol – 9×23mm Largo)
- Astra 960(Spain – double-action revolver – .38 Smith & Wesson Special)
- Astra 1921(Spain – semi-automatic pistol – .25 ACP)
- Astra 4000 Falcon(Spain – semi-automatic pistol– .32 ACP, .380 ACP)
- Astra A-50(Spain – semi-automatic pistol–.22 LR,.32 ACP, .380 ACP)
- Astra A-60(Spain – semi-automatic pistol – .380 ACP)
- Astra A-70 (Spain – semi-automatic pistol – 9×19 mm Parabellum, .40 S&W)
- Astra A-75(Spain – semi-automatic pistol – 9×19 mm Parabellum, .40 S&W, .45 ACP)
- Astra A-80 (Spain – semi-automatic pistol – 7.65×21mm Parabellum, 9×19 mm Parabellum, 9×23mm Largo, .38 Super, .45 ACP)
- Astra A-90(Spain – semi-automatic pistol– 9×19 mm Parabellum)
- Astra A-100(Spain – semi-automatic pistol– 9×19 mm Parabellum, .40 S&W, .45 ACP)
- Astra Cadix(Spain – double-action revolver – .38 Smith & Wesson Special)
- Astra Cub(Spain – semi-automatic pistol–.22 Short,.25 ACP)
- Astra Constable(Spain – semi-automatic pistol – .22 LR, .32 ACP, .380 ACP)
- Astra Firefox(Spain – semi-automatic pistol – 9×19 mm Parabellum)
- Astra Police(Spain – double-action revolver – .357 Magnum)
- submachine guns
- Modelo 1921 MAF(Spain – submachine gun – 9×23mm Largo: Prototype)
- Austen submachine gun(Australia – submachine gun – 9×19 mm Parabellum)
- Austen Mk I (Australia – submachine gun – 9×19 mm Parabellum)
- Austen Mk II (Australia – submachine gun – 9×19 mm Parabellum)
- Australian Automatic Arms
- Rifles
- Australian Automatic Arms SAR (Australia – semi-automatic rifle – 5.56×45 mm NATO)
- Australian Automatic Arms SAC (Australia – semi-automatic carbine – 5.56×45 mm NATO)
- Australian Automatic Arms SAP (Australia – semi-automatic pistol – 5.56×45 mm NATO)
- Australian Automatic Arms SP (Australia – semi-automatic rifle – 5.56×45 mm NATO)
- Australian International Arms
- Rifles
- Australian International Arms No 4 Mk 4 (Australia – bolt-action rifle – 7.62×51 mm NATO)
- Australian International Arms M10-A1(Australia – bolt-action carbine – 7.62×39mm)
- Australian International Arms M10-A2(Australia – bolt-action carbine – 7.62×39mm)
- Australian International Arms M10-B1(Australia – bolt-action carbine – 7.62×51 mm NATO, .308 Winchester)
- Australian International Arms M10-B2(Australia – bolt-action carbine – 7.62×51 mm NATO, .308 Winchester)
- Australian International Arms M42(Australia – bolt-action carbine – 7.62×51 mm NATO)
- Australian International Arms No. 4 Mk IV T (Australia – bolt-action rifle – 7.62×51 mm NATO)
- Australian Military Weapon Designations
- machine guns
- F2A2 (Australia – light machine gun – 7.62×51 mm NATO: Licensed Production Bren light machine gun)
- F89 Minimi (Australia – light machine gun – 5.56×45 mm NATO: Licensed Production FN Minimi)
- Rifles
- F88 Austeyr (Australia – assault rifle – 5.56×45 mm NATO: Licensed Production Steyr AUG)
- F88C Austeyr (Australia – carbine – 5.56×45 mm NATO)
- F88S-A1 Austeyr (Australia – assault rifle – 5.56×45 mm NATO)
- F88S-A1C Austeyr (Australia – carbine – 5.56×45 mm NATO)
- F88S-A2 Austeyr (Australia – assault rifle – 5.56×45 mm NATO)
- EF88 Austeyr (Australia – assault rifle – 5.56×45 mm NATO)
- F90 Austeyr (Australia – assault rifle – 5.56×45 mm NATO: Export Variant)
- F90 Close Quarters Battle(Australia – carbine – 5.56×45 mm NATO)
- F90 Grenadier (Australia – assault rifle with grenade launcher – 5.56×45 mm NATO, 40×46 mm SR grenade)
- F90 Marksman (Australia – Designated Marksman Rifle Rifle – 5.56×45 mm NATO)
- F88T Austeyr (Australia –training rifle– .22 LR)
- F88S GLA(Australia – assault rifle with grenade launcher – 5.56×45 mm NATO, 40×46 mm SR Grenade)
- SR-98(Commonwealth of Australia/United Kingdom of Great Britain and Northern Ireland – Australian Defence Force/Accuracy International – 2001 – bolt-action sniper rifle – 7.62×51 mm NATO: Australian variant of the British Accuracy International Arctic Warfare. Features a threaded, free floating barrel, an adjustable bipod, and a customized folding stock. Replaced the Parker Hale M82 bolt-action sniper rifles in service with the Australian Defence Force.)
- submachine guns
- F1 submachine gun (Australia – submachine gun – 9×19 mm Parabellum)
- Auto-Ordnance
- Rifles
- Thompson Autorifle (US – semi-automatic rifle – 7.62×54mmR, .276 Pedersen, .30–'06: Prototype)
- Thompson Light Rifle (US – assault rifle – .30 carbine: prototype)
- submachine guns
- Thompson submachine gun (US – submachine gun – .45 ACP)
- Thompson .30 carbine(US – semi-automatic carbine – .30 carbine: prototype)
- Annihilator(US – submachine gun– .45 ACP: Prototype)
- Thompson M1(US – submachine gun – .45 ACP)
- Thompson M1A1(US– submachine gun– .45 ACP)
- Thompson M1919(US – submachine gun – 9×19 mm Parabellum, .22 LR, .32 ACP, .380 ACP, .45 ACP: Prototype)
- Thompson M1921 (US – submachine gun – .45 ACP)
- Thompson M1921AC (US – submachine gun – .45 ACP)
- Thompson M1923(US – submachine gun – .45 Remington-Thompson: Prototype)
- Thompson M1927(US – carbine – .45 ACP)
- Thompson M1927A1(US – carbine – .45 ACP)
- Thompson M1927A3(US – carbine – .22 LR)
- Thompson M1927A5(US – carbine – .45 ACP)
- Thompson M1928 (US – submachine gun – .45 ACP)
- Thompson M1928A1 (US – submachine gun – .45 ACP)
- Persuader (US – submachine gun – .45 ACP: Prototype)
- AVB-7.62 (Soviet Union – battle rifle – 7.62×54mmR)
- AB-5.45 (Soviet Union – assault rifle – 5.45×39mm)
- AB-7.62 (Soviet Union – assault rifle – 7.62×39mm)
- LCZ B20 (Czech Republic – battle rifle – 7.62×51 mm NATO)
- Avco
- Avco Avroc (US – Rocket Propelled Grenade – 40mm Rocket)
- Avroc 5-20
- Avroc 8-20
- Avroc 15-40
- Avroc 25-40
- AVS-36 (Soviet Union – 1936 – battle rifle – 7.62×54mmR)
- AVS-36 Sniper Variant (Soviet Union – 1936 – battle rifle – 7.62×54mmR)
- AWC Systems Technology
- Pistols
- AWC Amphibian II (US – integrally suppressed semi-automatic pistol – .22 LR: modified Ruger Mk II)
- Rifles
- AWC Centurion (US – integrally suppressed bolt-action carbine – .45 ACP: modified De Lisle carbine)
- AWC Ultra II (US – integrally suppressed semi-automatic rifle – .22 LR: modified Ruger 10/22 copy)
- AWC G2 (US – Sniper Rifle – 7.62×51 mm NATO: Bullpup Conversion of M14)
- AWC G2A(US – Sniper Rifle – 7.62×51 mm NATO)
- AWC G2FA (US – Automatic Sniper Rifle – 7.62×51 mm NATO)

== See also ==
- List of firearms by era
  - List of pre-20th century firearms
  - List of World War II firearms
- List of firearms by country
  - List of modern Russian small arms
- Lists of firearms by actions
  - List of blow-forward firearms
  - List of delayed-blowback firearms
- List of firearms by type
  - List of assault rifles
  - List of battle rifles
  - List of carbines
  - List of firearm brands
  - List of flamethrowers
  - List of machine guns
  - List of multiple-barrel firearms
  - List of pistols
  - List of shotguns
  - List of sniper rifles
  - List of submachine guns
- List of firearm cartridges
  - List of handgun cartridges
  - List of rifle cartridges
- List of semi-automatic firearms
  - List of semi-automatic pistols
  - List of semi-automatic rifles
  - List of semi-automatic shotguns
  - List of most-produced firearms
