= Leader Dynamics Series T2 MK5 =

T2 MK5 Assault Rifle/Carbine
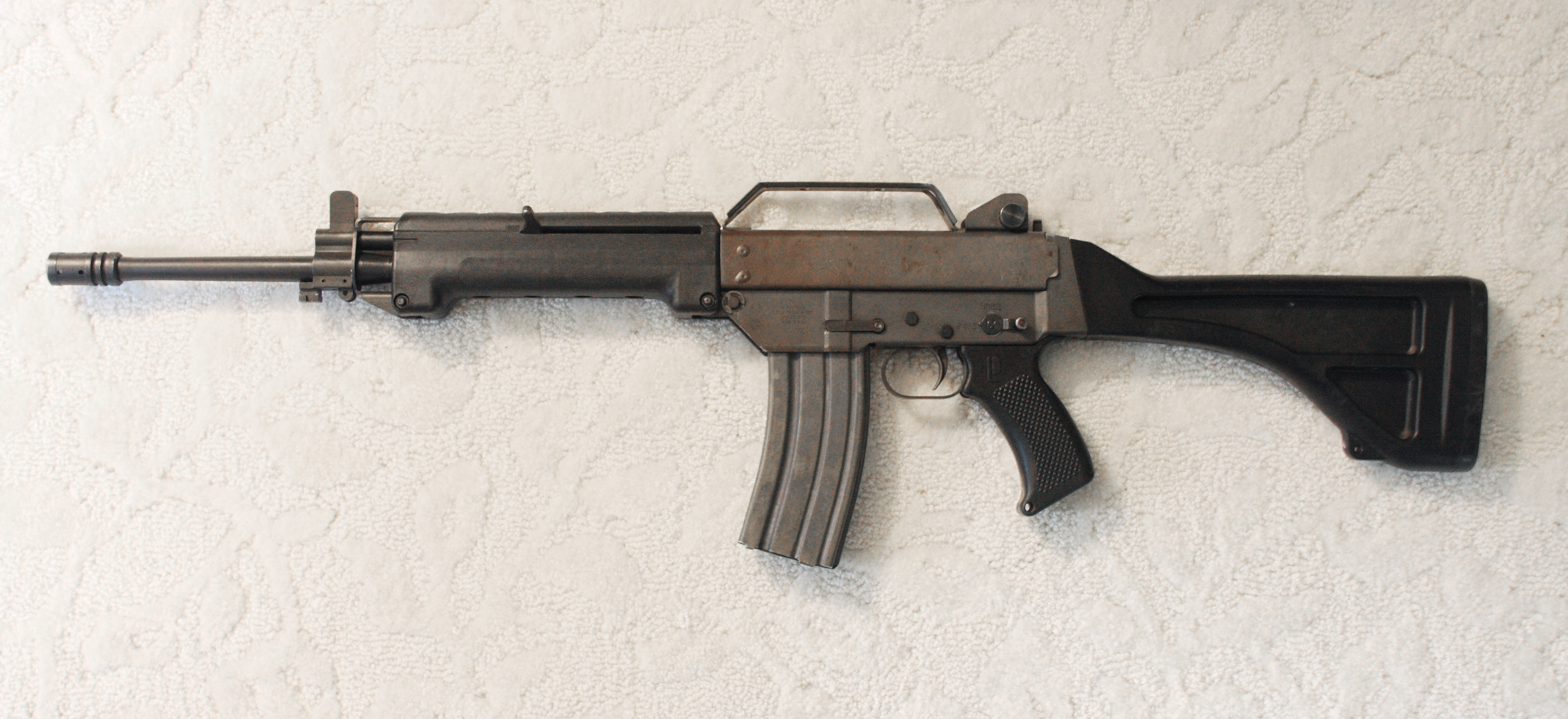
- Semi-auto US import Leader T2
- Type: Assault rifle carbine
- Place of origin: Australia

Service history
- Used by: Australia

Production history
- Designer: Charles St. George
- Designed: 1978
- Manufacturer: Leader Dynamics; Australian Automatic Arms
- Produced: 1980s-1996

Specifications
- Mass: 7.5 lb (3.40 kg)
- Length: 38 in (965 mm)
- Barrel length: 16.125 in (410 mm)
- Cartridge: 5.56×45mm NATO
- Caliber: 5.56mm
- Action: Gas-operated
- Rate of fire: 700 rpm
- Feed system: Various STANAG Magazines.
- Sights: Iron sights

The Leader T2 MK5 Series firearms were chambered for the 5.56×45mm NATO cartridge and manufactured by Leader Dynamics of Smithfield, NSW, Australia (1978-1982/1983). The Leader was the brainchild of British weapons designer Charles St. George. It was originally a contender for a 5.56 mm Australian military service rifle to replace the then-issued Lithgow L1A1 SLR and Colt M16A1 rifles. What was unique about this endeavor was that Australia had never designed or manufactured its own commercial gas-operated semi-automatic rifle. The rifle was abandoned when the Steyr AUG was adopted for use by the Australian military.

Of interest to those that study firearms, designs and evolution, the T2 used a triangular bolt-face that was similar to the Winchester Model 100. This was adopted because the original bolt-face was too complex and expensive to manufacture.

In a case of parallel development, Barrett Firearms uses a similar design for the M82A1 and its bolt action guns. St. George worked for Barrett at around this time but was not involved in design or engineering duties.

== Origins ==
Fred Riddle of Dupont Australia and Charles St. George worked together (with the input of Dupont USA) to select an appropriate engineering plastic for the pistol grip, handguards and butt-stock.

Charles St. George designed the production tooling, and the factory at Smithfield began to initially turn out 200 units per month, which increased to 400 per month some months later. St. George developed a selective-fire version called the T2 (including a carbine version of the T1 Leader) which attracted the interest of the Royal Australian Armoured Corps, as well as foreign arms companies, including Luigi Franchi (a subsidiary of Beretta) in Italy, Fábrica Militar de Braço de Prata in Portugal, and foreign militaries, such as the Sultanate of Oman Armed Forces. ATA Target Systems of Albury NSW hosted the visitors, and Charles St. George together with Terry Dinnen demonstrated the Leader weapons on ATA's Dart System. The Leader demonstration resulted in Oman placing trial weapon orders for 12 Leader select-fire rifles (SAR) and 12 Leader assault carbines (SAC).

=== European markets ===
During this period, Charles St. George departed for Europe and conducted demonstrations in Portugal, Malta and Italy. Luigi Franchi were very impressed with the Leader and wanted to purchase a manufacturing license with customers in Europe and Asia. Unfortunately, Jack Allen and Brian Shaw, the two other partners in Leader, were not able to conclude a satisfactory contract with Luigi Franchi. Franchi eventually developed their own weapon.

=== United States market ===
The Leader was originally imported into the U.S. by Ed Hoffman and Tim Painter of World Public Safety, California. The Leader was exhibited at the New Orleans Shot Show and orders in excess of $3,000,000 were written. The original buyers/distributors were John Giovino NY, Bumble Bee CA and Ellett Brothers. These weapons are quite rare in the US as very few (fewer than 2000 rifles) made it into the country.

== Design and manufacturing features ==
The cocking lever, like that of the Heckler & Koch G3, ran from the forend to the bolt, was non-reciprocating, and could fold forward out of the way. It was mounted over the left action rod and supported by the barrel extension. The cylindrical flash hider was similar to that on the early model Colt Commando models (and suffered from the same problems). It had a diopter rear sight that could be set to 100, 200 and 300 meters and a hooded post front sight. The selector switch was similar to that of the AR-18 and was set for Safe-Fire in semi-automatic or Safe-Fire-Auto in selective fire.

The weapon is quite simple and tooling cost was kept to a minimum. The receiver was a simple 16 gauge steel square tube readily available and saved thousands of dollars in die costs.

Charles St. George had to convince Australian engineering companies that it was possible to make gun parts and that close tolerances were not imperative, as is the common belief. Barrels from Lithgow were too expensive so St. George designed and built his own button rifling machine using a self-rotating button with a pushing motion. The barrel blanks were imported from Parker Hale in the United Kingdom with H&K providing the chamber machining details and Chartered Industries of Singapore supplied the 20-round M16 magazines.

The Leader actually had a self-cleaning gas system without the need for a gas regulator. The bolt carrier group was derived from that of the AR-18 but was assembled into a modular system such that the bolt, carrier, and guide rods were a self-contained unit, obviating the loss of parts during dis-assembly. Simple spot welds were used throughout the fabrication and full use of early powder-metal parts that were used for the rear sight system and magazine latch.

== Faults and defects ==
The cylindrical flash hider was rated as either insufficient or ineffective and was usually replaced by an aftermarket Colt AR-15/M16 A2 "birdcage" model by owners. The loose tolerances for the magazine well could allow the magazine to move up inside it when the bolt was pulled to the rear, causing potential feeding jams. The chamber was sometimes too tight on early models, causing a failure to extract. Later models made by AAA were made to tighter tolerances and usually eliminated many of these problems.

== Company issues ==
In 1982 St. George split from both Brian Shaw and Jack Allan and moved on and established Armtech Pty Ltd. The company folded in 1983 and the patents held sold to Australian Automatic Arms.

== Australian Automatic Arms (AAA) ==
Leader Dynamics was subsequently sold off to a businessman who formed his own company, Australian Automatic Arms, and started to make the Leader rifles in Tasmania. They differed in lacking the carrying handle of the Leader and coming with a 30-round magazine.

The Semi-Auto Rifle (SAR) had a 16.25" [413 mm] barrel and synthetic stock.

The Semi-Auto Carbine (SAC) had a 10.5" [266 mm] barrel and synthetic stock.

The Semi-Auto Pistol (SAP) (dubbed the "Tasmanian Devil") was a pistol-gripped stockless version of the SAC. It came with a sling to brace it during firing. Only 700 were imported into the US before being banned in 1994.

The Sporting Purpose 20 (SP-20) had a 20" [508 mm] barrel and wood furniture and was sold as a sport shooting and hunting weapon. The forend was a wooden version of the polymer forend and the butt had a semi-pistol grip with a rubber recoil pad.

Semi-automatic rifles and shotguns were restricted in Australia in 1996 following the Port Arthur massacre (Australia). The Leader was soon after withdrawn from production.

== See also ==
- Armalite AR-18/ArmaLite AR-100
- F88 Austeyr
- M16 rifle
- SA80
- Sterling SAR 87
- List of assault rifles
