= Armscor AK22 =

- Type: Semi-automatic rifle
- Place of origin: Philippines

Production history
- Designed: 1987
- Manufacturer: Ruko Products
- Variants: AK22F

Specifications
- Mass: 7 lb (3.2 kg) (unloaded)
- Length: 36 in (910 mm)
- Barrel length: 18.25 in (464 mm)
- Height: 8 in (200 mm)
- Caliber: .22 LR
- Feed system: 10, 15, or 30 round box magazine
- Sights: Post front sight, open U-notch fully-adjustable rear

The Armscor AK22 is a semi-automatic .22 LR Kalashnikov rifle designed in 1987 by Ruko Products (later KBI), and sold by Armscor (Arms Corporation of the Philippines). Sales of the AK22 and other .22 LR Armscor rifles were "very strong in the local market", due to a relaxation of gun laws, after the end of martial law under Ferdinand Marcos in 1986.

== Design ==
In order to save costs, the AK22's design is based on the Model 20, a previous .22 LR design by Armscor. The AK22 uses a clamshell which holds the receiver and trigger housing together. The clamshell design increases the weight of the weapon, and requires the usage of a screwdriver in order to be field stripped. The stock, forend and foregrip are all made out of mahogany, which further increased its weight, and made the rifle disproportional, with some gunsmiths choosing to cut them down.

It has a 4–6 lb (1.8–2.7 kg) trigger pull.

=== Variants ===
The AK22F, a variant with a folding stock modeled after the one on the FAL PARA, was also produced to compete with Kalashnikov clones from other countries such as Italy, France, and Germany. It was discontinued in 1995.

Magazines for the AK22 are compatible with other Armscor designs, such as the Armscor M16 22 and IMI Galil-22. 10-, 15-, and 30-round magazines were made, with the 15-round magazine being discontinued some time before 2015.

== See also ==
- AK-47 variants
