= Rock Island Armory 1911 series =

RIA 1911 series
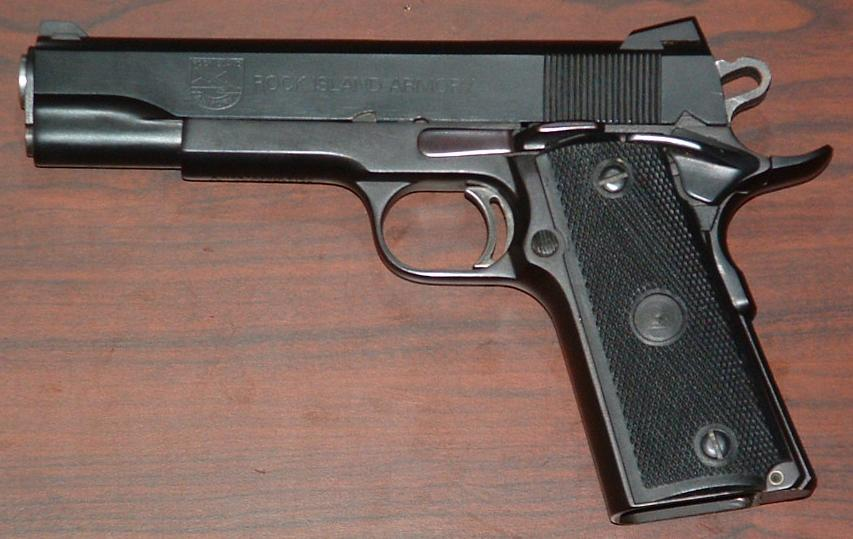
- RIA Tactical pistol (discontinued model)
- Type: Semi-automatic pistol
- Place of origin: Philippines

Production history
- Manufacturer: Armscor
- Produced: 1911–present
- Variants: FS; MS; CS; A2 Hi-capacity; Tactical; Match

Specifications
- Mass: 38.4 ounces (1.09 kg)
- Length: 7¾ in (197 mm)
- Barrel length: 5 in (127 mm)
- Width: 1.5 in (38 mm)
- Height: 5.45 in (138 mm)
- Caliber: .45 ACP; 10mm Auto.40 S&W.38 Super; 9mm.22 TCM
- Action: semi-automatic, single action
- Feed system: 8 round magazine (FS model)
- Sights: fixed G.I. (FS model)

The Rock Island Armory 1911 series is a product line of single-action recoil operated semi-automatic pistols.

== Design ==
RIA (Rock Island Armory) 1911s are derivatives of the US Military G.I. M1911-A1, the standard issue US Service pistol from 1911 to 1985.

Most RIA models are targeted at the low-end price point of the 1911 pistol market and are basic entry-level MIL-SPEC versions of the 1911.

However, some models offer additional higher-end features.

=== Specifications ===
The general specifications for Rock Island Armory 1911 pistols are:

- Ordnance grade 4140 chromoly steel steel construction with a cast frame.
- 100% parts compatibility with US G.I.
- Flat grooved steel mainspring housing
- Calibers: .45 ACP, 10mm Auto, .40 S&W, .38 Super, 9mm Luger, and .22 TCM
- Finishes: blued, Parkerized, nickel, Patriot brown cerakote
- Grooved trigger
- Approx. 5¼ lb. (23 N) trigger pull
- Non-checkered smooth wooden, checkered black rubber or VZ type grips, depending on model
- Hard plastic clamshell storage case
- Manual

== Variants ==
The Compact model features a skeletonized hammer and beavertail grip safety, while the Tactical model adds a target-grade hammer and trigger, as well as an ambidextrous safety and enhanced contrast iron sights.

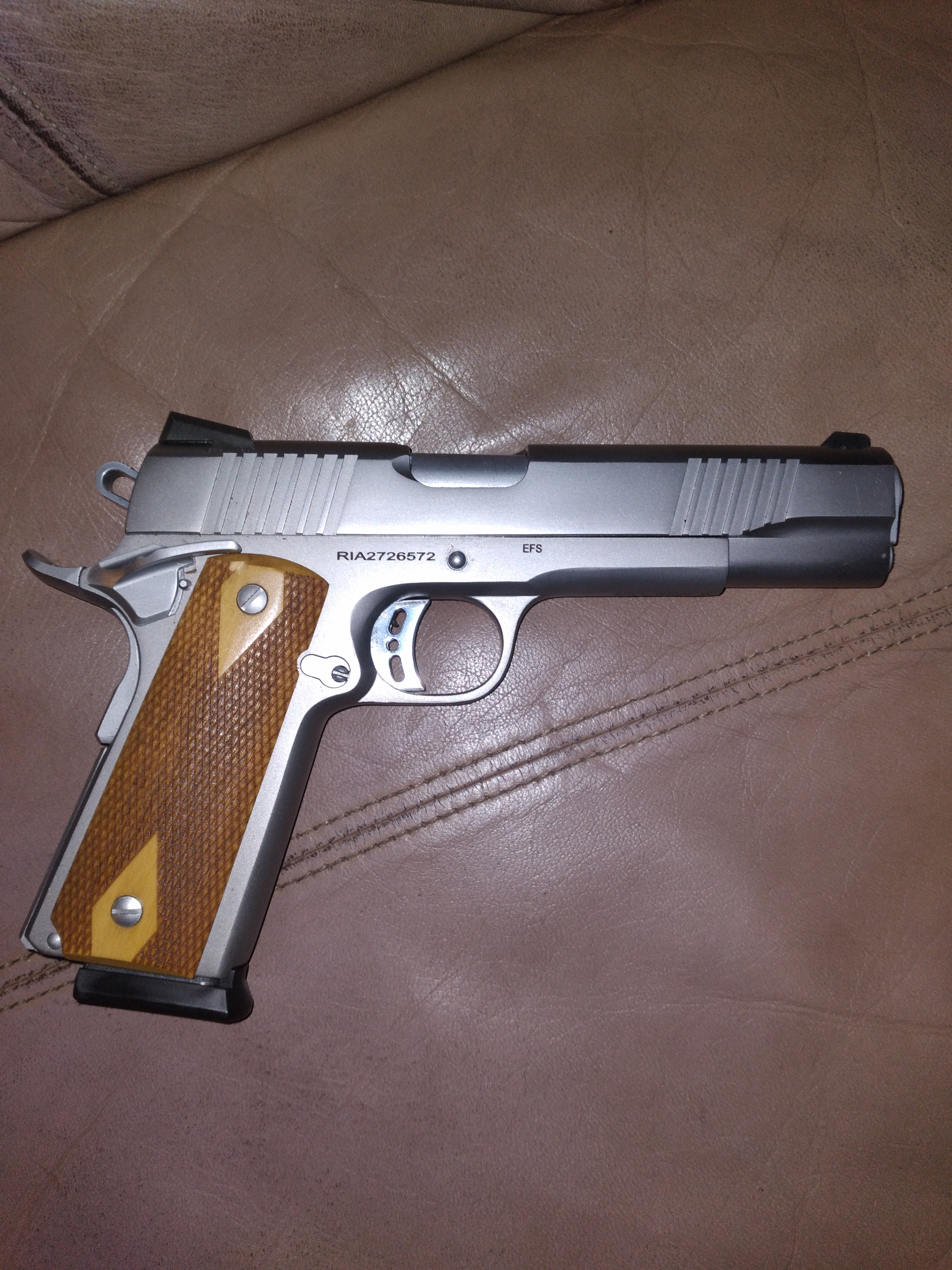
Rock Island Armory 1911 EFS Stainless Steel in 45 ACP.

Variants of Rock Island Armory 1911 pistols include:

	1911-A1 FS	1911-A1 MS	1911-A1 CS	1911-A2 FS HC	1911-A1 Tactical	1911-A1 Match
Size	Full	Commander	Compact (Colt Officer)	Full, double-stack	Full	Full
Length	8.75 in	7.75 in	6.75 in	8.75 to 9.75 in	8.75 in	8.75 in
Barrel; Length	5 in	4.25 in	3.5 in bull	5 in or 6 in	5 in	5 in
Weight	2.4 lb	2.2 lb	2.16 lb	2.6 lb	2.5 lb	2.4 lb
Sights	G.I.	Snag-free	Snag-free	(varies)	Snag-free Combat	LPA Adjustable
Magazine; Capacity	8 round	8 round	7 round	14 round (.45 ACP) 16 round (10mm Auto)	8 round	8 round
Image; Thumbnail						

== Distribution ==
RIA 1911 pistols are designed and manufactured by Armscor in Marikina, Philippines, and distributed in the United States by Armscor USA, located in Pahrump, Nevada. Armscor is an ISO 9001 certified-compliant company.

== Users ==
- Philippines

== See also ==
- Colt M1911
