= Armscor M1700 =

- Type: Rifle
- Place of origin: Philippines

Production history
- Manufacturer: Armscor

Specifications
- Mass: 6.5 lb (2.9 kg)
- Length: 40.5 in (103 cm)
- Barrel length: 22 in (56 cm)
- Cartridge: .17 HMR
- Action: Bolt-action
- Muzzle velocity: 2,500 ft/s (760 m/s)
- Effective firing range: 325 ft (99 m)
- Feed system: 5-round magazine
- Sights: Fiber-optic front, adjustable rear

The Armscor M1700 is a compact, bolt-action hunting rifle chambered for the .17 HMR cartridge. Originally designed for hunting, like its predecessor the Armscor M1600, it is also used for pest-control. Its light weight (6 lb) and short length (40.5 in) make it a comfortable weapon to shoot up to and beyond 300 feet. It comes in either a blue or stainless steel finish, a wood stock, has a 5-round internal magazine, and a thumb-operated trigger block device for a safety. It comes standard with fiber optics front sights and adjustable rear sights and can be mounted with a scope.
