= .284 Winchester =

US rifle cartridge

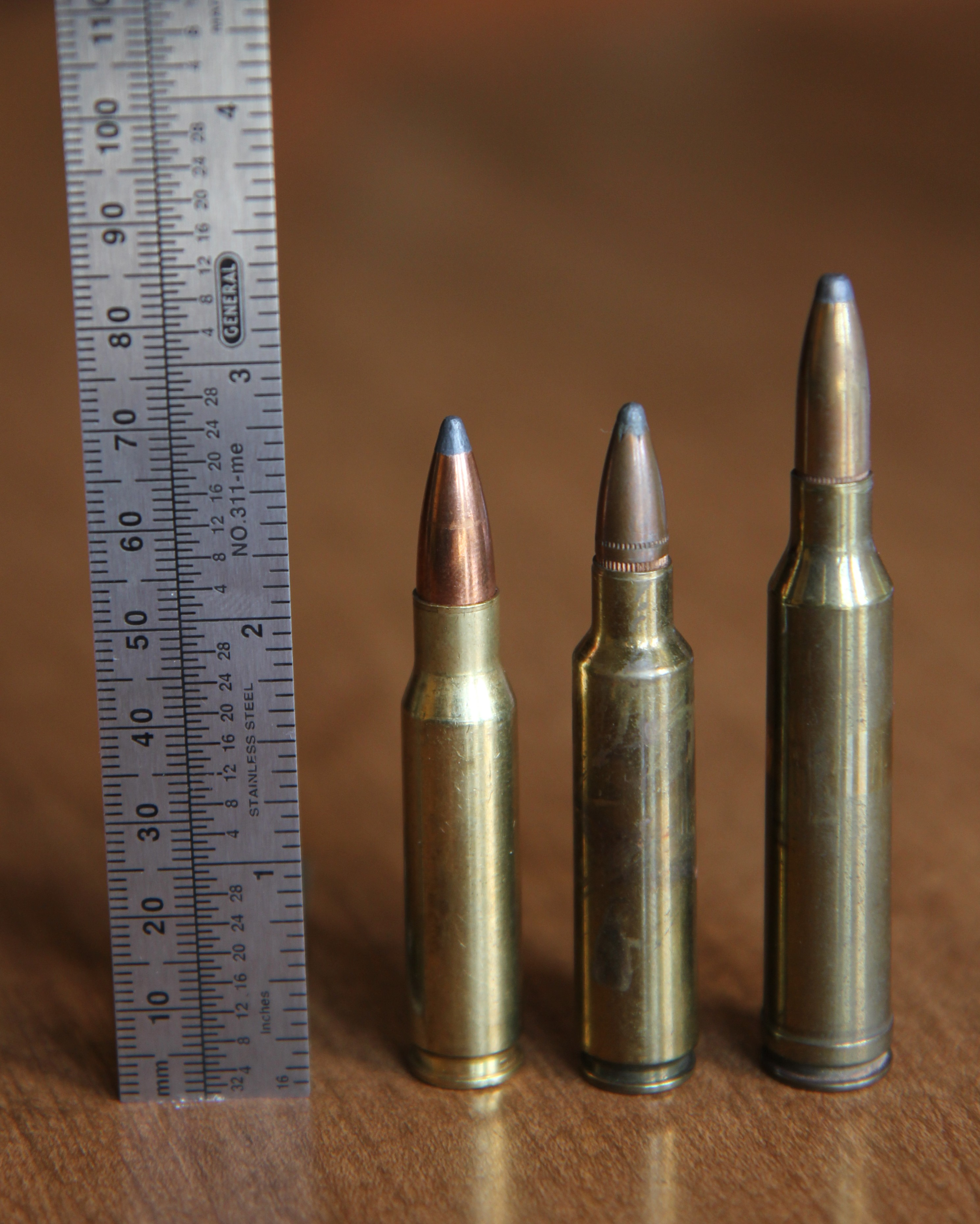
- .284 Winchester (center) with .308 Win (left) and 7mm Remington Magnum (right)
- Type: Rifle
- Place of origin: United States

Production history
- Designer: Winchester
- Designed: 1963
- Manufacturer: Winchester
- Produced: 1963–present

Specifications
- Case type: rebated rim, bottleneck
- Bullet diameter: 7.21 mm (0.284 in)
- Land diameter: 7.00 mm (0.276 in)
- Neck diameter: 8.13 mm (0.320 in)
- Shoulder diameter: 12.06 mm (0.475 in)
- Base diameter: 12.72 mm (0.501 in)
- Rim diameter: 12.01 mm (0.473 in)
- Rim thickness: 1.37 mm (0.054 in)
- Case length: 55.12 mm (2.170 in)
- Overall length: 71.12 mm (2.800 in)
- Case capacity: 4.29 cm^{3} (66.2 gr H_{2}O)
- Rifling twist: 254 mm (1 in 10 in)
- Primer type: Large rifle
- Maximum pressure (C.I.P.): 440.00 MPa (63,817 psi)
- Maximum pressure (SAAMI): 386 MPa (56,000 psi)

Ballistic performance
| Bullet mass/type | Velocity | Energy |
|---|---|---|
| 100 gr (6 g) HDY 100 HP | 3,175 ft/s (968 m/s) | 2,238 ft⋅lbf (3,034 J) |
| 120 gr (8 g) SPR 120 SP | 2,968 ft/s (905 m/s) | 2,347 ft⋅lbf (3,182 J) |
| 139 gr (9 g) HDY 139 SP | 2,845 ft/s (867 m/s) | 2,498 ft⋅lbf (3,387 J) |
| 150 gr (10 g) Super-X Power-Point | 2,860 ft/s (870 m/s) | 2,724 ft⋅lbf (3,693 J) |
- Test barrel length: 24 in (610 mm); Source: Winchester Ammunition Accurate Powder

The .284 Winchester (7.21x55mmRB) is a rebated rim rifle cartridge introduced by the Winchester Repeating Arms Company in 1963.

The .284 Winchester was designed to duplicate the performance of the .270 Winchester and .280 Remington cartridges from the new Winchester Model 100 autoloader and Winchester Model 88 lever-action rifles. The result was a 7 mm cartridge of comparable overall length to the .308 Winchester with greater case capacity and power potential.

.284 Winchester has enjoyed a resurgence due to interest from long-range competitive shooters. Winchester has continued to produce brass cases for this cartridge since 1963.

== History ==
The Savage Model 99 lever-action, Winchester Model 100 autoloader, Winchester Model 88 lever-action, and Ruger Ruger M77 rifles were chambered in the .284 Winchester.

The 7.5x55 Swiss provided inspiration for the cartridge, with the bullet diameter reduced to 7mm and the rim rebated to .473-inch caliber to allow for the use of the bolt faces common to the 7.92×57mm Mauser and its many derivatives.

== Cartridge dimensions ==
The .284 Winchester has 4.29 mL (66 grains H_{2}O) of cartridge case capacity. The case has a rebated rim and a body diameter nearly as large in diameter as the .375 H&H Magnum and its derivatives.

.284 Winchester maximum C.I.P. cartridge dimensions All sizes in millimeters (mm).

American conventions define the shoulder angle at alpha/2 = 35 degrees. The common rifling twist rate for this cartridge is 254 mm (1 in 10 in), 6 grooves, Ø lands = 7.00 mm, Ø grooves = 7.19 mm, land width = 2.79 mm and the primer type is large rifle.

According to the official C.I.P. guidelines, .284 Winchester specifications call for a 440 MPa (63,816 psi) piezo pressure. In C.I.P. regulated countries, firearms chambered in any given cartridge must be proofed at 125% of the maximum C.I.P. pressure to certify sale to consumers.
The SAAMI pressure limit for the .284 Winchester is 56,000 PSI (386 MPa).

== Contemporary use ==
The .284 Winchester is ballistically similar to the .280 Remington with equivalent bullet weights. Aside from Winchester, no major company has loaded factory ammunition for the .284 Winchester.

The cartridge is sometimes used for long-range target shooting disciplines such as F-Class, where participants typically handload their ammunition. For this application the .284 Winchester is generally loaded with heavy for caliber very-low-drag bullets.

The .284 Winchester is not popular in Europe, where it competes with the ballistically similar 7×64mm. When compared to the .284 Winchester, the 7×64mm has a lower C.I.P. maximum allowed chamber pressure and a slightly larger bore. European 7 mm cartridges feature 7.24 mm (0.285 in) grooves Ø diameter, while American 7 mm cartridges have 7.21 mm (0.284 in) grooves Ø.

=== Wildcats ===
While the .284 Winchester has occasionally been chambered in factory rifles, the chief reason for its survival is wildcatting. Wildcats are not governed by C.I.P. or SAAMI rules so wildcatters can capitalize on achievable high operating pressures. With the .284 Winchester as the parent case, wildcatters have created the .22-284, 6mm-284, 6.5mm-284, .284 Shehane, .30-284, .338-284, .35-284, .450 Bushmaster and the .375-284 variants and the .475 Wildey Magnum pistol cartridge.

In those countries where restrictions prevent civilian use of firearms chambered in a military cartridge, the .30-284 wildcat has been a favored option to convert military surplus rifles. Russian Mosin–Nagant and Swiss Schmidt–Rubin rifles, as well as 7.5×54 French MAS caliber rifles may be rechambered. The easiest way to do this is to rechamber the firearm to something that uses the same barrel bore, such as .30 cal. or 7.62 mm, but completely removes the old chamber during the process. The C.I.P. has recognized and registered both the 30-284 NOLASCO, and the extremely similar (in the US considered a "Wildcat cartridge" based on the .284 Winchester) 30-284 Win. Both these chamberings completely remove the original 7.5×54mm MAS chamber. They also both have the same C.I.P. pressure ratings as the 7.62×54mm MAS cartridge but differ in their overall length due to the length of the bullet - the NOLASCO carrying a longer bullet for better feeding and an improved ballistic coefficient, and to meet a somewhat more common European overall length of 76 mm, the same as the 7.5x54mm French and very close to the 7.5×55mm Swiss.

In terms of popularity, the 6.5-284 Norma cartridge has likely exceeded its parent case. This former wildcat, made by necking down the original Winchester .284 casing to 6.5mm (.264), was developed for long range target shooting where participants usually handload their ammunition. At that time, it was one of the most used non-wildcat cartridges by match shooters in F-Class and 1000 yd/m benchrest long range competitions. In 2022, because of advancements in high BC 7mm bullet designs, the original Winchester .284 case has made a comeback as the most preferred cartridge in F-class competitions with other .284 caliber (7mm) cartridge variants being wildcatted off the venerable original design (e.g., .284 KMR, .284 Shehane, .284 Wheeler, .284 Ackley Improved).

Many owners of old Swiss service rifles in the United States are also now reforming .284 Winchester cartridge cases up to produce results analogous to the more expensive 7.5×55mm Swiss GP11 cartridge.

The Finnish cartridge company Lapua started making .284 Winchester brass (Product No. 4 PH 7284), again, since Spring 2021.

== See also ==
- 7mm-08 Remington
- 7×57mm Mauser
- 7×64mm
- 7 mm Remington Magnum
- List of rebated rim cartridges
- List of rifle cartridges
- Table of handgun and rifle cartridges
- Delta L problem
