= ASAI AG =

Advanced Small Arms Industries AG
- Industry: Defense
- Founded: 1994
- Headquarters: Wettingen, Switzerland
- Products: Handguns
- Website: www.asai-ag.ch

Advanced Small Arms Industries AG or ASAI is a Swiss firearms manufacturer. Products manufactured include the One Pro 45 and One Pro 9.
