= 6.5-284 Norma =

Swedish rifle cartridge

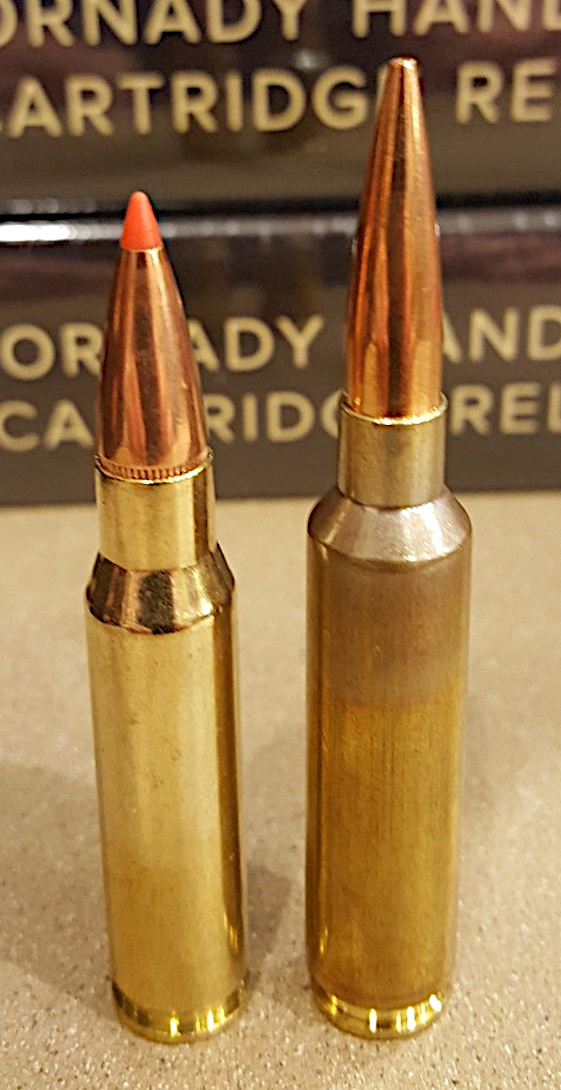
- .308 Winchester on the left, 6.5-284 Norma on the right
- Type: Rifle
- Place of origin: Sweden

Production history
- Designer: Norma
- Designed: 1999

Specifications
- Parent case: .284 Winchester
- Case type: rebated rim, straight walled bottleneck
- Bullet diameter: .264 in (6.7 mm)
- Neck diameter: .297 in (7.5 mm)
- Shoulder diameter: .475 in (12.1 mm)
- Base diameter: .501 in (12.7 mm)
- Rim diameter: .473 in (12.0 mm)
- Rim thickness: .054 in (1.4 mm)
- Case length: 2.170 in (55.1 mm)
- Overall length: 3.228 in (82.0 mm)
- Case capacity: 68.33 gr H_{2}O (4.428 cm^{3})

Ballistic performance
Bullet mass/type	Velocity	Energy
125 gr (8 g) Partition	3,000 ft/s (910 m/s)	2,497 ft⋅lbf (3,385 J)
142 gr (9 g) Hodgdon	2,850 ft/s (870 m/s)	2,557 ft⋅lbf (3,467 J)
- Test barrel length: 24; Source(s): ,

The 6.5-284 Norma (6.5x55mmRB Norma) originated as a wildcat cartridge based on the .284 Winchester cartridge necked down to 6.5 mm.

== History ==
The parent case .284 Winchester was created around 1963, but did not see extensive commercial use. The 6.5 caliber allowed for the use of long, aerodynamic bullets. In 1999, Norma submitted it to CIP. It has since been standardized as the 6.5mm-284 Norma.

== Use ==
The 6.5-284 has been used extensively in benchrest competitions and is known as an extremely accurate long range round. Using an improved version of the 6.5-284, Rich DeSimone set a 1,000-yard (914.4 m) world record with a 1.564-inch (39.73 mm) group. Rich DeSimone's 1,000-yard (914.4 m) record has been broken by Tom Sarver, who shot a 1.403-inch (35.64 mm) group in 2007 using a .300 Hulk wildcat cartridge that is based on the .338 Lapua Magnum cartridge. A 140 gr (9.1 g) bullet in this caliber is typically fired at 3,000 ft/s (914 m/s) to 3,100 ft/s (945 m/s).

== See also ==
- List of rebated rim cartridges
- List of rifle cartridges
- 6.5×55mm Swedish
- .260 Remington
- 6.5×47mm Lapua
- 6.5mm Creedmoor
