= Arsenal AD =

Bulgarian arms manufacturing company

- Type: Private
- Industry: Defense
- Founded: 1878; 148 years ago
- Headquarters: Kazanlak, Bulgaria
- Area served: Worldwide
- Key people: Nikolai Ibushev (President)
- Products: Firearms; Air defense equipment Artillery; Munitions; Explosives; ED devices Industrial machinery
- Net income: ▲€ 190,000,000 (2021)
- Number of employees: 10,500 (2022) (2010)
- Website: arsenal-bg.com

JSC Arsenal AD (Bulgarian: Арсенал АД) is a Bulgarian joint-stock company based in Kazanlak, engaged primarily in the manufacture of firearms and military equipment. It is Bulgaria's oldest arms supplier and the largest employer in the country besides the state, having 10,500 employees.

== History ==
The company's history can be traced back to 1878 with the first armory in the country - the Ruse Artillery Arsenal. Due to strategic concerns, it was relocated to Sofia in 1891. After the nation's defeat in the Second Balkan War and World War I, in 1924 the company and all of its equipment were relocated to Kazanlak, a town situated in central Bulgaria. The armory was given the name Darzhavna voenna fabrika ("State Military Factory").

Initially producing only artillery gun components and ammunition, the factory later began to manufacture gas masks (1920s), nitroglycerin (1930s), machine tools (1940s) and finally assault rifles, optic sights and B-10 recoilless rifles (1950s). The first assault rifle, a direct copy of the Soviet AK-47, was produced in 1958. By the 1960s, a total of seven factories were under the company's jurisdiction. Until the Fall of Communism in 1989-1990, the company was named Mashinostroitelen kombinat Fridrih Engels ("Friedrich Engels Machinery Works") to conceal its activities as a military enterprise. As part of this strategy, it adopted the manufacture of various civilian products, including automobiles such as the then-popular Bulgarrenault-8. In the late 1980s and early 1990s, Arsenal began cooperation with companies from Japan, Sweden, Ukraine and Germany.

Currently, Arsenal AD is a private company conducting international arms trade, although it also expands its civilian exports, now including high-precision metalworking machinery, mobile robot manipulators and synthetic diamonds.

== Current military production ==
=== Pistols ===
- Arsenal Compact
- Makarov

=== Submachine guns ===
- Shipka SMG (9×18mm Makarov / 9×19mm Parabellum)

=== Light Machine Guns ===
- LMG/LMG-F - RPK variants in 7.62×39mm, 5.45×39mm or 5.56×45mm NATO chambering

=== General Purpose Machine Guns ===
- MG-M1/1M/M1S/1MS/1MS/1MV- Licensed PK machine gun chambered in 7.62×54mmR.
- MG-M2/M2S/ - PK machine gun modification chambered in 7.62x51mm NATO. The M2S variant has a tripod.

=== Grenade launchers ===
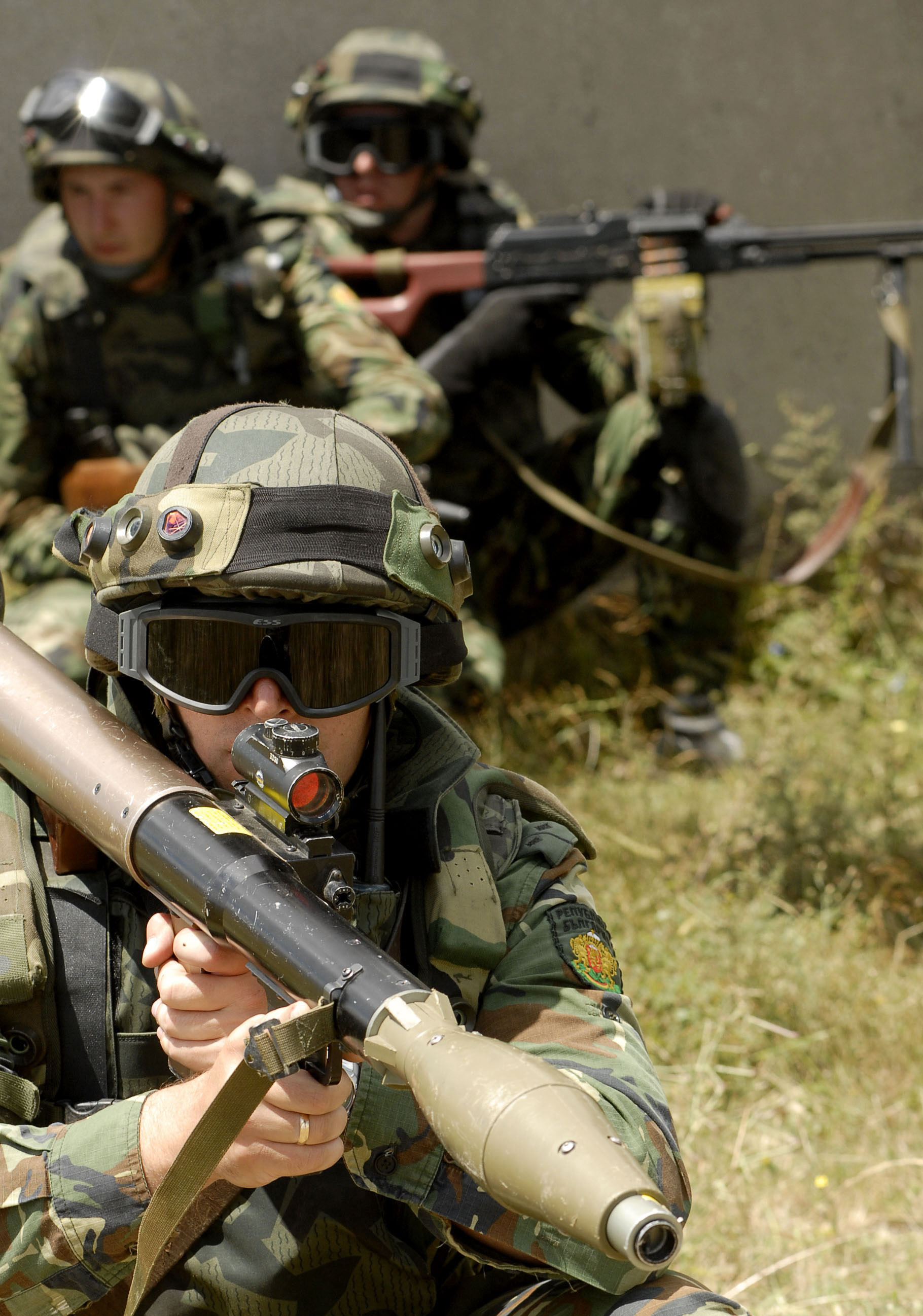
A Bulgarian soldier with an ATGL-L, equipped with a red dot reflex sight.

- Lavina - 40mm semi-automatic revolver-type grenade launcher;
- Arsenal MSGL - 40×46mm multi-shot grenade launcher; somewhat similar to the Milkor MGL
- UBGL series - underbarrel grenade launchers for all AR and AK series of assault rifles, the Bushmaster M4 Type Carbine, M4 carbine and M16 rifles
- ATGL-L - a lighter RPG-7 version with a more powerful warhead and a red dot sight;
- ATGL-H - a heavier SPG-9 copy with a higher muzzle velocity;
- AGL-30M - a heavier, more durable variant of the AGS-17 Plamya

=== Mortars ===
- M60MA - 60mm mortar
- M60CMA - 60mm commando mortar (handheld)
- M81MA - 81mm mortar
- M82MA - 82mm mortar

=== Air Defense Systems ===
- ADS - ZU-23-2 variant with advanced sights and a computerized fire control system
- ADS-N - Navy version

=== Other firearms and products ===
- BARR series - bolt-action hunting rifles, based on AK series;
- SAR series - semi-automatic hunting rifles
- HE-FRAG and flash bang grenades

=== Munitions ===
- Small arms ammunition - 9×18mm Makarov, 9×19mm Parabellum, 5.56×45mm NATO, 7.62×39mm, 7.62×51mm NATO, 7.62×54mmR
- Artillery rounds - 23×115mm, 23×152mmB, 30×165mm
- Rounds for grenade launchers - 30mm for AGS-17 and AGS-30, 40x46mm low velocity, 40mm VOG-25, 40x53mm high velocity
- Rounds for anti-tank systems - RPG-7, SPG-9, 2A28
- Mortar bombs - 60mm, 81mm, 82mm and 120mm
- Hand grenades
- Unguided aviation rockets

== Other products ==
- Computer Numerical Control (CNC) equipment
- Cemented Carbide Inserts
- Cemented Carbide Tips
- Cemented Carbide Special Tools
- Hunting Powders "Sokol", "Mars", "Magia"
- Nitrocellulose for Lacquer Production
- Nitrocellulose for Dynamite Production

== See also ==
- TEREM, another Bulgarian arms manufacturing company
- Mars Armor Ltd, a Bulgarian ballistic protection manufacturing company
- Defense industry of Bulgaria
