= Armscor (Philippines) =

Firearms manufacturer

Armscor Global Defense, Inc.
- Formerly: Squires Bingham Manufacturing, Inc.
- Type: Private
- Industry: Arms industry
- Founded: 1905; 121 years ago
- Founder: Ray Squires; William Bingham
- Headquarters: Marikina, Metro Manila, Philippines
- Area served: Worldwide
- Key people: Martin Tuason (President)
- Products: Firearms, ammunition
- Subsidiaries: Armscor International, Inc.
- Website: armscor.com

Armscor Global Defense, Inc. is a firearms manufacturing company based in the Philippines. It is known for its inexpensive 1911-pattern pistols, revolvers, shotguns, sporting rifles, firearms parts and ammunition. Armscor, whose manufacturing facility is located in Marikina, produces about 200,000 firearms and some 420 million rounds of ammunition a year, where 80 percent of this is exported and sold to over 60 countries. The company was known as the Arms Corporation of the Philippines (Armscor) until 2017.

The company has been headquartered in Marikina, Philippines since 1958 and represented in the United States by its subsidiary Armscor International, Inc., located in Pahrump, Nevada with facilities in Stevensville, Montana.

== History ==
Former logo of Armscor.

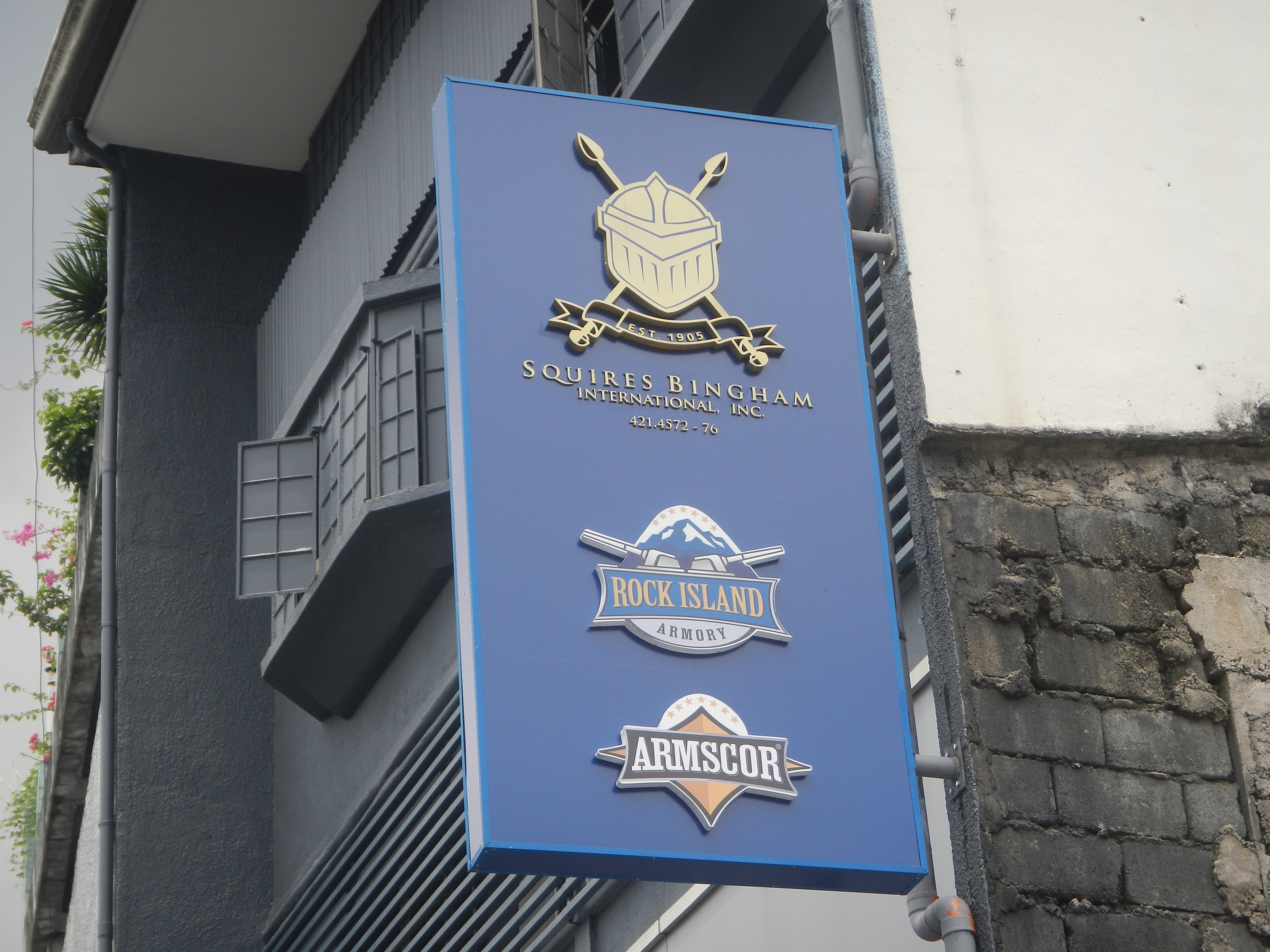
Logos of Armscor affiliates, Squires Bingham International and Rock Island Armory, as well as the logo of the company itself.

Armscor traces its roots back to a Manila print shop, Squires Bingham & Co., founded in 1905. The print shop later imported and sold motorcycles and various sporting goods, which included some firearms and ammunition. The company was bought by the Tuason family in 1941 and began making firearms through the present corporation in 1952, being renamed Squires Bingham Manufacturing, Inc. in the same year. Armscor manufactures its own line of firearms and holds manufacturing contracts for other companies' firearm lines, such as Twin Pines' Rock Island Armory (RIA) pistols. In addition to the Rock Island Armory 1911 series pistols, Armscor is the source of pistols for STI's Spartan, Cimarron Firearms pre-1923 Model 1911, and Charles Daly 1911 style pistols. Armscor is an ISO 9001 certified compliant company which manufactures weapons using CNC (Computer Numerical Control) equipment.

Armscor became a registered trademark on February 24, 2009.

In December 2013, Armscor reported interest in the 4th Brunei Darussalam Defense Exhibition (BRIDEX) to provide arms and ammo for the Bruneian police and military.

In 2017, Armscor provided firearms and ammo to the AFP in response in the fighting in Marawi.

In August 2019, the company was named by the United Nations' Independent International Fact-Finding Mission on Myanmar (IIFFMM) for selling competition pistols to soldiers in the Tatmadaw Shooting Team from August 2018.

In June 2024, the company has begun to market its first assault rifle, the Torch/RD4.

On July 7, 2025, an explosion occurred at Armscor's production facility in Marikina, killing two workers and injuring another. The incident was blamed on a primer that detonated while the victims were making bullets.

== Rock Island Armory ==
Rock Island Armory, founded in 1977, was a United States-based company located in Colona, Illinois and owned by David Reese (of Springfield Armory, Inc.). It derived its name from the nearby US Army Rock Island Arsenal and sold military surplus from the base but the two were not formally associated. Rock Island Armory, Inc. was acquired by Armscor in 1985 but several firearms continue to be sold under the Rock Island Armory name.

== Ownership/Management ==
Armscor is owned by the Squires Bingham Co. Inc, a holding company for the family of Don Celso Tuason. Don Celso's eldest son Demetrio "Bolo" Tuason is the Chairman Emeritus. Younger brother Daniel "Concoy" oversees production and plant operation. Bolo's son, Martin, who died on November 21, 2025, was the president and CEO of the company.

== Products ==
While it is primarily known as a manufacturer of M1911 pistols, Armscor manufactures and markets a number of other handgun, revolver, shotgun and rifle models as well as ammunition and accessories.

=== Revolvers ===
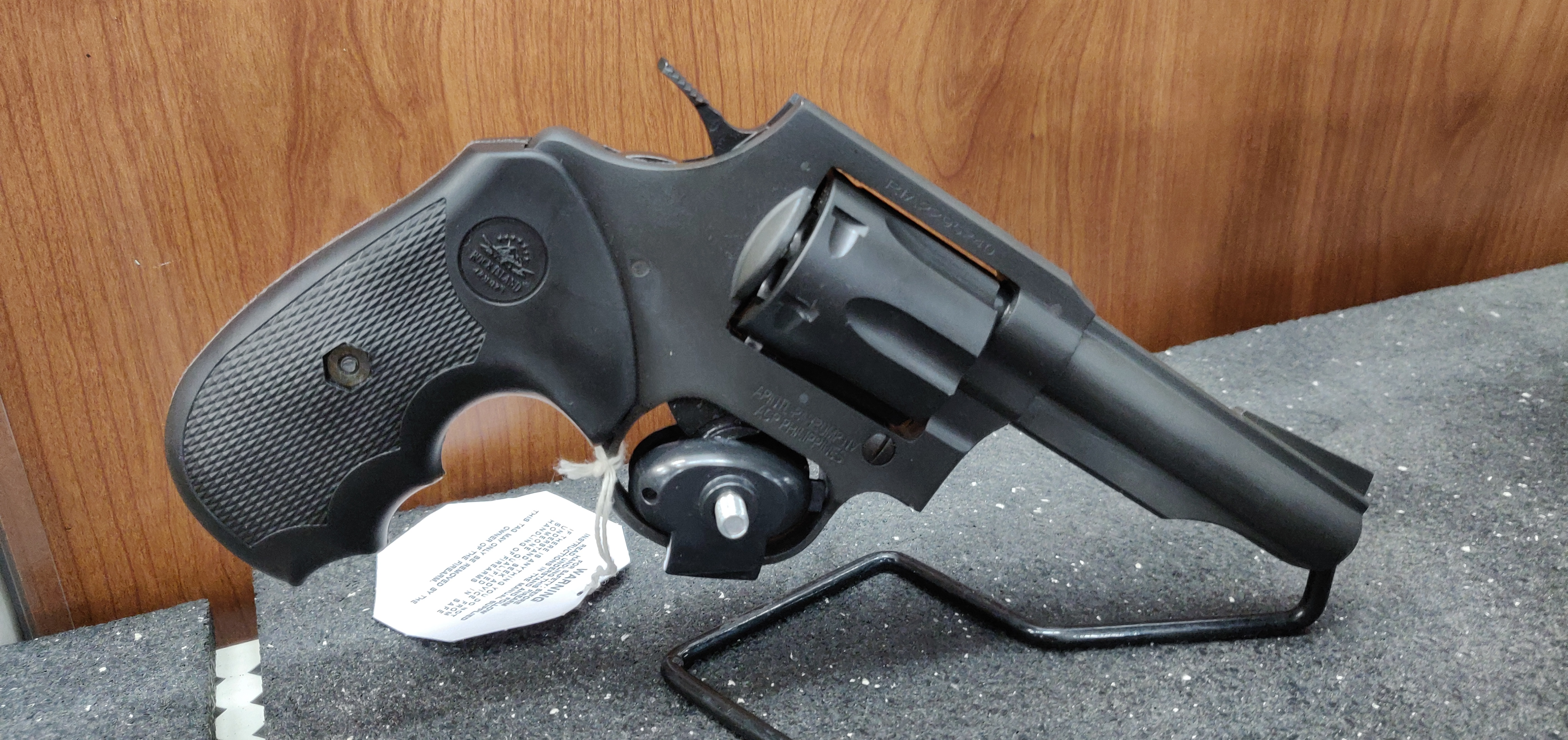
Rock Island Armory M200

- M200
- M202
- M206

=== Semi-Automatics ===
Traditionally, Armscor's portfolio of handgun products have been based on the Colt M1911A1 design. In recent years the company has diversified its line-up with other designs such as the Tanfoglio Combat and Force pistols, and has developed striker-fired designs such as the STK100 (based on the Glock design) and the RIA 5.0, an original design developed by gunsmith Fred Craig.

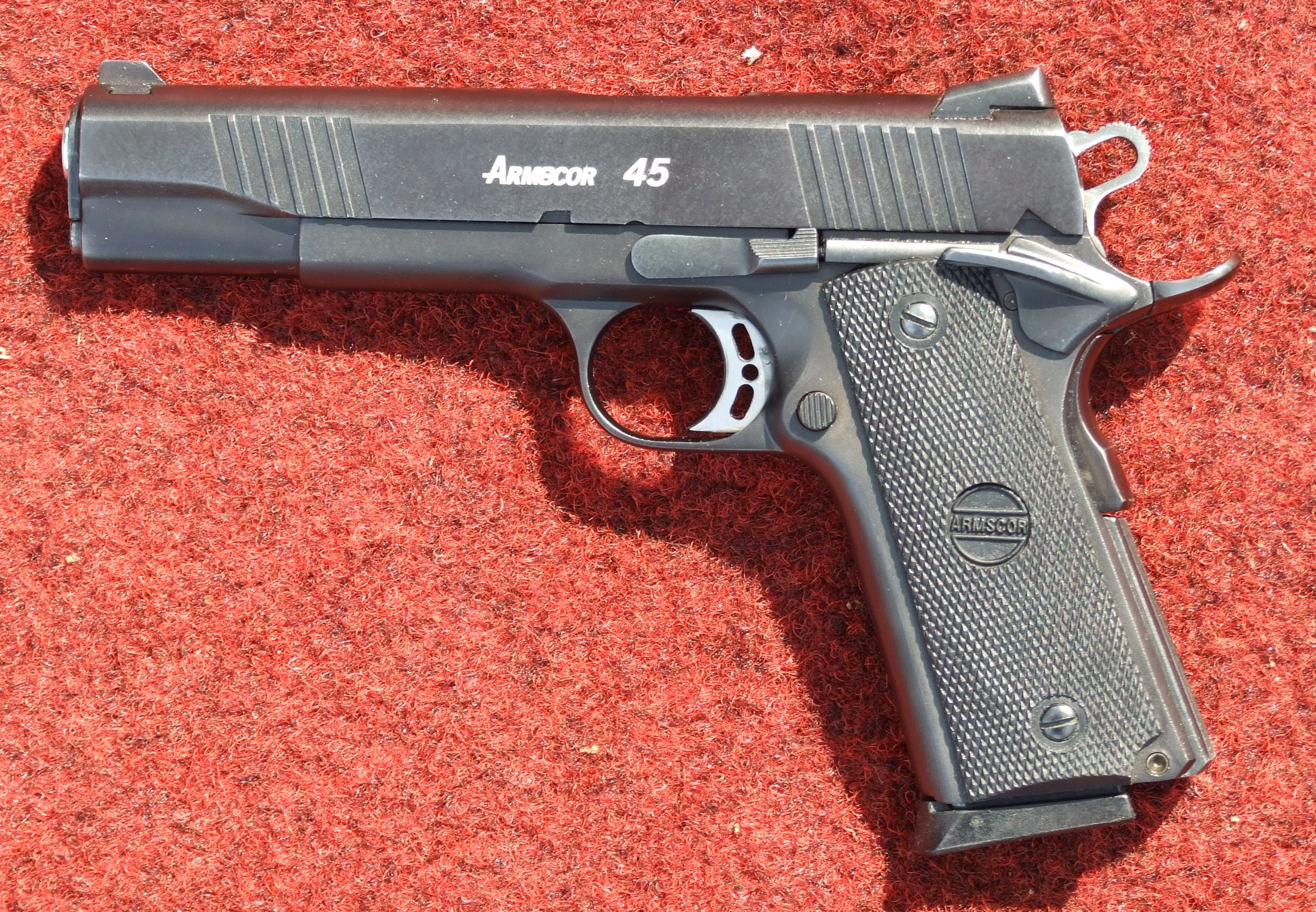
Armscor 1911A1-FS PS .45

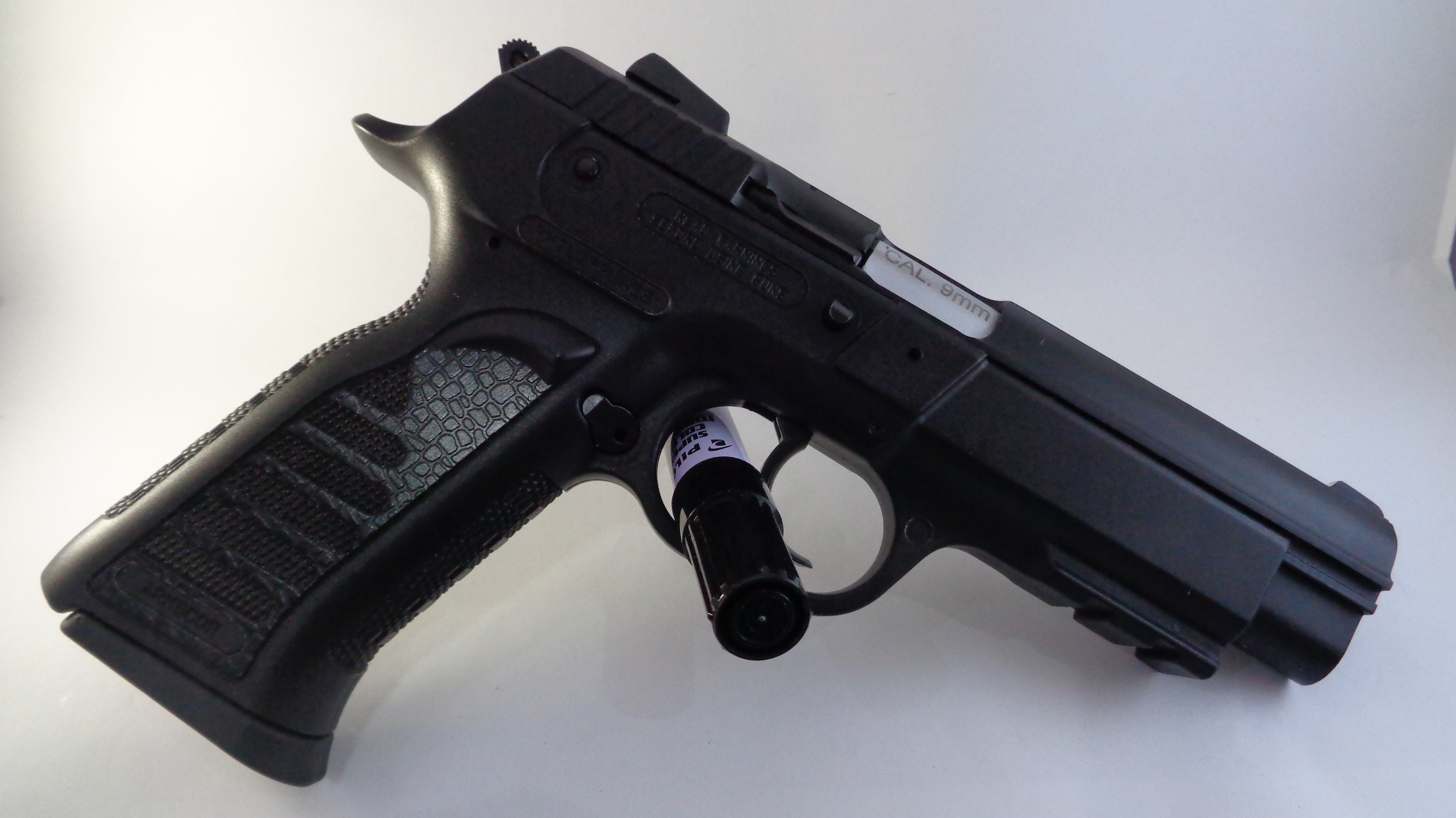
Armscor MAPP1

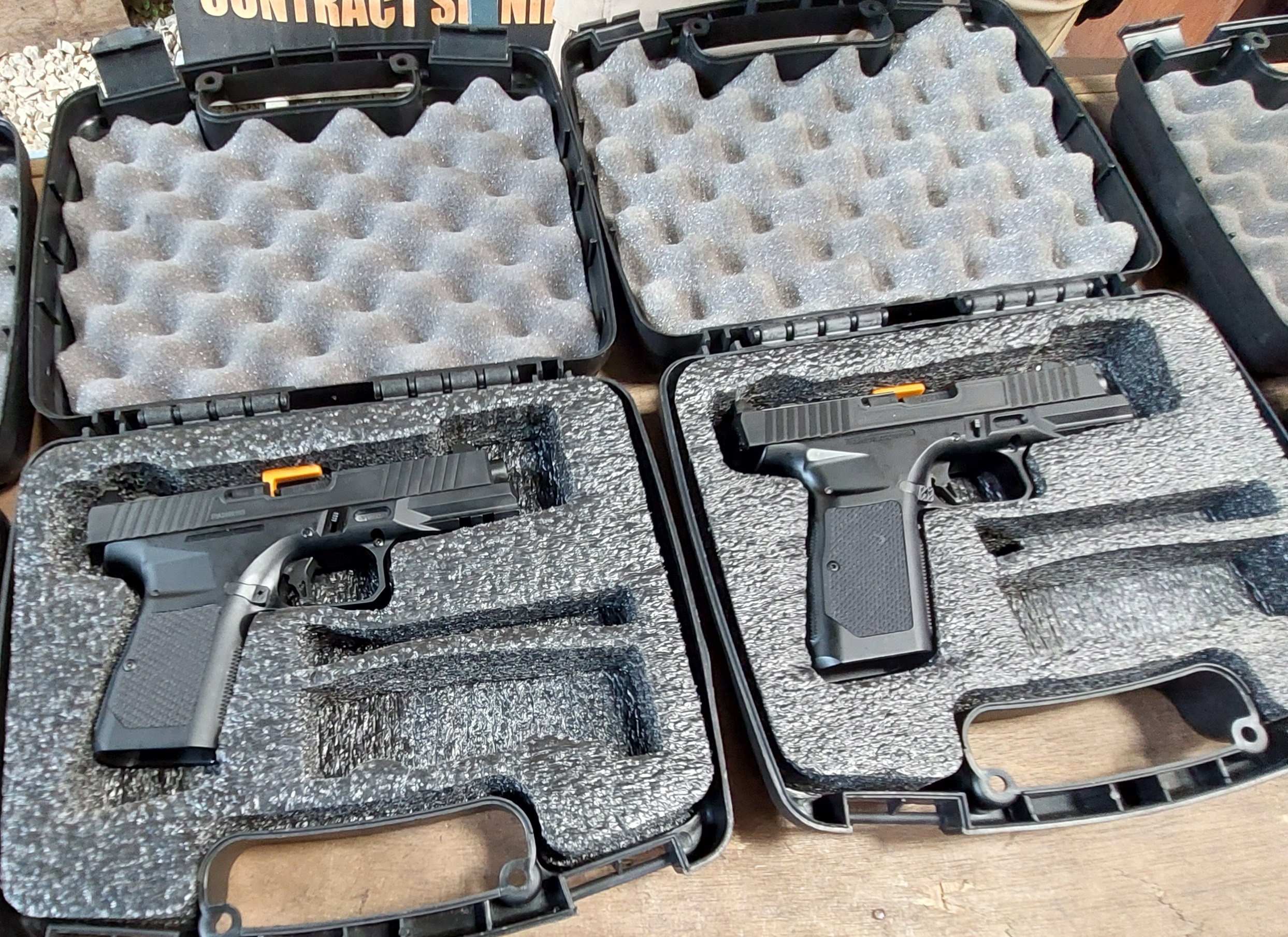
Armscor STK150 & STK200 pistols

- 1911 Tactical Series
- 2011 Tactical Series
- 22 TCM/Micro Mag Series
- GI Series
- MAP/MAPP Series
- Match Series
- XT 22 Series
- STK100 Series
- RIA 5.0 Series

=== Shotguns ===
- M30 (based on High Standard Flite King )
- VR60
- VR80
- TPAS 1897 (based on Ithaca 37)

=== Rifles ===
The company has been making bolt-action and rimfire rifles since 1980. In 2024, the company announced its first 5.56 rifle line.

- M1400E
- M1400TS
- M1500TM
- M1600
- M1700
- MAK 22 (Also known as AK 22)
- MIG 22 Standard
- MIG 22 Target
- TCM 22 Rifle
- Torch Series

== Innovations ==
Armscor introduced a new proprietary caliber named the .22 TCM (Tuason Craig Micromag) based on the 1911 pistol. The cartridge is essentially a 5.56×45mm NATO cartridge shortened to 1.265 in. total length with a 40-grain jacketed hollow point bullet. Its main characteristics are its high velocity and low recoil, allowing for repeated accurate shots.

More recently, the company has released a bolt-action rifle chambered for this cartridge.

== AFP (Armscor) Arsenal Battalion ==
Due to the nature of the business of Armscor, it has been tapped by the Armed Forces of the Philippines to be one of its partners as an "Affiliate Reserve Unit". The company was designated as the 1st (Armscor) Arsenal Battalion (Reserve) and placed under the operational control of the Armed Forces of the Philippines Reserve Command.

== See also ==
- PROGUN
