= Akdal Ghost TR01 =

Akdal Ghost
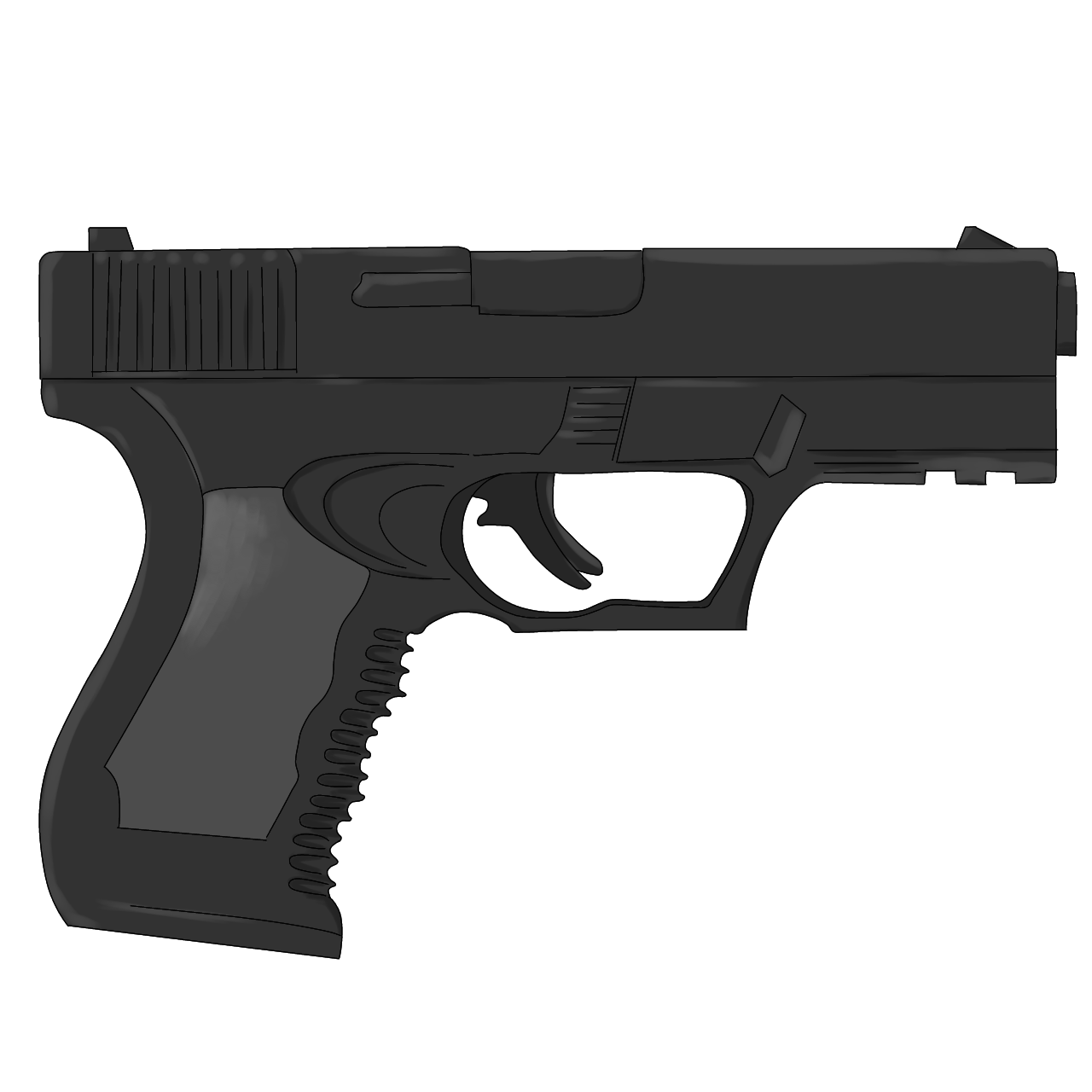
- Type: Semi-automatic pistol
- Place of origin: Turkey

Production history
- Designer: ÜçYıldız Arms Ltd Inc
- Designed: 1990
- Manufacturer: Akdal Arms
- Produced: 1990–present

Specifications
- Mass: 750 g (26 oz)
- Length: 190 mm (7.5 in)
- Barrel length: 113 mm (4.4 in)
- Width: 30 mm (1.2 in)
- Height: 135 mm (5.3 in)
- Cartridge: 9×19mm Parabellum
- Action: Short recoil operated, vertically cammed barrel
- Muzzle velocity: 360 m/s (1,181 ft/s)
- Effective firing range: 60 m
- Feed system: 15-round detachable box magazine
- Sights: Fixed, front blade and rear notch 160 mm (6.3 in) sight radius

The Ghost TR01 is a compact semi-automatic pistol designed by Akdal Arms of Turkey. It was designed as a pistol for security and law enforcement personnel rather than the military market. The TR01 is very much like the Glock 17 and shares many similarities.

== Design details ==
The Akdal has been designed with high ergonomic quality with a comfortable grip and well balanced weight. The TR01 uses a short recoil operated locking breech mechanism which is also seen in Glock 17s. The locking breech is based on the Glock 17's Browning model in which the barrel engages the slide with a single lug, entering the ejection window. The pistol utilises a pre-cocked striker, which takes some of the workload off the shooter by allowing the trigger to be pulled less to fire off a shot.

The pistol has several safety mechanisms to prevent a misfire or accidental discharge. These include a trigger safety, a firing pin safety, decocking indicator and a chamber indicator. The rounds in the magazine are double stacked, which allows for twice as many rounds because there are two rows as opposed to the one in a single-stacked magazine.

The sights for the pistol are fixed, but a Picatinny rail can be fitted in front of the trigger guard or in front of the ejection port for a laser or Aimpoint sight. Finally, the stock is made of lightweight polymer and the barrel has six right-hand rifling grooves.

== Aftermath ==
The Turkish armed forces prefer to use the Yavuz 16 which has recently passed military trials and is in service with a few regiments. The TR01 was introduced in 1990 and continues to be produced.

== See also ==
- Walther P99
- Glock 17
