= ASAI One Pro 45 =

One Pro 45, onepro.45, one PRO.45
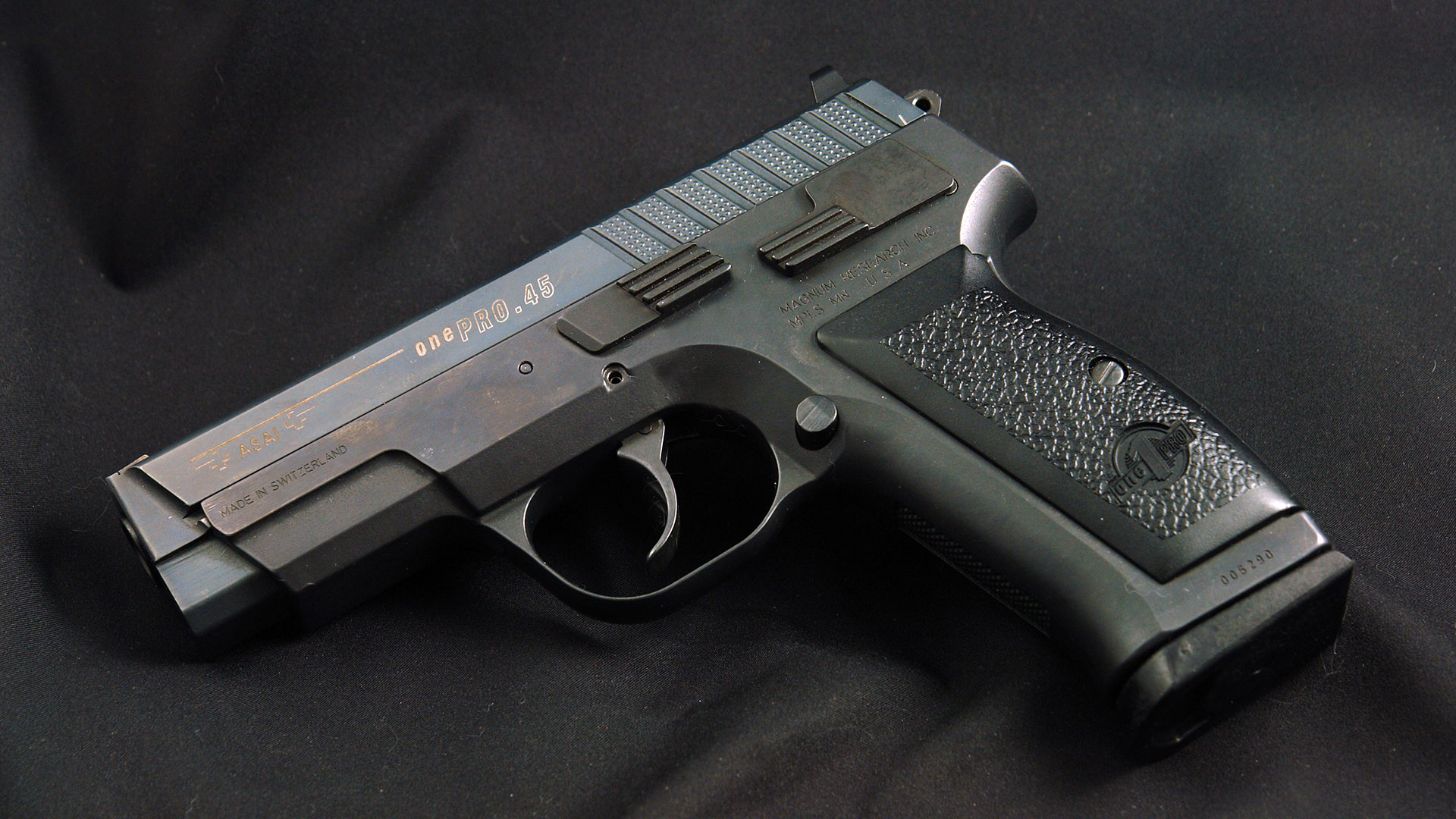
- ASAI One Pro
- Type: Semi-automatic pistol
- Place of origin: Switzerland

Production history
- Manufacturer: ASAI AG

Specifications
- Mass: 1,100 g (39 oz) (unloaded steel frame); 830 g (29 oz) (unloaded alloy frame)
- Length: 179 mm (7.0 in); 199 mm (7.8 in) (IPSC model)
- Barrel length: 95 mm (3.7 in); 115 mm (4.5 in) (IPSC model)
- Width: 32 mm (1.3 in)
- Height: 135 mm (5.3 in)
- Cartridge: .45 ACP.400 Cor-Bon
- Feed system: 10-round detachable magazine

The One-Pro 45 (stylized as onepro.45 or one PRO.45) is a semi-automatic pistol chambered in .45 ACP (with some variants in .400 Cor-Bon) and manufactured in Wettingen, (previously Solothurn) Switzerland. It was at one time imported into the United States by Magnum Research and into Italy by ALGIMEC.
