= Winchester Model 100 =

- Type: Semi-automatic rifle
- Place of origin: United States

Production history
- Manufacturer: Winchester Repeating Arms Company
- Produced: 1961–1973
- No. built: 262,838

Specifications
- Mass: 7.5 pounds (3.4 kg)
- length: 22 inches (56 cm)

The Winchester Model 100 is a semi-automatic rifle manufactured by Winchester Repeating Arms Company. It was first introduced in 1961, and was manufactured until 1973. A total of approximately 262,838 were manufactured. Variants of the weapon are capable of firing a .308, .243, or .284 Winchester cartridge. The barrel is 22 inches (56 cm) long. It was also available in a Carbine with a 19" barrel. The rifle weighs 7.5 pounds (3.4 kg).

== Recall ==
In 1990, Winchester issued a recall for this rifle due to a tendency for the firing pin to break due to metal fatigue, and become lodged in the breech bolt face, causing the rifle to fire with the action not fully locked, leading to possible catastrophic failure and risk of severe injury or death to the shooter. Winchester offered to do repairs on the gun free of charge.
