= Astra A-70 =

- Type: Semi-automatic pistol
- Place of origin: Spain

Production history
- Designed: before 1991
- Manufacturer: Astra-Unceta y Cia SA
- Produced: 1991–1994

Specifications
- Mass: 840 g (30 oz)
- Length: 177 mm (7.0 in)
- Barrel length: 89 mm (3.5 in)
- Cartridge: 9×19mm Parabellum; .40 S&W
- Feed system: Detachable box magazine: 8 (9×19mm Parabellum), 7 (40 S&W)
- Sights: Fixed front, Fixed rear.

The Astra A-70 is a single-action locked breech semi-automatic pistol at one time produced in Spain by Astra-Unceta y Cia SA. The Astra A-70 is a compact pistol designed for those that need more firepower than offered by the Astra Constable. It has a weight of 31 oz, OAL of 6.5 inch, 4.75 inch in height and 1.5 inch wide with a 3.5 inch barrel. The Astra A-70 is an 8-shot, single action recoil operated semi-automatic with a right side only thumb safety. It has fixed combat sights. The Astra A-70 uses three safeties: a firing pin safety that prevents the firing pin from engaging unless the trigger is deliberately pulled, a manual thumb safety, and a hammer safety.
