= Armscor M200 =

Philippine revolver

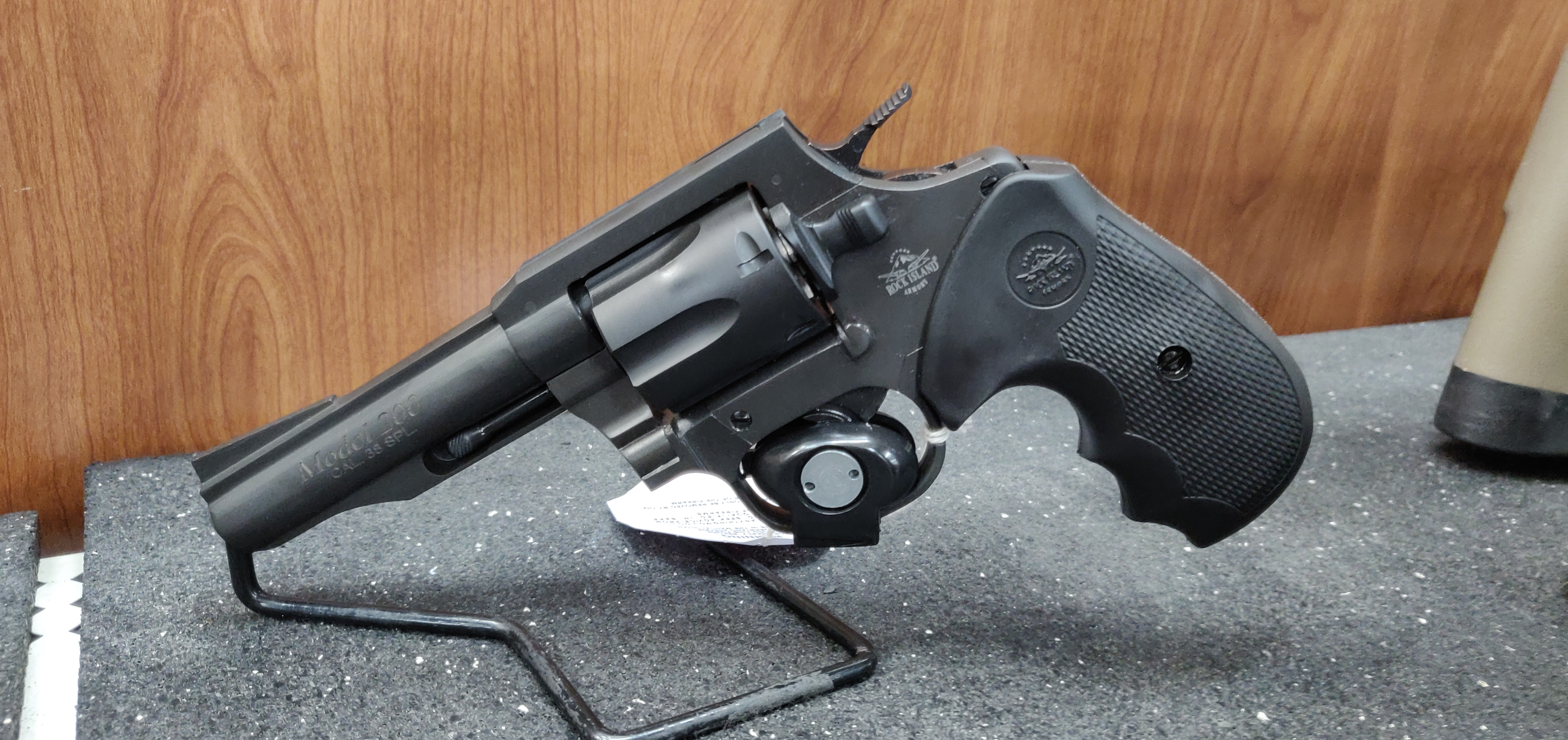
- Place of origin: Philippines

Production history
- Manufacturer: Armscor
- Unit cost: $249 (M200, 2024 MSRP); $256 (M202, 2023 MSRP); $259 (M206, 2024 MSRP)
- Variants: M202, M206

Specifications
- Mass: 1.76 lb (800 g) (M200, unloaded); 1.625 lb (737 g) (M202, unloaded); 1.5 lb (680 g) (M206, unloaded)
- Length: 8.875 in (225.4 mm) (M200); 8.625 in (219.1 mm) (M202); 6.75 in (171 mm) (M206)
- Barrel length: 4 in (100 mm) (M200, M202); 2 in (51 mm) (M206)
- Height: 5.46 in (139 mm) (M200); 4.67 in (119 mm) (M206)
- Cartridge: .38 Special
- Action: Double-action revolver
- Muzzle velocity: 728–835 feet per second (222–255 m/s)
- Feed system: 6-round cylinder
- Sights: Fixed iron sights

The Armscor M200 or Rock Island Armory M200 is a double-action revolver made by Armscor in the Philippines. It is chambered for the .38 Special cartridge. The revolver utilizes a transfer bar safety and comes with black, polymer combat grips.

== Variants ==
=== M206 ===
The M206 variant has a 2-inch barrel and is available with or without a hammer in a nickel or parkerized finish.
