= Arms Tech Limited =

Firearms manufacturing company

- Company type: Private
- Industry: Firearms and firearm accessories
- Headquarters: Phoenix, Arizona
- Products: Automatic weapons Precision rifles Ordnance; Semi-automatic pistols Shotguns
- Website: www.armstechltd.com

Arms Tech Limited is a firearms manufacturing company located in Phoenix, Arizona established in 1987. The company says that its mission is to support the U.S. Military Special operations community. The company manufactures an array of firearms designed to military specifications.

== Products ==
Arms Tech Limited manufactures a variety of weapons designed for specific military needs. Their product line consists of primarily rifles, but they also manufacture a few semi-automatic pistols. Arms Tech manufactures weapons in a host of calibers, including: 5.56×45mm NATO, 7.62×51mm NATO, .50 BMG, .300 Winchester Magnum, and .22 LR, among others. A few of their weapons are specialized takedown guns, made for military applications where mission requirements may limit the size of a weapon that can be carried.
