= Astra Model 900 =

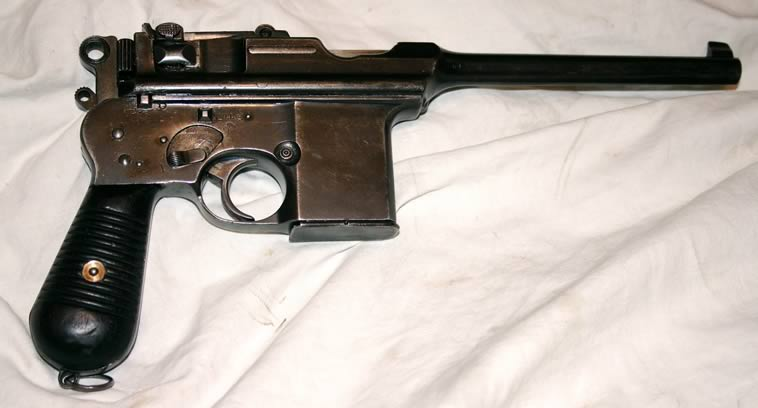
- An Astra 903 pistol.
- Type: Semi-automatic pistol Machine pistol (Astra Model 902 and Astra Model 904)
- Place of origin: Kingdom of Spain

Service history
- In service: 1927–1945
- Used by: See Users
- Wars: Northern Expedition; Second Sino-Japanese War; Spanish Civil War; World War II

Production history
- Manufacturer: Astra-Unceta y Cia SA
- No. built: 35,076 (all versions)
- Variants: 900, 901, 902, 903, 904

Specifications
- Mass: 1.275 kg (Astra 903)
- Length: 308 mm (Astra 903)
- Barrel length: 160 mm (Astra 903)
- Height: 150 mm (Astra 903)
- Cartridge: 7.63×25mm Mauser; 9mm Largo
- Caliber: 7.63mm 9mm
- Muzzle velocity: 461.28 m/s (1,513.4 ft/s)
- Maximum firing range: 1,000 m (1,100 yd)
- Feed system: 10, 20 round box magazine
- Sights: Iron

The Astra Model 900 is one of many Spanish copies of the German Mauser C96 semi-automatic pistol. It shares the same caliber, magazine capacity, and holster type and is generally very similar to the German handgun.

== History ==
The Spanish gunmaker Astra-Unceta y Cia began producing a copy of the Mauser C.96 in 1927 that was externally similar to the C96 (including the presence of a detachable shoulder stock/holster) but with non-interlocking internal parts. It was produced until 1941, with a production hiatus in 1937 and 1938, and a final batch assembled from spare parts in 1951.

The Spanish copies of the C96 were generally intended for export to China, but after the commencement of the Sino-Japanese war, the remaining Astra 900s were used in the Spanish Civil War, and numbers were also sold to Germany in the period 1940–1943.

== Design ==
The Basque-manufactured Astra-Unceta y Cia SA Astra 901 is a compact machine pistol, with a magazine capacity of 10 7.63×25mm Mauser cartridges, which is a considerably smaller capacity than is standard for a machine pistol. The next model, the Astra 902, was provided with a fixed magazine of 20 cartridges and a lengthened barrel, and Astra 903 had a removable magazine instead of the usual fixed one. Astra later added a mechanism to slow the rate of fire and make the gun more manageable (to an extent) when being fired on full-auto or burst modes, calling this the Model 904.

The Model 904 is comparable to the German Mauser M712 'Schnellfeuer' Broomhandle pistols, having a detachable magazine, automatic fire capabilities, and general appearance.

The Astra Model 904 was produced in a 9mm Largo variant, the Astra Model 904E, which was identical to the Model 904 in all other respects.

== Production and distribution ==
The following models were made by Astra:

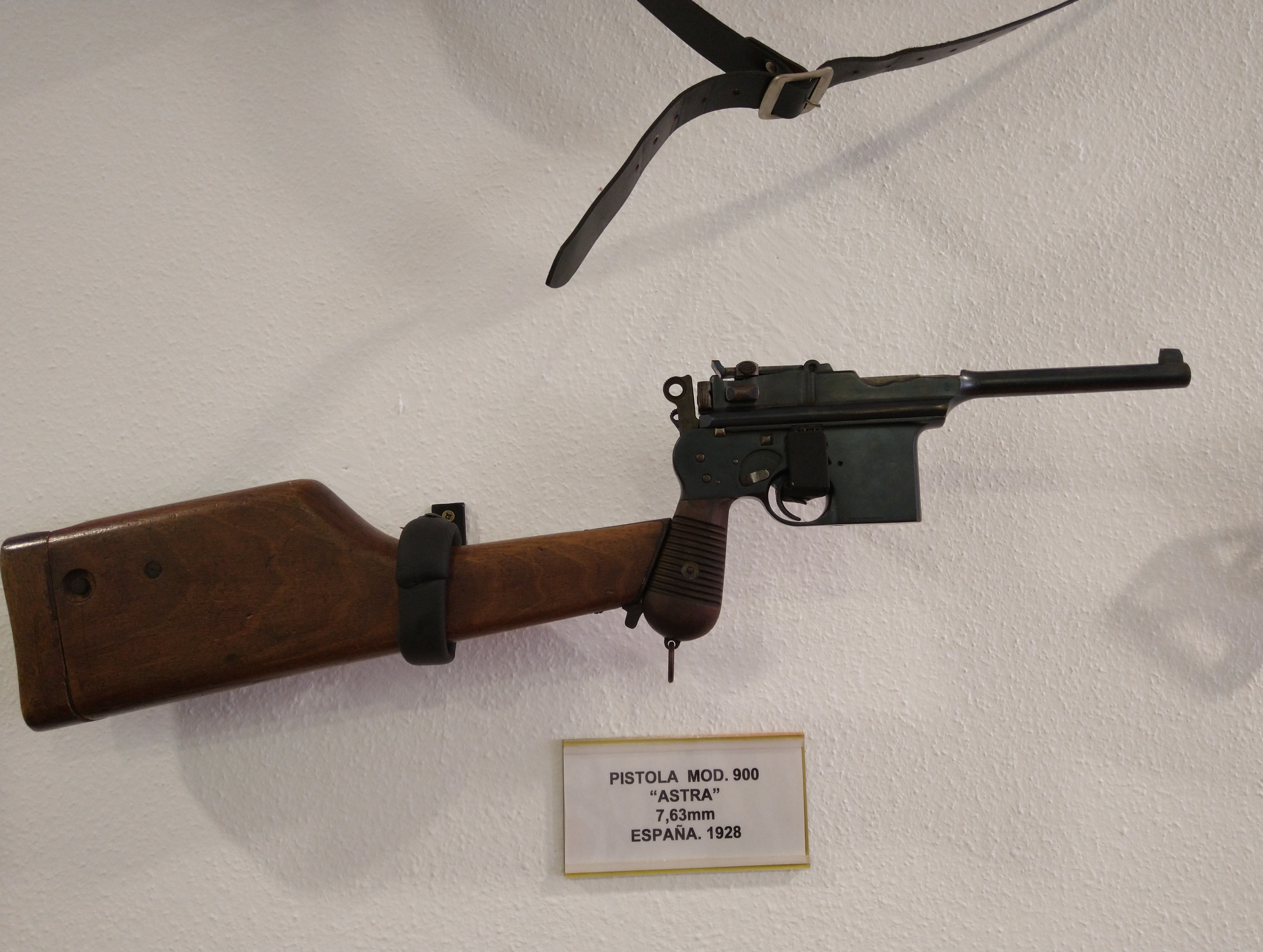
Astra 900 with shoulder stock.

- Astra 900: 21,000 weapons from 1927 to 1941 for China, Latin America, Spanish Republicans, and the Wehrmacht (1,050 delivered in 1943).
- Astra 901: 1,655 weapons in 1928, destined mainly for China.
- Astra 902: 7,075 weapons in 1928 to 1933. Some delivered to China, others delivered to the Wehrmacht in 1943.
- Astra 903: 3,082 weapons in 1932 to 1934. Same users as the 902.
- Astra 904: 90+ weapons in 1934.
- Astra F: 1,126 weapons in 1936. Issued to the Guardia Civil during Spanish Civil War.
- Astra E: 548 weapons assembled between 1949, 1951 and 1961 from stored parts. Reserved for export to Egypt, India, Iraq and Pakistan.
- 8 × Astra 900, 12 × Astra 902, and 9 × Astra 400, all richly engraved, were presented to Joseph Stalin during the Spanish Civil War in 1937.

== Users ==
- Republic of China (1912–1949)
- Empire of Japan
- Nazi Germany
- Second Spanish Republic: Astra Fs known to be issued to the Guardia Civil.
