= TEREM =

TEREM - HOLDING JSC (Cyrillic: ТЕРЕМ) is a state-owned company of the Bulgarian Ministry of Defence specialized in repairs, modernization and logistical support of aviation equipment, ships and vessels, armored vehicles, small arms, artillery and missiles weapons, ammunition, radar and communication equipment.

== Subsidiaries ==
Terem JSC is the sole shareholder of:

- TEREM – Letets LTD. - Sofia - repair of aircraft, helicopters and aviation equipment.
- TEREM-SHIPYARD Flotski Arsenal - Varna LTD. - repair of ships, refurbishment and modernization of vessels; Armament and equipment for the Navy.
- TEREM – Ovech LTD. - Provadia - overhaul and repair of automotive and armored vehicles.
- TEREM - Khan Krum LTD. - Targovishte - repair of armored vehicles, tanks, automobile engines and spare parts production.
- TEREM – Ivailo LTD. - Veliko Tarnovo - overhaul and repair of small arms, artillery, rocket weapons and all types of missile systems.
- TEREM - Tsar Samuil LTD. - Kostenets - production and utilization of ammunition.
