= Armscor M1600 =

Armscor Model M1600
- Type: Semi-automatic rifle

Production history
- Manufacturer: Armscor

Specifications
- Mass: 6.5 lb (2.9 kg)
- Length: 39 in (990 mm)
- Cartridge: .22 LR
- Action: Semi-automatic, recoil operated
- Muzzle velocity: 1,247 feet per second
- Feed system: 10 or 15 round magazine
- Sights: Iron sights

The Armscor M1600 is a semi-automatic rifle made by Armscor (formerly Squires Bingham Co.) chambered in .22 LR. The rifle bears a superficial resemblance to the AR-15/M16 family of firearms, although with no interchangeability of parts.

There are some prominent differences between the two. For example, the carry handle on the M1600 in .22 LR is considerably smaller and moved further forward along the body of the rifle than the Colt, and the stock of the Armscor model is made of wood as opposed to plastic. There is also a model with a collapsible stock (designated M1600R). The rifle was conceived out of want of an M16-like rifle in .22 caliber for plinking.

As compared to the AR-15, chambered in 5.56x45mm cartridge, the M1600 has far less recoil, as it is correspondingly weaker. As with other .22 caliber rifles, this rifle is suitable for hunting small game.
