= HS Produkt VHS =

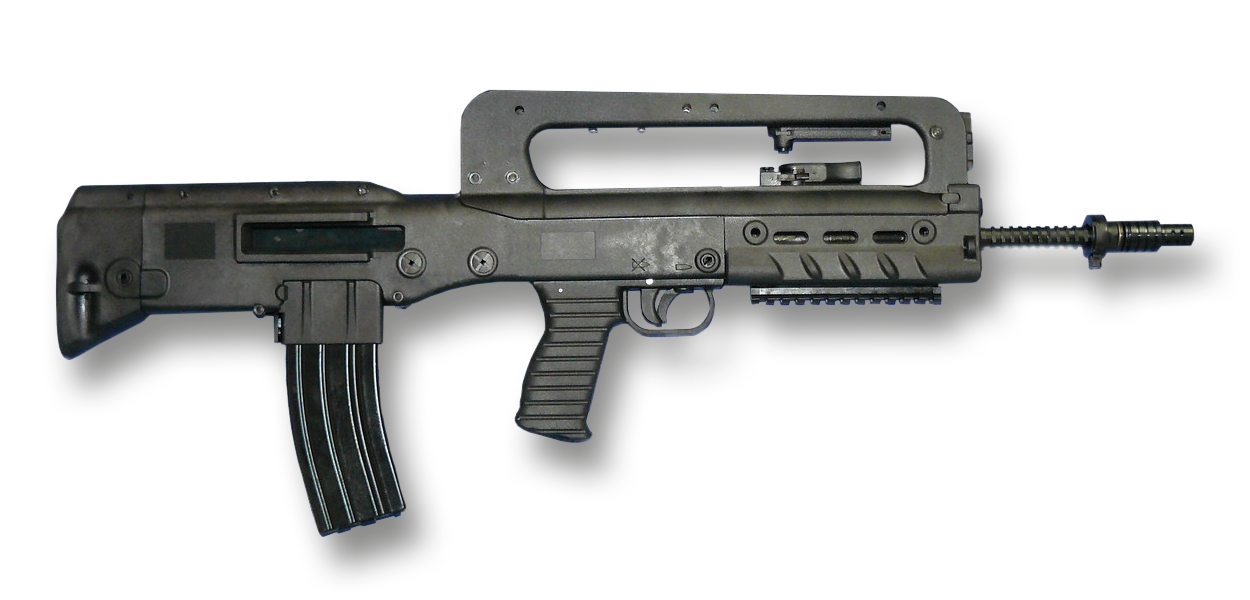
- HS Produkt VHS-D assault rifle
- Type: Bullpup assault rifle
- Place of origin: Croatia

Service history
- In service: 2009–present
- Used by: See Users
- Wars: Syrian Civil War; War in Iraq (2013–2017)

Production history
- Designer: Marko Vuković
- Designed: 2003–present
- Manufacturer: HS Produkt
- Unit cost: c. €1453
- Produced: 2005–present
- Variants: See Variants

Specifications
- Mass: VHS-D: 3.4 kg (7.50 lb); VHS-K: 3.3 kg (7.3 lb)
- Length: VHS-D: 765 mm (30.1 in); VHS-K: 665 mm (26.2 in)
- Barrel length: VHS-D: 500 mm (19.7 in); VHS-K: 410 mm (16.1 in)
- Width: 43 mm (1.7 in)
- Height: 230 mm (9.1 in) (without magazine); 260 mm (10.2 in) (20-round mag); 300 mm (11.8 in) (30-round mag)
- Cartridge: 5.56×45mm NATO
- Action: Gas-operated short-stroke system, rotating bolt Delayed blowback (prototype)
- Rate of fire: 750–760 rounds/min (VHS); 850 (±100) rounds/min (VHS-2)
- Muzzle velocity: VHS-D: 950 m/s (3,117 ft/s); VHS-K: 940 m/s (3,084 ft/s)
- Feed system: 30-round detachable HK G36 magazine or STANAG magazine
- Sights: Iron sights, laser sights and optical sights

The HS Produkt VHS (Croatian: Višenamjenska Hrvatska Strojnica, lit. multifunctional Croatian machine gun) is a 5.56×45mm NATO bullpup assault rifle designed and manufactured by HS Produkt of Croatia. The VHS rifle was first introduced at the 2007 iKA exhibition, the annual Croatian innovation display that takes place in the city of Karlovac. The development began from a Croatian Army request for a new infantry rifle to meet NATO standards.

An improved version of the VHS rifle, known as the VHS-2, was introduced in April 2013. In January 2022, it was announced that Springfield Armory, Inc. would be importing the VHS-2 into the US as the Hellion.

== History ==
=== Development ===
During the Croatian War of Independence, HS Produkt (then called IM Metal) created a bullpup variant of the 7.62 mm Kalashnikov assault rifle. This rifle had a number of flaws, partly caused by limited technological capabilities of IM Metal, but provided a valuable learning experience for the company. A delayed blowback model was tested in the mid-1990s, but the results were still not satisfactory, and it was superseded by a design similar to the M16 rifle. More prototypes followed in 1996, 1999 and 2004.

The development cycle that ultimately led to the current version of the VHS rifle started circa 2003. A new prototype, externally quite similar to the French FAMAS, was publicly announced in 2005 and presented to Croatian Minister of Defense Berislav Rončević. However, only 10% of the 2004 prototype was retained in the production model.

=== Evaluation and adoption ===
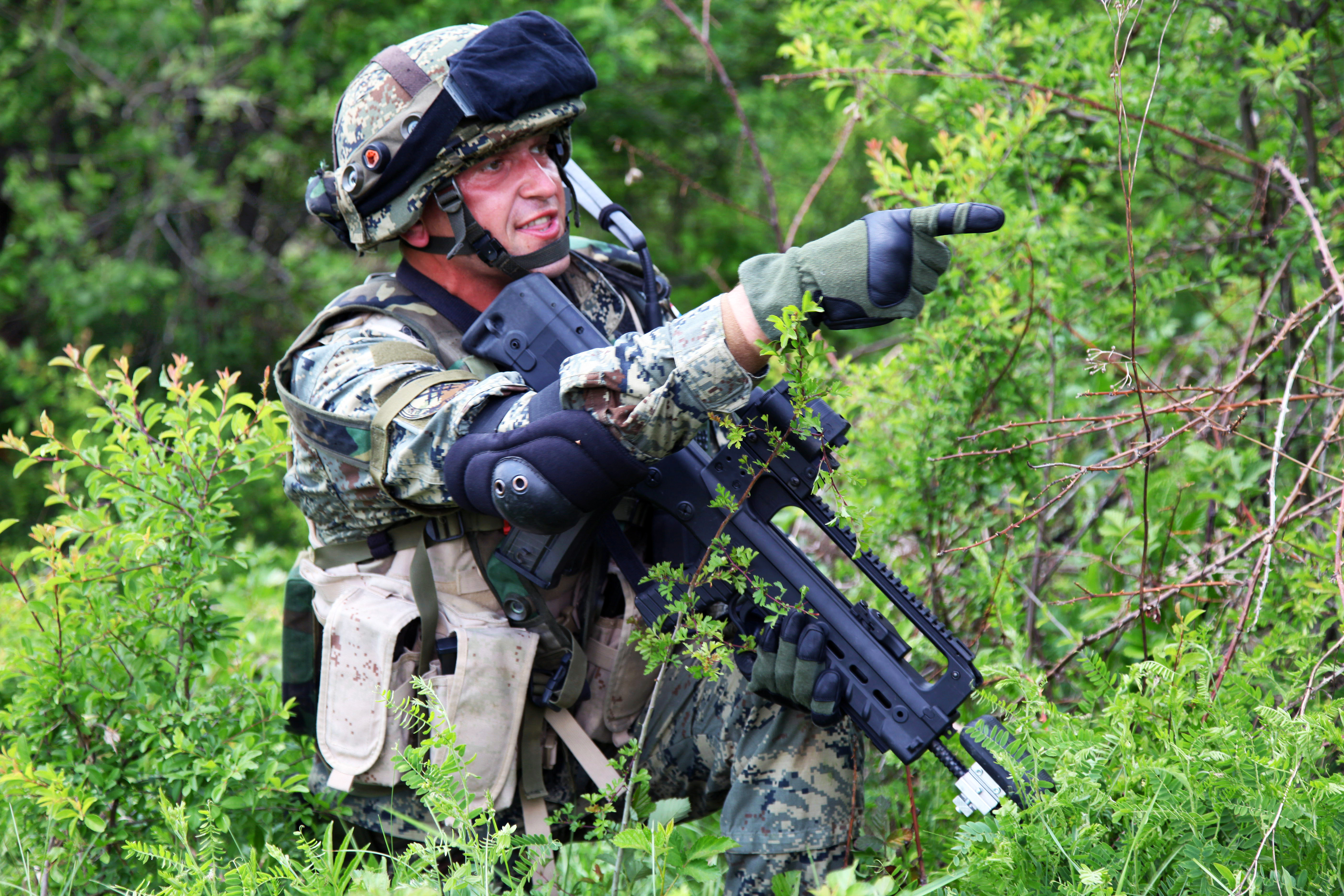
Croatian soldier armed with a VHS-D during a training exercise

On November 19, 2007, the Croatian Ministry of Defence placed an order for an experimental batch of 50 rifles to be tested by the Croatian contingent then deployed in Afghanistan within the International Security Assistance Force (ISAF). The contract was placed at 4.5 million kuna. Other nations, including Kuwait and Venezuela showed interest in acquiring the rifle.

On November 24, 2008, HS Produkt introduced the final version of the VHS assault rifle. After an initial testing phase with the first 40 rifles, an order for 1,000 rifles was made. In 2009, an additional order of 2,000 rifles was made to enter service with the Croatian Army. By the end of 2012, and as of 2013, the Croatian army had 3,600 VHS rifles in service. Another order of 2,000 rifles was to be delivered to the Croatian military by the end of 2014. A long-term Croatian Army requirement calls for 50,000 assault rifles, ensuring the long-term production of VHS-2. The US Department of Defense also made an order for 500 VHS rifles.

On May 12, 2009, Croatian Minister of Defence Branko Vukelić confirmed the positive conclusions of a series of torture tests and on May 15 officially signed a contract with HS Produkt for the acquisition of 1,000 rifles (both variants). As of 2015, the Croatian Army is using 7,000 VHS rifles.

== Design details ==
The VHS-D rifle is 765 mm (30.1 in) long, with a 500 mm (20 in) barrel. The whole rifle body is a monoblock construction made from high-impact polymer. Externally, it strongly resembles the French FAMAS rifle, but its operating mechanism and disassembly procedure are quite different. The VHS-K is a carbine variant with an overall length of 665 mm (26.2 in) and a 410 mm (16 in) barrel.

Some characteristics of the rifle were not revealed to the public and provoked rumours during the development period. One involved a hypothesized venting system which recovered part of the gases generated from firing the weapon to cushion the bolt and dramatically buffer recoil. The production-stage VHS operated in a much more conventional manner, not utilizing this buffering system. According to the schematic filed at the European Patent Office (EPO) the misconception may have come from combining two different features: a forced air ventilation system similar to the one in Pecheneg machine gun and a mechanical buffer reducer, similar in conception to the one used in Ultimax 100, a weapon Croatia used in the Croatian War of Independence and retains in its reserve inventory. The same patent states that the VHS works neither through direct gas impingement nor through a short- or long-stroke piston, but through a 'tappet' type of closed gas system much like the FN SCAR. There may have also been confusion with another prototype which did not go into production.

Confusion on the VHS's operating system was from several changes to the type of system used through its development. The first models used a Kalashnikov-style long-stroke piston, which was changed in 1999 to a lever delayed blowback system from the FAMAS. The next year, it was changed to a direct gas impingement system with a forced ventilation feature that formed a pneumatic cushion behind the bolt. The VHS was patented in that form in 2000 giving the impression of a "gas cushion" feature. That model was publicly known up to 2005. In 2004, the final and current operating system of the VHS was changed to a gas-operated, short-stroke piston system.

When the VHS went through service life testing it fired 50,000 rounds without suffering any main part failures. The barrel has a birdcage flash suppressor and can fire rifle grenades. Like the FAMAS, it has a sliding grenade boom guide and grenade high-angle launching sight to aim when the rifle is turned on its side, but the sight is mounted on the underside of the carrying handle on the VHS instead of under it. The rifle and carbine have different gas regulators, both with three settings changed by pushing in and turning 120 degrees: normal; high (larger opening for weak ammunition); and cut-off (for rifle grenades).

One drawback of the VHS is its poor ergonomics. The fire selector has three positions for safe, semi, and automatic fire with no 3-round burst option. Production model rifles have the selector inside the trigger guard. Changing firing modes is difficult as the crank must be rotated a long distance before either firing mode is selected. It is also for right-handed use only; the receiver can only eject shells out the right side and cases leave sharply toward the rear, with a chance of hitting an extended elbow. This is unfortunate, as the non-reciprocating cocking handle is located centrally under the carrying handle and can be pulled from either side.

Models presented in 2008 showed the VHS being STANAG magazine compatible. This was changed shortly after to accept HK G36 magazines. The reason was because the Croatian military has more G36s (which the VHS will replace) than M16-type rifles.

== Variants ==
=== VHS-D ===
The VHS-D is the first generation rifle variant produced by HS Produkt, outfitted with rifle grenade discharging adapters and bayonet lugs.

=== VHS-K ===
A carbine variant of the VHS-D.

=== VHS-2 ===
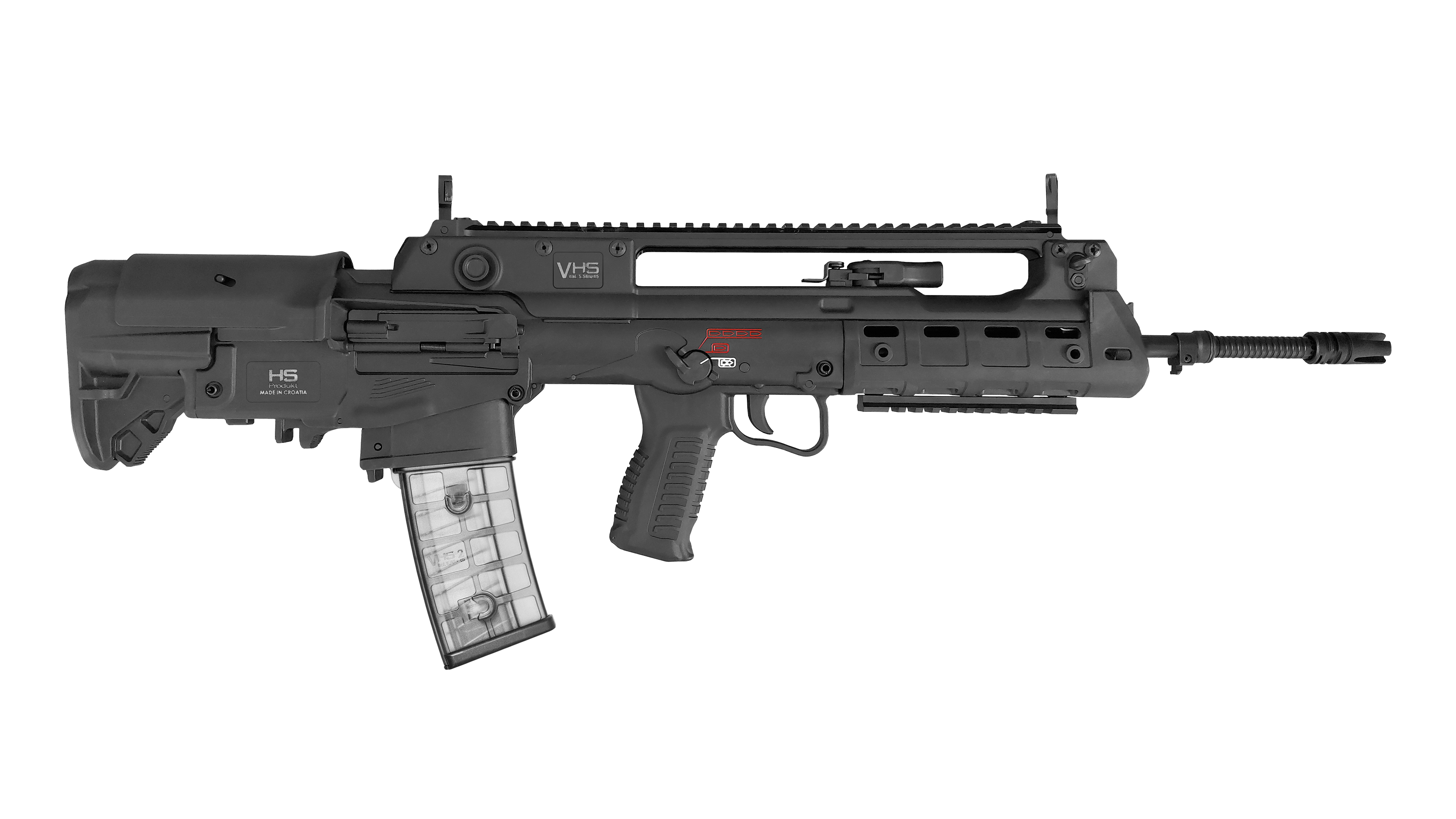
VHS-D2 with a 30-round HK G36 magazine

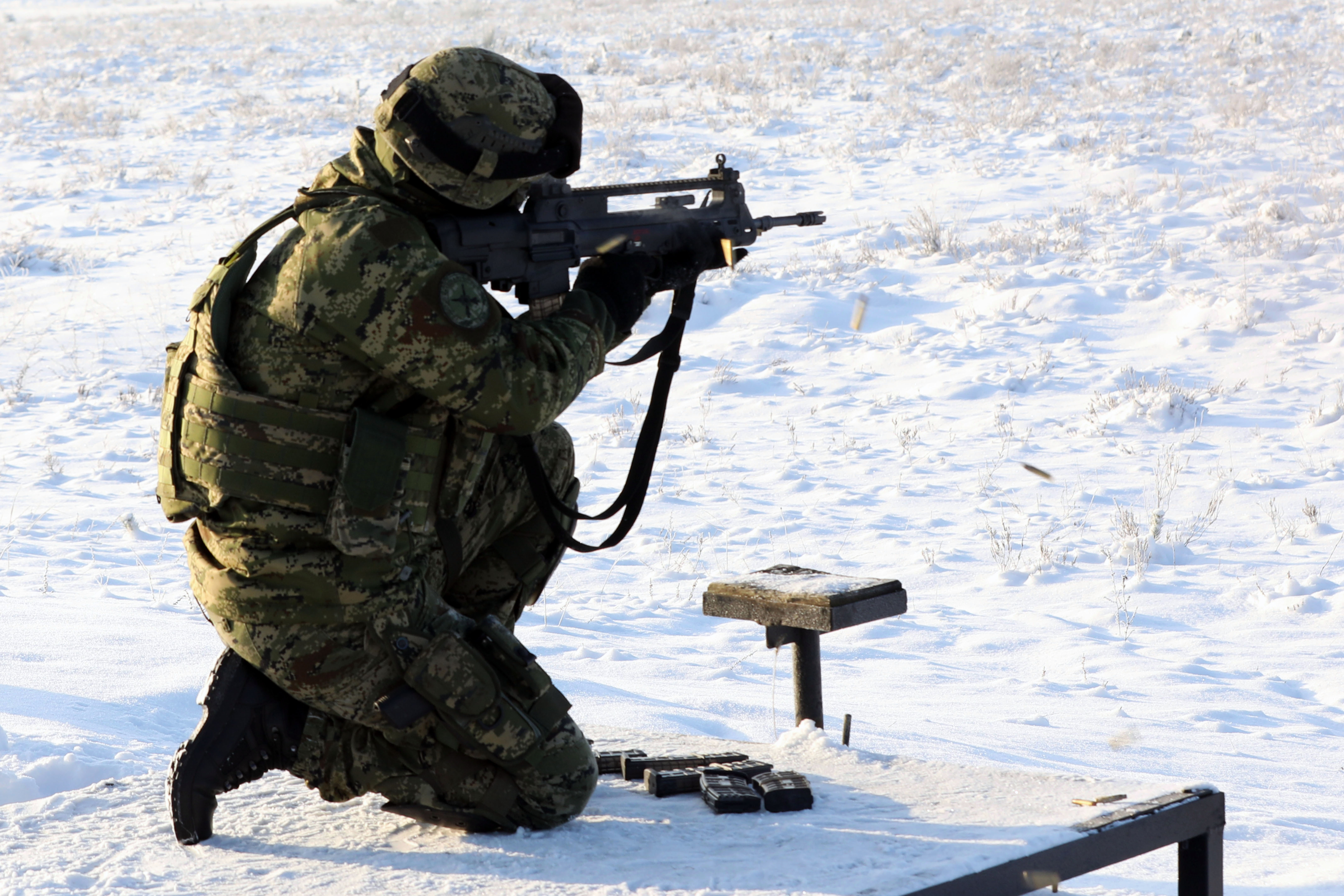
A Croatian soldier firing a VHS-D2

The VHS-2 was shown to the public for the first time in April 2013, during the Adriatic Sea Defense & Aerospace (ASDA) exhibition in Split, Croatia. Its improvements include a more conventional fire selector, a redesigned carrying handle, an adjustable-length buttstock, and an ambidextrous cartridge casing ejection system that can be reconfigured in less than a minute.

The VHS-2 line consists of the VHS-D2 assault rifle and the VHS-K2 carbine.

==== Foreign military interest ====
The VHS-F2 variant was specifically produced for French military trials, with a magazine well accommodating the FAMAS magazine. It was shortlisted for a purchase order of 100,000 assault rifles but the bid was ultimately won by the HK416.

The Romanian military held negotiations about local production and technology transfer for the VHS-2.

=== Springfield Hellion ===
A semi-automatic version of the VHS-2 was made for Springfield Armory, Inc., which was unveiled in January 2022.

== Users ==
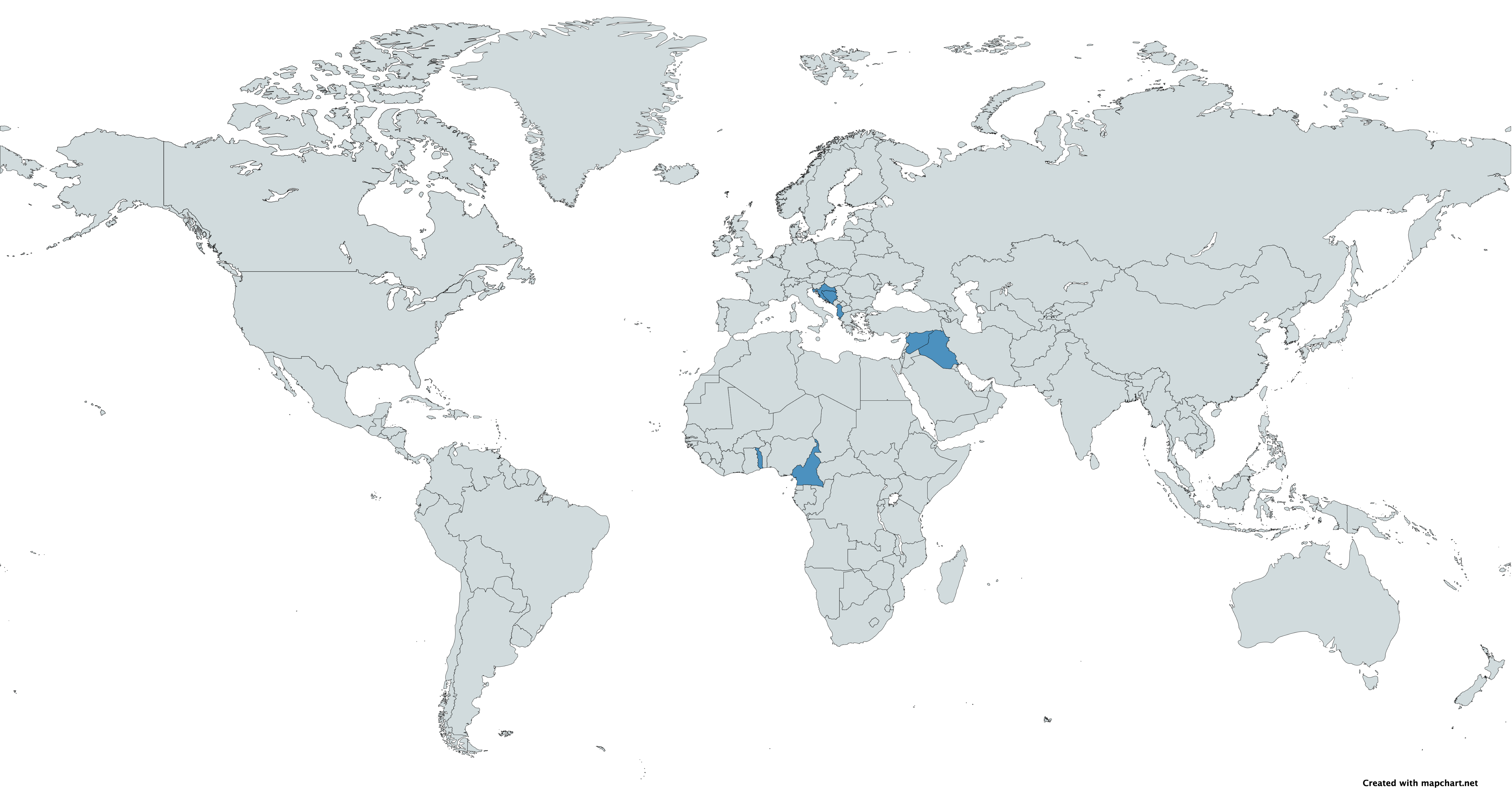
A map with HS Produkt VHS users in blue

- Albania: Used by the Albanian State Police.
- Bosnia-Herzegovina: Bosnian federal special police are armed with VHS-K2 rifles.
- Cameroon: VHS-2 used by the Cameroonian military.
- Croatia: VHS-2 is the standard-issue rifle of the Croatian Army, previously had also adopted the first generation VHS rifle. Also used by the police.
- Iraq: Up to 30,000 in service with the Iraqi Federal Police and Iraqi Ground and Special Forces, including the Emergency Response Division.
- Syria: In service with the Syrian Army. Supplied by Iraq.
- Togo: Togolese Army acquired 3,000 VHS-2 for peacekeeping missions. VHS-2 seen with the rest of Togolese Army.
- United States: Purchased 500 VHS-1 for testing and training in 2012, and 250 VHS-2 for testing and training in 2015.
