= HS2000 =

Polymer frame semi-automatic handgun

HS 2000 / Springfield Armory XD
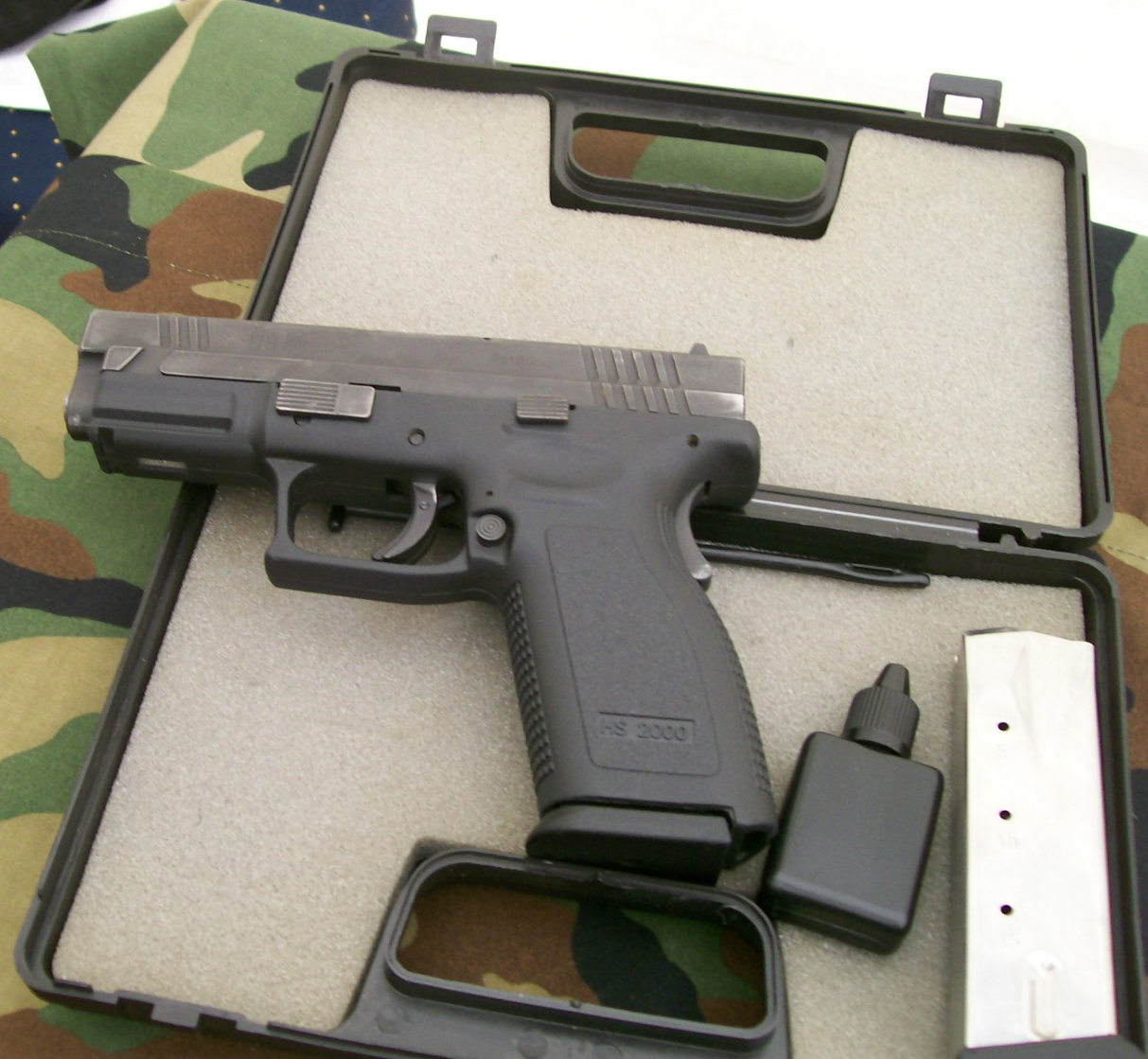
- An HS2000 service pistol
- Type: Semi-automatic pistol
- Place of origin: Croatia

Service history
- In service: 1999–present
- Used by: See Users
- Wars: Iraq War; Syrian Civil War

Production history
- Designer: Marko Vuković
- Designed: c. 1999
- Manufacturer: HS Produkt
- Produced: 1999–present
- Variants: See Variants

Specifications
- Cartridge: 9×19mm Parabellum; .357 SIG; .40 S&W; 10mm Auto; .45 ACP
- Action: Short recoil operated
- Feed system: Detachable box magazine
- Sights: Fixed and illuminated night sights

The HS2000 (Hrvatski Samokres, English: Croatian pistol) is a series of semi-automatic pistols. Polymer-framed and striker-fired, the series is manufactured by HS Produkt (formerly I.M. Metal) in Karlovac, Croatia. In Europe, the pistols are marketed as the HS and XDM series, while in the United States, the pistols are sold as the Springfield Armory XD and XD-M series, respectively. Other derivative variants sold by Springfield Armory, Inc., are unique to the American market.

== History ==
The HS2000 traces its roots back to a service pistol known as the PHP (Prvi Hrvatski Pistolj, English: first Croatian pistol), which was first produced in Croatia by privately owned industrial parts firm I. M. Metal in 1991. Designed by a team led by Marko Vuković, the PHP was considered to be a solid design, but early versions were plagued by quality issues, due in large part to the difficulties of manufacturing during the Yugoslav war. Vuković's team continued to tweak and improve the design over the next decade, releasing the HS95 (Hrvatski Samokres or Croatian Pistol) in 1995, and the HS2000 in 1999. At the beginning of 2001, following the success of the HS2000 pistols on the world market, the company changed its name to HS Produkt.

The HS2000 was adopted by the Croatian military and law enforcement as a standard issue sidearm. It was initially exported to the United States market by Intrac and distributed by HSAmerica, who sold the pistol in 9×19mm Parabellum (9mm) as the HS2000. In 2002, Springfield Armory, Inc., negotiated licensing rights to the United States market, using XD (eXtreme Duty) branding. In 2013, HS Produkt began (via a wholesale distributor) to offer updated variants, branded as XDM, (Note: HS Produkt styles the name of these pistols as XDM in Europe, while Springfield Armory Inc. styles them as XD-M in the United States. Variants such as XD^{M} and XD(M) with inconsistent capitalization are common.) in Europe. As of March 2020, HS Produkt lists both HS series and XDM series pistols on its website, corresponding to the XD and XD-M series, respectively, sold in the United States by Springfield Armory. Additional variants with a single-stack magazine (XD-S), an external hammer (XD-E), or generational updates (Mod.2) are unique to the American market.

== Design ==
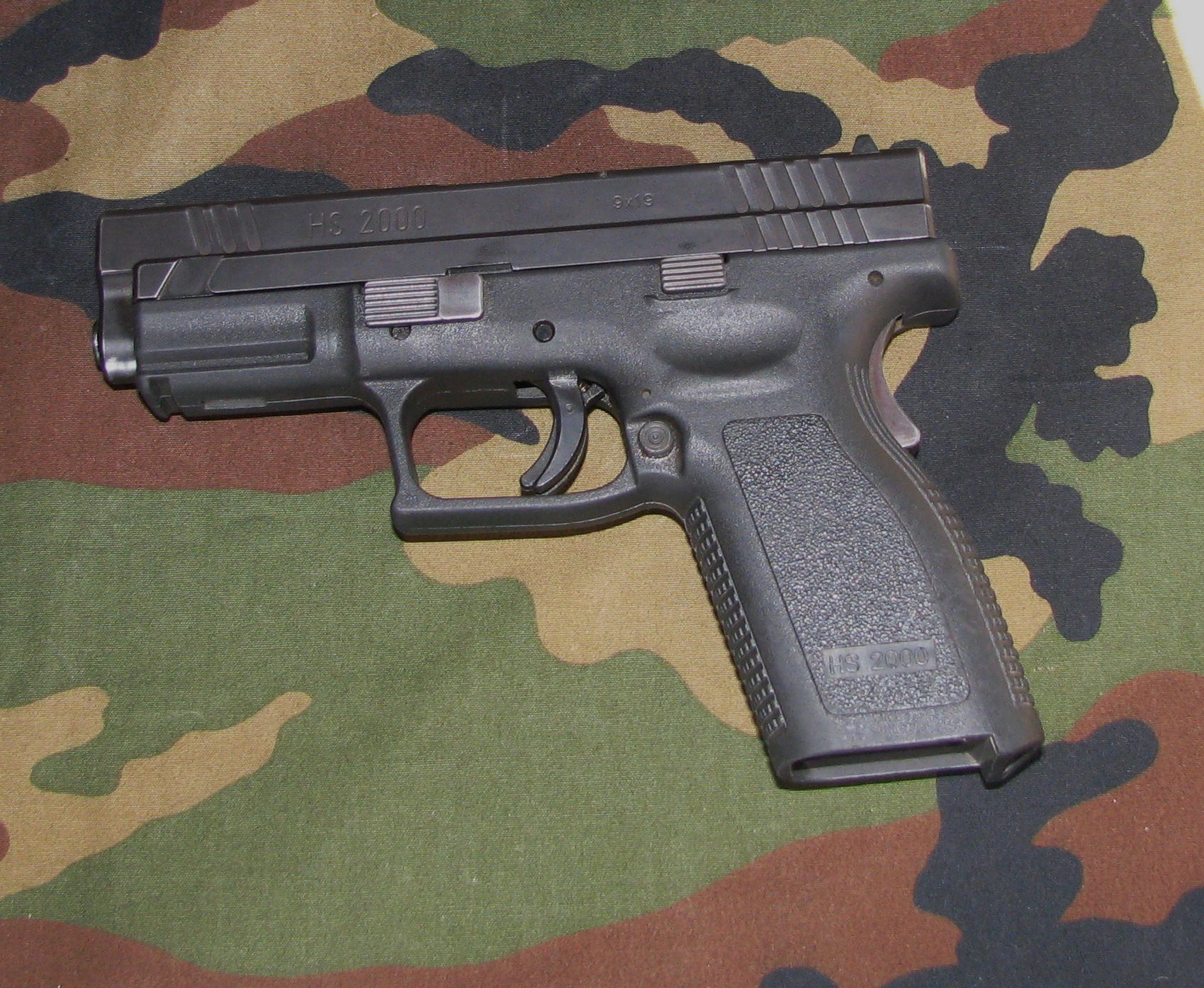
An HS2000 with magazine removed

The HS2000 is a short recoil-operated, locked breech, striker fired semi-automatic pistol. Pistols in the series utilize a polymer frame with steel inserts, mounting rail and trigger-mounted safety. A cocked striker indicator protrudes from the rear of the slide when the striker is cocked. A loaded chamber indicator pivots up on top of the slide when a round is in the chamber being both visual and tactile. An ambidextrous magazine release is also standard. Take down of the pistol is through a lever on the left side of the frame that rotates up, allowing the slide to move forward off the frame. This is very similar to the mechanism of take down as seen in pistols manufactured by SIG Sauer. A trigger pull is necessary during field stripping of the HS2000.

The factory-standard trigger has a travel of 13 mm (0.5 in) and is rated at 25 N (5.6 lb_{f}) to 30 N (6.7 lb_{f}). Most HS2000s have dual captive recoil springs; however, the XDM and Tactical 5-inch (130 mm) models have non-captive springs. The recoil spring guide rod also acts as a standoff device, as the end of the rod protrudes from under the barrel and keeps the slide in battery when pressed against an object such as someones's chest in contact-distance self-defense situations. This prevents the slide from being moved back because the device pushes the surface area of objects away from the slide, thus increasing the chance that the gun will function normally.

After heat treatment the metal parts are finished with a proprietary nitriding process called Tenifer Plus+. This finish is characterized by extreme wear and corrosion resistance; it penetrates the metal, and treated parts have similar properties even below the surface to a certain depth. The Tenifer Plus+ process produces a matte gray-colored, non-glare surface with a 64 Rockwell C hardness rating and a 1,200–1,300 N/mm^{2} tensile strength. This finish makes the HS2000 particularly suitable for concealed carry, as the highly chloride-resistant finish allows the pistol to better endure the effects of perspiration.

The HS2000 has a grip safety that will not allow the pistol to fire without depressing a lever on the rear of the grip. This feature is present on some older pistols such as the M1911. Unlike the 1911, the grip safety on HS2000 series also locks the slide. The means without a proper grip on the gun to depress the grip safety, the slide cannot be cycled to load or clear the gun. In addition to a trigger safety, a drop safety prevents the striker from releasing if the gun is dropped or exposed to a significant impact. As of 2008, 4-inch (100 mm) and 5-inch (130 mm) XD Service models chambered in .45 ACP were available with an optional ambidextrous frame-mounted thumb safety.

The HS2000 is fed by staggered-column (otherwise known as "double-stack") detachable box magazines that are made of polished stainless steel with a polymer basepad. The empty weight of a standard-sized HS2000 box magazine is 80 g (2.8 oz).

=== XDM ===
XDM pistols are polymer-framed with full steel inserts and a mounting rail, with a match grade barrel and trigger, and an ambidextrous magazine release. These barrels are manufactured to tighter tolerances and custom-fitted for better accuracy and to make the pistol "competition ready".

Featuring an "all terrain" grip pattern, contours in the grip were designed to maximize control. Serrations on the slide were modified for a better grasp. All XDM pistols come with grip and trigger safety mechanisms and a loaded chamber indicator at the top of the gun just behind the barrel. A traditional manual safety is an optional feature. The surface of the metal has undergone a Melonite treatment, a salt bath nitriding process which leaves a hard, corrosion-resistant surface. Disassembling the gun does not require pulling the trigger.

The XDM chambered in .45 ACP is offered in three different models with 3.8 in (97 mm), 4.5 in (110 mm), and 5.25 in (133 mm) inch barrels. Each of these models has a 13+1 capacity (13 rounds in the magazine, plus one round in the chamber), while the highest capacity for 9mm models is 19+1. The 3.8-inch model is also available with a compact magazine that holds nine rounds, which reduces grip length by 1 inch (25 mm) for a more comfortable concealed carry option.

== Variants ==
As of March 2020, the following models and chamberings are listed on the HS Produkt website:

Type	HS series
Standard	9mm / .357 SIG / .40 S&W / .45 ACP†
Sub-compact	9mm / .40 S&W / .45 ACP
Tactical	9mm / .357 SIG / .40 S&W / .45 ACP†
Tactical Compact	.45 ACP

† Manual safety optional

Type	XDM series
3.8 in (97 mm)	9mm / .40 S&W
Compact 3.8 in (97 mm)	9mm / .40 S&W / .45 ACP
4.5 in (110 mm)	9mm / .40 S&W / .45 ACP
5.25 in (133 mm)	9mm / .40 S&W / .45 ACP

Noted length is for the barrel.

== Users ==
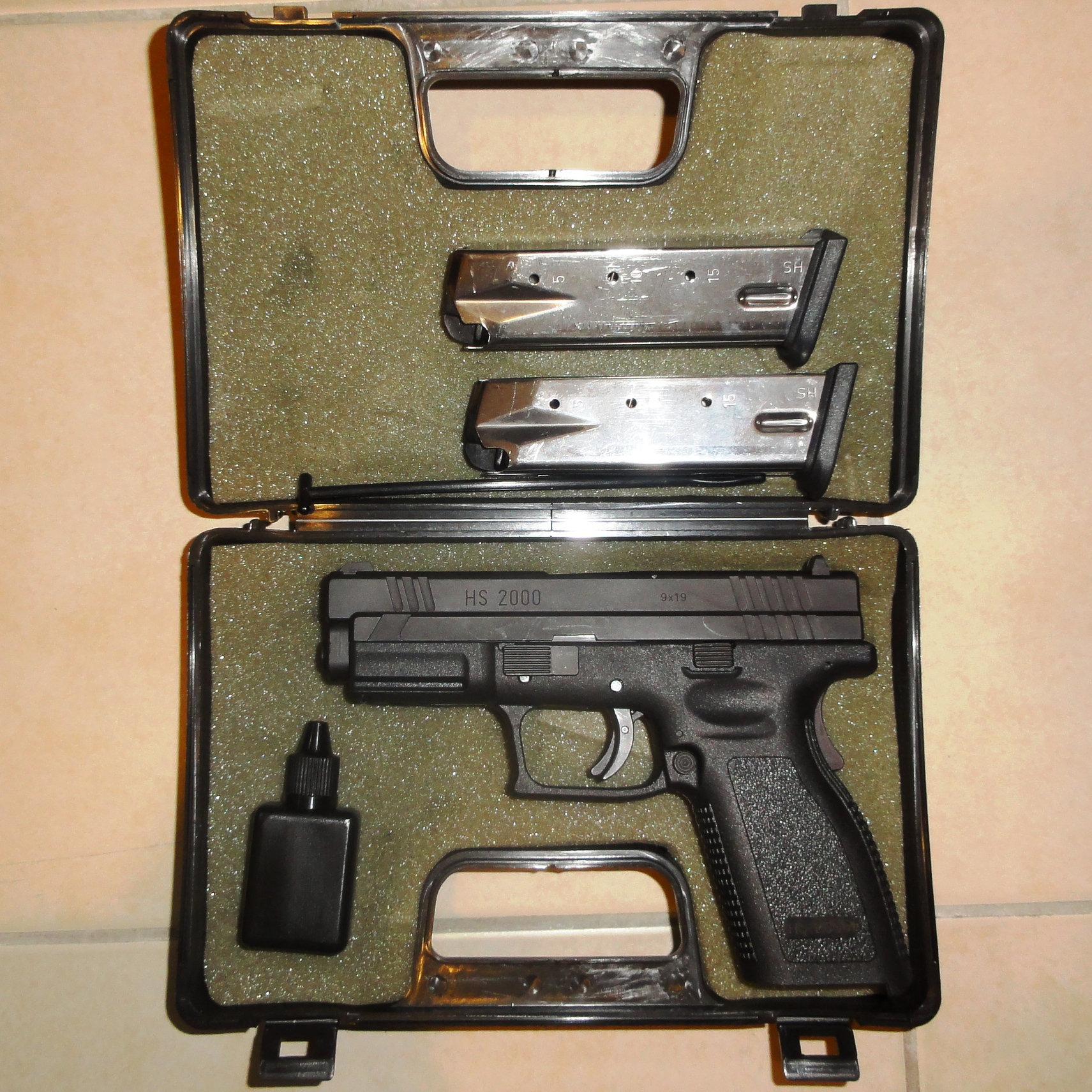
An HS2000 with original case and oil bottle

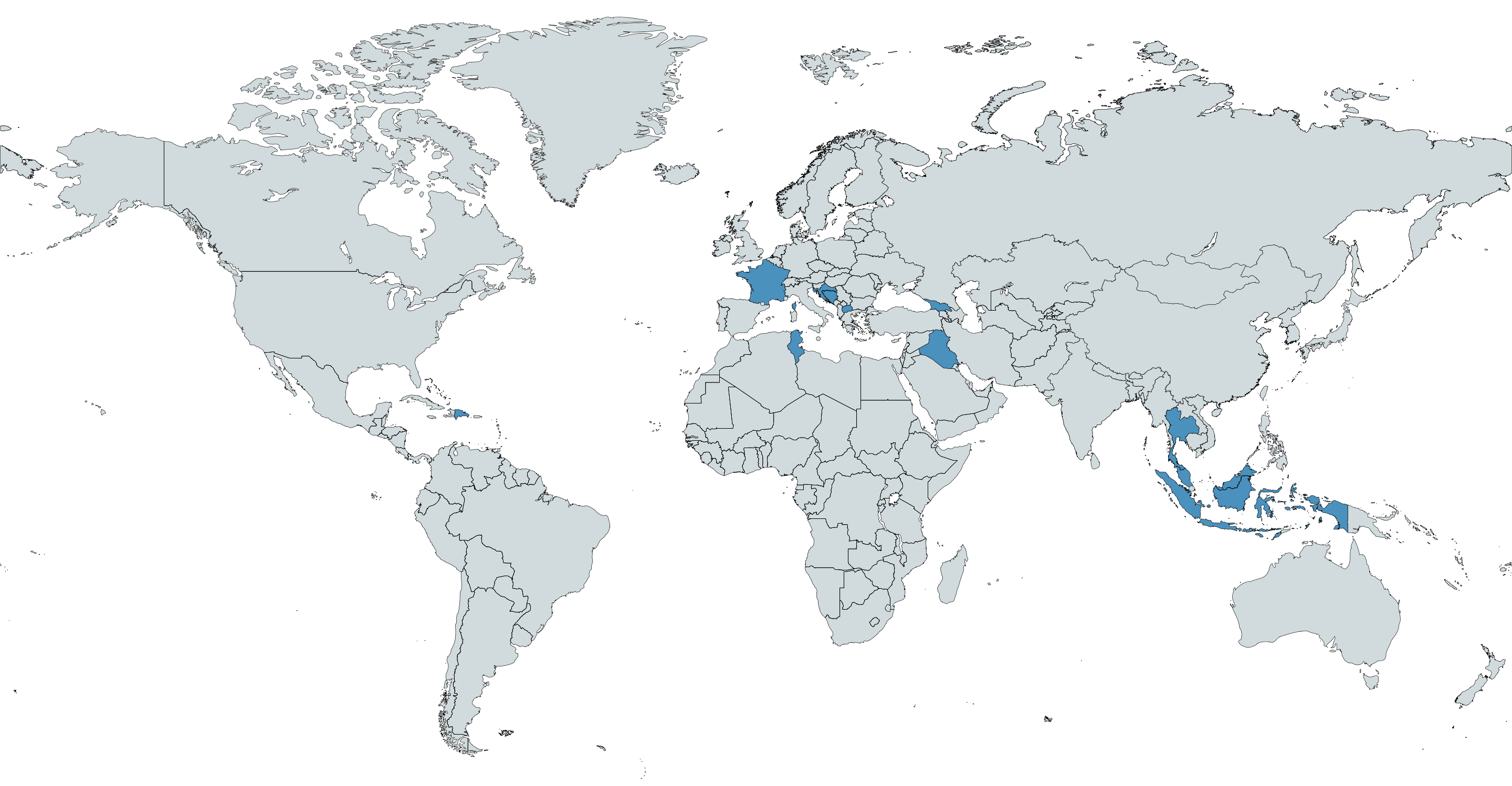
Map with HS2000 users in blue

- Bosnia and Herzegovina: Used by the armed forces.
- Croatia: Standard sidearm of the Croatian Armed Forces and Croatian Police since 1999.
- Dominican Republic: Used by the armed forces.
- France: Used by the RATP.
- Georgia: Standard Issue pistol of Georgian Police, also used by some Army Units.
- Indonesia: Used by the police and armed forces.
- Iraq: Used by the Iraqi police.
- Malaysia: Used by the armed forces.
- North Macedonia: Used by the armed forces.
- Thailand: Used by the armed forces.
- Tunisia: 1,000 used by the armed forces and police.

=== Failed bids ===
- France: The French Armed Forces in 2020 preferred the 5th-generation Glock 17 over the HS2000 and CZ P-10 offerings that also made it to the final selection phase to replace their MAC Mle 1950 and, to a lesser extent, their PAMAS G1 pistols.
