= .45 GAP =

Pistol cartridge designed by Ernest Durham

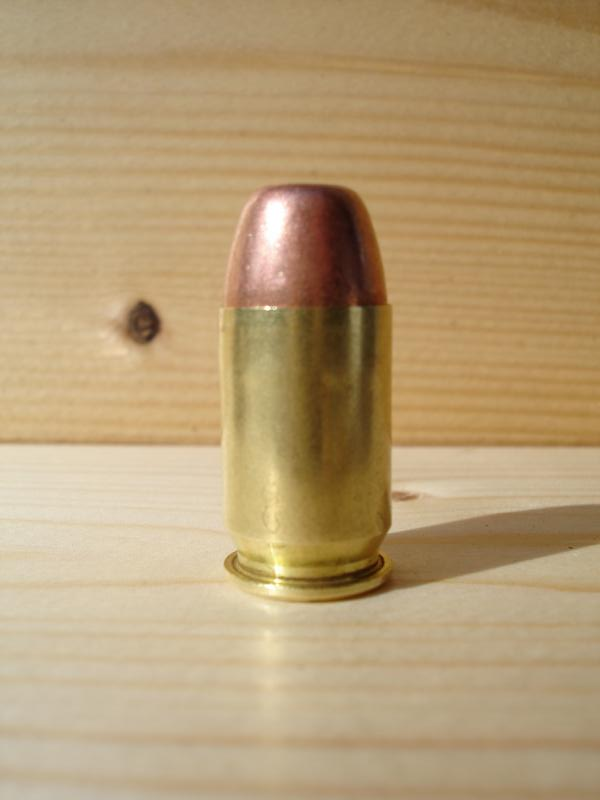
- A .45 GAP cartridge.
- Type: Pistol
- Place of origin: Austria; United States

Service history
- In service: 2003–present

Production history
- Designer: Ernest Durham
- Designed: November 2002
- Manufacturer: CCI/Speer
- Produced: 2003–present

Specifications
- Case type: Rebated, straight walled
- Bullet diameter: 11.48 mm (0.452 in)
- Case length: 19.18 mm (0.755 in)
- Overall length: 27.18 mm (1.070 in)
- Primer type: Small pistol
- Maximum pressure (CIP): 138 MPa (20,000 psi)
- Maximum pressure (SAAMI): 160 MPa (23,000 psi)

Ballistic performance
Bullet mass/type	Velocity	Energy
185 gr (12 g) Gold Dot JHP	350 m/s (1,100 ft/s)	734 J (541 ft⋅lbf)
200 gr (13 g) Gold Dot JHP	320 m/s (1,000 ft/s)	664 J (490 ft⋅lbf)
230 gr (15 g) Gold Dot JHP	285 m/s (940 ft/s)	605 J (446 ft⋅lbf)
230 gr (15 g) FMJ-FP	286 m/s (940 ft/s)	610 J (450 ft⋅lbf)
- Test barrel length: 4.49 in Source: DoubleTap Ammo

The .45 GAP (Glock Auto Pistol) or .45 Glock (11.43×19mmRB) is a pistol cartridge designed by Ernest Durham, an engineer with CCI/Speer, at the request of firearms manufacturer Glock to provide a cartridge that would equal the power of the .45 ACP, have a stronger case head to reduce the possibility of case neck blowouts, and be shorter to fit in a more compact handgun. The .45 GAP is the first commercially introduced cartridge that has been identified with Glock.

== Development ==
The .45 GAP has the same diameter as the .45 ACP pistol cartridge but is slightly shorter, and uses a small-pistol primer instead of the large-pistol primer most commonly used in .45 ACP ammunition. Originally, the maximum bullet weight of the .45 GAP was 200 grains (13 g). In order to provide terminal ballistics that matched the standard 230-grain (15 g) .45 ACP loads, the .45 GAP was designed to operate at a higher standard pressure—roughly equivalent to the higher pressures found in .45 ACP "+P" rounds. Since the .45 GAP has a much smaller cartridge volume than the .45 ACP, the desired pressure and resulting velocity needed to be achieved through powder selection alone. Later development concluded that the .45 GAP can also fire 230-grain (15 g) projectiles, as does the .45 ACP; though this pushes the .45 GAP cartridge to its limits.

=== Glock .45 GAP pistols ===
The full-size Glock 37 pistol was introduced by Glock to use the .45 GAP cartridge and was followed by the compact Glock 38 and the subcompact Glock 39. Glock's .45 GAP–sized pistols use the same frame as their 9×19mm/.40 S&W/.357 SIG line of pistols. The slide is slightly wider to accommodate the larger diameter .45 round and is flush with the frame. Magazines for the .45 GAP are of the same dimensions as those of the 9×19mm/.40 S&W/.357 SIG line of pistols.

=== Other .45 GAP firearms ===
Initially, due to its acceptance by law enforcement and the popularity of subcompact handguns for concealed carry, a small number of manufacturers decided to produce pistols that were chambered in .45 GAP, but they no longer produce any pistols in that caliber. Only Glock continues to manufacture pistols in the .45 GAP cartridge. Springfield Armory, Inc. did make the XD series in .45 GAP, and indeed it was the first commercially available pistol for it, but discontinued that chambering soon thereafter.

== Law enforcement applications ==
Modern law enforcement as a whole has moved away from .45 caliber weapons in favor of firearms chambered in .40 S&W and 9×19mm. Despite this change, the .45 GAP initially had a following amongst many law enforcement departments. Three state law enforcement agencies adopted the .45 GAP as a replacement for their issue 9×19mm Parabellum (New York) or .40 S&W service handguns (South Carolina and Florida). The New York State Police (New York Police have recently completed the transition to .45 ACP for their duty round), South Carolina Highway Patrol, and Florida Highway Patrol had all adopted the Glock 37 and .45 GAP. As of 2025, the New York State Police, South Carolina Highway Patrol, and Florida Highway Patrol no longer issue firearms chambered in .45 GAP.

The Pennsylvania State Police also carried the Glock 37 from 2007, but, due to ammunition supply problems, replaced them in 2013 with the fourth generation Glock 21 in .45 ACP. After recall issues with the new fourth generation Glocks, the Pennsylvania State Police switched to the SIG Sauer P227 in .45 ACP.

== See also ==
- .44 Magnum
- .45 Super
- 10mm Auto
- 11 mm caliber
- List of rebated rim cartridges
- List of handgun cartridges
- List of rifle cartridges
- Table of handgun and rifle cartridges
