= HS Produkt =

Croatian firearms manufacturer

HS Produkt d.o.o.
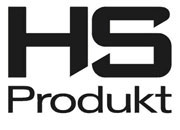
- Formerly: IM Metal
- Company type: LLC
- Industry: Firearms, Defense
- Founded: 1991; 35 years ago
- Founder: Ivan Žabčić and Marko Vuković
- Headquarters: Ozalj, Karlovac, Croatia
- Area served: Worldwide
- Key people: Željko Pavlin (CEO)
- Products: Pistols, submachine guns, assault rifles, grenade launchers
- Revenue: €149.15 million (2024)
- Number of employees: c. 2000 (2013)
- Website: www.hs-produkt.hr

HS Produkt d.o.o. (Croatian: Hrvatski Samokres, lit. 'Croatian Pistol') is a Croatian firearms manufacturing company, best known for design and production of the HS2000 and XDM series of semi-automatic pistols, which are sold in the United States market by Springfield Armory, Inc., under their XD, XD-S, XD-M, Echelon and Hellcat brandings. (Note: HS Produkt uses a styling of XDM in Europe, while Springfield Armory Inc. uses a styling of XD-M in the United States. Variants such as XD^{M} and XD(M) with inconsistent capitalization are common.)

== History ==
HS Produkt was founded as IM Metal in 1991, after the first democratic election in the Republic of Croatia. Since company founding its headquarters was situated in the town of Ozalj, Croatia, about 50 kilometers southwest of the capital Zagreb, and its manufacturing facility was relocated to Karlovac in 2000.

At the beginning of 2001, following the success of the HS2000 pistols on the world market, the company changed its name to HS Produkt.

HS Produkt's current production facility produces about 30,000 pistols per month with a trend of continued growth; ninety percent of production is exported to the United States. The number of employees rose from around 80 in 2000 to nearly 1000 in 2007, making HS Produkt the leading employer in Karlovac County.

Founders and co-owners of HS Produkt, Ivan Žabčić and Marko Vuković, are both mechanical engineers; Vuković is the chief designer behind most of the company's products. Vuković also has combat experience as a veteran of the Croatian War of Independence, in which he was wounded twice.

HS Produkt is in 2016, one of the suppliers competing for the replacement of French army rifles alongside manufacturers such as Beretta (Italy), FN Herstal (Belgium), Swiss Arms (Switzerland) and Heckler & Koch (Germany).

== Products ==
=== Early products ===
- Krešimir, a semi-automatic grenade launcher manufactured in 1991 used a 5-round magazine of M50 hand grenades with percussion fuses. A second magazine held 7.62x39mm grenade-launching blank cartridges. It was named upon king Peter Krešimir IV of Croatia.
- ALKA M-93, a 9x19mm submachine gun manufactured from 1994 to 1995. The weapon had a lightweight bolt with a short travel, which allowed for a very high rate of fire (1200 RPM).
- PHP (Prvi Hrvatski Pištolj), a semi-automatic pistol, manufactured from 1991 to 1994 was the company's first pistol design. It was based on Walther P38, with some features common with Beretta 92.
- HS95 (Hrvatski Samokres 95) was the second handgun model, described as an unlicensed copy of the SIG Sauer P226 with some original external features. These early all-metal pistols were considered solid designs, but were plagued by quality issues due in large part to the difficulties of manufacturing during wartime.
- RHS revolver designed by Hrvoje Rapić was chambered in 9x19mm pistol ammunition, serial production was planned for 2013.

=== HS2000 pistol ===
The company's most successful product, the HS2000 (Hrvatski Samokres 2000) polymer-framed semi-automatic pistol, was HS Produkt's third pistol in a series developed on the basis of experience gained during the Croatian War of Independence. It was introduced in 1999. It is marketed in the US by Springfield Armory, Inc. as the XD (eXtreme Duty) series. The pistol is the standard sidearm of the Croatian Armed Forces and Police. It has attained a niche of its own on the world market; as of 2007, more than 500,000 pistols have been sold in the US, where it is popular both with law enforcement and the country's civilian market.

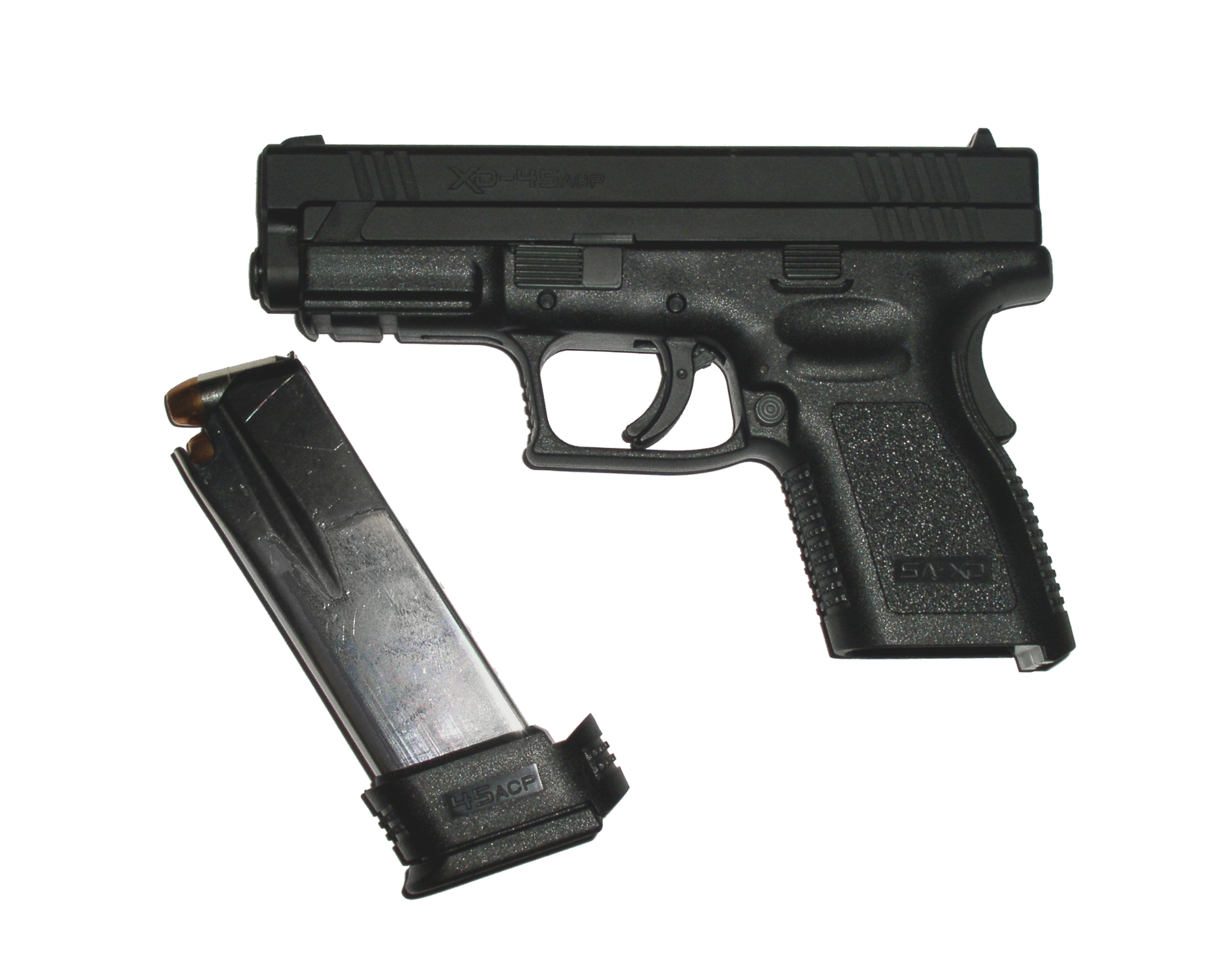

=== Hellcat pistol ===
This micro-compact polymer-framed semi-automatic pistol is produced by HS Produkt and marketed by Springfield Armory, Inc., as the Hellcat. Its original international name is HS Produkt H11. It was designed as a concealed carry weapon, similar to SIG Sauer P365. Hellcat 9mm was named Guns & Ammo handgun of the year and won a NASGW-POMA award for 2020 best new handgun.

=== Echelon pistol ===
In an effort to appeal to new military and police tenders as well as introduce a forward-looking new design, the company has brought out a pistol based on a serialized chassis like that of the SIG Sauer P320/SIG Sauer M17 series. The Echelon is a full-size gun that has a modular, self-contained fire-control chassis that is removable for cleaning and maintenance. Echelon was named Guns & Ammo handgun of the year and won the NASGW-POMA 2023 award for best new handgun.

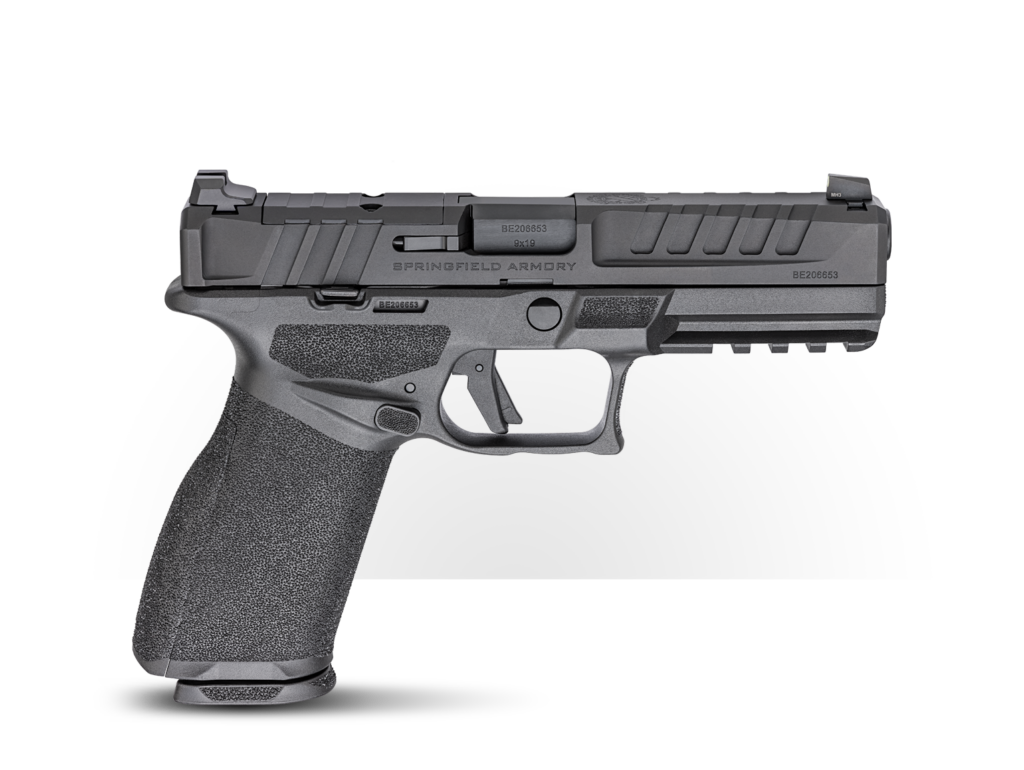

=== Kuna submachine gun ===
Kuna (Croatian for Marten) submachine gun appeared first at the COP Internacional trade show in Sao Paulo in 2024 after HS Produkt won a contract with the Sao Paulo Military Police. Later in 2025 it was revealed at EnforceTac 2025 and IWA OutdoorClassics 2025 under Springfield Armory branding. It's available in a semi-automatic version for commercial and civilian sales, and as a select-fire sub-machine gun for military, law enforcement and government sales in 9x19mm Parabellum and .40 S&W variants.

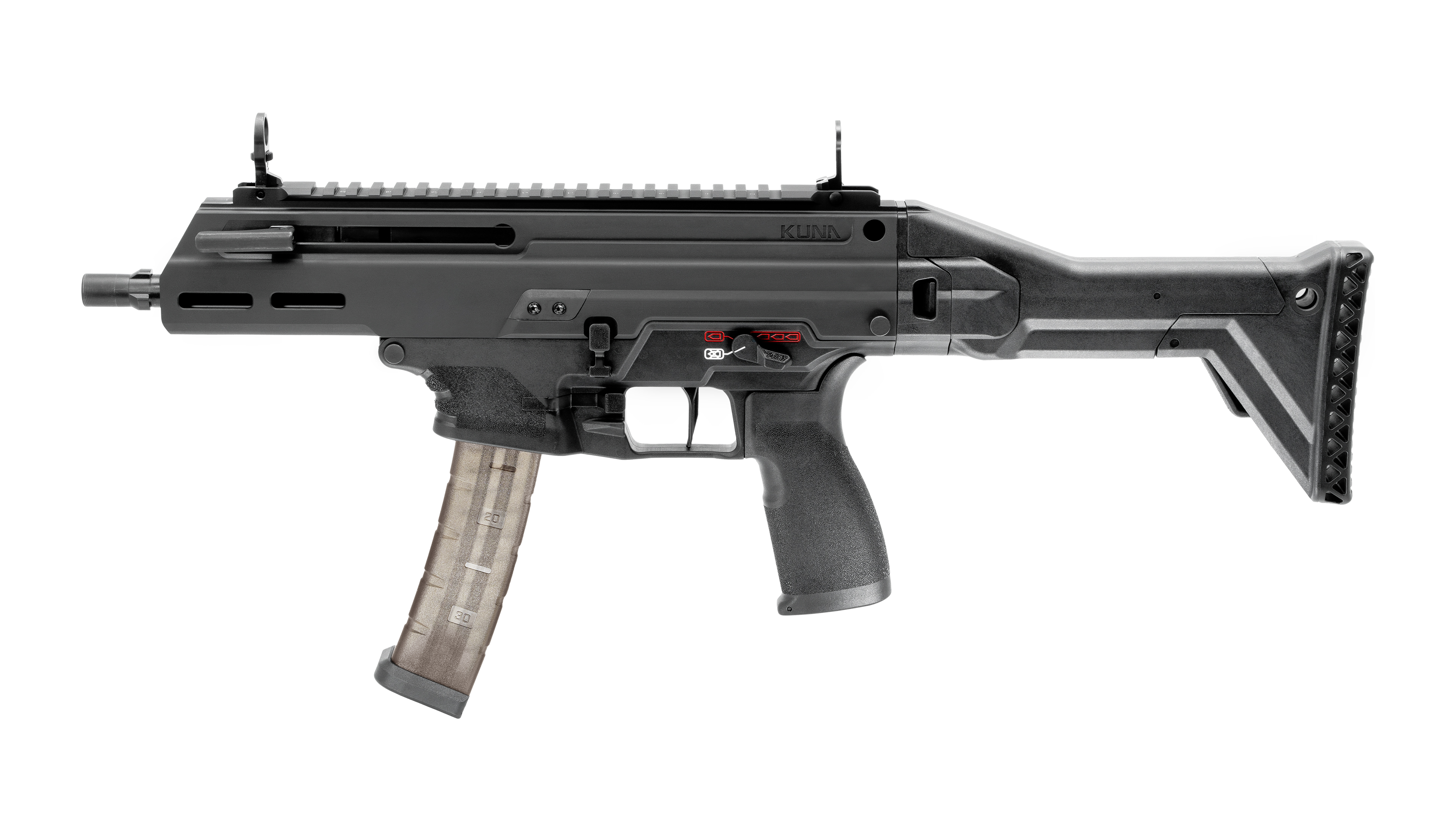

=== VHS assault rifle ===
The VHS assault rifle is a 5.56×45mm NATO bullpup select-fire weapon that was first introduced at the 2007 iKA, the annual Croatian innovation display that takes place in the city of Karlovac. The development was carried on following a request of the Croatian Army for a new infantry rifle to update the individual equipment to NATO standards.

On 19 November 2007, the Croatian Ministry of Defence placed an order for an experimental batch of 50 rifles to be tested by the Croatian contingent currently deployed in Afghanistan within the ISAF. Full-scale production began towards the end of 2008, when field testing completed. The initial model resembles the FAMAS. Other nations, including Kuwait and Venezuela, have shown interest in acquiring the rifle.

On 12 May 2009, the Croatian Minister of Defence Branko Vukelić confirmed the positive end of a torture test over the rifle and on 15 May officially signed a contract with HS Produkt for the acquisition of 20,000 rifle kits (both versions) for a medium price of 14,503 Croatian kunas each (as of December 8, 2018, approximately 2233.70 USD or 1961.52 EUR).

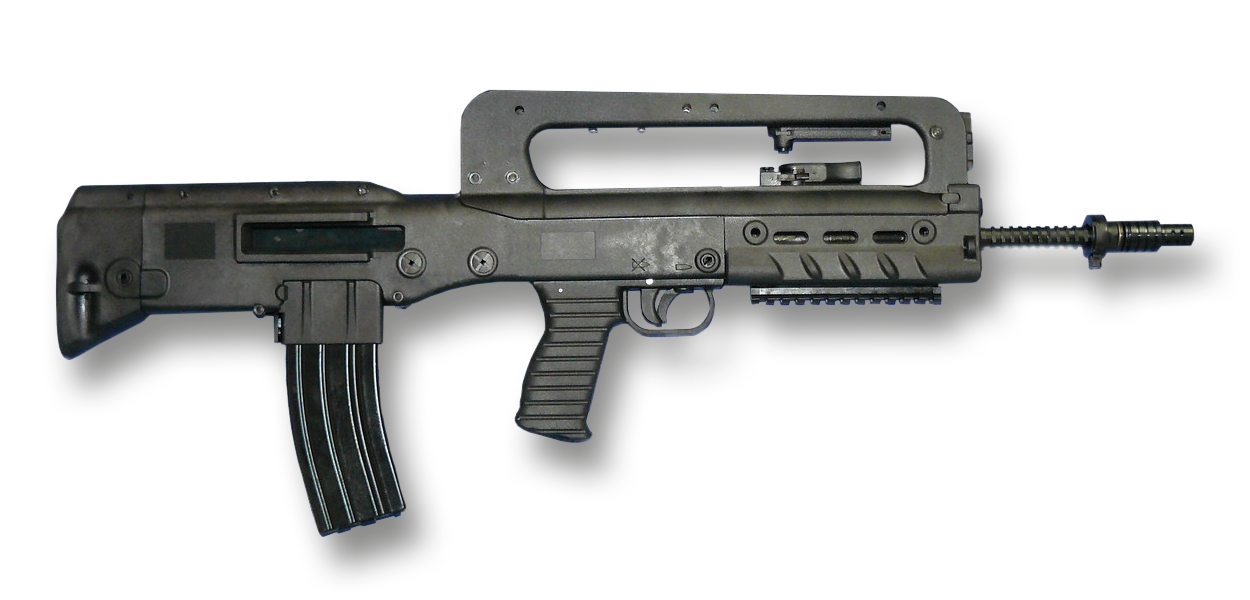

A new and improved version of the VHS rifle, known as the VHS-2, was introduced in April 2013. It introduced a new, more conventional fire selector, a redesigned carrying handle, an adjustable-length buttstock, and an ambidextrous cartridge casings ejection system that can be configured for either right or left side ejection in less than a minute. Both rifles come in two barrel lengths designated as D (long) and K (carbine) variants. Both rifles can be equipped with 40x46mm VHS-BG grenade launcher.

The civilian version of semi-automatic VHS2S (Springfield Hellion) in .223 Remington caliber was introduced in 2022. Hellion won American Rifleman award for 2023 tactical product of the year.

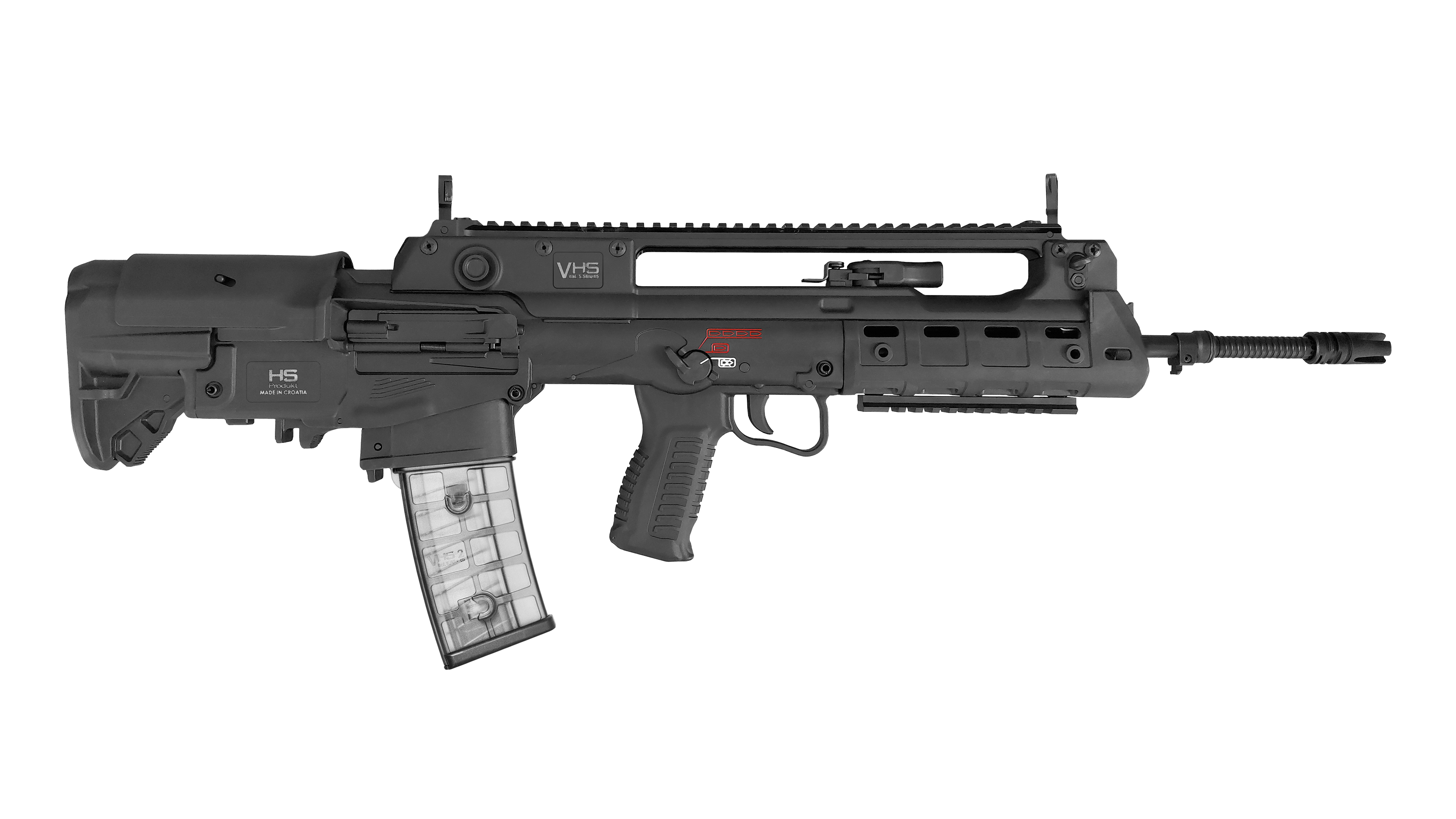

=== VHS-BG grenade launcher ===
The VHS-BG is double action single-shot 40x46mm grenade launcher. Equipped with hammer forged barrel and high durable polymer, VHS-BG can fire all 40x46mm type of grenades and can be used as stand alone variant or as under-barrel grenade launcher for VHS-2 rifle. It has mechanical sight attached to the side of the launcher, either on the left or right depending on the users needs.

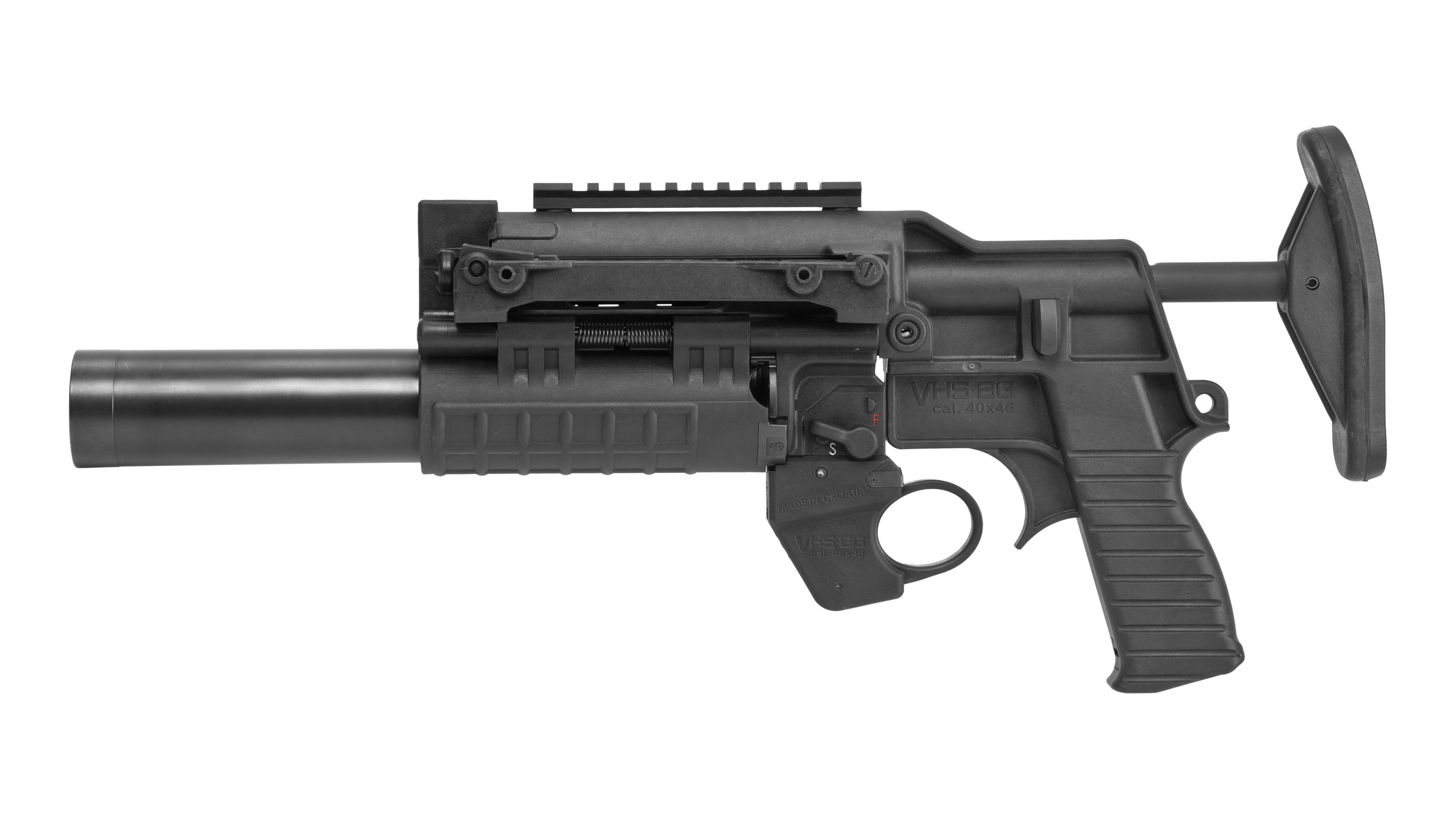
