= Springfield Armory XD =

Polymer frame semi-automatic handgun

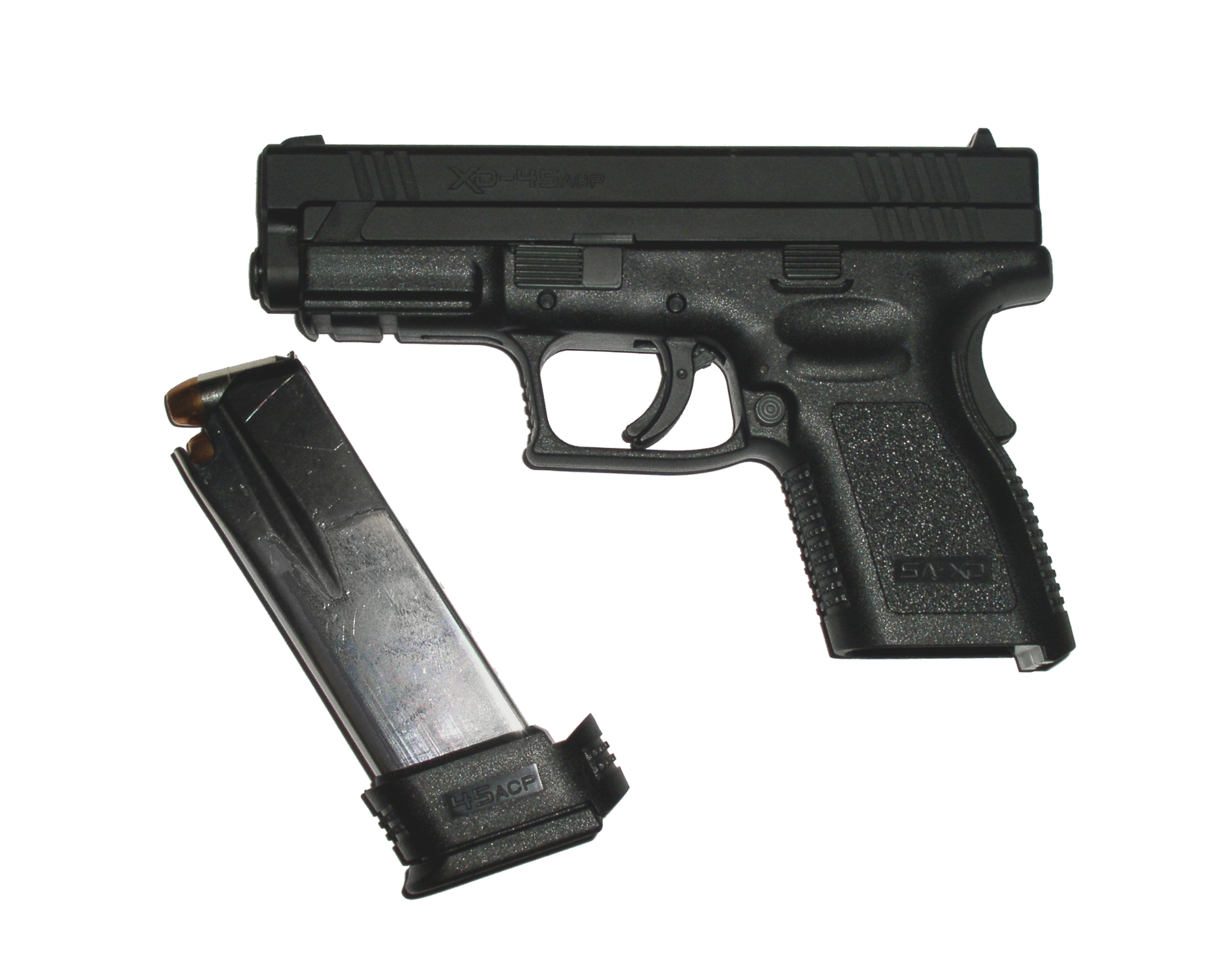
- A Compact XD chambered in .45 ACP with 13-round magazine
- Type: Semi-automatic pistol
- Place of origin: Croatia

Service history
- Used by: See Users

Production history
- Designer: Marko Vuković
- Designed: c. 1999
- Manufacturer: HS Produkt Springfield Armory, Inc.
- Produced: 2002–present
- Variants: See Variants

Specifications
- Cartridge: 9×19mm Parabellum; .357 SIG; .40 S&W; .45 GAP; .45 ACP; 10mm Auto
- Action: Short recoil operated
- Feed system: Detachable box magazine
- Sights: Fixed and illuminated night sights

The Springfield Armory XD is a series of semi-automatic pistols produced by Springfield Armory, Inc., along with follow-on variants: XD-M, XD-S, and XD-E. Polymer-framed and predominantly striker-fired, the series is manufactured by HS Produkt in Karlovac, Croatia.

== History ==
In 2002, Springfield Armory, Inc., negotiated licensing rights to the United States market for the polymer-frame striker-fired HS2000 pistol being manufactured in Croatia by HS Produkt.

Using XD (eXtreme Duty) branding, Springfield Armory subsequently expanded the series to include ten models in three different calibers and five different cartridges, seven barrel lengths, and six finishes (black, black bi-tone, olive drab, olive drab bi-tone, flat dark earth, and flat dark earth bi-tone). The XD sub-compact was named "Pistol of the Year" by American Rifleman for 2003, followed by the XD chambered in .45 ACP being named "Handgun of the Year" by both American Rifleman and the Shooting Industry Academy of Excellence for 2006.

The XD-M variant (Note: Springfield Armory, Inc., consistently uses a hyphen in the names of XD-series variants, such as XD-M, in published documents such as press releases. The name may appear styled as XD^{M} on their website, or written as XDM or XD(M) with inconsistent capitalization in other contexts.) (where 'M' represents match grade) was introduced in 2007; it won "Handgun of the Year" from American Rifleman for 2009. The most noticeable differences from the original XD models are the interchangeable back-straps and match-grade barrel. The first XD-M was chambered in .40 S&W with a 4.5-inch (110 mm) barrel, holding 16 rounds in the magazine. This was soon followed by 9×19mm Parabellum (9mm) and .45 ACP chamberings. In 2018, 10mm Auto was added. The XD-M series is also produced as compact pistols in .40 S&W, .45 ACP and 9mm with 3.8-inch (97 mm) barrels. A "competition" series is chambered in 9mm, 10mm Auto, .40 S&W, and .45 ACP with a 5.25-inch (133 mm) barrel, remotely resembling the tactical XD pistols with 5-inch (130 mm) barrels.

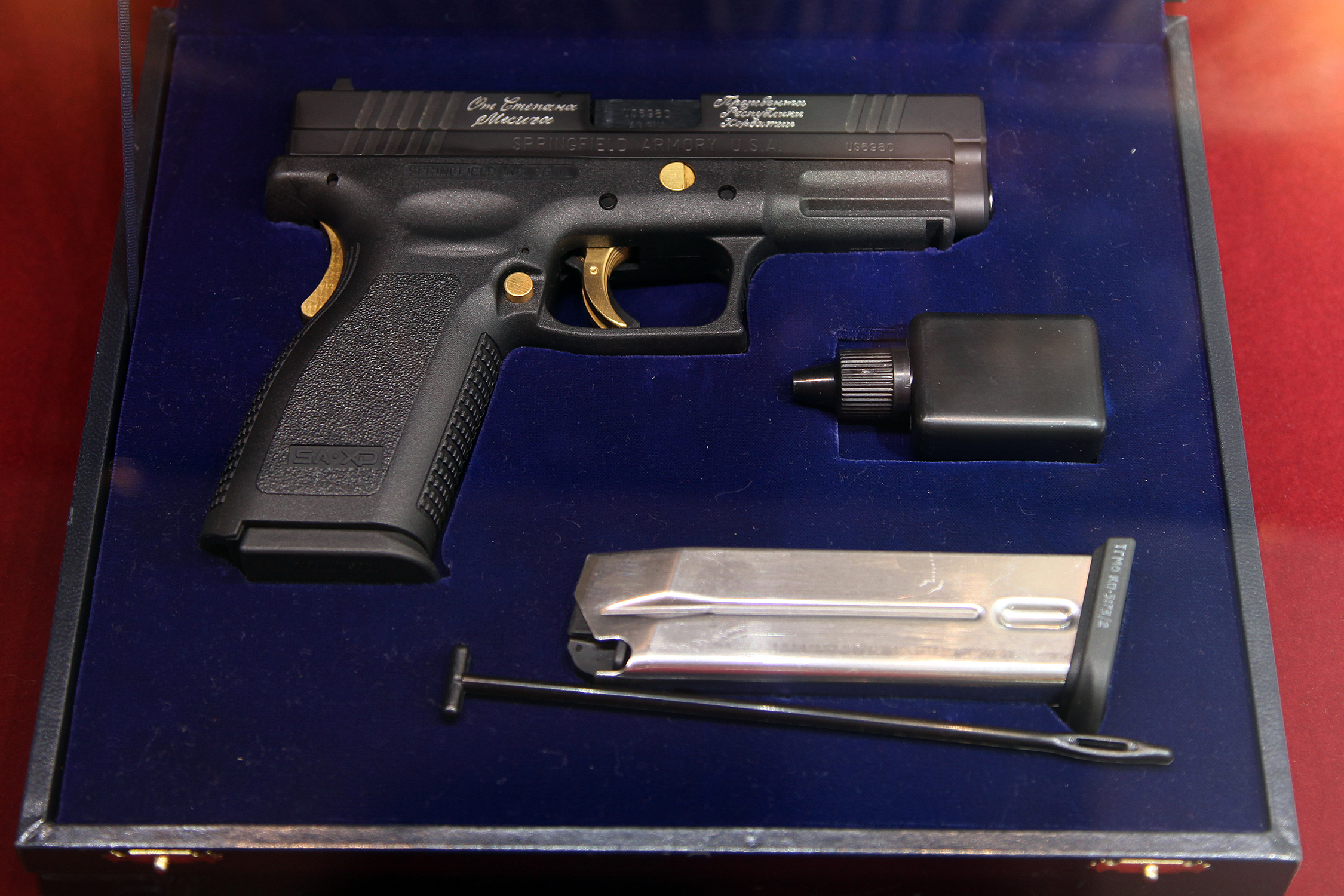
An XD series pistol chambered in .40 Smith & Wesson at the Tula State Museum of Weapons

In January 2012, Springfield Armory announced a new variant, marketed as the XD-S. The 'S' represents the single-stack magazine used, providing a slimmer grip. While sharing many features with the original XD and XD-M, the XD-S included a new pre-set trigger and a disassembly fail-safe, neither of which were available in XD or XD-M models. The fail-safe disassembly prevents the disassembly lever from being manipulated when there is a magazine in the pistol. Conversely, when the disassembly lever is up, a magazine cannot be inserted into the pistol. This model, at only 1 inch (25 mm) wide and initially available only in .45 ACP, is specifically designed for concealed carry. The .45 ACP XD-S has a 5+1 capacity (with optional 6+1 and 7+1 magazines) and a 3.3-inch (84 mm) barrel. In January 2013, an XD-S chambered in 9×19mm Parabellum (9mm) was introduced. It is the same as the .45 ACP model, the only difference being that the 9mm XD-S has a 7+1 capacity (with optional 8+1 and 9+1 magazines) and is marginally heavier due to a smaller barrel bore.

In 2014, Springfield Armory unveiled the XD Mod.2, increasing their XD lineup to 33 offerings. The XD Mod.2 includes ergonomic improvements, the most notable of which is the "Grip Zone"; three differently textured areas on the grip, each with their own unique texturing, in contrast to the original XD design with traditional grip texturing. The pistol also has a new set of sights. Springfield Armory upgraded the front sight to a red fiber optic. The rear sight is still a two dot, though its profile has been lowered, and is still constructed of steel to facilitate its use in racking the slide.

In 2017, Springfield Armory added the XD-E, with the 'E' denoting that the variant uses an external hammer; operation is double action / single action (DA/SA). Originally offered in 9mm, a version chambered in .45 ACP was subsequently added.

In 2018, the company introduced a refresh to the XD-S, the XD-S Mod.2 variant. Included in the refresh are safeties on the grip and trigger. Also introduced in 2018 was an XD-M chambered in 10mm Auto.

== Reception ==
Reception for the Springfield Armory XD has been largely positive. Many high-profile shooters and gun experts have spoken highly of the XD line, including Massad Ayoob and Ron Avery. Following the introduction of the XDM 5.25" model (which was designed with input by USPSA National Champion Rob Leatham) and, later, the XDM Elite series, the XD has steadily grown in popularity with the competition shooting market. The XDM Elite series, with further improvements designed for professional shooters such as a flared magwell, improved sights and increased capacity, continued the XD's rise in competitive popularity.

The XD-S in 9mm was named "Handgun of the Year" by American Rifleman for 2013. In 2021, the XDM Elite was awarded a Reader's Choice Award by Ballistic’s Best magazine.

== Variants ==
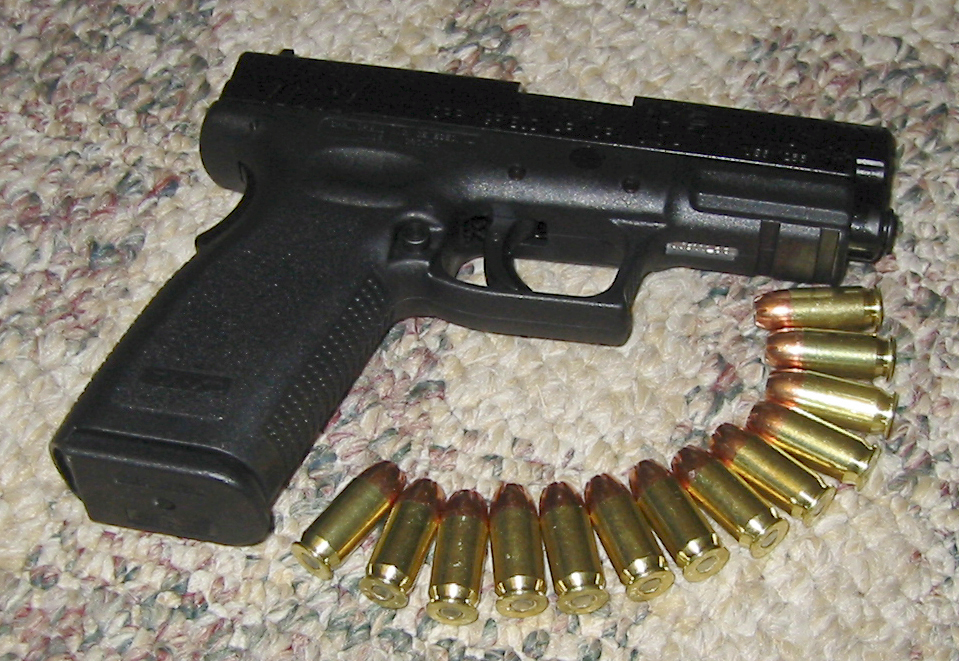
An XD chambered in .45 ACP with 13 rounds of JHP

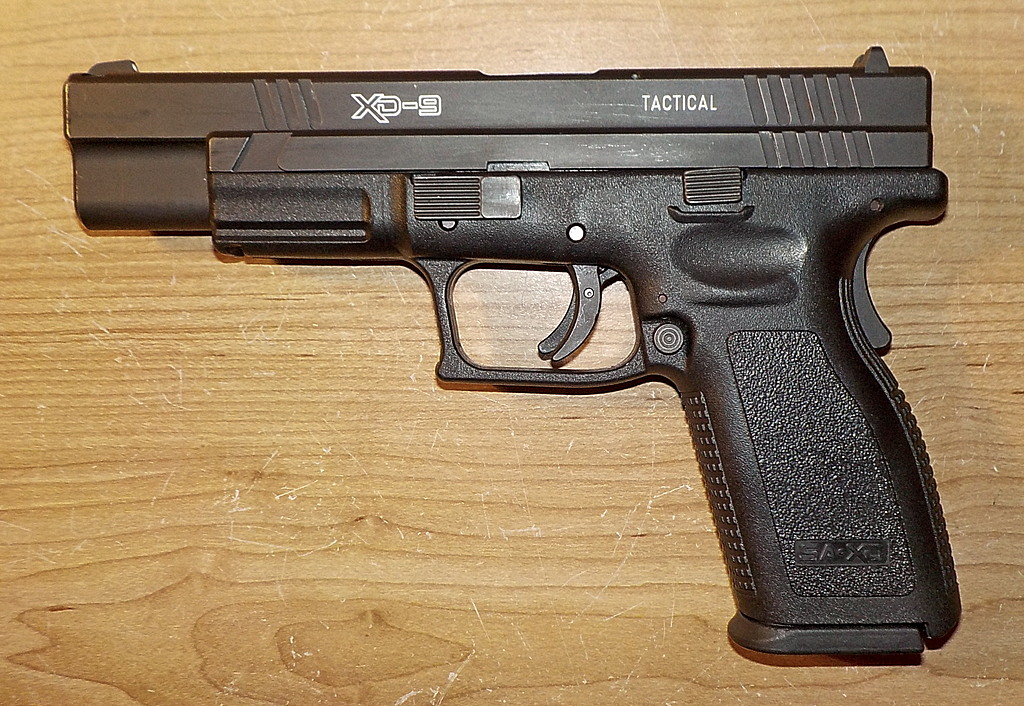
Springfield Armory XD Tactical 9mm

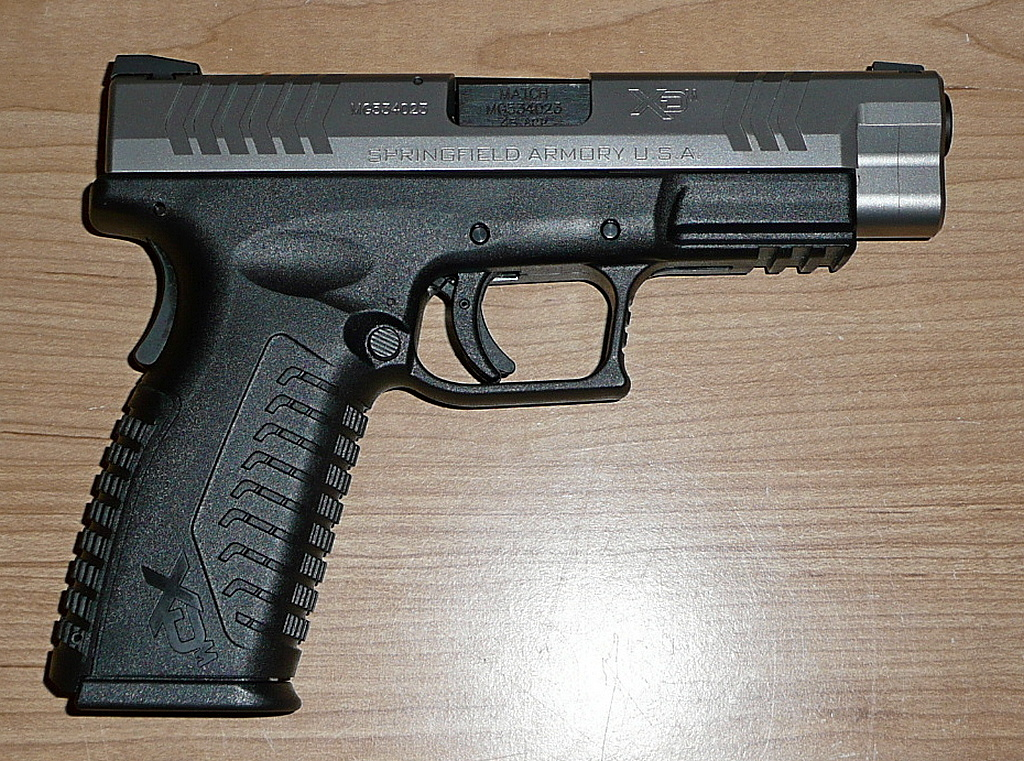
Springfield Armory XD-M .45 ACP

As of March 2020, the XD series has been offered in four branding variants (XD, XD-M, XD-S, XD-E), with XD and XD-S also offered in second generation (Mod.2) configurations.

Variant	Cartridges	Barrel lengths	Sub-variants	Ref.
XD	9mm.357 SIG.40 S&W.45 ACP.45 GAP	3.0 in (76 mm); 4.0 in (100 mm); 5.0 in (130 mm)	Sub-compact; Compact; Service; Ported; Tactical	
XD Mod.2	9mm.40 S&W.45 ACP	3.0 in (76 mm); 3.3 in (84 mm); 4.0 in (100 mm); 5.0 in (130 mm)	Sub-compact; Service; Threaded barrel Tactical	
XD-M	9mm.40 S&W.45 ACP; 10mm	3.8 in (97 mm); 4.5 in (110 mm); 5.25 in (133 mm)	(Standard); Compact; Competition; OSP; Threaded Barrel; Elite	
XD-S	9mm.40 S&W.45 ACP	3.3 in (84 mm); 4.0 in (100 mm)	—	
XD-S Mod.2	9mm.40 S&W.45 ACP	3.3 in (84 mm)	—	
XD-E	9mm.45 ACP	3.3 in (84 mm); 3.8 in (97 mm); 4.5 in (110 mm)	—	

Notes:

- Not all possible combinations of the above listed parameters have been offered.
- Limited-capacity magazines are available for states with bans on certain magazine capacities.
- Capacities in the below tables reflect magazine capacity "plus one", for a round in the chamber.

=== XD ===
Model	Cartridge	Barrel length	Overall length	Height	Weight	Capacity	Notes	Ref.
Sub-compact	9mm	3.0 in (76 mm)	6.25 in (159 mm)	4.75 in (121 mm)	26 oz (740 g)	13+1	16+1 w/ extended mag	
Sub-compact	.40 S&W	3.0 in (76 mm)	6.25 in (159 mm)	4.75 in (121 mm)	26 oz (740 g)	9+1	12+1 w/ extended mag	
Compact	.45 ACP	4.0 in (100 mm)	7.3 in (190 mm)	5.0 in (130 mm)	29 oz (820 g)	10+1	13+1 w/ extended mag	
Compact	.45 ACP	5.0 in (130 mm)	8.3 in (210 mm)	5.0 in (130 mm)	32 oz (910 g)	10+1	13+1 w/ extended mag	
Service	9mm	4.0 in (100 mm)	7.3 in (190 mm)	5.5 in (140 mm)	28 oz (790 g)	16+1		
Service	.357 SIG	4.0 in (100 mm)	7.3 in (190 mm)	5.5 in (140 mm)	30 oz (850 g)	12+1		
Service	.40 S&W	4.0 in (100 mm)	7.3 in (190 mm)	5.5 in (140 mm)	30 oz (850 g)	12+1		
Service	.45 ACP	4.0 in (100 mm)	7.3 in (190 mm)	5.75 in (146 mm)	30 oz (850 g)	13+1	optional thumb safety	
Service	.45 GAP	4.0 in (100 mm)	7.3 in (190 mm)	5.75 in (146 mm)	27 oz (770 g)	9+1		
Ported	9mm	4.0 in (100 mm)	7.3 in (190 mm)	5.5 in (140 mm)	28 oz (790 g)	16+1		
Ported	.357 SIG	4.0 in (100 mm)	7.3 in (190 mm)	5.5 in (140 mm)	27 oz (770 g)	12+1		
Ported	.40 S&W	4.0 in (100 mm)	7.3 in (190 mm)	5.5 in (140 mm)	30 oz (850 g)	12+1		
Tactical	9mm	5.0 in (130 mm)	8.3 in (210 mm)	5.5 in (140 mm)	29 oz (820 g)	16+1		
Tactical	.357 SIG	5.0 in (130 mm)	8.3 in (210 mm)	5.5 in (140 mm)	33 oz (940 g)	12+1		
Tactical	.40 S&W	5.0 in (130 mm)	8.3 in (210 mm)	5.5 in (140 mm)	33 oz (940 g)	12+1		
Tactical	.45 ACP	5.0 in (130 mm)	8.3 in (210 mm)	5.75 in (146 mm)	33 oz (940 g)	13+1	optional thumb safety	
Tactical	.45 GAP	5.0 in (130 mm)	8.3 in (210 mm)	5.75 in (146 mm)	31 oz (880 g)	9+1		

As of March 2020, for the XD series, the only offerings listed on the company's website are sub-compact (in 9mm and .40 S&W) and service models (in 9mm, .40 S&W, and .45 ACP).

==== XD Mod.2 ====
Model	Cartridge	Barrel length	Overall length	Height	Weight	Capacity	Notes	Ref.
Sub-compact	9mm	3.0 in (76 mm)	6.25 in (159 mm)	4.75 in (121 mm)	26 oz (740 g)	13+1	16+1 w/ extended mag	
Sub-compact	.40 S&W	3.0 in (76 mm)	6.25 in (159 mm)	4.75 in (121 mm)	26 oz (740 g)	9+1	12+1 w/ extended mag	
Sub-compact	.45 ACP	3.3 in (84 mm)	6.5 in (170 mm)	4.75 in (121 mm)	26 oz (740 g)	9+1	13+1 w/ extended mag	
Service	9mm	4.0 in (100 mm)	7.3 in (190 mm)	5.5 in (140 mm)	27.5 oz (780 g)	16+1		
Service	.40 S&W	4.0 in (100 mm)	7.3 in (190 mm)	5.5 in (140 mm)	29.5 oz (840 g)	12+1		
Service	.45 ACP	4.0 in (100 mm)	7.3 in (190 mm)	5.75 in (146 mm)	30 oz (850 g)	13+1		
Threaded barrel	9mm	4.0 in (100 mm)	7.85 in (199 mm)	6.0 in (150 mm)	29 oz (820 g)	16+1		
Tactical	9mm	5.0 in (130 mm)	8.3 in (210 mm)	5.5 in (140 mm)	29 oz (820 g)	16+1		
Tactical	.45 ACP	5.0 in (130 mm)	8.1 in (210 mm)	5.75 in (146 mm)	31 oz (880 g)	13+1		

As of March 2020, for the XD Mod.2 series, the only offerings listed on the company's website are sub-compact and service models, both in 9mm and .45 ACP.

=== XD-M ===
M = Match grade

Model	Cartridge	Barrel length	Overall length	Height	Weight	Capacity	Notes	Ref.
(Standard)	9mm	3.8 in (97 mm)	7.0 in (180 mm)	5.6 in (140 mm)	27.5 oz (780 g)	19+1	2 slide finishes	
(Standard)	9mm	4.5 in (110 mm)	8.0 in (200 mm)		32 oz (910 g)	19+1	4 slide/frame combinations	
(Standard)	.40 S&W	3.8 in (97 mm)	7.0 in (180 mm)	5.6 in (140 mm)	28 oz (790 g)	16+1	2 slide finishes	
(Standard)	.40 S&W	4.5 in (110 mm)	8.0 in (200 mm)		32 oz (910 g)	16+1	4 slide/frame combinations	
(Standard)	.45 ACP	4.5 in (110 mm)	8.0 in (200 mm)	5.75 in (146 mm)	31 oz (880 g)	13+1	2 slide finishes	
(Standard)	10mm	4.5 in (110 mm)	7.7 in (200 mm)	5.75 in (146 mm)	31.2 oz (880 g)	15+1	1 slide finish	
(Standard)	10mm	5.25 in (133 mm)	8.3 in (210 mm)	5.75 in (146 mm)	32.8 oz (930 g)	15+1	1 slide finish	
Compact	9mm	3.8 in (97 mm)	7.0 in (180 mm)	4.75 in (121 mm)	27.5 oz (780 g)	13+1	2 slide finishes	
Compact	.40 S&W	3.8 in (97 mm)	6.75 in (171 mm)	4.75 in (121 mm)	28 oz (790 g)	11+1	2 slide finishes	
Compact	.45 ACP	3.8 in (97 mm)	7 in (180 mm)	4.75 in (121 mm)	27 oz (770 g)	9+1	2 slide finishes	
Competition	9mm	5.25 in (133 mm)	8.2 in (210 mm)	5.75 in (146 mm)	29 oz (820 g)	19+1	2 slide finishes	
Competition	.40 S&W	5.25 in (133 mm)	8.2 in (210 mm)	5.75 in (146 mm)	32 oz (910 g)	16+1	2 slide finishes	
Competition	.45 ACP	5.25 in (133 mm)	8.3 in (210 mm)	5.75 in (146 mm)	32 oz (910 g)	13+1	2 slide finishes	
OSP	9mm	5.30 in (135 mm)	8.6 in (220 mm)	5.5 in (140 mm)	29 oz (820 g)	19+1	1 slide finish	
OSP	10mm	5.30 in (135 mm)	8.74 in (222 mm)	5.5 in (140 mm)	29 oz (820 g)	15+1	1 slide finish	
Threaded barrel	9mm	5.30 in (135 mm)	8.25 in (210 mm)	6 in (150 mm)	29 oz (820 g)	19+1	1 slide finish	
Threaded barrel	.45 ACP	5.30 in (135 mm)	8.4 in (210 mm)	6 in (150 mm)	31 oz (880 g)	13+1	1 slide finish	
Elite	9mm	3.8 in (97 mm)	6.75 in (171 mm)	5.75 in (146 mm)	28 oz (790 g)	20+1	Black Melonite slide	
Elite	9mm	4.5 in (110 mm)	7.6 in (190 mm)	5.75 in (146 mm)	29 oz (820 g)	20+1	Black Melonite slide	
Elite	9mm	4.5 in (110 mm)	8.6 in (220 mm)	5.875 in (149.2 mm)	30 oz (850 g)	22+1	Tactical OSP	
Elite	9mm	5.25 in (133 mm)	8.3 in (210 mm)	5.875 in (149.2 mm)	30 oz (850 g)	22+1	FDE slide	

Notes:

- Standard models: the .40 S&W chambering with 3.8-inch barrel has been discontinued.
- Compact models: these have been discontinued.
- Competition models: the .40 S&W offering has been discontinued.
- OSP models: these have threaded barrels and a removable plate on the slide, allowing a red dot sight to be installed.
- Threaded barrel models: the 9mm offering has been discontinued.
- Elite models: the Tactical OSP offering has a threaded barrel and is optics-ready; the slide is a flat dark earth color.

=== XD-S ===
S = Single stack

Model	Cartridge	Barrel length	Overall length	Height	Weight	Capacity	Notes	Ref.
3.3-inch	9mm	3.3 in (84 mm)	6.3 in (160 mm)	4.4 in (110 mm)	23 oz (650 g)	7+1	8+1 w/ extended mag	
3.3-inch	.40 S&W	3.3 in (84 mm)	6.3 in (160 mm)	4.4 in (110 mm)	22 oz (620 g)	6+1	7+1 w/ extended mag	
3.3-inch	.45 ACP	3.3 in (84 mm)	6.3 in (160 mm)	4.4 in (110 mm)	21.5 oz (610 g)	5+1		
4-inch	9mm	4.0 in (100 mm)	7.0 in (180 mm)	4.4 in (110 mm)	25 oz (710 g)	7+1	8+1 w/ extended mag	
4-inch	.45 ACP	4.0 in (100 mm)	7.0 in (180 mm)	4.4 in (110 mm)	23.5 oz (670 g)	5+1	6+1 w/ extended mag	

As of March 2020, the original XD-S series offerings are no longer listed on the company's website.

==== XD-S Mod.2 ====
Model	Cartridge	Barrel length	Overall length	Height	Weight	Capacity	Notes	Ref.
3.3-inch	9mm	3.3 in (84 mm)	6.3 in (160 mm)	4.7 in (120 mm)	21.5 oz (610 g)	7+1	9+1 w/ extended mag	
3.3-inch	.40 S&W	3.3 in (84 mm)	6.3 in (160 mm)	4.7 in (120 mm)	22 oz (620 g)	6+1	7+1 w/ extended mag	
3.3-inch	.45 ACP	3.3 in (84 mm)	6.5 in (170 mm)	4.66 in (118 mm)	21.5 oz (610 g)	5+1	6+1 w/ extended mag	

=== XD-E ===
E = External hammer

Model	Cartridge	Barrel length	Overall length	Height	Weight	Capacity	Notes	Ref.
3.3-inch	9mm	3.3 in (84 mm)	6.75 in (171 mm)	5.0 in (130 mm)	25 oz (710 g)	8+1	9+1 w/ extended mag	
3.3-inch	.45 ACP	3.3 in (84 mm)	6.75 in (171 mm)	5.0 in (130 mm)	23 oz (650 g)	6+1	7+1 w/ extended mag	
3.8-inch	9mm	3.8 in (97 mm)	7.16 in (182 mm)	5.0 in (130 mm)	24 oz (680 g)	8+1	9+1 w/ extended mag	
4.5-inch	9mm	4.5 in (110 mm)	7.87 in (200 mm)	5.0 in (130 mm)	25 oz (710 g)	8+1	9+1 w/ extended mag	

== Users ==
- United States: Issued or approved for use by a large number of police departments and other law enforcement agencies, including the New York City Police Department, Chicago Police Department, Beverly Hills Police Department, Lake Ozark Police Department, Seattle Police Department and the Houston Police Department.

== Notes ==
There is an XD Mod.3 not yet listed above. There is an XD Mod.4 not yet listed above.
