= Springfield Armory SAINT =

Series of semi-automatic rifles

- Type: Semi-automatic firearm
- Place of origin: United States

Production history
- Designed: c. 2016
- Manufacturer: Springfield Armory, Inc.
- Unit cost: $919 (MSRP, SAINT) $1073 (MSRP, SAINT Victor) $1299 (MSRP, SAINT Edge)
- Produced: 2016–present
- Variants: Victor, Edge

Specifications (SAINT Rifle)
- Mass: 6 lb 11 oz (3.0 kg)
- Length: 32.25–35.5 in (819–902 mm)
- Barrel length: 16 in (410 mm)
- Cartridge: 5.56×45mm NATO; .300 AAC Blackout; .308 Winchester
- Action: Gas-operated reloading
- Rate of fire: Semi-automatic
- Feed system: Detachable box magazine
- Sights: Iron sights; Rail Integration System for optics

The Springfield Armory SAINT (Note: SAINT is consistently capitalized by Springfield Armory, Inc., although it is not known to be an acronym.) is a series of AR-15 style semi-automatic firearms manufactured by Springfield Armory, Inc. Introduced in November 2016, the series includes rifles, short-barreled rifles (SBRs), and pistols. Variants are marketed under the SAINT, SAINT Victor, and SAINT Edge brand names. The series is primarily chambered for 5.56 NATO, while some models are also available in .308 Winchester or .300 Blackout.

== History ==
The initial SAINT offering was an AR-15 style rifle with a 16-inch (410 mm) barrel and chambered in 5.56 NATO, introduced in November 2016. It was subsequently named the 2017 tactical gun of the year by American Rifleman magazine. In November 2017, a pistol version including a forearm brace was introduced. A pistol model chambered in .300 Blackout was added in April 2018. The rifle offering was updated in July 2019 with an M-LOK compatible handguard and optional flip-up front sight, while a refreshed pistol debuted in October 2019.

The SAINT Edge variant was introduced in mid-November 2017, featuring a modular trigger system, mid-sized charging handle, and muzzle brake. A year later, a pistol version of the Edge was added. Two additional Edge pistols with different braces were announced in January 2020.

The mid-range SAINT Victor variant, in rifle, pistol, and short-barreled rifle offerings, was announced in January 2019. Models chambered for .308 Winchester were later announced; rifle in April 2019, and pistol in January 2020.

== Variants ==
In February 2019, Springfield Armory contrasted the SAINT, SAINT Victor, and SAINT Edge rifle offerings as follows:

Specification	SAINT	SAINT Victor	SAINT Edge
Receiver	Forged		Billet
Trigger	GI-style (curved)	Single-stage Flat	Single-stage Flat, Short-reset
Charging handle	GI-style		Mid-sized
Bolt carrier group	M16	Enhanced M16	
Handguard	KeyMod	M-LOK (long)	M-LOK (shorter)
Sights	A2 (fixed front)	Flip-up	
Safety selector	Single-sided		Ambidextrous
Weight	6 lb 11 oz (3.0 kg)	6 lb 9 oz (3.0 kg)	6 lb 3 oz (2.8 kg)

As of May 2020, the Springfield Armory website lists three different SAINT rifle offerings, each of which features an M-LOK handguard and M16 (non-enhanced) bolt carrier group; one has flip-up sights and two have an A2 (fixed front) sight. Users of the SAINT have also noted older variants with an enhanced M16 bolt carrier group and no sights.

As of May 2020, there are 24 total variants listed on the Springfield Armory website:

- SAINT: 3 rifle, 2 pistol
- SAINT Victor: 7 rifle, 7 pistol
- SAINT Edge: 2 rifle, 3 pistol (1 available, 2 "coming soon")

The following chamberings have been made available:

Type	SAINT	SAINT Victor	SAINT Edge
Rifle	5.56 NATO	5.56 NATO / .308 Win	5.56 NATO
Short-barreled rifle	—	5.56 NATO	5.56 NATO
Pistol	5.56 NATO / .300 BLK	5.56 NATO / .300 BLK / .308 Win	5.56 NATO

Items in italics have been discontinued.

== Users ==
- United States
  - Lake Ozark Police Department: Received SAINT Victor rifles.
