= Springfield Armory Hellcat =

Polymer frame semi-automatic handgun

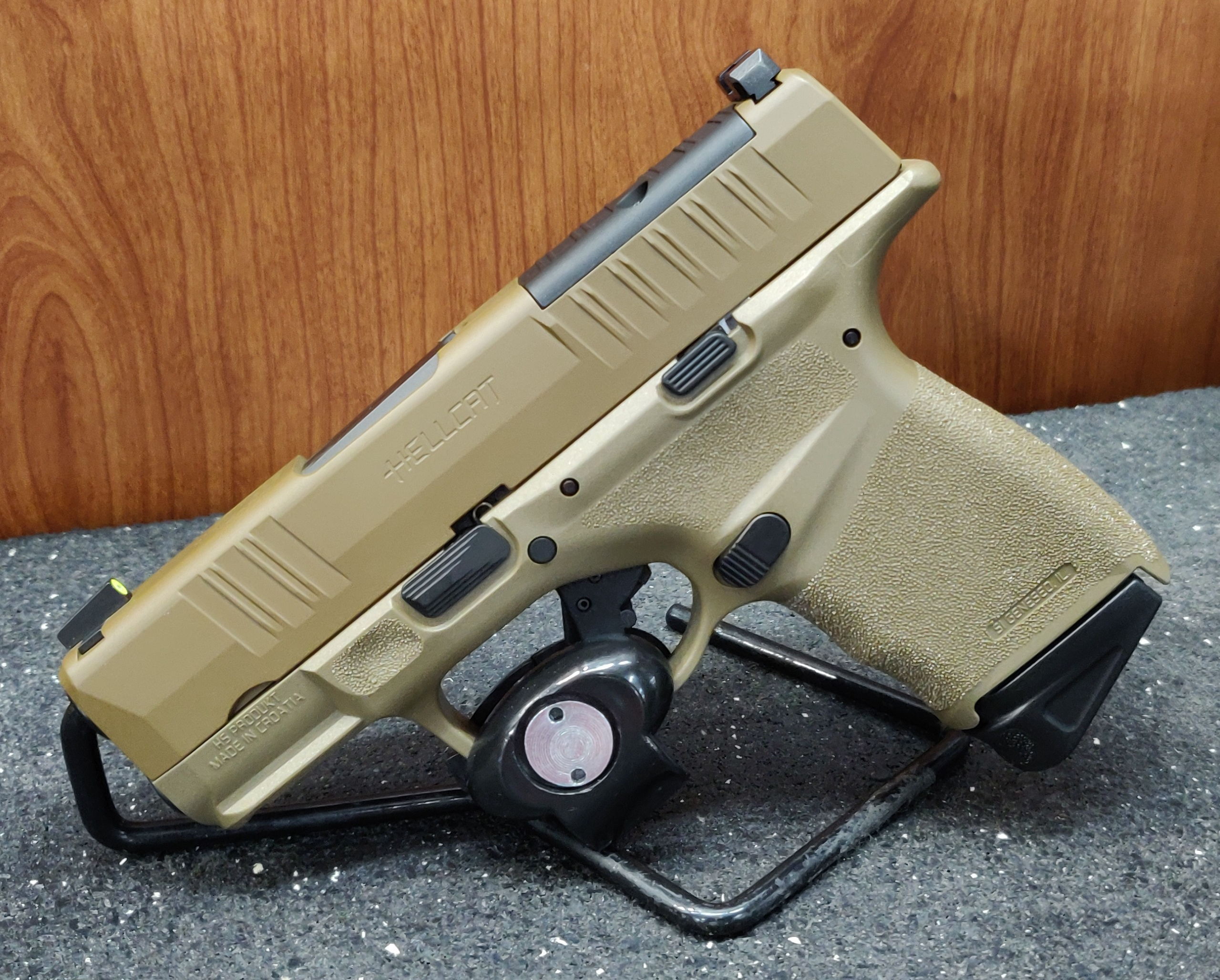
- Springfield Armory Hellcat with a trigger lock
- Type: Semi-automatic pistol
- Place of origin: Croatia

Production history
- Designed: c. 2019
- Manufacturer: HS Produkt
- Unit cost: $569 (MSRP, standard version) $599 (MSRP, OSP version) $653 (MSRP, .380 ACP version)
- Produced: 2019–present

Specifications
- Mass: 17.9 to 18.6 oz (510 to 530 g)
- Length: 6.0 in (150 mm)
- Barrel length: 3.0 in (76 mm)
- Width: 1.0 in (25 mm)
- Height: 4.0 in (100 mm)
- Cartridge: 9×19mm Parabellum.380 ACP
- Action: Striker-fired
- Rate of fire: Semi-automatic
- Feed system: Detachable box magazine; capacities: 10 rounds (restricted); 11 rounds (standard); 13 rounds (extended); 15 rounds (extended); 17 rounds (extended)
- Sights: Iron sights; OSP version allows adding a red dot sight

The Springfield Armory Hellcat is a polymer frame striker-fired micro-compact semi-automatic pistol sold in the United States by Springfield Armory, Inc., and manufactured in Croatia by HS Produkt. Introduced in September 2019, it is chambered in 9×19mm Parabellum and intended for concealed carry, with 10-, 11-, 13-, 15-, and 17-Round magazines. In 2025, Springfield introduced a new model chambered in .380 ACP.

== Features ==
The Hellcat is a striker-fired handgun with a stainless steel slide. Sub-compact in size, its overall length is 6.0 inches (150 mm) with a barrel length of 3.0 inches (76 mm) and a width of 1.0 inch (25 mm). There is a blade safety on the trigger, and an optional low-profile external ambidextrous manual thumb safety.

The 11-round flush-fit magazine holds one more round than the SIG Sauer P365. The .380 ACP variant comes with 11- and 13-round magazines.

The slide has cocking serrations fore and aft, the rear extending over the top of the gun to provide three points of positive grip for manipulating the slide. The Hellcat also includes an accessory rail for mounting lights and lasers.

== Versions ==
The OSP ("Optic Sight Pistol") version of the Hellcat has a removable plate on the slide, which allows a red dot sight to be installed.

The Hellcat Pro OSP also has co-witnessing U-Dot sights, with a high visibility tritium & luminescent front sight and Tactical Rack rear sight.

Upon introduction, the Hellcat was only available in the color black. In June 2020, Springfield Armory introduced a version of the Hellcat in a flat dark earth (FDE) color.

== Accolades ==
The Hellcat was named 2020 Handgun of the Year by American Rifleman magazine.
