= Springfield Armory Echelon =

Polymer frame semi-automatic handgun

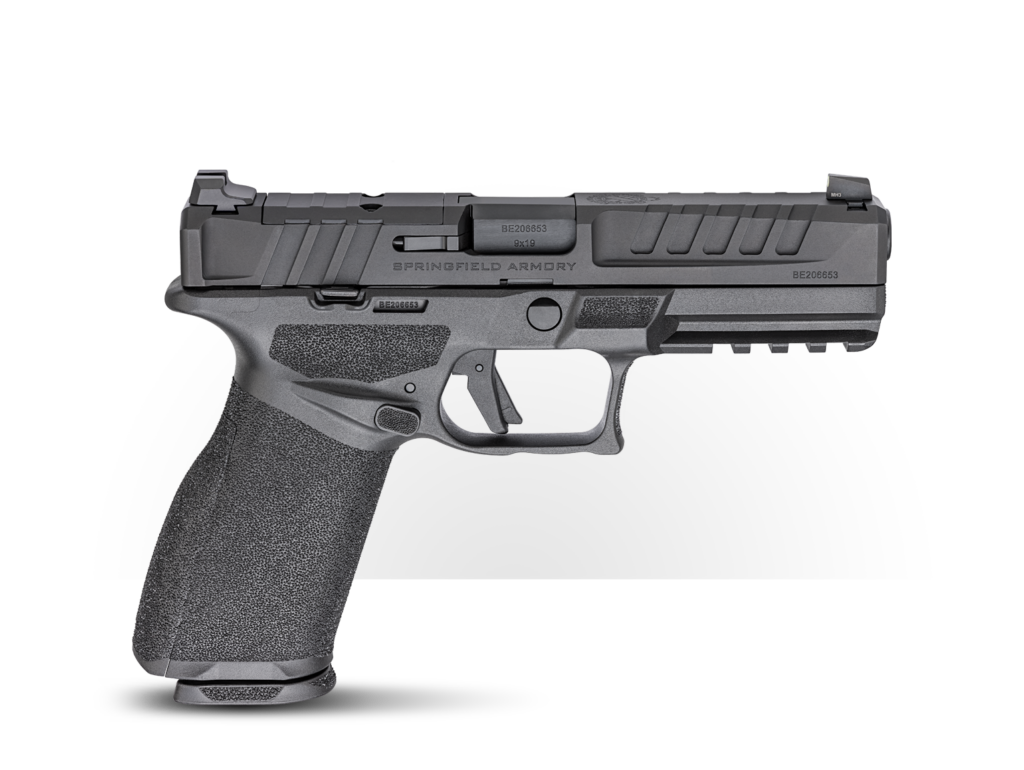
- Springfield Armory Echelon 4.5
- Type: Semi-automatic pistol
- Place of origin: Croatia

Production history
- Manufacturer: HS Produkt
- Unit cost: $679 (MSRP, standard version) $719 (MSRP, OSP version)
- Produced: 2023–present

Specifications
- Mass: 23.9 to 24.3 oz (680 to 690 g)
- Length: 8.00 in (203 mm)
- Barrel length: 4.50 in (114 mm)
- Width: 1.20 in (30 mm)
- Height: 5.50 in (140 mm)
- Cartridge: 9×19mm Parabellum
- Action: Striker-fired short recoil, locked breech, tilting barrel
- Rate of fire: Semi-automatic
- Feed system: 10-, 17- or 20-round detachable steel box magazines
- Sights: Iron sights; OSP version allows adding a red dot sight

The Springfield Armory Echelon is a polymer frame striker-fired semi-automatic pistol line sold in the United States by Springfield Armory, Inc., and manufactured in Croatia by HS Produkt. Introduced in July 2023, it is chambered in 9×19mm Parabellum and primarily intended for duty sidearm and defensive use and secondary for concealed carry, with 10-, 17- and 20-round magazines.

== Design details ==
The Echelon has a modular, stainless steel self-contained fire-control chassis that is removable for cleaning and maintenance. The manufacturer designates the chassis module as the "Central Operating Group".

To achieve a (for a duty sidearm relatively light 20–25 N (4.5–5.6 lb_{f})) constant trigger pull, the striker mechanism's striker spring is kept under its final firing tension.

The Echelon pistols are designed with independent safety mechanisms to prevent uncommanded discharges. The systems consist of an external integrated trigger safety and automatic internal safeties: a firing pin block safety and a drop safety. Optionally, an additional manual frame-mounted ambidextrous thumb safety can be provided.

The firearm has a loaded chamber indicator. By protruding from the right side of the pistol and displaying a red surface, the extractor/loaded chamber indicator provides tactile and visible confirmation/warning of the presence of a chambered round. The hammer forged barrel and billet machined steel optics ready slide undergo treatment with a proprietary nitriding process called Melonite. The Melonite ferritic nitrocarburizing process used by the manufacturer produces a matte gray non-glare surface with approximately 68 Rockwell C surface hardness rating. The barrel features traditional/conventional 6-groove button rifling with a 250 mm (1 in 10 inches) or 28.3 calibers twist rate.

== Accolades ==
The Echelon was named Guns & Ammo handgun of the year and won the NASGW-POMA 2023 award for best new handgun.

== Users ==
- Bulgaria: Echelon 4.5, being adopted in the Bulgarian Army to replace the Makarov pistol.
- United States: Lake Ozark Police Department and the St. Louis County Police Department in Missouri, Geneseo Police Department, Henry County Sheriff's Office in Illinois, and Goodyear Police Department, Arizona.
- Spain: National Police Corps adopted the Echelon in 2025 to replace Heckler & Koch USPs in service.
