= PHP pistol =

PHP
- Type: Semi-automatic pistol
- Place of origin: Croatia

Service history
- Wars: Croatian War of Independence

Production history
- Manufacturer: IM Metallic
- Produced: 1990–1994
- Variants: MV-9, VM-17

Specifications
- Mass: 985 g (2.172 lb) (empty)
- Length: 195 mm (7.7 in)
- Cartridge: 9×19mm Parabellum (9mm Luger)
- Caliber: 9 mm
- Action: Short recoil operated
- Feed system: Detachable, two column fifteen-round box magazine

The PHP (Croatian: Prvi Hrvatski Pištolj, lit. 'First Croatian pistol') was the first major production pistol in Croatia, chambered in the 9×19mm Parabellum cartridge and manufactured by IM Metallic, today known as HS Produkt.

== History ==
The pistol was hastily developed to supply the Croatian military soon after Croatia gained its independence from Yugoslavia, but it was soon after replaced by the HS2000.

== Design ==
By design, this pistol represents a mix between Beretta 92 and Walther P38 pistols, and takes several design influences that are in both handguns, such as a decocker/safety, double-action/single-action trigger, open-top slide and vertically tilting locking block.

The overall appearance of the pistol mostly resembles the P38, but the magazine capacity and single recoil spring below the barrel is closer to a Beretta. The safety also incorporates a manual decocking lever, located on the left side of the grip frame. It is entirely possible that the safety/decocker was based on the design of the Beretta Cheetah.

== Variants ==
The PHP MV-9 is the most commonly seen variant of the pistol, which has a barrel length of 105 millimetres (4.1 in). The VM-17 has a longer 140-millimetre (5.5 in) barrel and somewhat resembles a Walther P38.
