= Springfield Armory, Inc. =

American firearms manufacturer

- Type: Privately held
- Founded: 1974; 52 years ago
- Headquarters: Geneseo, Illinois, US
- Key people: Dennis Reese, CEO
- Products: Firearms
- Website: springfield-armory.com

Springfield Armory, Inc., is an American commercial firearms manufacturer and importer based in Geneseo, Illinois. Founded in 1974 by Bob Reese and family, the company produces rifles such as the M1A and imports handguns such as the XD series and Hellcat. The company is unrelated to the like-named former manufacturer of US military firearms in Massachusetts, Springfield Armory.

== Formation ==
Elmer C. Ballance began using the name "Springfield Armory" through his company (LH Manufacturing) dedicated to the first civilian production of the M14 rifle, calling it the M1A. Ballance began in San Antonio, Texas, and soon after moved to Devine, Texas, where the company gained momentum and popularity. In 1974, Ballance sold the company to the Reese family, who had a well-established production shop in Illinois and experience base. The company then expanded its market into other firearms, including the M1911. After further success, the company began to branch into even more types of firearms. The company, now run by Dennis Reese (formerly along with his brother Tom Reese), produces numerous firearms in many styles and models, ranging from the AR-pattern SAINT rifles and pistols, to the M1A family, to a wide range of 1911s, to the compact 911 .380 and 9mm pistols, and also a broad selection of polymer-framed pistols. The latter group includes the micro 9mm Hellcat, released in September 2019, which has proven to be popular in the CCW market.

The company has previously (as late as 2017) used a motto, "The First Name in American Firearms", in reference to the original and operationally unrelated Springfield Armory of Springfield, Massachusetts, which was founded in 1777 and closed in 1968. Those two dates are included in a timeline on the company's website, which notes that in 1974 "a passionate family by the name of Reese rescued" the Springfield Armory name.

== Products ==
=== Rifles ===
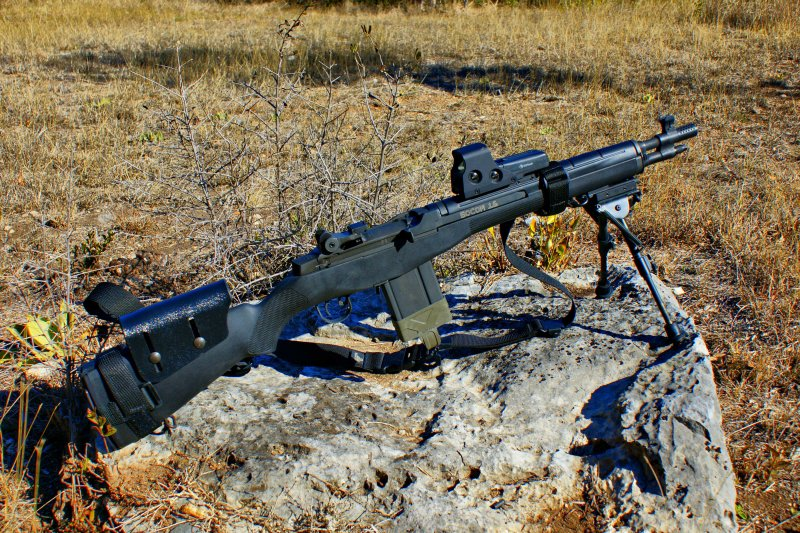
A SOCOM variant of the M1A

The company's rifle offerings include the M1A, the Hellion (imported VHS-2), and the SAINT line of AR-15 style rifles and short-barreled rifles.

The M1A line includes offerings such as standard, loaded, SOCOM, national match, and tanker models. In 2016, the first SAINT rifle was introduced, with a pistol variant following a year later. Variants at different price-points, marketed as SAINT Victor and SAINT Edge, have also been added.

In 2020, they released the all-new Model 2020 Waypoint hunting rifle.

In 2022, Springfield announced they would be importing a civilian version of the HS Produkt VHS-2 under the name of the Springfield Hellion.

Previously, the company offered its own versions of the M1 Garand, Beretta BM59, FN FAL, HK 91 and M6 Scout.

=== Handguns ===
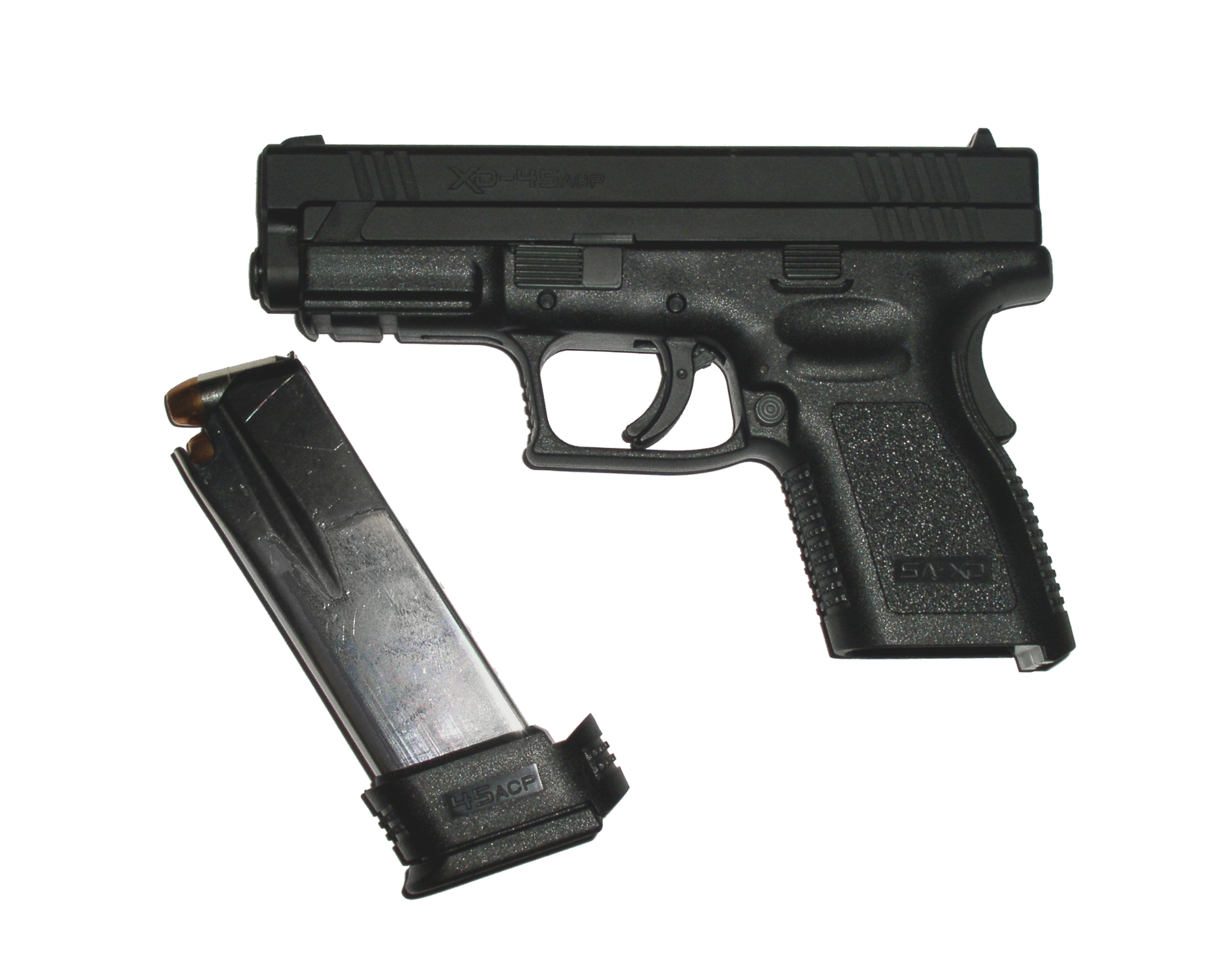
A compact XD chambered in .45 ACP with 13-round magazine

The company's handgun offerings include M1911 pistols, the 911 pistol, and the polymer-frame XD (X-treme Duty) pistol series. The M1911 line includes the Range Officer series, the EMP, Mil-Spec, Garrison, TRP, Ronin and Emissary versions.

The XD-M variant was added in 2007, and the compact concealed carry XD-S line was added in 2012. Second generation XD offerings, branded as XD Mod.2, were introduced in 2014. The XD-E, a variant with an exposed hammer and a double action / single action (DA/SA) trigger system, followed in 2017. In 2018, the XD-S Mod.2, a modernized and upgraded version of the original XD-S, was introduced. In 2019, the company introduced the XD-M Elite line of pistols, which takes the XD-M and adds features such as the META (Match Enhanced Trigger Assembly), extended magazine wells and capacities up to 22 rounds in 9mm, ambidextrous slide locks, and enhanced slide grasping grooves.

In 2018, the company introduced the 911 pistol. The Hellcat micro-compact pistol was introduced in 2019, featuring 11- and 13-round magazines.

In 2021, the company introduced the SA-35 pistol, which is their version of the Browning Hi-Power.

In 2022, the company introduced the 1911 Prodigy DS.

In 2023, the company introduced the Echelon 9mm pistol.

In 2025, the company introduced the Kuna, a 9mm carbine featuring a roller-delayed blowback operating system. The gun is imported from the Croatian manufacturer HS Produkt.

== Other activities ==
Springfield Custom, the company's customization shop, offered a broad line of custom-grade firearms including various M1911 offerings, and upgrades to the company's standard M1911 and XD offerings.

Through 2017, the company had received at least eight Golden Bullseye awards from American Rifleman magazine, the first having been for the XD sub-compact pistol in 2003.

Rob Leatham, a professional shooter who has won multiple national and world titles, has been the captain of "Team Springfield", the practical shooting team, since its inception in 1985.

The co-founder and CEO Dennis Reese accepted NRA Publications’ esteemed Golden Bullseye Pioneer Award at the 2022 NRA Annual Meetings & Exhibits held in Houston, Texas.

=== Political involvement ===
In 2006, the company played a major role in vocally opposing then Governor of Illinois Rod Blagojevich's proposed assault weapons ban that threatened to ban firearm manufacturing in Illinois. Co-owner Dennis Reese responded to the proposed legislation by saying "if this passes, we're out of town."

On July 13, 2007, at the 100th anniversary of the National Matches held at Camp Perry in northern Ohio, Reese announced that the company would provide $1 million towards the NRA's "Competitive Shooting & National Championships Endowment" and challenged other firearms manufacturers to donate to the endowment.

In 2017, the company faced controversy during consideration in the Illinois state legislature of a bill (SB-1657) that would restrict firearms transfers within the state. An organization that Springfield Armory and Rock River Arms—both based in Illinois—provided funding to, the Illinois Firearms Manufacturers Association (IFMA), initially opposed the bill. Following efforts by IFMA's lobbyist, the bill was amended to exempt Illinois-based manufacturers, apparently in exchange for IFMA dropping its opposition to the bill. This action created "tremendous customer backlash" as the deal was made "at the expense of everyday gun owners". This was followed by the IFMA being dissolved and the companies subsequently opposing SB-1657, which was eventually vetoed.

Springfield Armory quickly reacted once the actions of the IFMA were revealed to the company, with the company releasing the following statement from Reese: "I can tell you now, we at Springfield Armory are unequivocally 100 percent against this bill and will continue to work with the NRA and others to ensure that it is defeated. Springfield Armory ... was not aware of the actions taken by trade association, IFMA, until after the fact."
