= Stress testing (computing) =

Testing the stability of something by finding its breaking point

In computing, stress testing (sometimes called torture testing) can be applied to either hardware or software. It is used to determine the maximum capability of a computer system and is often used for purposes such as scaling for production use and ensuring reliability and stability. Stress tests typically involve running a large amount of resource-intensive processes until the system either crashes or nearly does so.

== Hardware ==
A stress test (sometimes called a torture test) of hardware is a form of deliberately intense and thorough testing used to determine the stability of a given system or entity. It involves testing beyond normal operational capacity, often to a breaking point, in order to observe the results.

Reasons can include: to determine breaking points and safe usage limits; to confirm that the intended specifications are being met; to search for issues inside of a product; to determine modes of failure (how exactly a system may fail), and to test stable operation of a part or system outside standard usage. Reliability engineers often test items under expected stress or even under accelerated stress in order to determine the operating life of the item or to determine modes of failure.

The term stress test as it relates to hardware (including electronics, physical devices, nuclear power plants, etc.) is likely to have different refined meanings in specific contexts. One example is in materials, see Fatigue (material).

== Software ==
Stress testing is a software testing activity that determines the robustness of software by testing beyond the limits of normal operation. Stress testing is particularly important for "mission critical" software, but is used for all types of software. Stress tests commonly put a greater emphasis on robustness, availability, and error handling under a heavy load, than on what would be considered correct behavior under normal circumstances.

A system stress test refers to tests that put a greater emphasis on robustness, availability, and error handling under a heavy load, rather than on what would be considered correct behavior under normal circumstances. In particular, the goals of such tests may be to ensure the software does not crash in conditions of insufficient computational resources (such as memory or disk space), unusually high concurrency, or denial of service attacks.

Examples:

- A web server may be stress tested using scripts, bots, and various denial of service tools to observe the performance of a web site during peak loads. These attacks generally are under an hour long, or until a limit in the amount of data that the web server can tolerate is found.

Stress testing may be contrasted with load testing:

- Load testing examines the entire environment and database, while measuring the response time, whereas stress testing focuses on identified transactions, pushing to a level so as to break transactions or systems.
- During stress testing, if transactions are selectively stressed, the database may not experience much load, but the transactions are heavily stressed. On the other hand, during load testing the database experiences a heavy load, while some transactions may not be stressed.
- System stress testing, also known as stress testing, is loading the concurrent users over and beyond the level that the system can handle, so it breaks at the weakest link within the entire system.

== See also ==
- Burn-in
- Destructive testing
- Load and performance test tools
- Black box testing
- Load testing
- Software performance testing
- Scenario analysis
- Simulation
- Software testing
- White box testing
- Technischer Überwachungsverein (TÜV) – product testing and certification
- Concurrency testing using the CHESS model checker
- Jinx automates stress testing by automatically exploring unlikely execution scenarios.
- Highly accelerated life test
