= List of equipment of the Azerbaijani Land Forces =

Equipment of the Azerbaijani Land Forces
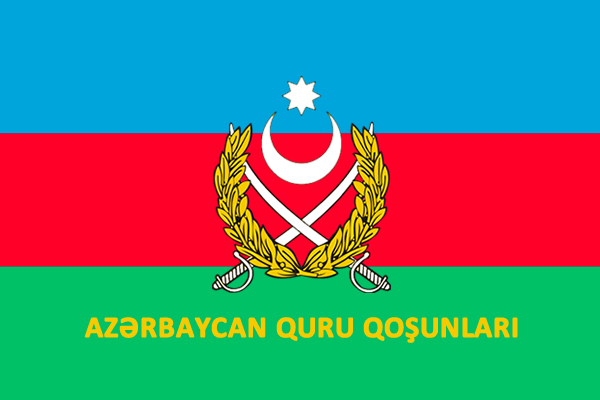
- Emblem of the Azerbaijan Land Forces
- Founded: 26 June 1918
- Current form: c. 1991

This is a list of modern equipment used by the Azerbaijani Land Forces.

== Personnel equipment ==
=== Helmets ===
Model	Image	Origin	Type	Notes
Personnel Armor System for Ground Troops		United States	Combat helmet	
Modular Integrated Communications Helmet		United States	Combat helmet	
Advanced Combat Helmet		United States	Combat Helmet	
SSh-68		Soviet Union	Combat Helmet	
Future Assault Shell Technology helmet		United States	Combat Helmet	

=== Vests ===
Model	Image	Origin	Type	Notes
LBV-88		United States Turkey	Load-bearing vest	Mostly Turkish clones.
6B4		Soviet Union	Bulletproof vest	
6B5 "Ulej"		Soviet Union	Bulletproof vest	
OZA	No image available	Turkey	Bulletproof vest	Produced by Anafarta
Multi-Mission Armor Carrier		United States	Bulletproof vest	
Jumpable Plate Carrier		United States	Bulletproof vest	

=== Night vision goggles ===
Model	Image	Origin	Type	Notes
AN/PVS-7		United States	Night-vision device	
AN/PVS-14		United States	Night-vision device	
AN/PVS-31		United States	Night-vision device	

=== Parachutes ===
Model	Image	Origin	Type	Notes
D-6		Soviet Union	Parachute	

== Infantry weapons ==
Name	Caliber Type	Photo	Country of origin	Notes
Pistols and submachine guns
Makarov pistol	9x18mm Semi-automatic pistol		Soviet Union	
Stechkin automatic pistol	9x18mm 9x19mm Machine pistol		Soviet Union	
TT pistol	7.62x25mm Semi-automatic pistol		Soviet Union	
Zəfər P	9×19mm Hammer-fired pistol		Azerbaijan; Turkey	Zigana K domestically license produced by MODIAR from TİSAŞ. Standard pistol of the Army.
Zəfər	9×19mm Hammer-fired pistol		Azerbaijan; Turkey	Zigana K Compact domestically license produced by MODIAR from TİSAŞ. Standard pistol of the Special Forces.
Inam	9×19mm Hammer-fired Pistol		Azerbaijan; Turkey	Zigana F domestically license produced by MODIAR from TİSAŞ.
Glock 19	9×19mm Striker-fired pistol		Austria	160 Glock pistols purchased in 2013.
SIG Sauer P226	9x19mm Semi-automatic pistol		West Germany Switzerland	
IMI Uzi	9×19mm Submachine gun		Israel	
Heckler & Koch MP5	9x19mm Submachine gun		Germany	
Assault rifles
Aztex AR-15	7.62×39mm Assault rifle		Azerbaijan	Used in Azerbaijani Army Parade.
AK-74M	5.45×39mm Assault rifle		Azerbaijan; Russia	Used by the Army and Marines. Domestically license produced by MODIAR from Kalashnikov Concern.
IWI Tavor X95	5.56×45mm Assault rifle		Israel	Used by Special Forces and Marines.
IWI Tavor TAR-21	5.56×45mm Assault rifle		Israel	Used by Special Forces.
AKM	7.62×39mm Assault rifle		Soviet Union	Used by Internal Troops
AK-74	5.45×39mm Assault rifle		Soviet Union	
AKS-74U	5.45×39mm Carbine		Soviet Union	
PM md. 63	7.62×39 Assault rifle		Socialist Republic of Romania	
M16 rifle	5.56×45mm Assault rifle		United States	Used by DSX and peacekeeping forces
APS underwater rifle	5.66×39mm MPS with 5.66×120mm steel darts and tracer MPST Underwater Assault Rifle		Soviet Union	
AK-105	5.45×39mm Carbine		Russia	Used by DSX
AR-15-style rifle	5.56x45mm Assault rifle		United States	
Beretta ARX160	5.56x45mm 7.62x39mm Assault rifle		Italy	
Light and heavy machine guns
HP-7.62	7.62×54mmR General-purpose machine gun		Azerbaijan	Standard GPMG of the Army.
PK PKM	7.62×54mmR General-purpose machine gun		Soviet Union; Azerbaijan	Used by the Army.
FN Minimi	5.56x45mm Squad Automatic Weapon		Belgium	
DShK	12.7×108mm Heavy machine gun		Soviet Union	Standard infantry HMG of the Army.
NSV	12.7×108mm Heavy machine gun		Soviet Union	Vehicle-mounted.
IWI Negev	5.56×45mm Light machine gun		Israel	
Canik M2 QCB M2 Browning	12.7×99mm Heavy machine gun		Turkey United States	Vehicle-mounted.
Sniper rifles
Yırtıcı	7.62×54mmR Sniper rifle, Designated marksman rifle		Azerbaijan	Primary sniper rifle.
Yalquzaq	7.62×51mm Sniper rifle		Azerbaijan	
Vaşaq	Sniper rifle		Azerbaijan	Based on Yırtıcı
İstiqlal	14.5×114mm Anti-materiel rifle		Azerbaijan	Standard anti-materiel rifle of the Army.
OM 50 Nemesis	12.7×99mm Sniper rifle		Switzerland	Used by Border Guards and Special Forces.
JNG-90	7.62×51mm Sniper rifle		Turkey	
Dragunov SVD	7.62×54mmR Sniper rifle, Designated marksman rifle		Soviet Union	
VSS Vintorez			Russia	
Orsis T-5000	7.62×51mm Sniper rifle		Russia	
RPA Rangemaster	12.7×99mm Anti-materiel rifle		United Kingdom	Used by Border Guards and Special Forces.
Accuracy International Arctic Warfare	7.62×51mm, .338 Lapua Magnum Sniper rifle		United Kingdom	Used by Border Guards and Special Forces.
.338 Edge	Sniper rifle		United States	Used by Border Guards and Special Forces.
CheyTac .308/.375/.408/M300	Sniper rifle		United States	Used by Border Guards and Special Forces.
Accuracy International AW50	12.7×99mm Sniper rifle		United Kingdom	Used by Border Guards and Special Forces.
Steyr SSG 08	7.62×51mm, .338 Lapua Magnum Sniper rifle		Austria	Used by Border Guards and Special Forces.
Steyr SSG M1	Sniper rifle		Austria	Used by Border Guards and Special Forces.
Mubariz-12.7	12.7×108mm Anti-materiel rifle		Azerbaijan	
Denel NTW-20	Anti-materiel rifle		South Africa	
Sako TRG	Sniper rifle		Finland	
MACS M4	12.7×99mm Anti-materiel rifle		Croatia	Used by State Border Service and Special Forces.
PSL	7.62×54mmR Sniper rifle, Designated marksman rifle		Socialist Republic of Romania	
Hand grenades and explosives
F-1	Hand grenade		Azerbaijan; Russia	
Grenade launchers
Milkor MGL	Multiple grenade launcher		Azerbaijan South Africa	
AGS-30	Automatic grenade launcher		Russia	
AGS-17	Automatic grenade launcher		Soviet Union	
GP-25	Grenade launcher		Soviet Union	
M203	Grenade launcher		United States	

== Anti-Armor ==
Name	Image	Origin	Number	Notes
(Anti-tank) Guided Missiles
Spike-LR		Israel	350	[Range: 4 km].
Spike-NLOS		Israel	250	[Range: 25 km], (For use by Mi-17 attack helicopters and Sa'ar 62 patrol vessels).
Spike-ER		Israel	N/A	[Range: 8 km], (Also for use by Shaldag Mk V patrol vessels).
LAHAT		Israel	100	[Range: 13 km], (For use by Mi-17 attack helicopters).
B-300		Israel	N/A	The restart device is in limited supply.
AT-1K		South Korea	70	
9M133 Kornet		Russia	100	In 2009-2010, 100 units were purchased from Russia
9P157-2		Russia	N/A	[Range: 6 km].
9M120 Ataka		Russia	N/A	[Range: 6 km], (For use by Mi-35M attack helicopters).
9K111 Fagot		Soviet Union	N/A	[Range: 2.5 km].
9M113 Konkurs		Soviet Union	N/A	[Range: 4 km].
9K114 Shturm		Soviet Union	N/A	[Range: 5 km], (For use by Mi-24V/P attack helicopters).
Skif		Ukraine	N/A	[Range: 5 km].
R-2 Baryer		Ukraine	N/A	[Range: 5 km], (For use by Mi-24G attack helicopters).
ETR-M		Turkey; Azerbaijan	N/A	[Range: 60+km].
Anti-tank rockets
ALAC	Rocket-propelled grenade		BrazilSweden	50 pieces received, planned to joint production.
RPG-7	Rocket-propelled grenade		Soviet Union	Reusable launcher a variety of anti-personnel and anti-tank munitions available. Also exists newer model RPG-7V; Standard issue.
RPG-18	Rocket-propelled grenade		Soviet Union	
RPG-29	Rocket-propelled grenade		Soviet Union	

== Armored Vehicles ==
Name	Image	Origin	Number	Notes
Tanks
T-90		Russia	93	In 2011, 100 tanks were purchased under a contract with Rosoboronexport. They were delivered to Azerbaijan in 2011-2015.
T-84		Ukraine	Unknown	
T-72		Soviet Union; RussiaIsrael	405	In 2001, 600 T-72Bs were ordered from Russia, 350 T-72A tanks were ordered from Belarus, 153 T-72Bs from Ukraine, 48 T-72M1 tanks were ordered from Ukraine, unknown number of Armenian tanks were captured in military operations, various units have been modernized by Elbit Systems.
Infantry Fighting Vehicles
BMP-3		Russia	118	Together with the Vesna-K thermal launch vehicle. According to the 2013 contract, 119 units were to be delivered.
BMP-2		Soviet Union Israel	300+	
BMP-1		Soviet Union	160+	268 BMP-1 and BMP-2 in service with the State Border Service
Anti-tank Guided missile carriers
9M123 Khrizantema		Russia	37	In 2014, 10 units of Chrysanthemum-S were ordered. The first batch was delivered in June 2015. In 2017, 12 units of Chrysanthemum-S were delivered. In 2018, 15 units of Chrysanthemum-S were delivered.
Armored personnel carrier
BTR-82A		Russia	230	230 units purchased in 2013-2018
BTR-80A		Russia	187	70 were purchased in 2007-2008 117 were purchased in 2008-2010
BTR-80		Soviet Union	210	Purchased from Ukraine and Belarus
MT-LB		Soviet Union	400+	
BTR-70		Soviet Union; Ukraine; Azerbaijan	259	Most have been modernized by Israel's Elbit Systems, 132 are in use, the rest are in reserve.
BRDM-2		Soviet Union	100+	Unknown amount modernized and named "ZKDM".
Light armored cars
AZCAN Sentry APC		Azerbaijan; Canada	Unknown	Produced by AZCAN Defence Solutions, an Azerbaijani-Canadian Corporation. One seen being driven by the President of Azerbaijan during his visit to Karabakh. Some sources indicate that it has been used by the MIA, and other claims there are a handful of prototypes in the country owned by the state in general.
AZCAN Huron APC		Azerbaijan; Canada	Unknown	Produced by AZCAN Defence Solutions, an Azerbaijani-Canadian Corporation. Unknown if in service in the Azerbaijani military.
Humvee		United States	100+	Used by peacekeeping and internal forces.
AIL Storm		Israel	90-150	Unknown amount in service.
AIL Abir		Israel|	110	Unknown amount in service.
Plasan SandCat		Israel	230	10 Sandcat SPEAR 120MM, 10 Spike-LR, 100 basic sandcat (some spotted with drone launchers). R-010SC command and control, MOES-720 mobile electro-optic station, Spike-ER, Mini Samson and Samson MLS variants amongst inventory.
Otokar Cobra		Turkey	350	Delivered in 2010.
Otokar Cobra II		Turkey	70+	
Otokar APV		Turkey	200	
Titan D		Canada	Unknown	Used in active service.
Titan S		Canada	Unknown	Used in active service.
Marauder		South Africa; Azerbaijan	110	Produced in Azerbaijan with engines made in the United States.
Matador		South Africa; Azerbaijan	110	Produced in Azerbaijan with engines made in the United States.
İTX-6L		Azerbaijan	Unknown	used by special forces
Cougar		United States	4+	Used by peacekeeping forces.
Otokar Engerek		Turkey	Unknown	Bought from the Turkish Armed Forces surplus. Based on Land Rover Defender 110 with different variants such as Engerek anti-tank and AGS-17 models. Mostly used by ÇHD units.
Vaşaq		Azerbaijan		

== Military vehicles ==
Name	Manufacturer	Photo	Number	Notes
Mercedes-Benz G-Class	Austria; West Germany; Germany		120+	Used by state border service.
Tarpan Honker	Polish People's Republic; Poland		50+	Used by mine agencies.
Land Rover License Copy	Turkey		100+	Unknown amount in service. Fast attack variants spotted at 2020 military parade.
Land Rover Wolf	United Kingdom		200+	Military ambulance, used for medical first aid and transportation purposes.
Gürzə	Azerbaijan		30+	Patrol vehicle.
UAZ-3151	Soviet Union		150+	Used by Azerbaijani Land Forces.
Military trucks
Unimog	Germany; Turkey		50+	Acquired from Turkey, used for infantry transportation.
Mercedes-Benz Atego	Germany		150+	Used for infantry and arms-ammunitions transportation.
China National Heavy Duty Truck Group	China		100+	Vehicle hauler trailer, used for armoured vehicle transportation.
Kamaz	Russia		2.000+	Acquired from Russia, used for infantry transportation.
MAZ	Belarus		100+	Acquired from Belarus.
Ural-4320	Soviet Union; Russia		1.000+	Inherited from Soviet Union, additional quantities purchased from Russia and used for infantry transportation.
Ural-43206	Russia		400+	Used for infantry transportation.
Engineer fortifications
Revival Demining Vehicle	Azerbaijan			Demining vehicle produced by domestic company
Aardvark JSFU	United Kingdom		10	Mine flail
MEMATT	Turkey		20	Remote controlled demining vehicle.
BREM-1M	Russia		Unknown	Armoured repair and recovery vehicle built on the T-90 chassis. Obtained from Russia.
BTS-5B	Ukraine		18	Armoured repair and recovery vehicle. 4 purchased from Ukraine in 2007 and 14 in 2012.
IMR-2	Soviet Union		Unknown	Engineering vehicle built on the T-72 chassis.
IMR-3M	Russia		Unknown	Acquired from Russia.
MTU-90	Russia		Unknown	Tracked armored bridgelayer, acquired from Russia.
TMM-6 Bridgelayer	Soviet Union		Unknown	Based on wheeled heavyweight vehicle MZKT-7930. Acquired from Russia.

== Artillery ==
=== Howitzers and field guns ===
Name	Image	Origin	Number	Notes
Towed Artillery
85mm D-44		Soviet Union	~100	[Range: 15.6 km].
122mm D-30		Soviet Union	~423	[Range: 15.4 km or 21.9 km when using RAPs].
130mm M-46		Soviet Union	36	[Range: 27.5 km or 38 km when using RAPs].
152mm Giatsint-B		Soviet Union	49	[Range: 15.2 km or 21.9 km when using RAPs].
152mm D-20		Soviet Union	43	
Self-Propelled Artillery
155 mm L-45 DİTA		Czechoslovakia	72 on order	Maximum range 50 km
155 mm Nora B-52		Serbia	48 on order	Maximum range 52 km
155mm ATMOS 2000		Israel	6	
152mm SpGH DANA		Czechoslovakia	36	[Range: 20 km].
152mm 2S19 Msta		Russia	18	[Range: 25 km or 28.9 km when using RAPs].
203mm 2S7 Pion		Soviet Union	15	[Range: 37.5 km or 55.5 km when using RAPs].
Multiple launch rocket systems
PULS		Israel	75+	They were newly brought to Azerbaijan and displayed at the 2025 Victory Parade. They are equipped with the Accural Sky Striker Block 4 and the Predator Hawk.
306mm Extra		Israel	30	[Range: 150 km], [CEP: 10m].
122mm LAR-160		Israel	30	
160mm LYNX		Israel	30	
302mm TRG-300 Kasirga		Turkey	36	[Range: 120 km], [CEP: 10m].
122mm T-122 'Sakarya'		Turkey	44	[Range: 40 km].
230mm TRLG-230		Turkey	20+	[Range: 70 km], [CEP: 2m]
107mm TR-107 Boran		Azerbaijan; Turkey	100+	[Range: 11 km].
107mm MRLS-107		Azerbaijan; Turkey	100+	[Range: 11 km].
220mm TOS-1A		Russia	36	[Range: 6 km].
300mm BM-30 'Smerch'		Russia	50	20 were purchased from Ukraine and 30 from Russia.
122mm RM-70		Czechoslovakia	30	[Range: 40 km].
301mm Polonez		People's Republic of China; Belarus	10	[Range: 200 km], [CEP: 30m].
122mm KRL 122		Pakistan	55	[Range: 40 km].
128mm RAK-12		Croatia	10	[Range: 13 km].
122mm BM-21 'Grad'		Soviet Union	140+	BM-21 and BM-21V [Range: 40 km].
Cruise Missile
SOM-B1		Turkey	unknown	Used by Su-25ML and Akinci
Sea Breaker		Israel	unknown	Operational range:300 km
Ballistic Missile
Predator Hawk		Israel	unknown	
LORA		Israel	4	[Range: 430 km], [CEP: 10m].
Mortars
120mm Spear Mk2		Israel	47	Used with SandCat [Range: 10 km].
120mm Cardom		Israel	50	[Range: 8 km].
120mm 2S31 Vena		Russia	18	[Range: 18 km].
2S9 Nona		Soviet Union	18	
Komando 20N6MT		Azerbaijan	400	
20N5		Azerbaijan	280	
2B14 Podnos		Soviet Union	400	
2B11		Soviet Union	600	
2S12		Soviet Union	180	
M1938 mortar		Soviet Union	27	
RM-38		Soviet Union	107	

== Air defense ==
Name	Manufacturer	Photo	Number	Notes
Barak 8	Israel		18+	
Spyder	Israel		Unknown	
S-300PMU-2	Russia		24	
Pantsir	Russia		10+	Approved by the Ministry of Defense of Azerbaijan
Buk-MB	Russia		18+	
Tor-M2U	Russia		20+	
Vikinq	Azerbaijan		?	
HQ-9	China		Unknown quantity	
FireForce	Azerbaijan			
Buk-Mb2k	Belarus		10+	
Osa-1t	Belarus; Azerbaijan		90+	
S-125	Belarus		54	
9K35 Strela	Soviet Union		60+	
ZSU-23-4 Shilka	Soviet Union		50+	
MANPADS
9K32 Strela-2	Soviet Union			
9K34 Strela-3	Soviet Union			
9K310 Igla-1	Soviet Union			
9K338 Igla-S	Russia			1000 missiles and 200 launchers delivered between 2012-2013.

== Target acquisition systems and Thermal/IR optic observation systems ==
Name	Manufacturer	Photo	Number	Notes
GonioLight VT-I	Switzerland		Unknown	
Matis HH	France		Unknown	
Şahin Gözü	Turkey		Unknown	
Dragoneye	Turkey		Unknown	The DRAGONEYE system is an electro-optical sensor system in which the following units are integrated: Thermal camera; Laser Range Finder; Day Camera; GPS Receiver; Digital Magnetic Compass
Dörtgöz thermal camera	Turkey		Unknown	DÖRTGÖZ is a 3rd generation thermal imaging system with today's most modern technology, developed for the detection, identification and diagnosis of threats from a distance
DAS- DISTRIBUTED OPTICAL Aperture CAMERA SYSTEM	Turkey		Unknown	DAS- DISTRIBUTED OPTICAL Aperture CAMERA SYSTEM is a situational awareness system that offers 360° continuous surveillance with integrated thermal and daytime cameras
ASIR IR reconnaissance camera	Turkey		Unknown	ASIR is a thermal imaging device with a 288x4 Focal Plane Index Detector that detects in the Far Infrared band, and it enables the detection of threatening elements easily in both day and night conditions
Göz SeeSpot	Turkey		Unknown	EYE-SeeSpot (EYE-SS) Thermal Camera is used for detection, diagnosis and identification of threats; It is a thermal camera that provides high performance in all weather conditions day and night
ADLR LRF	Turkey		Unknown	ADLR Laser Range Finder is a high performance laser range finder designed for use in air defense systems.

== Radar and field communication systems ==
Name	Manufacturer	Photo	Number	Notes
Ground radar systems
EL/M-2080 Green Pine	Israel		Unknown	
EL/M-2084	Israel		Unknown	
EL/M-2238 STAR	Israel		Unknown	
Ground-based air surveillance radar systems
Lanza-LTR	Spain		Unknown	
Lanza-MRR	Spain		Unknown	
Field mobile radio and satellite communication systems
TASMUS	Turkey		60	Total 60 unit entered into service AZRA-1 AZRA-2 in project of scope

== Reserve Equipment ==
Name	Image	Origin	Number	Notes
Tanks
T-55		Soviet Union	155	Bought from Ukraine between 1993-1994. Modernized version of T-55s were used as an artillery during the 2nd Karabakh War.
Armoured reconnaissance vehicle
BRM-1K		Soviet Union	21+	
Infantry Fighting Vehicles
BMD-1		Soviet Union	41	Not currently active
Armored personnel carrier
BTR-60		Soviet Union	35	More in storage.
BTR-D		Soviet Union	11	

=== Artillery ===
Name	Photo	Origin	Number	Notes
Self-propelled artillery
152mm 2S3 Akatsiya		Soviet Union	22+	The latest was presented at the Victory Parade on November 8, 2025. It will be replaced by the 155mm Dita and Nora-B52
122mm 2S1 Gvozdika		Soviet Union	70+	The latest was presented at the Victory Parade on November 8, 2025. It will be replaced by the 155mm Dita and Nora-B52.
Multiple launch rocket systems
220mm BM-27 'Uragan'		Soviet Union	18	Purchased from Ukraine
Ballistic missile systems
OTR-21 Tochka-U		Soviet Union	4	It was taken out of service and was in reserve storage.
Air defense
S-200	Soviet Union		24	
S-75	Soviet Union		10+	
