= Browning Hi-Power =

American-Belgian semi-automatic pistol

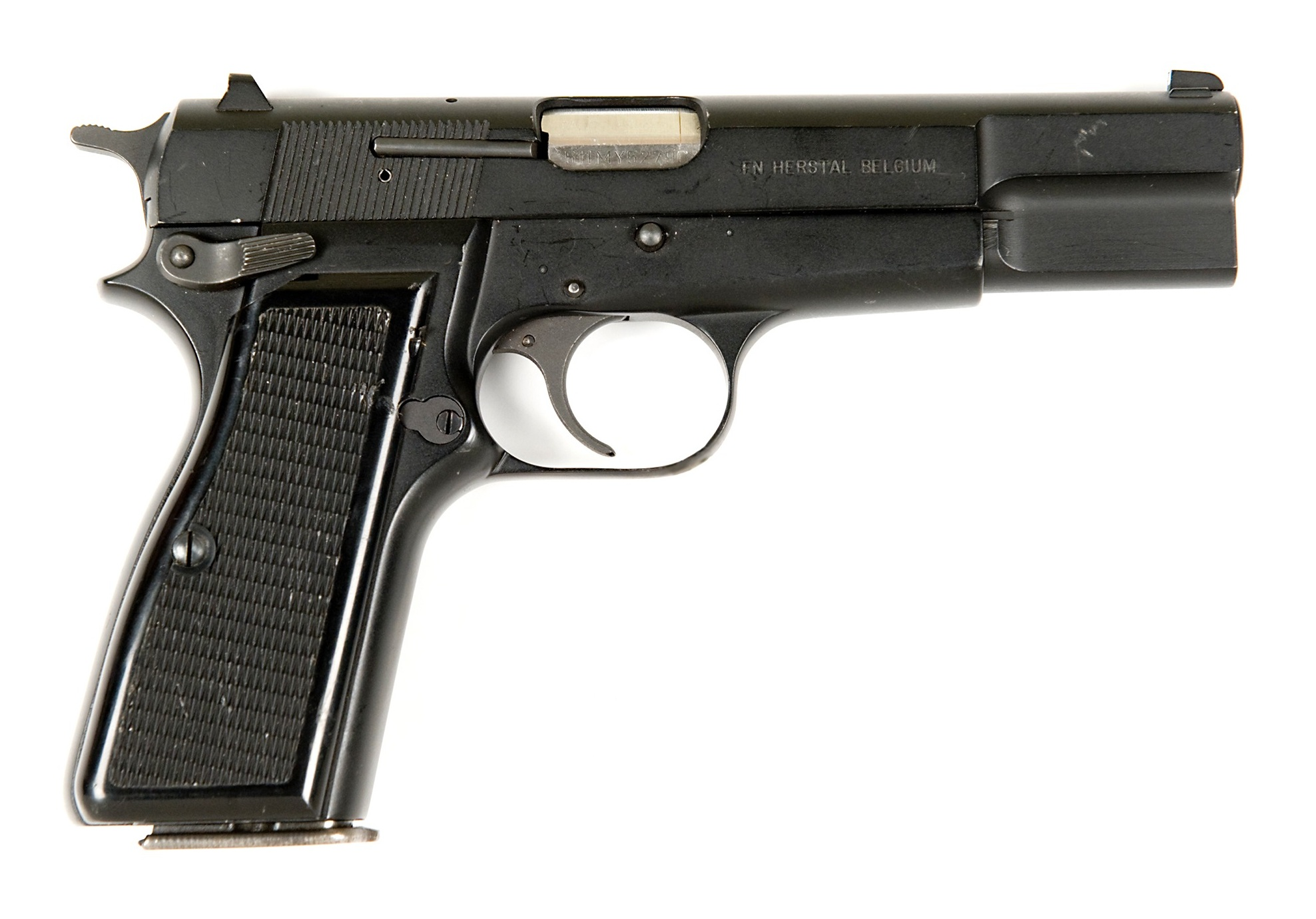
- Fabrique Nationale Browning Hi-Power Mark III
- Type: Semi-automatic pistol
- Place of origin: Belgium; United States

Service history
- In service: 1935–present
- Used by: See Users
- Wars: World War II; Indonesian National Revolution; 1948 Palestine war; Chinese Civil War; Korean War; First Indochina War; Algerian War; Vietnam War; Cambodian Civil War; Rhodesian Bush War; South African Border War; Falklands War; The Troubles; Lebanese Civil War; Salvadoran Civil War; Sri Lankan Civil War; Tuareg rebellion (1990–1995); Yugoslav Wars; Kivu Conflict; Israeli–Palestinian conflict; Libyan Crisis; Syrian Civil War

Production history
- Designer: John Browning; Dieudonné Saive
- Designed: 1914–1935
- Manufacturer: FN Herstal; Browning Arms Company; Fabricaciones Militares; John Inglis and Company
- Produced: 1935-2018; 2022–present
- No. built: 1,500,000+
- Variants: See Variants

Specifications
- Mass: 915 g (32 oz)
- Length: 199 mm (7.8 in)
- Barrel length: 118 mm (4.65 in)
- Height: 127.5 mm (5.01 in)
- Cartridge: 7.65×21mm Parabellum; 9×19mm Parabellum; .40 S&W
- Action: Short recoil operated tilting barrel
- Rate of fire: Semi-automatic
- Muzzle velocity: 335 m/s(1,100 ft/s) (9mm)
- Effective firing range: 50 m (54.7 yd)
- Feed system: Detachable box magazine: 10, 13, 15 or 17 rounds (9mm); 20 or 30 rounds made by Rhodesia (9mm); 10 rounds (.40 S&W)

The Browning Hi-Power or 1935 Browning 9mm GP or Grand Puissance pistol is a single-action, semi-automatic pistol available in the 9×19mm Parabellum and .40 S&W calibers. It was based on a design by American firearms inventor John Browning, and completed by Dieudonné Saive at FN Herstal. Browning died in 1926, several years before the design was finalized. FN Herstal named it the "High Power" in allusion to the 13-round magazine capacity, almost twice that of other designs at the time, such as the Walther P38 or Colt M1911. The Hi-Power was the only 9mm semi-automatic pistol available with a double-stack detachable box magazine from 1935 until the introduction of the 15-round MAB PA-15 in 1966.

During World War II, Belgium was occupied by Nazi Germany and the FN factory was used by the Wehrmacht to build the pistols for their military, under the designation "9mm Pistole 640(b)". FN Herstal continued to build guns for the Allied forces by moving their production line to a John Inglis and Company plant in Canada, where the name was changed to "Hi-Power". The name change was kept even after production returned to Belgium. The pistol is often referred to as an HP or BHP, and the terms P-35 and HP-35 are also used, based on the introduction of the pistol in 1935. Other names include GP (after the French term grande puissance) or BAP (Browning Automatic Pistol). The Hi-Power is one of the most widely used military pistols in history, having been used by the armed forces of over 50 countries. Although most pistols were built in Belgium by FN Herstal, licensed and unlicensed copies were built around the world, in countries such as Argentina, Hungary, India, Bulgaria, and Israel.

After 82 years of continuous production, FN Herstal announced that the production of the Hi-Power would end, and it was discontinued in early 2018 by Browning Arms. From 2019 to 2022, with new Belgian Hi-Powers no longer being built, new clones were designed by various firearm companies to fill the void, including GİRSAN, TİSAŞ, and Springfield Armory, Inc. These new Hi-Power clones began competing with each other by offering new finishes, enhanced sights, redesigned hammers, bevelled magazine wells, improved trigger, and increased magazine capacity.

In 2022, FN announced they would resume production of the Browning Hi-Power. The 2022 "FN High Power" incorporated a number of entirely new features such as a fully ambidextrous slide lock, simplified takedown method, enlarged ejection port, reversible magazine release, wider slide serrations, different colored finish offerings, and 17-round magazines. In contrast to popular belief, the new FN High Power might resemble a modern Hi-Power, but it is, in fact, a different design. One of the noticeable details is the lack of Browning-style locking lugs.

== History ==
=== Development ===
The Browning Hi-Power was designed in response to a French military requirement for a new service pistol in the name of “GP” (French: Grand Rendement, lit. 'High efficiency'; French: Grande Puissance, lit. 'High Power').

The French military required that:

- The gun must be compact
- The magazine have a capacity of at least 10 rounds
- The gun have a magazine disconnect device, an external hammer, and safety catch
- The gun be robust and simple to disassemble and reassemble
- The gun be capable of killing a man at 50 m (55 yd)

This last criterion was seen to demand a caliber of 9 mm (0.35 in) or larger, a bullet mass of around 8 g (120 gr), and a muzzle velocity of 350 m/s (1,100 ft/s). It was to accomplish all of this at a weight not exceeding 1 kg (2.2 lb).

FN commissioned John Browning to design a new military sidearm conforming to this specification. Browning had previously sold the rights to his successful M1911 U.S. Army automatic pistol to Colt's Patent Firearms, and was therefore forced to design an entirely new pistol while working around the M1911 patents. Browning built two different prototypes for the project in Utah and filed the patent for this pistol in the United States on 28 June 1923, granted on 22 February 1927. One was a simple blowback design, while the other was operated with a locked-breech recoil system. Both prototypes utilised the new staggered magazine design (by designer Dieudonné Saive) to increase capacity without unduly increasing the pistol's grip size or magazine length.

The locked breech design was selected for further development and testing. This model was striker-fired, and featured a double-stack magazine that held 16 rounds. The design was refined through several trials held by the Versailles Trial Commission.

In 1928, when the patents for the Colt Model 1911 had expired, Dieudonné Saive integrated many of the Colt's previously patented features into the Saive-Browning Model of that same year. This version featured the removable barrel bushing and take down sequence of the Colt 1911.

In 1929, as an effort to find an alternative solution to the long-ongoing French trials, and with a pistol that they considered by then to be good enough to stand on its own to find other potential clients, FN decided to announce the "Grand Rendement", incorporating a shortened 13-round magazine, for sale in their commercial catalogue. They hoped to find a military contract which would in turn help them finance a production line, essentially through the same process as their previous FN M1900 pistol.

By 1931, the Browning Hi-Power design incorporated the same 13-round magazine, a curved rear grip strap, and a barrel bushing that was integral to the slide assembly. The Belgian Army showed a definite interest and bought 1,000 pistols based on this prototype for field trials.

By 1934, the Hi-Power design was complete and ready to be produced. Ultimately, France decided not to adopt the pistol, instead selecting the conceptually similar but lower-capacity Modèle 1935 pistol. However, it was good enough to stand on its own as a service pistol for the Belgian Army and other clients. These would become the Grande Puissance, known as the High Power, in Belgium for military service in 1935 as the Browning P-35.

=== Military service and widespread use ===
Browning Hi-Power pistols were used during World War II by both Allied and Axis forces. After occupying Belgium in 1940, German forces took over the FN plant. German troops subsequently used the Hi-Power, having assigned it the designation Pistole 640(b) ("b" for belgisch, "Belgian"). Examples produced by FN in Belgium under German occupation bear German inspection and acceptance marks, or Waffenamts, such as WaA613. In German service, it was used mainly by Waffen-SS and Fallschirmjäger personnel.

High-Power pistols were also produced in Canada for Allied use, by John Inglis and Company in Toronto. The plans were sent from the FN factory to the UK when it became clear the Belgian plant would fall into German hands, enabling the Inglis factory to be tooled up for Hi-Power production for Allied use. Inglis produced two versions of the Hi-Power, one with an adjustable rear sight and detachable shoulder stock (primarily for a Nationalist Chinese contract) and one with a fixed rear sight. Production began in late 1944 and they were on issue by the March 1945 Operation Varsity airborne crossing of the Rhine into Germany. The pistol was popular with the British airborne forces as well as covert operations and commando groups such as the Special Operations Executive (SOE), the U.S. Office of Strategic Services (OSS), and the British Special Air Service (SAS) Regiment.

Inglis High-Powers made for Commonwealth forces have the British designation 'Mk 1' or 'Mk 1*' and the manufacturer's details on the left of the slide. They were known in British and Commonwealth service as the 'Pistol No 2 Mk 1', or 'Pistol No 2 Mk 1*' where applicable. Serial numbers were 6 characters, the second being the letter 'T', e.g. 1T2345. Serial numbers on pistols for the Chinese contract instead used the letters 'CH', but otherwise followed the same format. When the Chinese contract was cancelled, all undelivered Chinese-style pistols were accepted by the Canadian military with designations of 'Pistol No 1 Mk 1' and 'Pistol No 1 Mk 1*'.

In the postwar period, Hi-Power production continued at the FN factory and as part of FN's product range, which included the FN FAL rifle and FN MAG general-purpose machine gun. It has been adopted as the standard service pistol by over 50 armies in 93 countries. At one time most NATO nations used it, and it was standard issue to forces throughout the British Commonwealth. It was manufactured under licence, or in some cases cloned, on several continents. Former Iraqi ruler Saddam Hussein often carried a Browning Hi-Power. Former Libyan ruler Muammar Gaddafi carried a gold-plated Hi-Power with his own face design on the left side of the grip which was waved around in the air by Libyan rebels after his death. A Hi-Power was used by Mehmet Ali Agca during the assassination attempt of Pope John Paul II in 1981.

=== Decline and resurgence ===
The Hi-Power has proven to be a design of substantial longevity, and it remains in service as the standard sidearm of the Indian Army, the Indonesian Armed Forces, the Suriname National Army, and the Argentine Army.

However, since the late 1970s, its ubiquity has been increasingly threatened by the introduction of more modern designs. This new generation of pistols, referred to as Wonder Nines, feature double action triggers, and are manufactured with more modern materials such as aluminum or polymer, resulting in a lower overall weight.

Attempting to capitalize on this trend, FN released the HP-DA pistol in 1983. Though similar in appearance, the HP-DA features significant design and ergonomics changes from the standard, single-action Hi-Power. FN Herstal presented the HP-DA at the United States Joint Service Small Arms Program’s XM9 pistol trials of 1983-84. However, the pistol was voluntarily withdrawn from consideration, and the Beretta 92F was ultimately picked as the next American service weapon. The Finnish Defence Forces accepted the HP-DA as their standard service pistol under the designations 9.00 PIST 80 and 9.00 PIST 80–91. It has been supplanted in service by the Glock 17, Walther P99, and Sig Sauer P226.

In 2006, the Irish Defence Forces announced that it would be replacing its inventory of Hi-Power pistols with the Heckler & Koch USP in 9mm. This replacement began the following year.

In 2013, the Belgian Armed Forces, which had adopted the Hi-Power in 1935, replaced their remaining stock with the Five-seveN pistol, also made by Fabrique National.

In 2013 the British Armed Forces began to replace the Browning with the Glock 17 Gen 4 pistol, due to concerns about weight and the external safety of the pistol.

In 2024, the Canadian Armed Forces began phasing out their Hi-Powers to be replaced with the Sig Sauer P320.

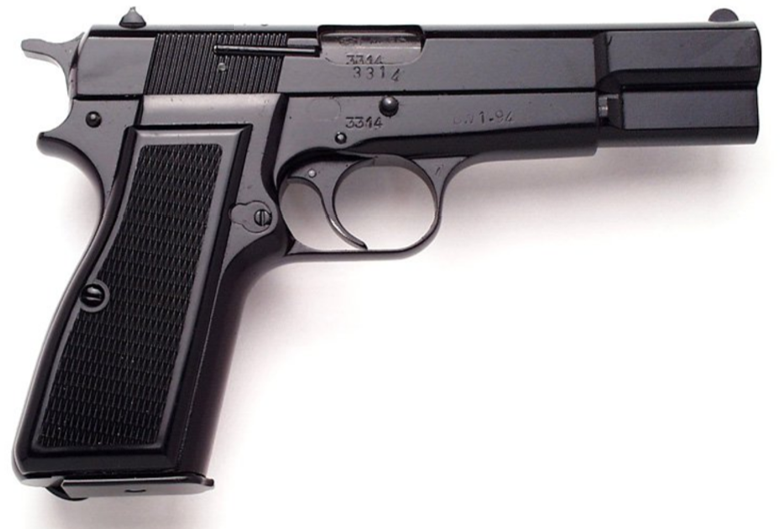
FN Hi-Power M46 used by the Armed Forces of the Netherlands until 1994

In 2018, FN announced they would end production of the Mark III Hi-Power, citing increasing production costs. Early in that year, FN officially ceased production of the Belgian Hi-Power for the first time since 1935.

Since the discontinuation of the Hi-Power, several companies begun producing clones for intended for the civilian market. This includes Turkish manufactures TİSAŞ and GİRSAN, as well as American gun company Springfield Armory, who released their clone, the SA-35, in 2021

In 2022, FN Herstal announced the FN High Power series of pistols. This pistol, marketed as a modernized version of the classic Hi-Power, is in actuality an entirely new design that features no parts in common with its predecessor. The High Power features several new design features not included in the original Hi-Power. The most significant changes include opening up the top of the slide to increase the size of the ejection port to ensure reliable feeding and ejection, incorporating an ambidextrous slide lock and reversible magazine release, a completely different takedown process, and a redesign of the barrel and recoil spring. Other changes FN made include removing the magazine disconnect safety, adding an extended beavertail and redesigning hammer to eliminate the issue of hammer bite, several sets of redesigned grips, new sights compatible with the FN 509 dovetail pattern, wider slide serrations, different colored PVD or stainless steel finish offerings and 17-round magazines. The new FN High Powers are made at FN's Columbia, South Carolina factory in the United States.

=== Design flaws ===
The pistol has a tendency to "bite" the web of the shooter's hand, between the thumb and forefinger. This bite is caused by pressure from the hammer spur, or alternatively by pinching between the hammer shank and grip tang. This problem can be fixed by altering or replacing the hammer, or by learning to hold the pistol to avoid injury. While a common complaint with the commercial models with spur hammers similar to that of the Colt "Government Model" automatic, it is seldom a problem with the military models, which have a smaller, rounded "burr" hammer, more like that of the Colt "Commander" compact version of the 1911.

Another flaw is that the original small safety is very hard to release and re-engage. This is because when cocked, the shaft the safety turns on is under hammer spring pressure. Later versions had a larger safety to address this issue.

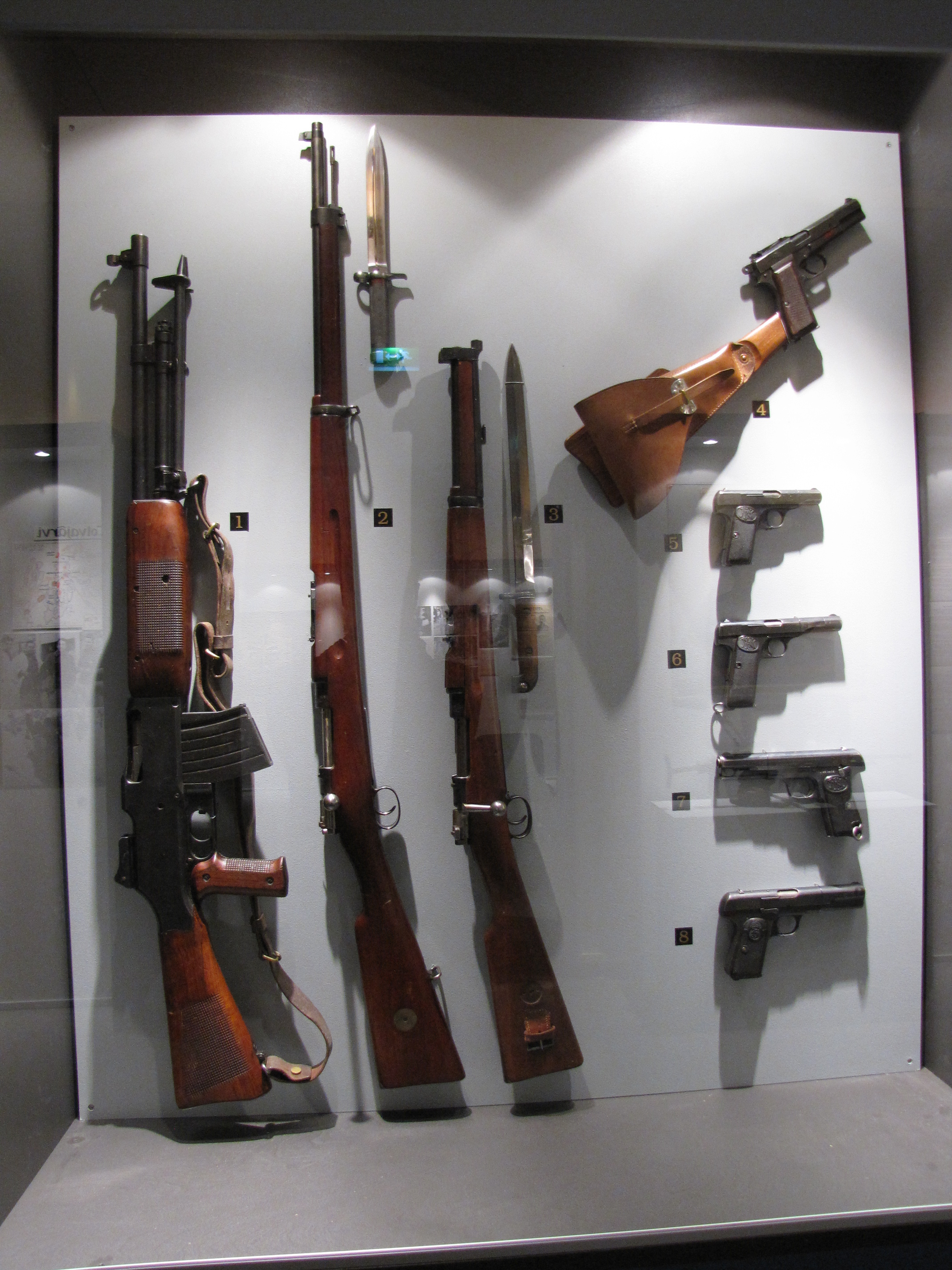
Hi-Power artillery version with its adjustable tangent rear-sight and shoulder-stock in the upper right-hand corner

== Variants ==
=== Belgium ===
==== P35 ====
The original P35, as noted earlier, featured an internal extractor. During World War II, it was manufactured by Inglis of Canada for Allied use, and by FN in occupied Belgium for German use. The P35s made under Nazi occupation were designated as the Pistole 640b. Most Canadian P35s were manufactured with a Parkerized finish, while most P35s manufactured in occupied Belgium had a blued finish.

Following the end of the World War II, the Hi-Power went through several iterations in an effort to standardize and streamline the manufacturing process. The most significant of which was released in 1962, when the internal extractor was replaced with a more durable and reliable external design, alongside other modifications, including a 2-piece barrel, nylon grips, and modifications to the locking system for simplification of manufacturing and improved durability. Later barrels and frames are not interchangeable with earlier ones.

Working on these changes, FN manufactured a new standard Hi-Power from 1963 to 1969. These are retroactively referred to as the T-Series, from the letter T serial number prefix found on pistols of this era. This design standard continued into the similarly named C-Series, produced from 1969 to 1975.

Further iteration happened in the early 1970s. The Hi-Power model of 1972 features several new modifications, including a spurred hammer to replace the previous ring design, a new electrolyte bluing process in lieu of the older rust and salt bluing techniques, and the provision for a rear adjustable target sight with raised front sight. Available simultaneously with the adjustable sight model were two ‘standard’ versions;

- The Vigilante featuring traditional fixed sights,
- The Captain, equipped with a rear tangent sight.

The early 1970s is also when Hi-Power first became available in the 7.65×21mm Parabellum caliber. Released for markets such as France and Germany, where the civilian use of military calibers was restricted.

In 1973, due to rising labor costs in Belgium, production of the Hi-Power was partially moved to Viana do Castelo, Portugal. FN would still continue to produce parts in Belgium, but finishing and assembly would henceforth be completed in Viana do Castelo.

=== Mark II ===
The Mark II, released in 1982, was the next significant iteration of the Hi-Power series of pistols.

Designed in response to some of the long enduring criticisms of the Hi-Power design, the Mark II features several upgrades, including ambidextrous thumb safety, 3-dot low profile sights, and a throated barrel.

The Mark II can be easily recognized by the rib atop the slide, as well as the water drain hole below the muzzle.

=== Mark III ===
The Mark III was another advancement over the Mark II released in 1989, which featured a firing pin safety, adjustable front and rear iron sights, and a black epoxy finish.

The Mark III is the first Hi-Power variant available in .40 S&W. Early variants of the Mark III featured forged frames, as was the standard for all Hi-Powers, while later Mark III’s switched to a cast frame.

This change was prompted by reports of failure in pistols chambered for the then new .40 S&W cartridge. Cast frames were used on all Hi-Power variants from the early 1990s to their discontinuation in 2018.

==== Standard ====
The name given to the Mark III variant with walnut grips, gloss finish, and choice of sights. A Standard is a Mark III model, but a Mark III is not necessarily a Standard.

==== Silver Chrome ====
Featured a silver-chrome frame and slide, and Pachmayr rubber grips. The magazines for the silver chrome BHP had a dull finish and a black rubber Pachmayr basepad.

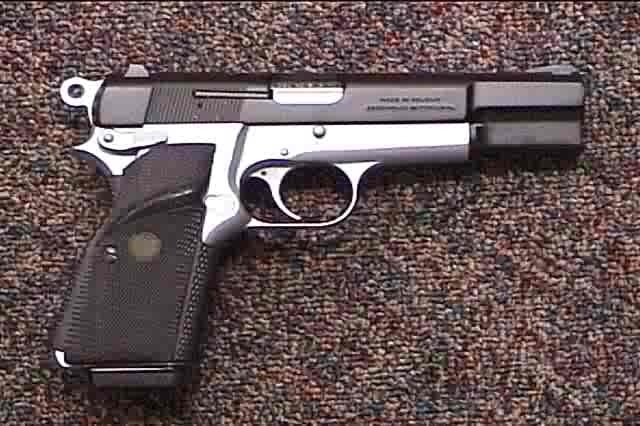
Browning Hi-Power Practical in .40 S&W

==== Captain ====
Mark III variant that features adjustable tangent rear sights, a "ring hammer" like the early model HP35, checkered walnut grips, and a blued finish. It was reintroduced in 1993.

==== Practical ====
Mark III variant featuring a slide finished in black polymer with a contrasting silver-chrome frame. In addition, this model has wraparound Pachmayr rubber grips and a "ring hammer".

The Practical has fixed or adjustable sights, and is available in either 9×19mm Parabellum or .40 S&W. Magazines for all Practical models sport Pachmayr base pads; magazines feature a cartridge capacity of 13 rounds in 9×19mm Parabellum and a cartridge capacity of 10 rounds in .40 S&W.

==== HP-SFS ====
The SFS (Safe-Fast-Shooting) is the latest Hi-Power Mark III variant with a modified firing mechanism. After the weapon is loaded, the hammer is pushed forward, which automatically activates the safety catch. When the shooter is prepared to fire, the safety is pressed down with the thumb, releasing the hammer to spring backwards into the usual, single-action position. A similar system is available for modifying Colt M1911A1s. Magazines are interchangeable with the Mark III and others.

=== Foreign production ===
==== Argentina ====
Manufactured by Fabricaciones Militares under license as the FM Hi-Power.

The Rosario, FM90, and FM95 models are manufactured by FM. The Rosario is an almost exact copy of the Mark II intended for Argentine and Latin American sales. The FM90 was an export model based on the Mark II, but with a "Colt style" slide without the characteristic bevelled front end, first made in 1990. Rubberized pistol grips (similar to the Pachmayr grips used for P35s) with finger grooves were used in place of the traditional slab side wood grips. The FM95 was the current export model (until 2002) based on the Mark III, also with the "Colt style" slide. The last models, until 2010, are the M02 AR (modernised version of the M95, with a new single-action system by Fabrique nationale) and the M03 AR (not dated 2003, as it would seem, actually a .40 S&W version of M02 AR) with their Detective versions.

The Detective is a short-slide HP produced by FM. The Detective slide group was also available without the frame, and is interchangeable with other FM and FN Hi-Power P35s.

==== Bulgaria ====
The Arcus 94 is a single-action semi-automatic pistol manufactured by Arcus as an unlicensed clone. There is a compact version, the Arcus 94C. It has been succeeded in production by the double-action Arcus 98DA.

==== Israel ====
The Kareen was made by KSN Industries.

- Mark I variant is made with FEG parts, based on the Hi-Power.
- Mark II variant made with larger, squared trigger and ambidextrous thumb safeties.
- Mark III variant made with hogue pistol grips, dovetailed front sight and parkerized slide with serration cuts.

==== Indonesia ====
Pindad made a licensed version of the High-Power known as the P1. Production reportedly started in the 1960s.

==== Nigeria ====
Hi-Powers were made under license by the Defence Industries Corporation of Nigeria

==== Philippines ====
Unlicensed clones made in various workshops.

==== Turkey ====
TİSAŞ made the ZIG 14 and the Regent BR9. Alpharms Savunma Sanayi made the Centurion 14. Özerbaş Makina manufactures the P-35 and GP-35 for SDS Imports.

GIRSAN makes the MC P35, released in 2021 and imported into the US by European American Armory Corp (EAA).

==== United States ====
Charles Daly firearms marketed the Charles Daly HP. The first HPs were shipped by CD in 2003. These are based on FEG-made clones.

On 25 October 2021, Springfield Armory launched a reproduction of the Hi-Power called the SA-35. It has the features of the original Hi-Power, but has a capacity of 15 rounds while the pistol can handle +P 9 mm Luger loads.

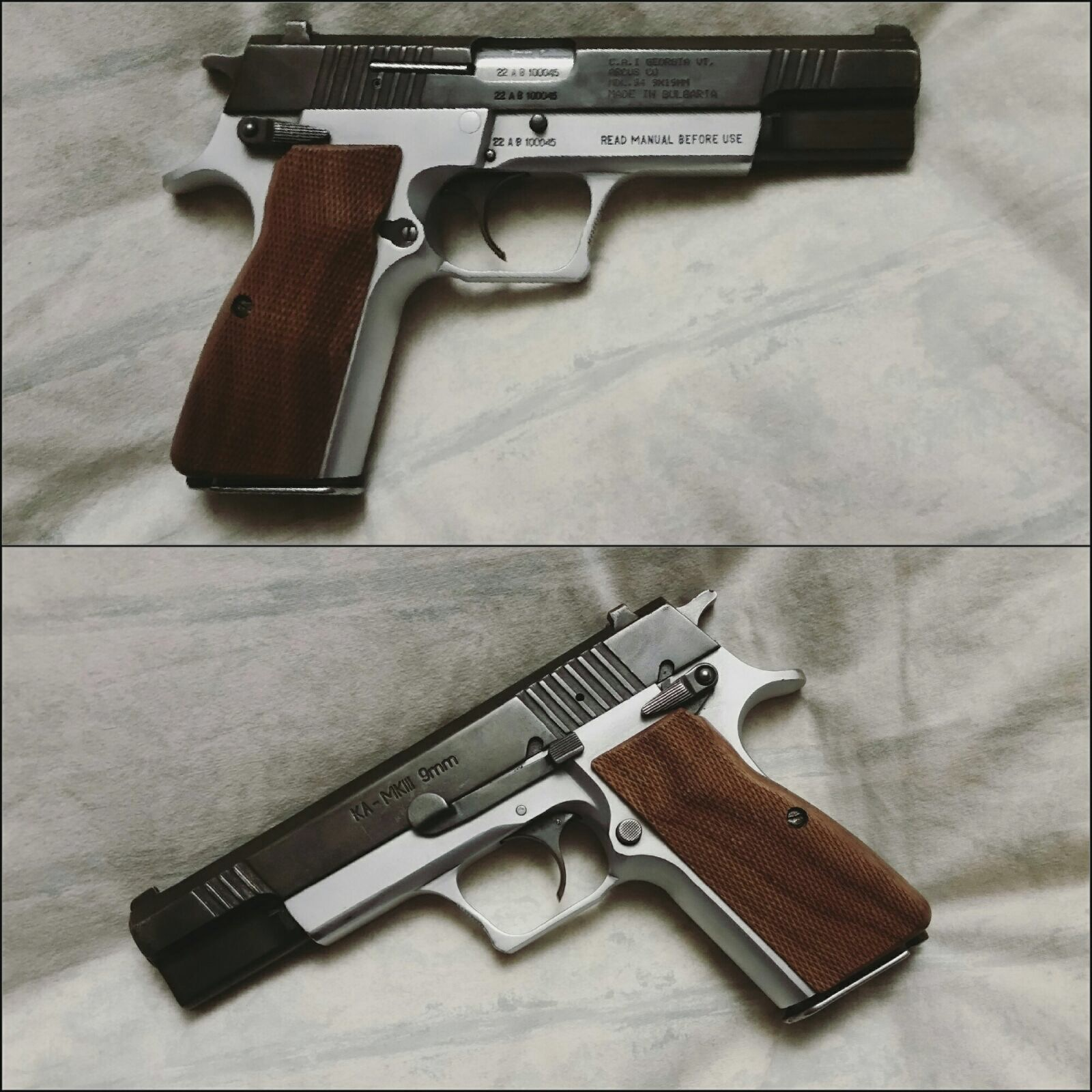
A Century International Arms-imported Arcus 94

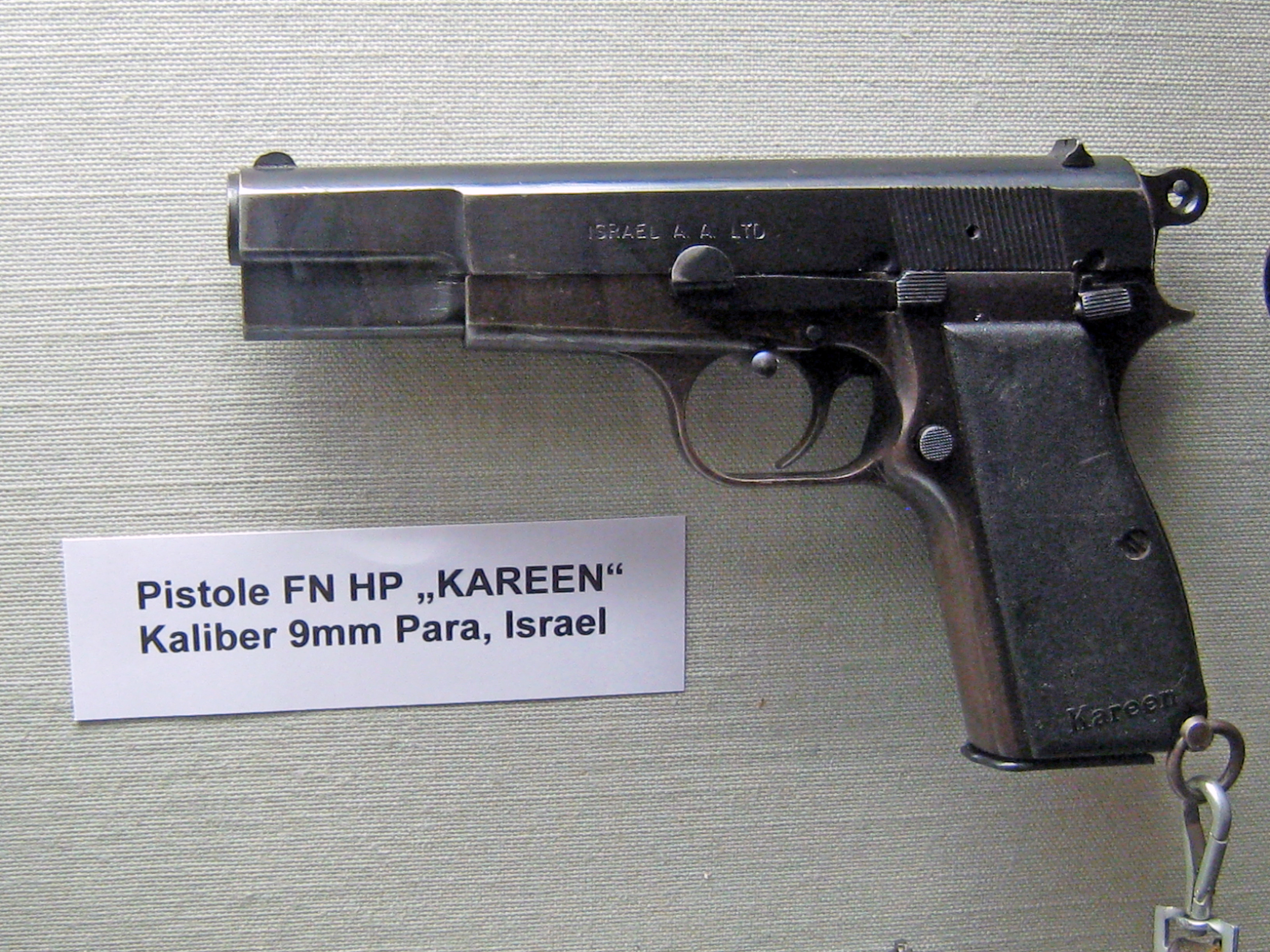
Kareen Mark I

== Users ==
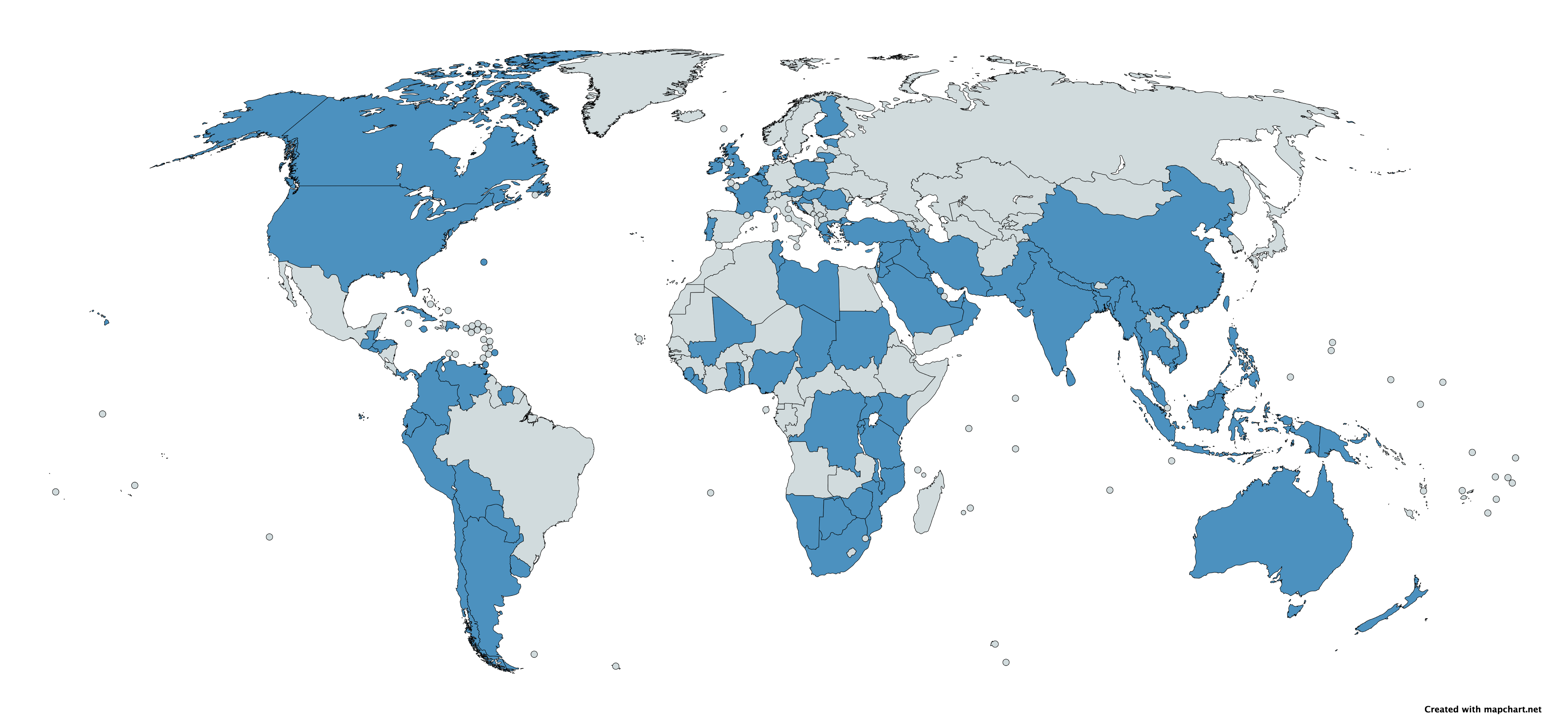
A map with Browning Hi-Power users in blue

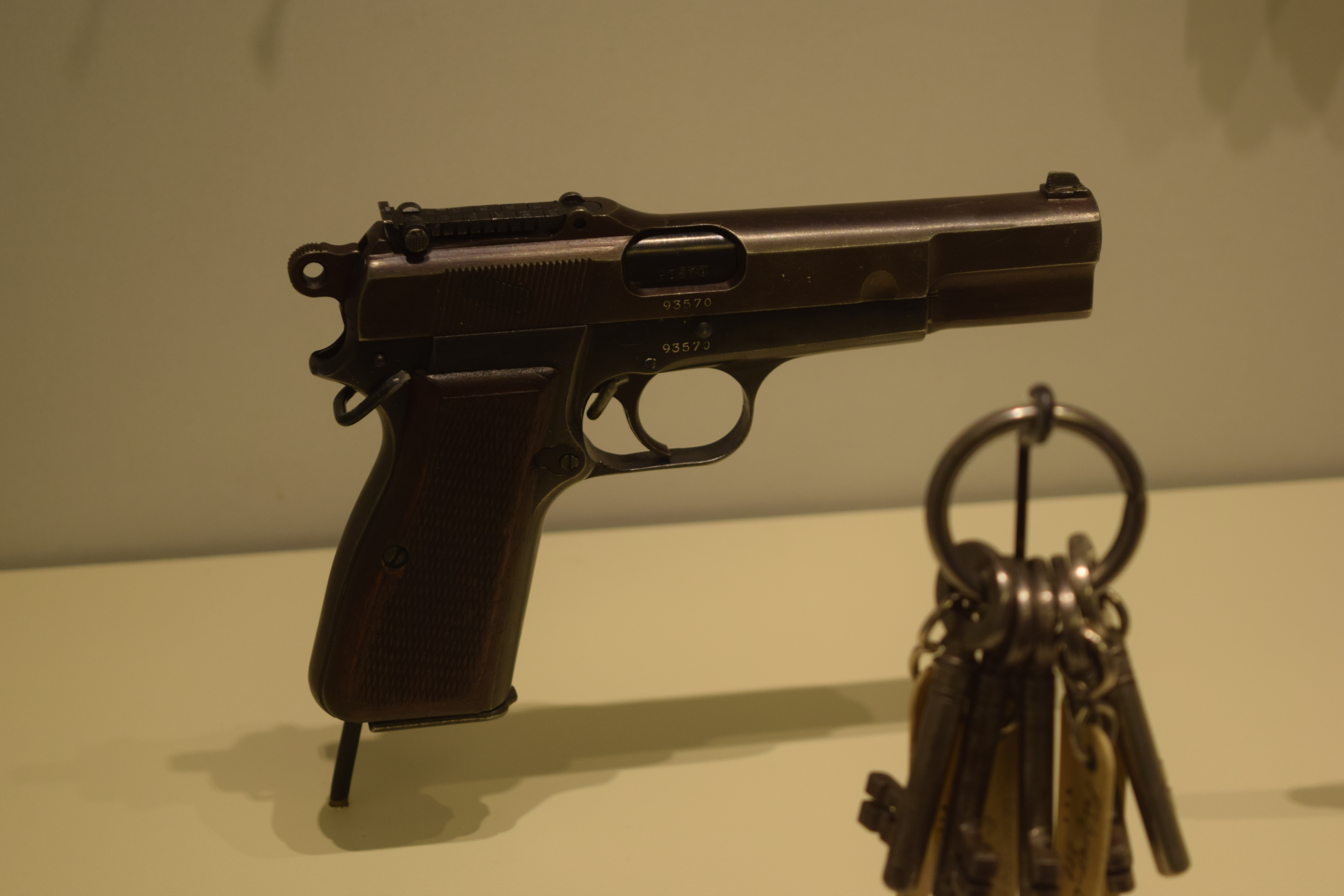
Browning Hi-Power made in 1961

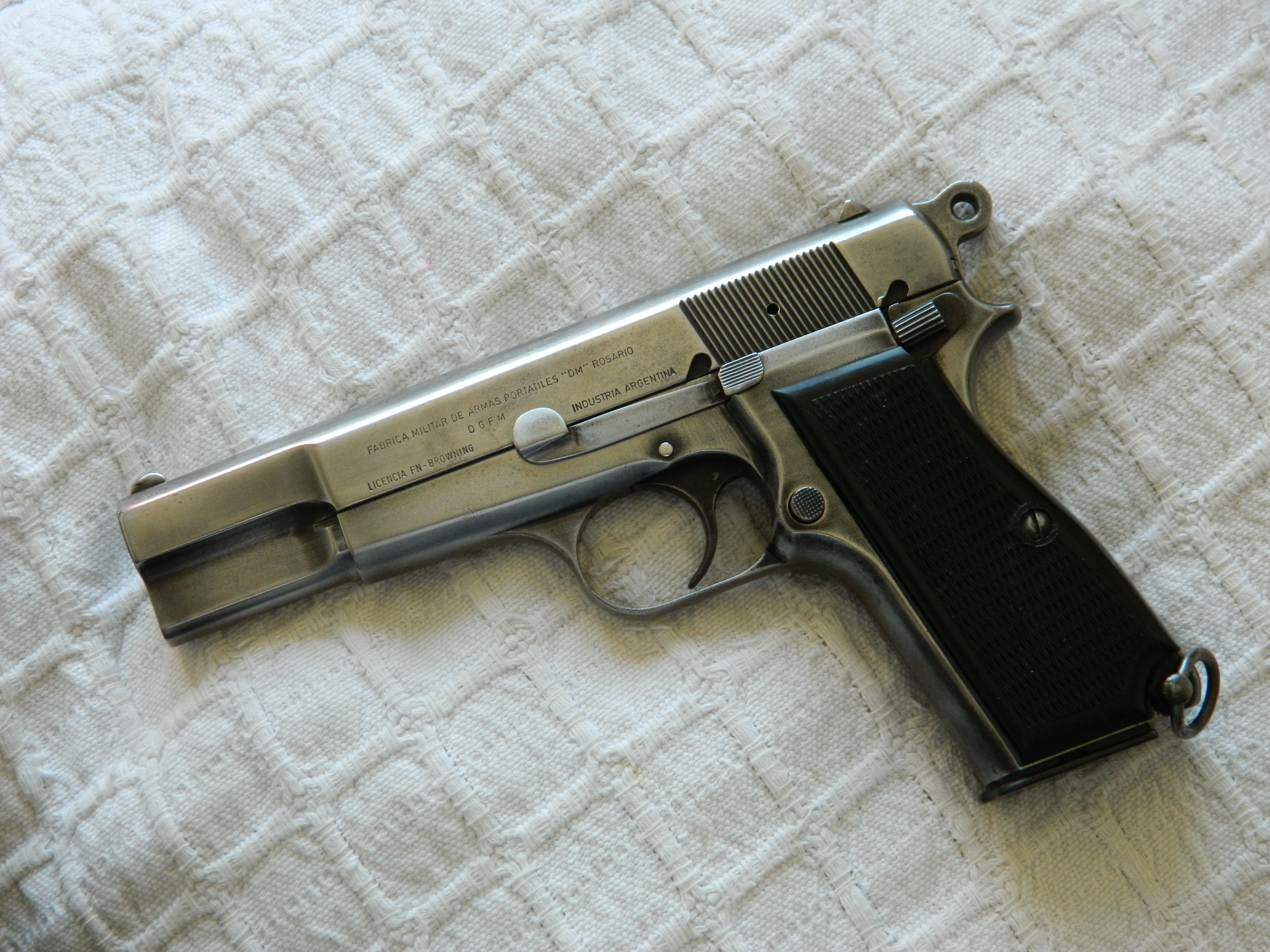
A worn Browning Hi-Power, made in Argentina in the mid-1970s

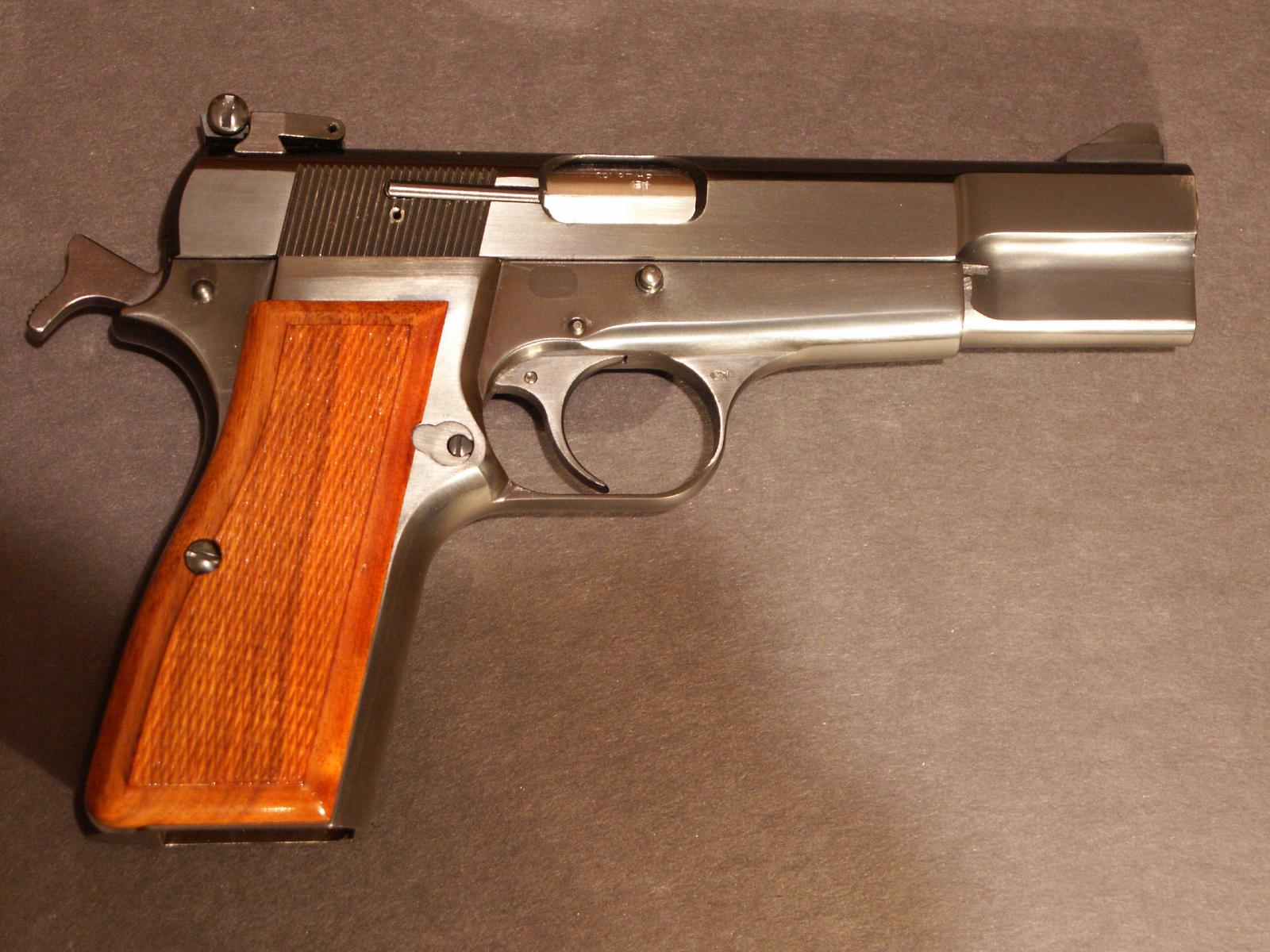
A 1971 Browning Hi-Power 10

- Argentina
- Bahrain
- Bangladesh
- Barbados
- Belize
- Bermuda
- Bolivia
- Botswana
- Brunei
- Burundi
- Cambodia
- Chad
- Chile
- Colombia
- Cuba
- Cyprus
- Democratic Republic of Congo
- Denmark - designated m/46
- Dominican Republic
- Ecuador
- El Salvador
- Estonia
- Ghana
- Guatemala
- Honduras
- Hungary: Identical copy was produced.
- Indonesia: General-issue sidearm for Indonesian Armed Forces, especially by Komando Pasukan Katak (Kopaska) naval tactical diver group and Komando Pasukan Khusus (Kopassus) army special forces group. Made under license by Pindad as the P1 from 1984, which is no longer manufactured.
- Iran: Used by Iranian Navy special forces.
- Iraq
- Jamaica: Issued to officers of the Jamaica Defence Force.
- Jordan
- Kenya
- Kuwait
- Lebanon
- Liberia
- Libya
- Lithuania
- Malawi
- Malaysia: General-issue sidearm for senior-rank officers and special forces of the military and police.
- Mozambique
- Myanmar: Known in Tatmadaw service as the MA-5 MK-I.
- Namibia: Used by Namibian Police Force (NAMPOL)
- Nepal
- Netherlands
- Nigeria: Produced under license by the Defence Industries Corporation of Nigeria
- North Korea
- Oman
- Pakistan: Used by Special Service Group Navy.
- Panama
- Papua New Guinea: Supplied by Australia.
- Paraguay
- Peru
- Philippines
- Romania
- Rwanda
- Saudi Arabia
- Sierra Leone
- South Africa: Used by the South African Special Forces Brigade
- Sri Lanka
- Sudan
- Suriname
- Syria
- Tanzania
- Thailand: Used by the Royal Thai Air Force.
- Togo
- Trinidad and Tobago
- Tunisia
- Turkey: Used by General Directorate of Security
- Uganda
- United Arab Emirates
- Venezuela
- Zimbabwe

=== Former ===
- Australia: Mark III is the general-issue pistol for the Australian Defence Force. Designated L9A1 a la British weapons. The SIG Sauer P320 began replacing the pistol in 2023.
- Austria: Used by the Austrian Armed Forces and the Gendarmerie. Used the Glock 17 by 1982.
- Belgium: Adopted by the Belgian Army in 1935. Belgian Army replaced the Hi-Power with the FN Five-seven.
- Croatia: 9,000 supplied by Argentina during the Yugoslav wars
- Finland: 2,400 Pistols imported from Belgium in 1939–1940, used during the last stages of Winter War, common usage during Continuation War, mostly issued to pilots. Retired in 1980s.
- France: Used by Gendarmerie Nationale and French Air Force during First Indochina War and Algerian war.
- Ireland: Used by the Irish Defence Forces, since replaced by the Heckler & Koch USP.
- Israel: Used by YAMAM before being replaced by Glock models. Produced locally.
- Luxembourg: Replaced by Glock 17.
- Nazi Germany: Over 300,000 pistols were made for the Wehrmacht after the FN factory was seized by Germany. Pistols were designated the Pistole 640(b).
- New Zealand: Replaced by the SIG Sauer P226, which is being replaced by the Glock 17.
- Poland Formerly used by Polish special forces (JW GROM), no longer in use.
- Portugal: Since 1935, by the gendarmerie Republican National Guard. Replaced in service.
- Rhodesia
- United Kingdom: Used in limited numbers by British airborne and commando units as well as the Special Operations Executive during the Second World War. Formally adopted by the British Army and Royal Air Force as the L9A1 in 1963, a replacement for Webley and Enfield revolvers in 1954 and by the Northern Ireland Security Guard Service in 1998.. Replaced by the Glock 17 Gen 4. Also formerly used by PT17 units in the Metropolitan Police.
  - Hong Kong: Used by the Royal Hong Kong Regiment.
- United States:
  - Used by the FBI Hostage Rescue Team as of 1999. Around 250 HPs modified by Wayne Novak to include Novak Lo-Mount three-dot night sight, Spegel grips, front straps with a matte finish, beavertail frame modifications, match barrels and a trigger job. Replaced with M1911-based pistols.
  - Standard military issue to SOG during the Vietnam War.
- Uruguay: To be replaced by Glock 17 Delays reported in 2018 on fully adopting it, although it is use with Uruguayan law enforcement.

==== Non-State Actors ====
- People's Movement for the Liberation of Azawad
- Viet Cong: Some cloned by the North Vietnamese for the VC.
- Islamic State

== Bibliography ==
- Stevens, R. Blake (1996). The Browning High Power Automatic Pistol: Expanded 1990 Edition. Coburg: Collector Grade Publications Incorporated. ISBN 0-88935-089-2.
- Thompson, Leroy (2020). The Browning High-Power Pistol. Oxford: Osprey Publishing. ISBN 978-1472838094.
- Vanderlinden, Anthony (2013). FN Browning Pistols, Side Arms that Shaped the World History: Expanded Second Edition. Greensboro: Wet Dog Publications. ISBN 0970799799.
