= Firearms policy in Azerbaijan =

According to the law, citizens of Azerbaijan who reach 18 years of age have the right to acquire smoothbore firearms and, after five years of membership in Azerbaijan Hunting Society, rifled firearms. Handguns and semi-automatic rifles are prohibited. A citizen buying a firearm may apply to the relevant executive authority with some documents such as application, medical reference about health condition and ID card. The validity period of the special permission for acquiring permitted weapons by the citizen is six months.

The citizen must register their firearms or sport arms obtained with special permission within two weeks with the relevant executive authority. A certificate confirming the right for using of firearms or sport arms is given to the owner of the registered weapon. When citizens take this certificate, they must pay a state fee determined by the relevant executive authority.

The validity period of the certificate confirming the right of the citizen for using firearms or sport arms is three years. When the validity period become invalid, the certificate is extended for the next three years based on the application and a document confirming the payment of state fee of the citizen. The application about extension of the certificate is given three months before the expiration of the period of its validity and the application is considered for 1 month from its issued by the relevant executive authority of the Azerbaijan. Arms permitted for hunting is registered one time by the relevant executive authority of the Azerbaijan. If citizens have used hunt arms without rifle no less than 5 years, then right for using of rifle hunt arms are given them.

== Rules for foreigners ==
Rules for obtaining, keeping and using of firearms in the territory of Azerbaijan by authorized persons, foreigners:

- To purchase official firearms by authorized persons of foreign states is permitted in the territory of Azerbaijan, in accordance with international treaties wherein the Azerbaijan is one of the parties and in the manner determined by the legislation of Azerbaijan.
- Authorized persons of foreign states are allowed to keep and use the service firearms belonging to them in the territory of Azerbaijan only in exceptional cases with the special permission of the Minister of Internal Affairs. If issuing of the special permit is refused, it isn't allowed to bring this service firearm to the territory of Azerbaijan and to use it on purpose in this territory. Special permission must be received before the gun is brought to Azerbaijan.
- Authorized persons of foreign states may purchase and keep civilian firearms in the territory of the Republic of Azerbaijan in accordance with the legislation of Azerbaijan.
- Foreigners must get special permission from the Ministry of Internal Affairs of Azerbaijan based on the request of the diplomatic representation of the states to which they are citizens to purchase civilian firearms in Azerbaijan.
- Foreigners may keep and use it in the territory of Azerbaijan at the latest within 5 days from the time of purchasing of it, if special permission is given to purchase of civilian firearms.

== Prohibitions ==
License for purchasing or obtaining firearms is prohibited in the following cases:

- If person has more than 7 including firearms or sport arms, except for collection items.
- If person has a medical reference of the relevant healthcare authority with regard to alcoholism, drug addiction, mental illness as well as loss of vision.
- If a person convicted for serious crimes, as well as for crimes committed by using weapons, ammunition or explosives;
- If a person has a prophylactic and operational registration in police department;
- While inability or limited acting ability is proved by validity decision of court;
- If unawareness of person about regulation for use of carrying of firearms is determined.

== See also ==
Modern equipment of the Azerbaijani Land Forces
