= Ezugwu MRAP =

Nigerian armoured vehicle

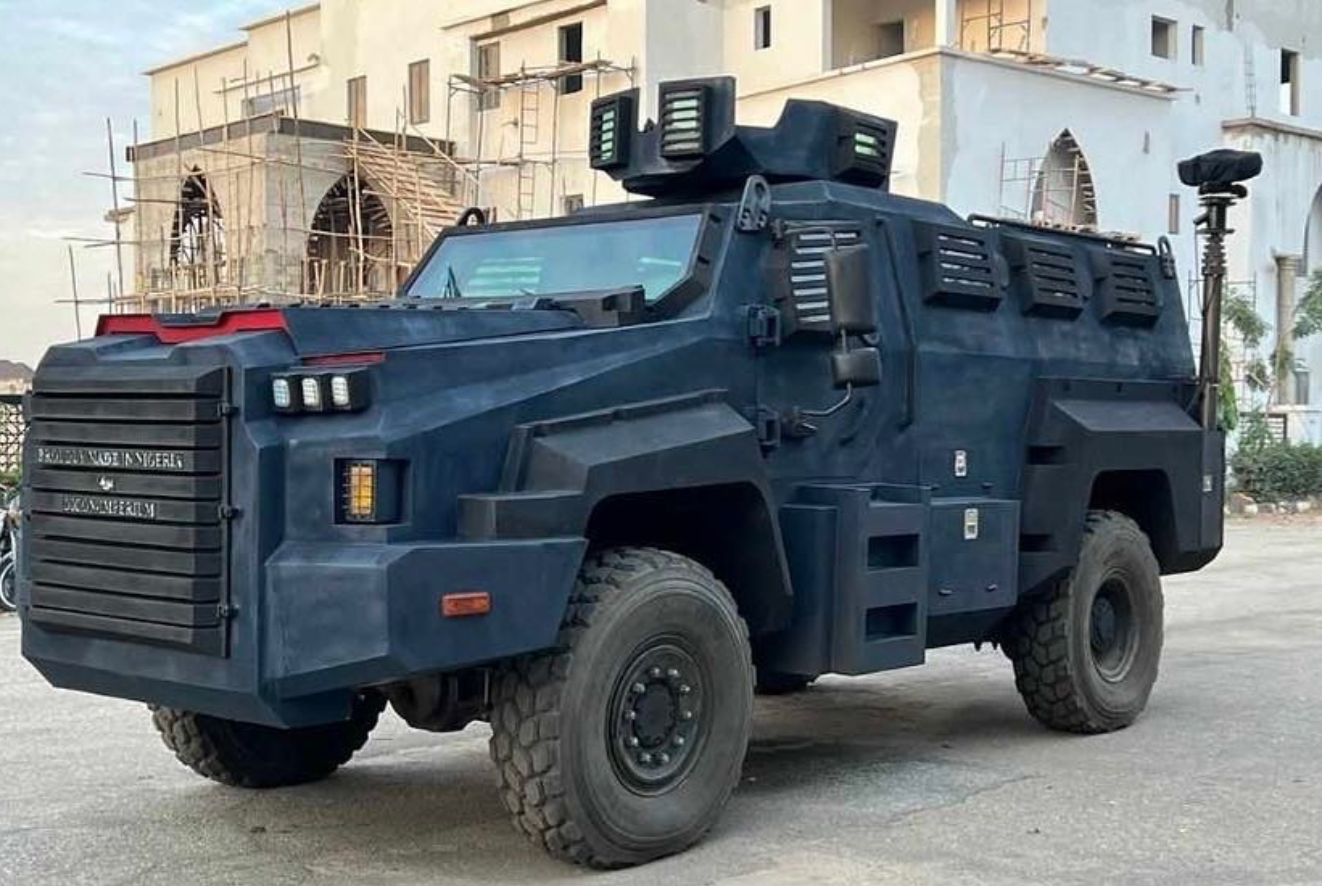
- Type: Mine-Resistant Ambush Protected Vehicle
- Place of origin: Nigeria

Service history
- In service: 2019-Present
- Used by: Nigerian Armed Forces
- Wars: Boko Haram insurgency

Production history
- Designer: Command Engineering Depot
- Manufacturer: Defence Industries Corporation of Nigeria
- Produced: 2019-Present

The Ezugwu MRAP is a Nigerian-made mine resistance and ambush protected vehicle (MRAP), designed by the Nigerian Defence Industry of Nigeria (DICON) and the Command Engineering Depot (CED).

Named after Major General Victor Ezugwu, the Ezugwu MRAP is designed to replace obsolete combat vehicles in the Nigerian Army's inventory.

== History ==
First unveiled in September 2019, earlier versions feature a double enclosed turret that can traverse 360 degrees, allowing for versatile weapon deployment, including a 12.7 mm machine gun.

The first batch of 28 Ezugwus was ordered in November 2019, and a follow up purchase of 52 units was made by the Nigerian Army in January 2021.

In 2021, DICON presented photographs of a new version of the Ezugwu. This was a 6x6 vehicle with one turret and a normal windscreen.

== Design ==
The Ezugwu MRAP is specifically engineered to withstand improvised explosive devices (IEDs) and mine blasts up to 12 kg under the vehicle. It uses a Tatra 4x4 chassis for the vehicle.

The MRAP can carry up to 12 people, consisting of a commander, driver, two gunners and eight soldiers.

It has undergone several iterations to reflect a more modern and practical MRAP design. The new design was unveiled at a Science and Technology EXPO in 2020 organized by the Federal Ministry of science and technology in Abuja.
