= Defence Industries Corporation of Nigeria =

State-run defence corporation of Nigeria

- Type: State-owned enterprise
- Industry: Defence
- Founded: 1964; 62 years ago
- Headquarters: Kaduna, Kaduna, Kaduna State, Nigeria
- Area served: Nigeria
- Products: Munitions, Small arms, Artillery, Explosives, Armored vehicles MRAPs
- Services: Manufacturing
- Owner: Nigerian Armed Forces
- Website: dicon.gov.ng

Defence Industries Corporation of Nigeria (DICON) is the state-run defence corporation of Nigeria and operated by the Nigerian Armed Forces. It is responsible for the production of defence equipment and civilian products.

== History ==
DICON was established in 1964 through an act of parliament in the Nigerian National Assembly.

From 2018 to March 2021, Major General Victor Okwudili Ezugwu was appointed as DICON's director-general.

Major General MO Uzoh was appointed DG in March 2021. He was succeeded by Major General HG Tafida in July 2021 to July 2023. Major General AE Edet took over in 11 July 2023 to 30 April 2025.

Major General Babatunde Ibrahim Alaya took over from Major General Aniedi Effiong Edet and officially assumed duty as the 25th Director General (DG) following a formal handover ceremony held on Wednesday, 30 April 2025 at the DICON House Boardroom, Kaduna.

== Products ==
It makes licensed copies of the Mills M36M (M36) handgrenade, Browning P-35 (NP-1) pistol, Beretta M12 (PMG-12) submachine gun, Beretta BM59 and FN FAL (NR1 Model 7.62) battle rifles, FN MAG (GPMG) machinegun, and RPG-7 (RPG) rocket launcher. The OBJ-006, a copy of the 7.62mm AK-47 assault rifle, is produced by DICON in 2006.

DICON has recently procured rights to manufacture a copy of the Polish FB 5.56mm Kbs wz.96 Beryl assault rifle, possibly to replace the FAL and/or AK-47 in service.

From 2012 to 2019, DICON and Marom Dolphin signed an agreement to establish a joint venture to produce ballistic vests. In 2013, DICON officials denied allegations that Nigerian-made ballistic vests from DICON factories are made under substandard conditions. After the contract expiration with Marom Dolphin, DICON Special Equipment was birthed, which is a collaboration between DICON and Imperium Industries Nig. Ltd.

The DICON Special Equipment specializes in the production of bulletproof vests, Helmets, Coveralls, Uniforms and other related items.

On October 3, 2019, DICON unveiled its first armored vehicle, known as the Ezugwu MRAP The MRAP was made in collaboration with the Nigerian Army Command Engineering Depot. It was named after Major General Victor Ezugwu, who was known for his efforts in fighting against Boko Haram, who is the director-general of DICON at the end of 2018. This was publicly shown in a ceremony by Chief of Army Staff Lt. Gen. Tukur Buratai at the Abuja International Trade Fair Complex during a Nigerian Army Day event.

During the coronavirus outbreak in 2020, DICON produced ventilators, face shields, face masks and hand sanitizer.
