= INKAS =

Group of Canadian corporations

INKAS Group of Companies
- Type: Multiple private corporations
- Industry: Security; Armored Vehicles; Manufacturing; Financial
- Founded: Toronto, Ontario, Canada (1995; 31 years ago)
- Founder: David Khazanski; Margarita Simkin
- Headquarters: Toronto, Ontario, Canada
- Key people: David Khazanski; Co-Founder, CEO; Margarita Simkin; Co-Founder, Chairperson
- Services: armored vehicles, limos, safes, manufacturing, metal fabrication, financial services, aerospace and defense
- Revenue: $150 million (2016)
- Number of employees: 360
- Website: inkas.ca

INKAS Group of Companies is a group of privately held Canadian corporations that specialize largely in the security, manufacturing, and financial industries. Many of the company’s divisions and brands operate under the registered trademark of INKAS, and include armored vehicle and safe manufacturing, metal fabrication, aerospace and defense, financial services, and environmental protection services. The company was established over 25 years ago in Toronto, Canada, where it remains headquartered today.

INKAS has worked with federal and provincial governments, and numerous authorities worldwide. Some of their clients include Haiti, Colombia, Nigeria, Azerbaijan, Canada, and the United States. INKAS also provides a number of products and services to financial institutions, corporations and individuals around the world.

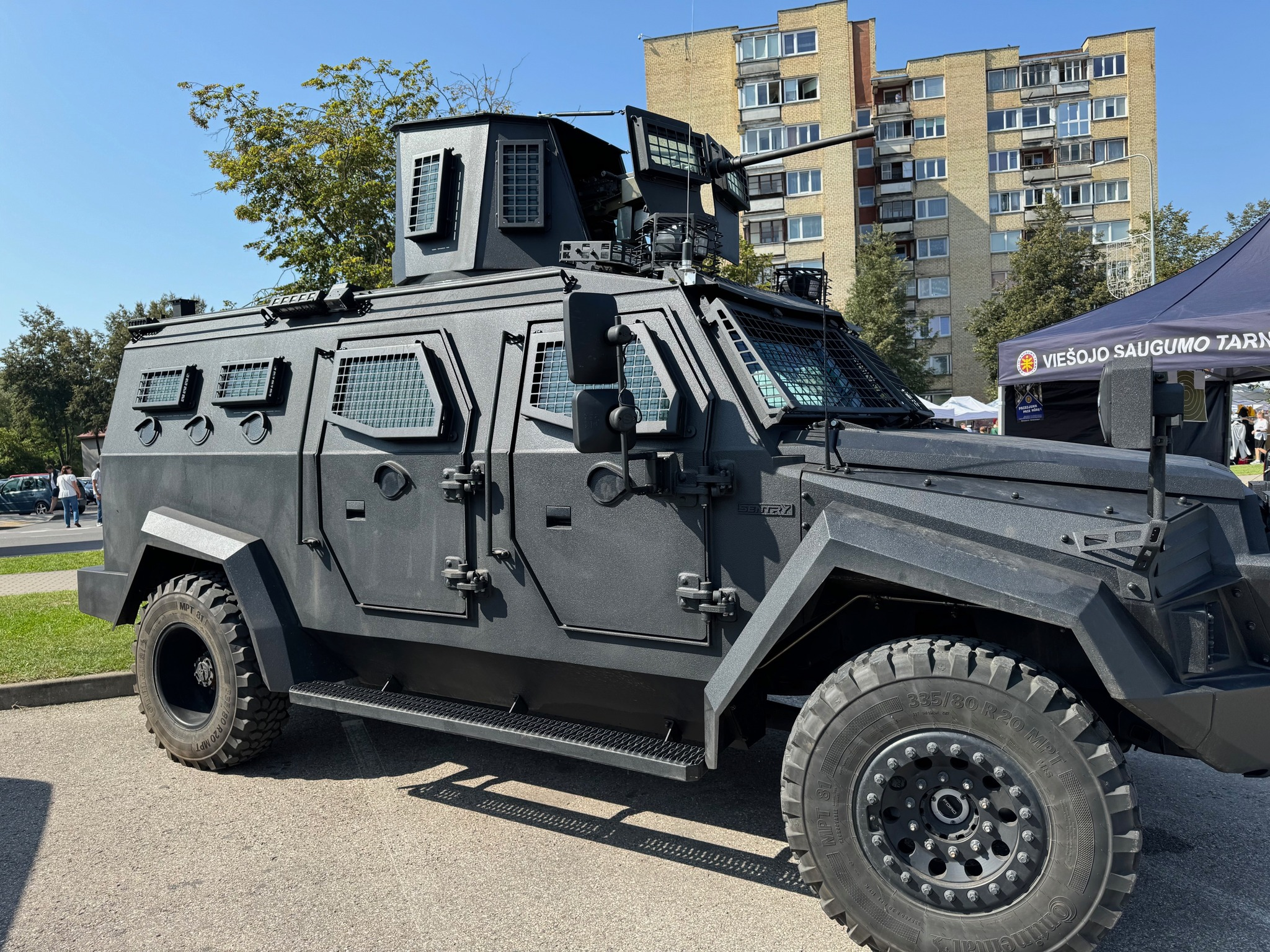
Inkas Sentry

== History ==
INKAS was founded in August 1995 in Toronto, Canada, by David Khazanski and Margarita Simkin as a single-truck armored courier service specializing in the secure transportation of cash and valuables. INKAS has established and grown various divisions and brands over the years, some of which have gone on be acquired by large players in their industries. The company’s divisions include armored vehicle manufacturing, safes manufacturing, security solutions and services, aerospace and defense, financial solutions, and environmental protection services.

In April 2014, INKAS acquired its new headquarters and manufacturing facility, and in March 2020, the company opened a second manufacturing facility in Toronto. The company also has offices, production facilities, and service centers internationally, including in Lagos, Nigeria.

== Criticism ==
In July and August 2017, CBC News reported that INKAS signed a deal with Azerbaijan’s interior ministry under which the company had delivered several Canadian-made armoured personnel carriers (APCs) to Azerbaijan. This provoked strong condemnation from the Armenian-Canadian population which was concerned that the equipment would be used in the Nagorno-Karabakh conflict or the Armenia-Azerbaijan border crisis. The Canadian government responded by promising to meet with the representatives of the Armenian community. Ramil Huseynli — Azerbaijan's Chargé d’Affaires in Ottawa — responded by saying "...the acquisition of armoured personnel carriers from a Canadian company does not pose such a threat [to regional peace and stability], as these vehicles are intended only for law enforcement and civilian transport. In this light, the hysteria of the Armenian community, who should put Canadian interests above the rest, is unintelligible.” According to the 2016 Report on Exports of Military Goods from Canada, Azerbaijan bought $378,705 worth of fire arms and ground vehicles in Canada.

In October 2023, 100 activists blocked the entrances of INKAS' Toronto offices, with five being arrested. The protestors criticized the company for helping arm the Israeli military. INKAS reports that the company “supplied the government of Israel with more command & control units than any other supplier in history”, and has also sold cyber warfare services and remotely controlled weapon stations. INKAS responded to the protest by stating that the situation caused the business to lose profits and was costly to their reputation.
