= Zigana (pistol) =

Zigana Sport
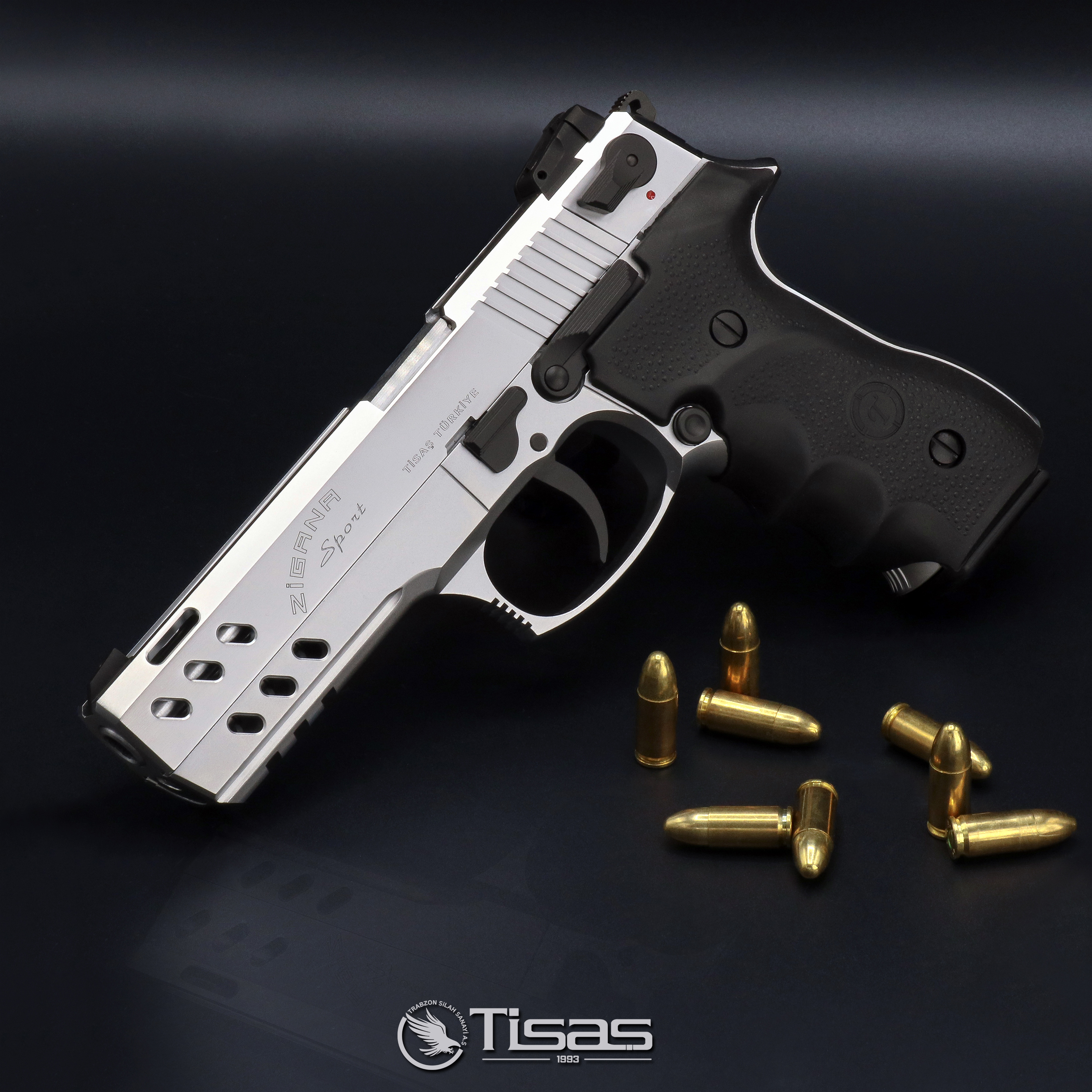
- Zigana Sport
- Type: Semi-automatic pistol
- Place of origin: Turkey

Service history
- In service: 2001–present

Production history
- Designer: TİSAŞ
- Manufacturer: TİSAŞ
- Variants: Variants

Specifications
- Width: 37 mm 33 mm (M16)
- Height: 139 mm 142 mm (M16)
- Cartridge: 9×19mm Parabellum; 9x21mm IMI.40 S&W.45 ACP
- Feed system: 15 round magazine
- Sights: Iron sights

Zigana is a semi-automatic pistol produced by Turkish firearm manufacturing company TİSAŞ. The pistol began production in 2001 from Turkey with a similar design to the Walther P88.

== Design ==
Zigana pistols have a locked-slide short recoil operating mechanism with a modified Browning-type locking system. In addition, these pistols also have an automatic firing pin block.

== Variants ==
Model	Barrel length (mm)	Length (mm)	Weight (g)	Magazine capacity
Zigana K	105	190	850	15
Zigana KC	105	190	844	15
Zigana T	130	220	918	15
Zigana F	117	205	880	15
Zigana FC	117	204	870	15
Zigana M16	126	213	810	15
Zigana 63	117	204	874	15
Zigana Sport	130	214	920	15
Zigana PX-9	102,5	180	720	18+1 Mec Gar Magazines made in Italy
Zigana P9L	114,5	191,5	770	15
Zigana P9LC	114,5	191,5	760	15

Zigana is imported by American Tactical Imports in the United States and marketed under the FS9 and FS40 names.

=== Production outside Turkey ===
The Zigana PX-9 model is produced in Malaysia in partnership with Turkey. In Pakistan, unlicensed Zigana models are produced and sold by local workshops.

In addition, the Zigana K and Zigana F models are licensed under te name of Zəfər, Zəfər-K and Inam by the Ministry of Defense Industry of the Republic of Azerbaijan.

== Users ==
- Azerbaijan: Zəfər, Zəfər-K, Zəfər-P and Inam variants in use by Azerbaijani Armed Forces and Police Units.
- Turkey: Used by a limited number of military units and private security companies.
- Philippines: The Zigana PX-9 model is used by the Philippine police forces.
- Malaysia: Annually, 20,000 Zigana PX-9 model pistols are produced mostly for the use of Malaysian military personnel and police.
- Pakistan: Zigana-K, Zigana-P, and Inam variants are used by gangsters in Pakistan and street criminals.
