= TİSAŞ =

Turkish firearms manufacturing company

TİSAŞ (Trabzon Silah Sanayi AŞ)
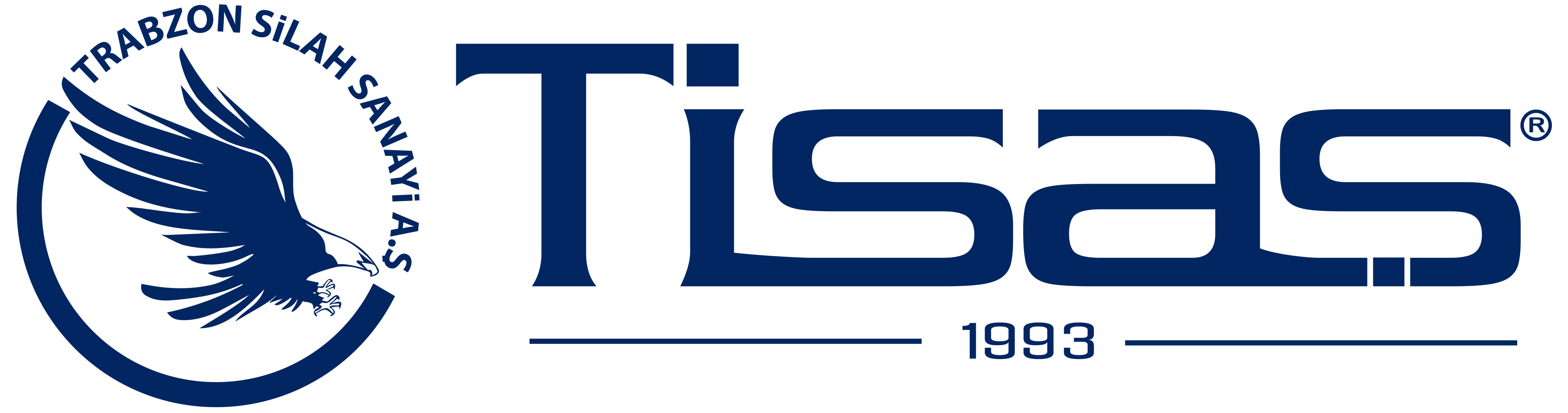
- Company type: Private
- Industry: Firearms
- Founded: 1993; 33 years ago
- Headquarters: Trabzon, Turkey
- Area served: Worldwide
- Products: Pistols, rifles
- Website: Official website

TİSAŞ (Trabzon Silah Sanayi AŞ) is a Turkish firearms manufacturing company, mainly focused on manufacturing pistols. Its firearms are used worldwide by civilians, police and military.

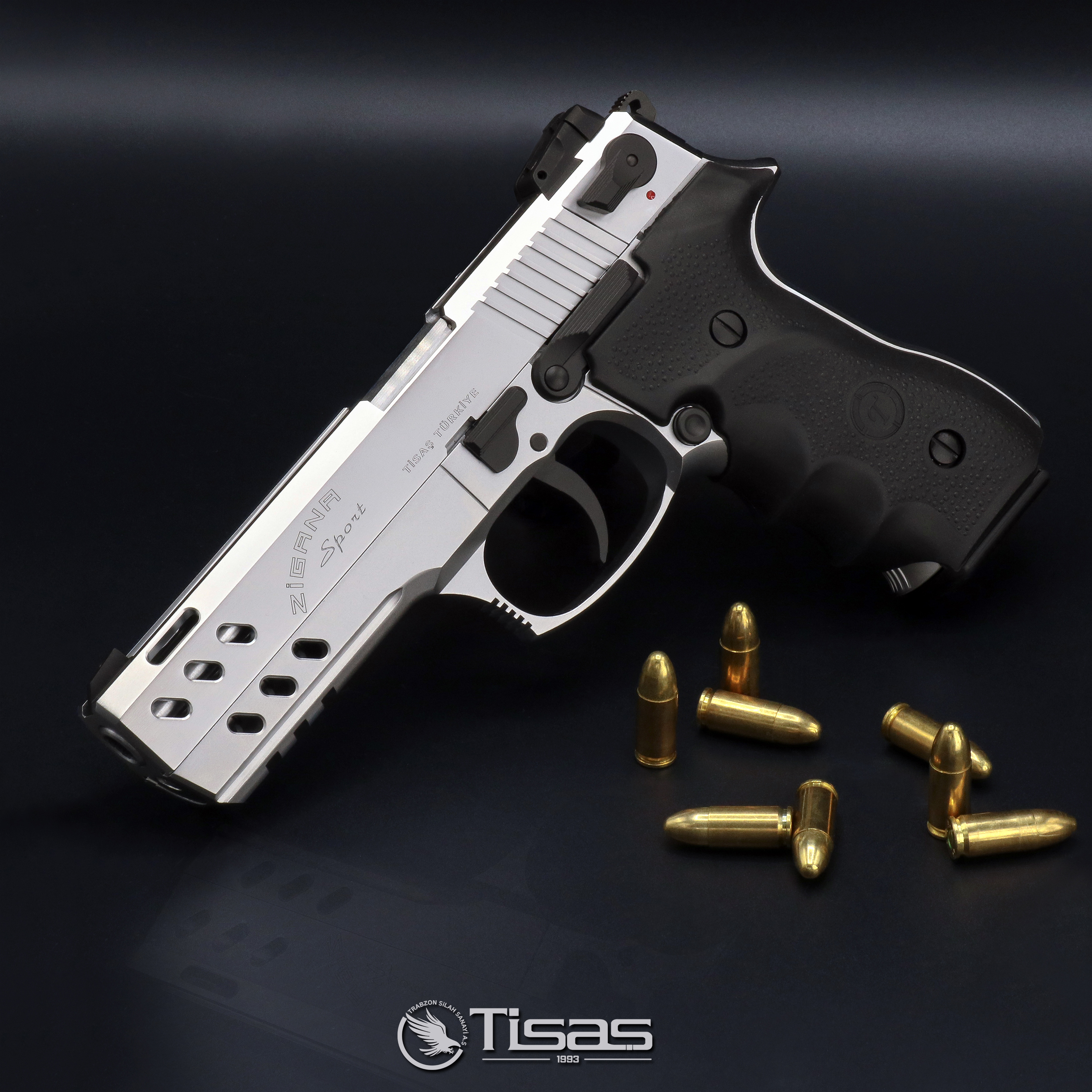
Zigana Sport

== History ==
TISAS was established in Trabzon in 1993. TİSAŞ is a KOSGEB (Small and Medium Industry Development Organization) and M.K.E (Mechanical and Chemical Industry Corporation) coordinated company. TİSAŞ foundation is settled on an open area of 11,000 m² in Arsin Trabzon Organized Industry Zone and total covered area of the facilities is 5,500 m². TİSAŞ founded its Ankara District Office in 1998 to meet increasing demand and to execute foreign trade operations.

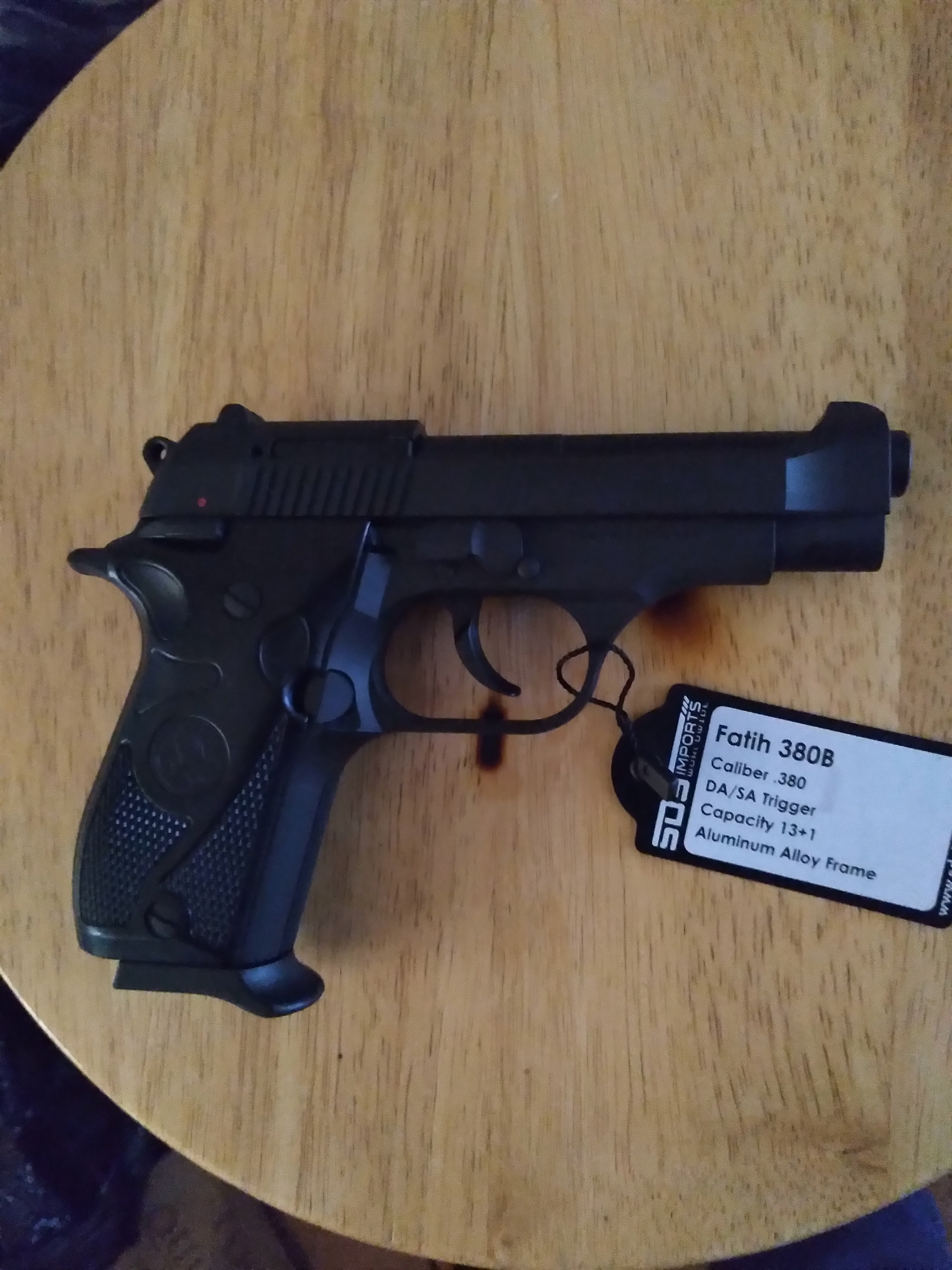
Tisas Fatih 13 380 ACP pistol.

TİSAŞ began to produce its first pistol, the 7.65 mm Fatih 13, in 1994. In 1998, TİSAŞ decided to manufacture 9×19 mm pistols as well, with a view to meet market demand. Joint studies were carried out within the scope of the Eastern Black Sea Weapon Project by the R & D Department at TİSAŞ and the Black Sea Technical University KOSGEB Technology Development Department. As a result, TİSAŞ began to produce 9×19 mm KANUNİ 16 pistols with a capacity of 15 as of 1999. In 2000, TİSAŞ began to manufacture the KANUNİ S and ZİGANA M16 series of Turkish-patented pistols. In 2003, ZİGANA K and ZİGANA T models have been added to the TİSAŞ pistol models. In 2004, USA Firearms Technology Branch examined the models ZİGANA M16, ZİGANA K, ZİGANA T and found each one to have the characteristics in conformity with the ATF Form 4590, "Factoring Criteria for Weapons". At the end of the year 2005, a new model ZİGANA SPORT was offered for sale. In 2006, TİSAŞ has completed the R&D and the tests for the first .45 caliber gun of Turkey, ZİGANA C45 and introduce to the market at the beginning of 2007. Within the same year, 9×19 mm ZİGANA F and new version FATİH 13 .380 ACP models were offered to sale.

== Products ==
=== Pistols ===
==== ZIG M1911 1911 clones ====
ZIG M1911 A1

ZIG M1911 MATCH

ZIG M1911 GOLD

ZIG M1911 SILVER

ZIG M1911 Night Stalker

ZIG M45 BANTAM

ZIG M1

1911 D10

==== ZIGANA ====
ZIGANA SPORT

ZIGANA T

ZIGANA F

ZIGANA K

ZIGANA KC

==== PX-9 ====
PX-9 GEN3 IO

PX-GEN3 DUTY

PX-9 GEN3 DUTY TH

PX-9 GEN3 TACTICAL

PX-9 GEN3 Night Stalker SF

==== TİSAŞ PX-5.7 ====
PX-5.7

==== ZİG 14 Browning Hi-Power clone ====
ZİG14 SPORT

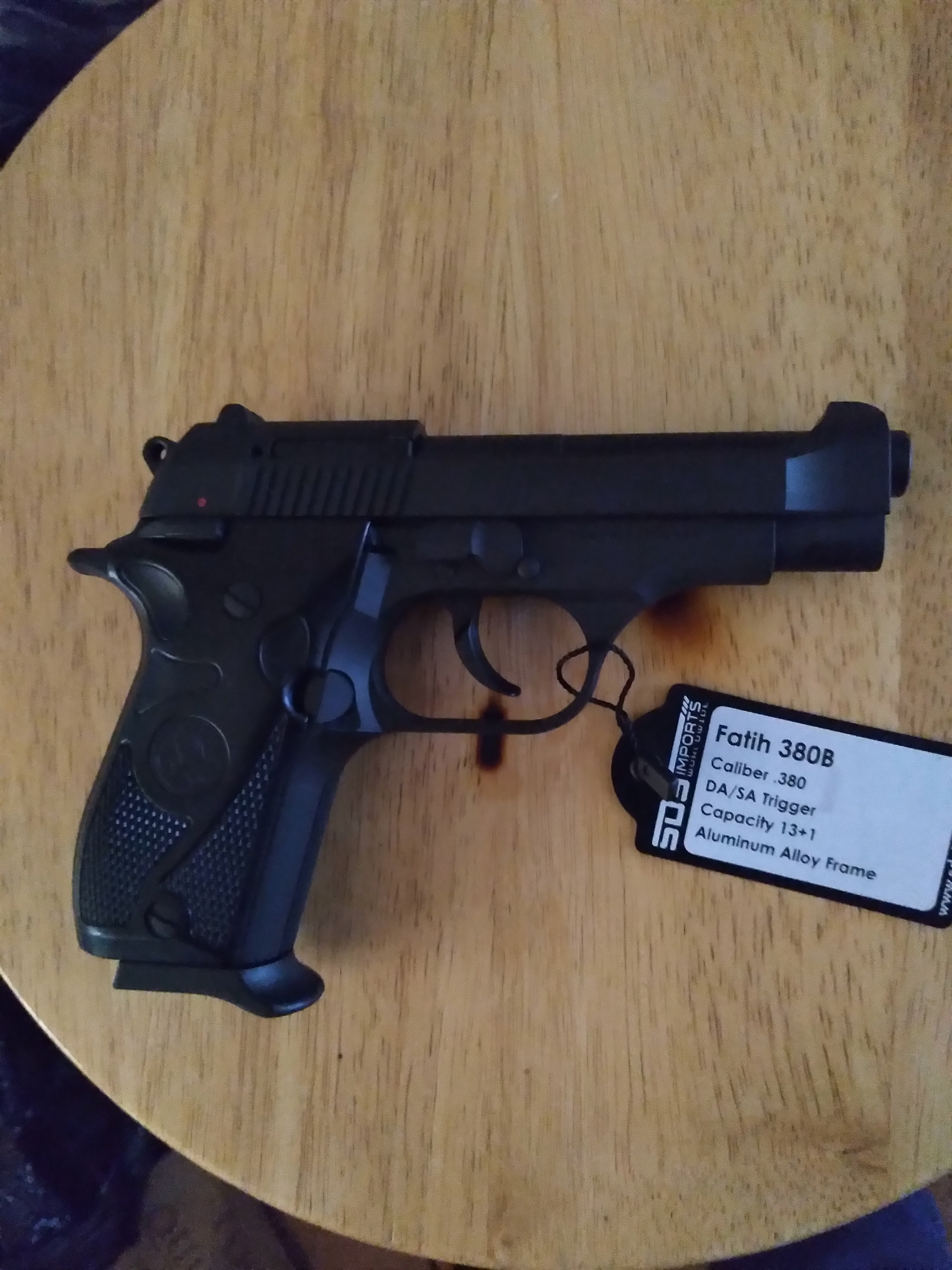
Tisas Fatih 13

=== Infantry rifles ===
- ZPT 5.56×45mm NATO and 7.62×51mm NATO variants - AR-15 clones
  - ZPT 556
  - ZPT 556K
  - ZPT 556L
  - ZPT 762
